= Wisconsin's Kenosha County 2nd Assembly district =

Former American legislative district

Wisconsin's Kenosha County 2nd State Assembly district
- Obsolete
- Notes: 1848–1862; 1922–1972

Wisconsin's Kenosha County 2nd Assembly district was a district in the Wisconsin State Assembly for much of the history of the state of Wisconsin, up to the legislative redistricting reforms of 1972 which created the current numbered districts. Located in southeast Wisconsin, the district was always comprised the western half of Kenosha County, Wisconsin, but at times spread as far east as the outlying wards of the city of Kenosha. The district was one of the 66 original Assembly districts defined in Article XIV of the Constitution of Wisconsin, though it was originally known as the Racine County 5th Assembly district prior to the creation of Kenosha County in 1850.

The district was in use for elections from 1848 through 1861, then again for elections from 1922 until 1972.

== List of representatives ==
List of representatives from the Kenosha County 2nd district
Member	Party	Residence	Term start	Term end	Leg.
District created
Elias Woodworth Jr.	Dem.	Bristol	June 5, 1848	January 1, 1849	1st
Hermon Thorp	F.S.	Bristol	January 1, 1849	January 7, 1850	2nd
George M. Robinson	F.S.	Salem	January 7, 1850	January 6, 1851	3rd
Obed Hale	F.S.	Paris	January 6, 1851	January 5, 1852	4th
Lathrop Burgess	F.S.	Salem	January 5, 1852	January 3, 1853	5th
James C. McKisson	Dem.	Wheatland	January 3, 1853	January 2, 1854	6th
Jesse Hooker	Whig	Salem	January 2, 1854	January 1, 1855	7th
Philander Judson	Rep.	Bristol	January 1, 1855	January 7, 1856	8th
Franklin Newell	Rep.	Paris	January 7, 1856	January 5, 1857	9th
Lathrop Burgess	Rep.	Salem	January 5, 1857	January 4, 1858	10th
Almon Cornwell	Rep.	Salem	January 4, 1858	January 3, 1859	11th
James C. McKisson	Rep.	Wheatland	January 3, 1859	January 2, 1860	12th
Salmon Upson	Rep.	Bristol	January 2, 1860	January 7, 1861	13th
Marcus Linsley	Rep.	Paris	January 7, 1861	January 6, 1862	14th
District abolished by 1861 Wisconsin Act 216; Kenosha County was consolidated as a single-county Assembly district
District re-established by 1921 Wisconsin Act 470
Don J. Vincent	Rep.	Genoa City	January 1, 1923	January 7, 1929	56th 57th 58th
August J. Piper	Rep.	Somers	January 7, 1929	January 2, 1933	59th 60th
George E. Mahoney	Dem.	Pleasant Prairie	January 2, 1933	January 7, 1935	61st
Matt G. Siebert	Dem.	Salem	January 7, 1935	January 4, 1937	62nd
Emil Costello	Prog.	Kenosha	January 4, 1937	January 2, 1939	63rd
Matt G. Siebert	Dem.	Salem	January 2, 1939	January 6, 1947	64th 65th 66th 67th
George Molinaro	Dem.	Kenosha	January 6, 1947	January 3, 1955	68th 69th 70th 71st
Joseph Lourigan	Dem.	Kenosha	January 3, 1955	January 7, 1957	72nd
Earl D. Morton	Rep.	Kenosha	January 7, 1957	January 2, 1961	73rd 74th
Russell Olson	Rep.	Randall	January 2, 1961	January 4, 1965	75th 76th
Earl H. Elfers	Dem.	Salem	January 4, 1965	January 2, 1967	77th
Russell Olson	Rep.	Randall	January 2, 1967	January 4, 1971	78th 79th
Eugene Dorff	Dem.	Kenosha	January 4, 1971	January 1, 1973	80th
District abolished by 1971 Wisconsin Act 304; Kenosha County was divided between the 64th, 65th, and 66th Assembly districts The Kenosha County 2nd district was split between the 65th and 66th Assembly districts
