= 14th Wisconsin Legislature =

Wisconsin legislative term for 1861

←	13th	15th	→

Overview
- Legislative body: Wisconsin Legislature
- Meeting place: Wisconsin State Capitol
- Term: January 7, 1861 – January 6, 1862
- Election: November 6, 1860

Senate
- Members: 30
- Senate President: Butler G. Noble (R)
- President pro tempore: Alden I. Bennett (R)
- Party control: Republican

Assembly
- Members: 97
- Assembly Speaker: Amasa Cobb (R)
- Party control: Republican

Sessions
- 1st: January 9, 1861 – April 17, 1861
- Special: May 15, 1861 – May 27, 1861

The Fourteenth Wisconsin Legislature convened from January 9, 1861, to April 17, 1861, in regular session. The legislature re-convened in special session from May 15, 1861, to May 27, 1861, at the request of Wisconsin Governor Alexander Randall, to approve funding for a brigade of volunteers for the American Civil War.

Senators representing odd-numbered districts were newly elected for this session and were serving the first year of a two-year term. Assembly members were elected to a one-year term. Assembly members and even-numbered senators were elected in the general election of November 6, 1860. Senators representing even-numbered districts were serving the second year of their two-year term, having been elected in the general election held on November 8, 1859.

The governor of Wisconsin during this entire term was Republican Alexander Randall, of Waukesha County, serving the second year of his second two-year term, having won re-election in the 1859 Wisconsin gubernatorial election.

== Major events ==
- January 23, 1861: Timothy O. Howe elected United States Senator by the Wisconsin Legislature in Joint Session.
- March 4, 1861: Inauguration of Abraham Lincoln as the 16th President of the United States.
- April 12, 1861: South Carolina militia began bombarding Fort Sumpter in Charleston Harbor.
- April 15, 1861: U.S. President Abraham Lincoln issued a proclamation requesting the states provide 75,000 volunteers for service in the American Civil War.
- April 16, 1861: 1st Wisconsin Volunteer Infantry Regiment raised in Milwaukee.
- May 9, 1861: Wisconsin Governor Alexander Randall called for a special session of the Wisconsin Legislature.
- July 21, 1861: First Battle of Bull Run took place in Prince William County, Virginia, one regiment of Wisconsin volunteers participated in the battle.
- November 8, 1861: Louis P. Harvey elected Governor of Wisconsin.

== Major legislation ==
=== First session ===
- January 21, 1861: Joint Resolution, co-operating with friends of the Union throughout the United States, 1861 Joint Resolution 1
- April 11, 1861: Act to apportion the State into Senate and Assembly Districts. 1861 Act 216
- April 13, 1861: Act to provide for apportioning the State into Congressional Districts, 1861 Act 238
- April 13, 1861: Act to provide for the defence of the State, and to aid in enforcing the laws and maintaining the authority of the Federal Government, 1861 Act 239
- April 17, 1861: Act to declare the rights and privileges of such persons as may enroll themselves into the service of the country. 1861 Act 309

=== Special session ===
- May 21, 1861: Joint Resolution, authorizing the Governor to be absent from the State during the present war, 1861 Special Session Joint Resolution 1
- May 25, 1861: Joint Resolution, recommending to the War Department the formation of a brigade, and the appointment of Hon. Rufus King to its command, 1861 Special Session Joint Resolution 2
- May 25, 1861: Joint Resolution, in regard to the assassination of Col. Ellsworth, 1861 Special Session Joint Resolution 3
- May 25, 1861: Act to provide for the assistance of volunteers in the service of the United States Government, 1861 Special Session Act 2
- May 25, 1861: Act to provide a military force for immediate service to aid in protecting and defending the Constitution and the Union, 1861 Special Session Act 4
- May 25, 1861: Act to prevent rendering aid to Rebels, 1861 Special Session Act 5
- May 25, 1861: Act to provide for the purchasing of Arms and Equipments for the use of the State, 1861 Special Session Act 6
- May 27, 1861: Act to provide for the payment of discharged Volunteers, 1861 Special Session Act 9
- May 27, 1861: Act to provide for borrowing money to repel invasion, suppress insurrection, and defend the State in time of war, 1861 Special Session Act 13

== Party summary ==
=== Senate summary ===
Senate partisan composition Democratic: 8 seats Republican: 22 seats

	Party (Shading indicates majority caucus)			Total	
	Democratic	Union	Republican	Total	Vacant
End of previous Legislature	11	0	19	30	0
1st Session	8	0	22	30	0
Final voting share	27%	0%	73%		
Beginning of the next Legislature	11	2	20	33	0

=== Assembly summary ===
Assembly partisan composition Democratic: 26 seats Republican: 71 seats

	Party (Shading indicates majority caucus)				Total	
	Democratic	Ind.	Union	Republican	Total	Vacant
End of previous Legislature	38	1	0	58	97	0
Start of 1st Session	27	0	0	70	97	0
after January 25	26	0	0	71	97	0
Final voting share	27%	0%	0%	73%		
Beginning of the next Legislature	43	0	11	45	99	1

== Sessions ==
- 1st Regular session: January 9, 1861 – April 17, 1861
- Special session: May 15, 1861 – May 27, 1861

== Leaders ==
=== Senate leadership ===
- President of the Senate: Butler G. Noble, Lieutenant Governor
- President pro tempore: Alden I. Bennett

=== Assembly leadership ===
- Speaker of the Assembly: Amasa Cobb

== Members ==
=== Members of the Senate ===
Members of the Wisconsin Senate for the Fourteenth Wisconsin Legislature:

Senate partisan representation Democratic: 8 seats Republican: 22 seats

District	Counties	Senator	Party	Residence
01	Sheboygan	Luther H. Cary	Rep.	Greenbush
02	Brown, Door, Kewaunee, Oconto, Outagamie, Shawanaw	Edward Decker	Dem.	Kewaunee
03	Ozaukee	Hugh Cunning	Dem.	Ozaukee
04	Washington	Densmore W. Maxon	Dem.	Cedar Creek
05	Milwaukee (Northern Half)	Charles Quentin	Dem.	Milwaukee
06	Milwaukee (Southern Half)	Michael J. Egan	Dem.	Milwaukee
07	Racine	William L. Utley	Rep.	Racine
08	Kenosha	George Bennett	Rep.	Kenosha
09	Adams, Juneau, Sauk	John T. Kingston	Rep.	Necedah
10	Waukesha	Denison Worthington	Rep.	Summit
11	Dane (Eastern Part)	Samuel C. Bean	Rep.	Sun Prairie
12	Walworth	Oscar F. Bartlett	Rep.	East Troy
13	Lafayette	Samuel Cole	Dem.	Gratiot
14	Jefferson (Northern Part) & Dodge (Southern Part)	Charles R. Gill	Rep.	Watertown
15	Iowa & Richland	Lemuel W. Joiner	Rep.	Wyoming
16	Grant	Noah H. Virgin	Rep.	Platteville
17	Rock (Western Part)	Ezra A. Foot	Rep.	Footville
18	Rock (Eastern Part)	Alden I. Bennett	Rep.	Beloit
19	Manitowoc & Calumet	Benjamin J. Sweet	Rep.	Chilton
20	Fond du Lac	Elihu Phillips	Rep.	Fond du Lac
21	Winnebago	Horace O. Crane (resigned Jun. 1861)	Rep.	Neenah
22	Dodge	Benjamin Ferguson	Dem.	Fox Lake
23	Jefferson (Southern Part)	Edwin Montgomery	Rep.	Farmington
24	Green	John W. Stewart	Rep.	Monroe
25	Columbia	Gerry W. Hazelton	Rep.	Columbus
26	Dane (Western Part)	John B. Sweat	Dem.	Black Earth
27	Marathon, Portage, Waupaca, Waushara, Wood	Edward L. Browne	Rep.	Waupaca
28	Burnett, Chippewa, Clark, Douglas, Dunn, La Pointe, Pierce, Polk, St. Croix	Charles B. Cox	Rep.	River Falls
29	Marquette	Charles S. Kelsey	Rep.	Montello
30	Bad Ax, Buffalo, Crawford, Jackson, La Crosse, Monroe, Tremealeau	Buel E. Hutchinson	Rep.	Prairie du Chien

=== Members of the Assembly ===
Members of the Assembly for the Fourteenth Wisconsin Legislature:

Assembly partisan representation Democratic: 26 seats Republican: 71 seats

Senate District	County	District	Representative	Party	Residence
09	Adams, Juneau		Otis B. Lapham	Rep.	Friendship
28	Ashland, Burnett, Douglas, La Pointe, Polk, St. Croix		John Comstock	Rep.	Hudson
30	Bad Ax, Crawford		Daniel H. Johnson	Rep.	Prairie du Chien
02	Brown		Frederick S. Ellis	Dem.	Green Bay
30	Buffalo, Jackson, Trempealeau		Calvin R. Johnson	Rep.	Black River Falls
19	Calumet		Le Roy Graves	Rep.	Gravesville
28	Chippewa, Clark, Dunn, Pierce		Rodman Palmer	Rep.	Chippewa Falls
25	Columbia	1	Harvey W. Emery	Rep.	Portage
25	Columbia	2	Nathan Hazen	Rep.	Poynette
25	Columbia	3	James H. Bonney	Rep.	Belle Fountain
11	Dane	1	Sereno W. Graves	Rep.	Rutland
11	Dane	2	Willard H. Chandler	Rep.	Windsor
11	Dane	3	Edward W. Dwight	Rep.	Oregon
26	Dane	4	Frederick A. Pfaff	Dem.	Cross Plains
26	Dane	5	Dominick O'Malley	Dem.	Westport
26	Dane	6	David Atwood	Rep.	Madison
22	Dodge	1	Peter Peters	Dem.	Rubicon
22	Dodge	2	Jacob Bodden	Dem.	Theresa
22	Dodge	3	David N. Minor	Rep.	Rubicon
22	Dodge	4	George W. Bly	Rep.	Waupun
22	Dodge	5	Frederick H. Kribs	Rep.	Beaver Dam
22	Dodge	6	John J. Williams	Rep.	Lowell
02	Door, Kewaunee, Oconto, Shawano		William S. Finley	Rep.	Kewaunee
20	Fond du Lac	1	Charles F. Hammond	Rep.	Ripon
20	Fond du Lac	2	Benjamin H. Bettis	Rep.	Ladoga
20	Fond du Lac	3	Selim Newton	Rep.	Fond du Lac
20	Fond du Lac	4	John W. Hall	Dem.	Dotyville
20	Fond du Lac	5	Horace Stanton	Dem.	Fond du Lac
16	Grant	1	Joseph Harris	Rep.	Hazel Green
16	Grant	2	Henry L. Massey	Rep.	Potosi
16	Grant	3	Hanmer Robbins	Rep.	Platteville
16	Grant	4	John G. Clark	Rep.	Lancaster
16	Grant	5	Jared Warner	Rep.	Patch Grove
24	Green	1	James Campbell	Rep.	Albany
24	Green	2	Obadiah J. White	Rep.	Monroe
29	Green Lake		Alvin L. Flint	Rep.	Princeton
15	Iowa	1	Franklin Z. Hicks	Rep.	Avoca
15	Iowa	2	Amasa Cobb	Rep.	Mineral Point
23	Jefferson	1	Jost D. Petrie	Rep.	Concord
23	Jefferson	2	Horace B. Willard	Rep.	Lake Mills
14	Jefferson	3	Theodore Prentiss	Dem.	Watertown
14	Jefferson	4	Samuel Hays	Dem.	Neosho
14	Jefferson	5	Sterling M. Cone	Dem.	Waterloo
08	Kenosha	1	Michael Frank	Rep.	Kenosha
08	Kenosha	2	Marcus Linsley	Rep.	Paris
30	La Crosse & Monroe		Isaac E. Messmore	Rep.	La Crosse
13	Lafayette	1	Thomas C. L. Mackay	Dem.	Elk Grove
13	Lafayette	2	Lloyd T. Pullen	Rep.	Argyle
13	Lafayette	3	Elijah C. Townsend	Dem.	Shullsburg
19	Manitowoc	1	Jabez L. Fobes	Rep.	Two Rivers
19	Manitowoc	2	Joseph Stephenson	Rep.	Meeme
27	Marathon, Portage, Wood		Orestes Garrison	Rep.	Centralia
29	Marquette		Erastus J. Buck	Rep.	Westfield
05	Milwaukee	1	Robert Haney	Dem.	Milwaukee
05	Milwaukee	2	George Abert	Dem.	Milwaukee
06	Milwaukee	3	Edward Keogh	Dem.	Milwaukee
06	Milwaukee	4	Charles Caverno	Rep.	Milwaukee
06	Milwaukee	5	John Rugee	Rep.	Milwaukee
05	Milwaukee	6	Carl Winkler	Dem.	Milwaukee
05	Milwaukee	7	William Dieves	Dem.	Greenfield
06	Milwaukee	8	John Hanrahan	Dem.	Good Hope
06	Milwaukee	9	James Riordan	Dem.	Franklin
02	Outagamie		Almeron B. Everts	Dem.	Appleton
03	Ozaukee	1	William H. Ramsey	Dem.	Ozaukee
03	Ozaukee	2	William F. Opitz	Dem.	Mequon
07	Racine	1	Gilbert Knapp	Rep.	Racine
07	Racine	2	Orlando C. Munroe	Rep.	Racine
07	Racine	3	Simeon S. Bradford	Rep.	Union Grove
07	Racine	4	Samuel E. Chapman	Rep.	Waterford
15	Richland		Elihu Bailey	Rep.	Mill Creek
18	Rock	1	Stiles S. Northrop	Rep.	Ogden
18	Rock	2	Benjamin F. Cary	Rep.	Johnstown
17	Rock	3	Alexander Graham	Rep.	Janesville
17	Rock	4	Anson W. Pope	Rep.	Janesville
17	Rock	5	James Kirkpatrick	Rep.	Brodhead
09	Sauk	1	John Bear	Rep.	Plain
09	Sauk	2	Marsena Temple	Rep.	Newport
01	Sheboygan	1	John Gee	Dem.	Sheboygan
01	Sheboygan	2	John Bredemeyer	Rep.	Edwards
01	Sheboygan	3	Cadwaller W. Humphrey (until Jan. 25)	Dem.	Cascade
01	Sheboygan	3	William F. Mitchell (from Jan. 25)	Rep.	Gibbsville
12	Walworth	1	Schuyler W. Benson	Rep.	Bloomfield
12	Walworth	2	Chester D. Long	Rep.	Darien
12	Walworth	3	Francis Smith	Rep.	Millard
12	Walworth	4	Wyman Spooner	Rep.	Elkhorn
04	Washington	1	Nathan Parker	Rep.	Hartford
04	Washington	2	Leander F. Frisby	Rep.	West Bend
04	Washington	3	Valentine Schaetzel	Dem.	Menomonee Falls
10	Waukesha	1	Daniel Cottrell	Rep.	Oconomowoc
10	Waukesha	2	William H. Thomas	Dem.	Lisbon
10	Waukesha	3	Henry A. Youmans	Rep.	Mukwonago
10	Waukesha	4	Myron Gilbert	Rep.	Prospect Hill
10	Waukesha	5	Isaac Lain	Rep.	Waukesha
27	Waupaca		Chester D. Combs	Rep.	North Royalton
27	Waushara		Henry G. Webb	Rep.	Wautoma
21	Winnebago	1	Philetus Sawyer	Rep.	Oshkosh
21	Winnebago	2	Curtis Reed	Dem.	Menasha
21	Winnebago	3	Armine Pickett	Rep.	Weelaunee

== Employees ==
=== Senate employees ===
- Chief Clerk: John H. Warren
  - Assistant Clerk: Stephen Steele Barlow
  - Engrossing Clerk: Willard Merrill
  - Enrolling Clerk: Edward Colman
  - Transcribing Clerk: F. H. Megdeburg
- Sergeant-at-Arms: J. A. Hadley
  - Assistant Sergeant-at-Arms: David M. McBride
- Postmaster: James Moore
  - Assistant Postmaster: A. B. Finch
- Doorkeeper: Phillip Carey
  - Assistant Doorkeeper: Henry Case
- Fireman: George Wittle
- Messengers:
  - Walter C. Wyman
  - Albert F. Dexter
  - Patrick Lanner

=== Assembly employees ===
- Chief Clerk: L. H. D. Crane
  - Assistant Clerk: John S. Dean
    - Bookkeeper: Ephraim W. Young
  - Engrossing Clerk: Joseph C. Pickard
  - Enrolling Clerk: Nathaniel F. Lund
  - Transcribing Clerk: Harvey Briggs
- Sergeant-at-Arms: Craig B. Beese
  - Assistant Sergeant-at-Arms: Asher Armstrong
  - Assistant Sergeant-at-Arms: Ebenezer Sprague
- Postmaster: Hiram Beckworth
  - Assistant Postmaster: John N. Stone
- Doorkeeper: Joel Barber
  - Assistant Doorkeeper: Joshua W. Tolford
- Firemen:
  - William C. Lasure
  - Reese Evans
  - Henry N. Solbert
- Messengers:
  - William H. Barnes
  - William Benedict
  - William Bennett
  - H. M. Bingham
  - Charles L. Catlin
  - Edwin C. Mason
  - William E. Miller
  - James H. Neavill
  - George D. Potter
  - William H. Smith
