= 11th Wisconsin Legislature =

Wisconsin legislative term for 1858

←	10th	12th	→
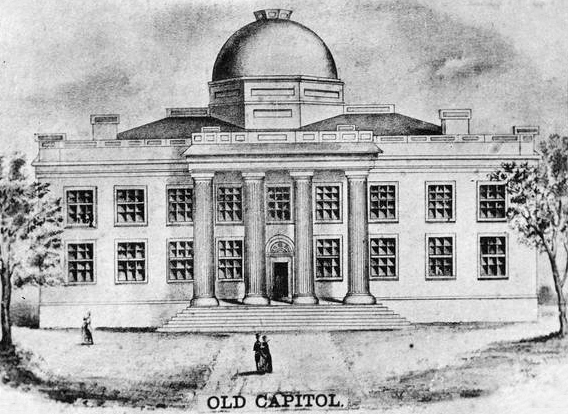
- Wisconsin State Capitol, 1855

Overview
- Legislative body: Wisconsin Legislature
- Meeting place: Wisconsin State Capitol
- Term: January 4, 1858 – January 3, 1859
- Election: November 3, 1857

Senate
- Members: 30
- Senate President: Erasmus D. Campbell (D)
- President pro tempore: Hiram H. Giles (R)
- Party control: Republican

Assembly
- Members: 97
- Assembly Speaker: Frederick S. Lovell (R)
- Party control: Republican

Sessions
- 1st: January 13, 1858 – March 17, 1858

The Eleventh Wisconsin Legislature convened from January 13, 1858, to March 17, 1858, in regular session.

Senators representing even-numbered districts were newly elected for this session and were serving the first year of a two-year term. Assembly members were elected to a one-year term. Assembly members and even-numbered senators were elected in the general election of November 3, 1857. Senators representing odd-numbered districts were serving the second year of their two-year term, having been elected in the general election held on November 4, 1856.

The governor of Wisconsin during this entire term was Republican Alexander Randall, of Waukesha County, serving the first year of a two-year term, having won election in the 1857 Wisconsin gubernatorial election.

== Major events ==
- January 4, 1858: Inauguration of Alexander Randall as the 6th Governor of Wisconsin.

== Major legislation ==
- February 25, 1858: Act to divide the County of Dunn, and create the County of Pepin, 1858 Act 15
- March 5, 1858: Act to divide the County of Marquette and erect the County of Green Lake, 1858 Act 17
- May 12, 1858: Act providing for the organization, enrolling and discipline of the Militia of the State of Wisconsin, 1858 Act 87
- May 17, 1858: Act to protect the people against corrupt and secret influences of matters of Legislation, 1858 Act 145

== Party summary ==
=== Senate summary ===
Senate partisan composition Democratic: 12 seats Republican: 18 seats

	Party (Shading indicates majority caucus)			Total	
	Democratic	Ind.	Republican	Total	Vacant
End of previous Legislature	11	0	19	30	0
1st Session	12	0	18	30	0
Final voting share	40%	0%	60%		
Beginning of the next Legislature	14	0	16	30	0

=== Assembly summary ===
Assembly partisan composition Democratic: 44 seats Republican: 53 seats

	Party (Shading indicates majority caucus)			Total	
	Democratic	Ind.	Republican	Total	Vacant
End of previous Legislature	34	0	63	97	0
Start of session	44	0	53	97	0
From Aug. 13 (Note: Democrat Paul Juneau (Dodge County) died.)	43	0	53	96	1
Final voting share	45%	0%	55%		
Beginning of the next Legislature	41	1	54	96	1

== Sessions ==
- 1st Regular session: January 13, 1858 – March 17, 1858

== Leaders ==
=== Senate leadership ===
- President of the Senate: Erasmus D. Campbell, Lieutenant Governor
- President pro tempore: Hiram H. Giles

=== Assembly leadership ===
- Speaker of the Assembly: Frederick S. Lovell

== Members ==
=== Members of the Senate ===
Members of the Wisconsin Senate for the Eleventh Wisconsin Legislature (30):

Senate partisan representation Democratic: 12 seats Republican: 18 seats

District	Counties	Senator	Party	Residence
01	Sheboygan	Elijah Fox Cook	Dem.	Sheboygan
02	Brown, Door, Kewaunee, Oconto, Outagamie, Shawanaw	Morgan Lewis Martin	Dem.	Green Bay
03	Ozaukee	Herman J. Schulteis	Dem.	Port Washington
04	Washington	Densmore W. Maxon	Dem.	Cedar Creek
05	Milwaukee (Northern Half)	Augustus Greulich	Dem.	Milwaukee
06	Milwaukee (Southern Half)	Patrick Walsh	Dem.	Milwaukee
07	Racine	Champion S. Chase	Rep.	Racine
08	Kenosha	Samuel R. McClellan	Rep.	Wilmot
09	Adams, Juneau, Sauk	John T. Kingston	Rep.	Necedah
10	Waukesha	Denison Worthington	Rep.	Summit
11	Dane (Eastern Part)	Hiram H. Giles	Rep.	Stoughton
12	Walworth	John W. Boyd	Rep.	Geneva
13	Lafayette	Philemon B. Simpson	Dem.	Shullsburg
14	Jefferson (Northern Part) and Dodge (Southern Part)	William Chappell	Dem.	Watertown
15	Iowa, Richland	Lemuel W. Joiner	Rep.	Wyoming
16	Grant	Noah H. Virgin	Rep.	Platteville
17	Rock (Western Part)	James Sutherland	Rep.	Janesville
18	Rock (Eastern Part)	Alden I. Bennett	Rep.	Beloit
19	Manitowoc, Calumet	Temple Clark	Dem.	Manitowoc
20	Fond du Lac	Edward Pier	Rep.	Fond du Lac
21	Winnebago	Edwin Wheeler	Rep.	Oshkosh
22	Dodge (Northern Part)	William E. Smith	Rep.	Fox Lake
23	Jefferson (Southern Part)	Samuel C. Bean	Rep.	Lake Mills
24	Green	John H. Warren	Rep.	Albany
25	Columbia	Moses M. Davis	Rep.	Portage
26	Dane (Western Part)	Andrew Proudfit	Dem.	Madison
27	Marathon, Portage, Waupaca, Waushara, Wood	Luther Hanchett	Rep.	Plover
28	Burnett, Chippewa, Clark, Douglas, Dunn, Eau Claire, La Pointe, Pierce, Polk, St. Croix	Daniel Mears	Dem.	Osceola Mills
29	Marquette	Martin L. Kimball	Rep.	Berlin
30	Bad Ax, Buffalo, Crawford, Jackson, La Crosse, Monroe, Tremealeau	William H. Tucker	Dem.	La Crosse

=== Members of the Assembly ===
Members of the Assembly for the Eleventh Wisconsin Legislature:

Senate partisan representation Democratic: 44 seats Republican: 53 seats

Senate District	County	District	Representative	Party	Residence
09	Adams & Juneau		Almon P. Ayers	Rep.	Quincy
28	Ashland, Burnett, Douglas, La Pointe, Polk, St. Croix		James B. Gray	Rep.	Hudson
30	Bad Ax, Crawford		James R. Savage	Dem.	Springville
02	Brown		Edgar Conklin	Dem.	Green Bay
30	Buffalo, Jackson, Trempealeau		Harlow E. Prickett	Dem.	Black River Falls
19	Calumet		James Robinson	Dem.	Chilton
28	Chippewa, Clark, Dunn, Pierce		Lucius Cannon	Rep.	Pepin
25	Columbia	1	Alvin B. Alden	Dem.	Portage
25	Columbia	2	William M. Griswold	Rep.	Columbus
25	Columbia	3	Jonathan W. Earle	Rep.	Pardeeville
11	Dane	1	Daniel B. Crandall	Rep.	Utica
11	Dane	2	John E. Sharp	Rep.	Door Creek
11	Dane	3	Storer W. Field	Rep.	Fitchburg
26	Dane	4	Henry K. Belding	Dem.	Black Earth
26	Dane	5	Frank Gault	Dem.	Pheasant Branch
26	Dane	6	Alexander A. McDonell	Rep.	Madison
22	Dodge	1	John Steiner	Dem.	Woodland
22	Dodge	2	Narcisse Juneau	Dem.	Theresa
22	Dodge	3	Paul Juneau	Dem.	Juneau
22	Dodge	4	Benjamin F. Gibbs	Rep.	Fox Lake
22	Dodge	5	Frederick H. Kribs	Rep.	Beaver Dam
22	Dodge	6	Edward J. Williams	Rep.	Elba
02	Door, Kewaunee, Oconto, Shawano		Jonathan C. Hall	Dem.	Marinette
20	Fond du Lac	1	Edmund L. Runals	Rep.	Ripon
20	Fond du Lac	2	Henry D. Hitt	Rep.	Oakfield
20	Fond du Lac	3	Frank D. McCarty	Dem.	Fond du Lac
20	Fond du Lac	4	Joseph Wagner	Dem.	Dotyville
20	Fond du Lac	5	William S. Tuttle	Dem.	New Fane
16	Grant	1	Henry D. York	Dem.	Hazel Green
16	Grant	2	Albert W. Emery	Dem.	Potosi
16	Grant	3	Hanmer Robbins	Rep.	Platteville
16	Grant	4	Charles K. Dean	Rep.	Boscobel
16	Grant	5	Henry Patch	Dem.	Patch Grove
24	Green	1	James E. Vinton	Rep.	Albany
24	Green	2	William G. Brown	Rep.	Skinner
15	Iowa	1	Henry M. Billings	Dem.	Constance
15	Iowa	2	Levi Sterling	Rep.	Mineral Point
23	Jefferson	1	Miles Holmes	Rep.	Palmyra
23	Jefferson	2	George C. Smith	Rep.	Oakland
14	Jefferson	3	Peter Rogan	Dem.	Watertown
14	Jefferson	4	John Gibb	Dem.	Oconomowoc
14	Jefferson	5	Harlow Pease	Rep.	Waterloo
08	Kenosha	1	Frederick S. Lovell	Rep.	Kenosha
08	Kenosha	2	Almond D. Cornwell	Rep.	Salem
30	La Crosse & Monroe		James D. Condit	Dem.	Sparta
13	Lafayette	1	Hamilton H. Gray	Dem.	Darlington
13	Lafayette	2	Charles Bracken	Dem.	Mineral Point
13	Lafayette	3	James H. Earnest	Dem.	New Diggings
19	Manitowoc	1	Henry C. Hamilton	Dem.	Two Rivers
19	Manitowoc	2	James B. Dunn	Dem.	Manitowoc
27	Marathon, Portage, Wood		Burton Millard	Rep.	Wausau
29	Marquette	1	Samuel W. Mather	Dem.	Markesan
29	Marquette	2	Dominic K. Devaney	Dem.	Montello
05	Milwaukee	1	Dighton Corson	Dem.	Milwaukee
05	Milwaukee	2	Alex. Cotzhausen	Dem.	Milwaukee
06	Milwaukee	3	John Hayden	Dem.	Milwaukee
06	Milwaukee	4	Duncan E. Cameron	Dem.	Milwaukee
06	Milwaukee	5	Mitchell Steever	Dem.	Milwaukee
05	Milwaukee	6	Frederick R. Berg	Dem.	Milwaukee
05	Milwaukee	7	Michael Hanrahan	Dem.	Good Hope
06	Milwaukee	8	Joseph Carney	Dem.	Wauwatosa
06	Milwaukee	9	Orlando Ellsworth	Rep.	Milwaukee
02	Outagamie		Perry H. Smith	Dem.	Appleton
03	Ozaukee	1	Alexander M. Alling	Dem.	Saukville
03	Ozaukee	2	B. O. Zastrow Kussow	Dem.	Cedarburg
07	Racine	1	Hermon Warner	Dem.	Racine
07	Racine	2	George W. Selden	Rep.	Racine
07	Racine	3	Samuel Collins	Rep.	Yorkville
07	Racine	4	Edward Dyer	Rep.	Burlington
15	Richland		Charles G. Rodolf	Dem.	Orion
18	Rock	1	George Irish	Rep.	Clinton
18	Rock	2	William Hubbard Stark	Rep.	Shopiere
17	Rock	3	James H. Knowlton	Rep.	Janesville
17	Rock	4	Zebulon P. Burdick	Rep.	Janesville
17	Rock	5	Kiron W. Bemis	Rep.	Janesville
09	Sauk	1	Samuel H. Bassinger	Rep.	Prairie du Sac
09	Sauk	2	Samuel Northrup	Rep.	Dellona
01	Sheboygan	1	Zebulon P. Mason	Dem.	Sheboygan
01	Sheboygan	2	William H. Prentice	Rep.	Sheboygan Falls
01	Sheboygan	3	Abraham H. Van Wie	Rep.	Cascade
12	Walworth	1	John McKibbin	Rep.	Geneva
12	Walworth	2	Elijah Easton	Rep.	Walworth
12	Walworth	3	Butler G. Noble	Rep.	Whitewater
12	Walworth	4	James Baker	Rep.	East Troy
04	Washington	1	James Kenealy	Dem.	Toland's Prairie
04	Washington	2	Paul A. Weil	Dem.	Richfield
04	Washington	3	Charles W. Detmering	Dem.	Newburg
10	Waukesha	1	Albert Alden	Rep.	Delafield
10	Waukesha	2	Oliver P. Hullett	Rep.	Menomonee Falls
10	Waukesha	3	David Roberts	Dem.	North Prairie
10	Waukesha	4	George McWhorter	Rep.	Waukesha
10	Waukesha	5	Charles S. Hawley	Rep.	Waukesha
27	Waupaca		Andrew J. Dufur	Rep.	Iola
27	Waushara		William C. Webb	Rep.	Wautoma
21	Winnebago	1	Samuel M. Hay	Rep.	Oshkosh
21	Winnebago	2	William Duchman	Rep.	Menasha
21	Winnebago	3	William P. McAllister	Rep.	Omro

== Employees ==
=== Senate employees ===
- Chief Clerk: John L. V. Thomas
- Sergeant-at-Arms: Nathaniel L. Stout

=== Assembly employees ===
- Chief Clerk: L. H. D. Crane
- Sergeant-at-Arms: Francis Massing
