= George Molinaro =

American politician (1902–1978)

62nd Speaker of the Wisconsin Assembly
- In office January 5, 1959 – January 2, 1961
- Preceded by: Robert G. Marotz
- Succeeded by: David Blanchard

Minority Leader of the Wisconsin State Assembly
- In office January 1, 1951 – January 3, 1955
- Preceded by: Leland McParland
- Succeeded by: Robert T. Huber

Member of the Wisconsin State Assembly
- In office January 1, 1973 – January 3, 1977
- Preceded by: District created
- Succeeded by: Joseph F. Andrea
- Constituency: 64th district
- In office January 3, 1955 – January 1, 1973
- Preceded by: Joseph Lourigan
- Succeeded by: District abolished
- Constituency: Kenosha 1st district
- In office January 6, 1947 – January 3, 1955
- Preceded by: Matt G. Siebert
- Succeeded by: Joseph Lourigan
- Constituency: Kenosha 2nd district

Personal details
- Born: October 1, 1902 Kenosha, Wisconsin, U.S.
- Died: September 29, 1978 (aged 75) University Hospital, Madison, Wisconsin
- Resting place: Saint George Cemetery, Kenosha, Wisconsin
- Party: Democratic
- Spouse: Madeleine R. Jensen (m. 1946–1978)
- Relatives: Al Molinaro (brother); Joseph Molinaro (brother)

George E. Molinaro (October 1, 1902 – September 29, 1978) was an American businessman and politician. He was the 74th Speaker of the Wisconsin State Assembly. A Democrat, he served a total of 30 years in the Assembly, representing Kenosha, Wisconsin, and was a member of the Democratic Assembly caucus leadership for many years. He was also one of the charter members of UAW Local 72 in Kenosha, and was involved in the leadership of that Local for more than a decade.

== Early life and career ==
Born in Kenosha, Wisconsin, Molinaro was educated in the Kenosha public schools and attended the Kenosha Business College before going to work as an auto worker and production inspector at the Nash Motors plant in Kenosha. There, he became involved with the United Auto Workers union and was one of the charter members of Kenosha's UAW Local 72. He served four years as vice president of Local 72, and was a member of the executive committee for twelve years. Molinaro worked at Nash Motors through its transition to American Motors Corporation, and retired from American Motors after 45 years of labor in 1965.

== Political career ==
Molinaro made his first attempt at elected office in 1937, running unsuccessfully for the Kenosha County Board of Supervisors. He ran again in 1939, this time winning the seat. He ultimately served on the county board through 1947.

In 1946, Molinaro launched a primary challenge against incumbent state representative Matt G. Siebert. In the August primary, Molinaro narrowly defeated Siebert, taking 53% of the vote. Siebert, however, after losing the primary chose to run as an independent. Molinaro prevailed with 46% in the general election over Siebert and Republican candidate George E. Mahoney. Two years later, in 1948, Siebert returned to run as a Republican; Molinaro defeated him for a third time. Molinaro was subsequently reelected another thirteen times.

In the Assembly, Molinaro served in several leadership positions in the Democratic caucus. He was Democratic minority leader for the 1951–1952 and 1953–1954 sessions, was chosen as Speaker of the Wisconsin State Assembly when the Democrats held the Assembly majority in the 74th Wisconsin Legislature (1959–1960), was speaker pro tempore for 1965–1966 session, and was Democratic caucus chairman for the 1961–1962, 1963–1964, and 1967–1968 sessions. He was, for several sessions, chairman of the Assembly Rules Committee, and was a member or chairman of the powerful Joint Finance Committee for nearly his entire Assembly career.

One of his chief accomplishments in the Wisconsin Legislature was the passage of a series of laws in 1965 which established two new branches of the University of Wisconsin System—University of Wisconsin–Parkside and University of Wisconsin–Green Bay. He had worked for years to establish a University of Wisconsin branch in the Kenosha–Racine area. In recognition for his efforts to establish the branch and for his efforts to support funding for higher education in the state, UW–Parkside made him an honorary alumnus, and University of Wisconsin awarded him an honorary doctorate.

== Later years ==
In 1961, while serving in the Legislature, Molinaro became involved in the founding of American State Bank in Kenosha. He served as the first president of the bank and was then chairman of the bank until his death in 1978.

== Personal life and legacy ==
Molinaro was a first generation Italian American. His parents, Raffaele (Ralph) and Teresa Molinaro (née Marano), had immigrated to the United States from the province of Cosenza in the Kingdom of Italy. He had nine brothers and sisters, including television actor Al Molinaro and Kenosha County district attorney Joseph Molinaro.

George Molinaro married Madeleine R. Jensen on March 2, 1946, at Kenosha's Holy Rosary Catholic Church.

Molinaro was a frequent smoker and was rarely seen without a cigar or cigarette. He died at age 76 at University of Wisconsin Hospital in Madison, Wisconsin, after suffering from cancer and emphysema for several months.

After his death, University of Wisconsin–Parkside named a major building complex George Molinaro Hall in his honor.

== Electoral history ==
=== Wisconsin Assembly, Kenosha 2nd district (1946–1952) ===
Year	Election	Date	Elected				Defeated				Total	Plurality
1946	Primary	August 13	George Molinaro	Democratic	1,392	53.39%	Matt G. Siebert (inc.)	Dem.	1,215	46.61%	2,607	177
1946	General	November 5	George Molinaro	Democratic	6,022	46.05%	George E. Mahoney	Rep.	4,325	33.07%	13,077	1,697
1946	General	November 5	George Molinaro	Democratic	6,022	46.05%	Matt G. Siebert (inc.)	Ind.	2,730	20.88%	13,077	1,697
1948	General	November 2	George Molinaro (inc.)	Democratic	9,251	56.58%	Matt G. Siebert	Rep.	7,099	43.42%	16,350	2,152
1950	General	November 7	George Molinaro (inc.)	Democratic	8,757	58.28%	Lawrence Carpenter	Rep.	6,270	41.72%	15,027	2,487
1952	General	November 4	George Molinaro (inc.)	Democratic	11,891	57.95%	Lawrence Jacobs	Rep.	8,629	42.05%	20,520	3,262

=== Wisconsin Assembly, Kenosha 1st district (1954–1970) ===
Year	Election	Date	Elected				Defeated				Total	Plurality
1954	Primary	September 14	George Molinaro	Democratic	5,649	83.88%	Albin H. Zalubowski	Dem.	1,086	16.12%	6,735	4,563
1954	General	November 2	George Molinaro (inc.)	Democratic	10,369	100.0%					10,369	10,369
1956	General	November 6	George Molinaro (inc.)	Democratic	11,855	72.32%	Alvin E. Johnson	Rep.	4,537	27.68%	16,392	7,318
1958	Primary	September 9	George Molinaro (inc.)	Democratic	5,215	63.85%	Joseph Lourigan	Dem.	2,952	36.15%	8,167	2,263
1958	General	November 4	George Molinaro (inc.)	Democratic	10,659	100.0%					10,659	10,659
1960	General	November 8	George Molinaro (inc.)	Democratic	13,686	100.0%					13,686	13,686
1962	Primary	September 11	George Molinaro (inc.)	Democratic	4,411	71.19%	Peter R. Marshall	Dem.	1,785	28.81%	6,196	2,626
1962	General	November 6	George Molinaro (inc.)	Democratic	10,328	100.0%					10,328	10,328
1964	General	November 3	George Molinaro (inc.)	Democratic	17,207	100.0%					17,207	17,207
1966	General	November 8	George Molinaro (inc.)	Democratic	10,688	70.68%	Joseph R. Kautzer	Rep.	4,433	29.32%	15,121	6,255
1968	General	November 5	George Molinaro (inc.)	Democratic	14,723	100.0%					14,723	14,723
1970	General	November 3	George Molinaro (inc.)	Democratic	12,472	79.54%	William L. McCartin	Rep.	3,208	20.46%	15,680	9,264

=== Wisconsin Assembly, 64th district (1972, 1974) ===
Year	Election	Date	Elected				Defeated				Total	Plurality
1972	Primary	September 12	George Molinaro	Democratic	3,581	63.63%	Dominick J. Salerno	Dem.	2,047	36.37%	5,628	1,534
1972	General	November 7	George Molinaro	Democratic	11,113	74.25%	Joseph Rodriguez	Rep.	3,855	25.75%	14,968	7,258
1974	Primary	September 10	George Molinaro (inc.)	Democratic	2,332	67.59%	Gerald F. Bellow	Dem.	1,118	32.41%	3,450	1,214
1974	General	November 5	George Molinaro (inc.)	Democratic	7,220	100.0%					7,220	7,220

Wisconsin State Assembly
Preceded by Matt G. Siebert	Member of the Wisconsin State Assembly from the Kenosha 2nd district January 6, 1947 – January 3, 1955	Succeeded by Joseph Lourigan
Preceded by Joseph Lourigan	Member of the Wisconsin State Assembly from the Kenosha 1st district January 3, 1955 – January 1, 1973	District abolished
New district	Member of the Wisconsin State Assembly from the 64th district January 1, 1973 – January 3, 1977	Succeeded by Joseph F. Andrea
Preceded by Robert G. Marotz	Speaker of the Wisconsin State Assembly; January 5, 1959 – January 2, 1961	Succeeded by David Blanchard
