= Senator Thorp =

Senator Thorp may refer to:

- Herman Thorp (1809–1892), Wisconsin State Senate
- Joseph G. Thorp (1812–1895), Wisconsin State Senate

== See also ==
- Frederick Thorpe (fl. 1860s–1870s), Wisconsin State Senate
