= Shopiere Congregational Church =

Historic church in Wisconsin, United States

- U.S. National Register of Historic Places
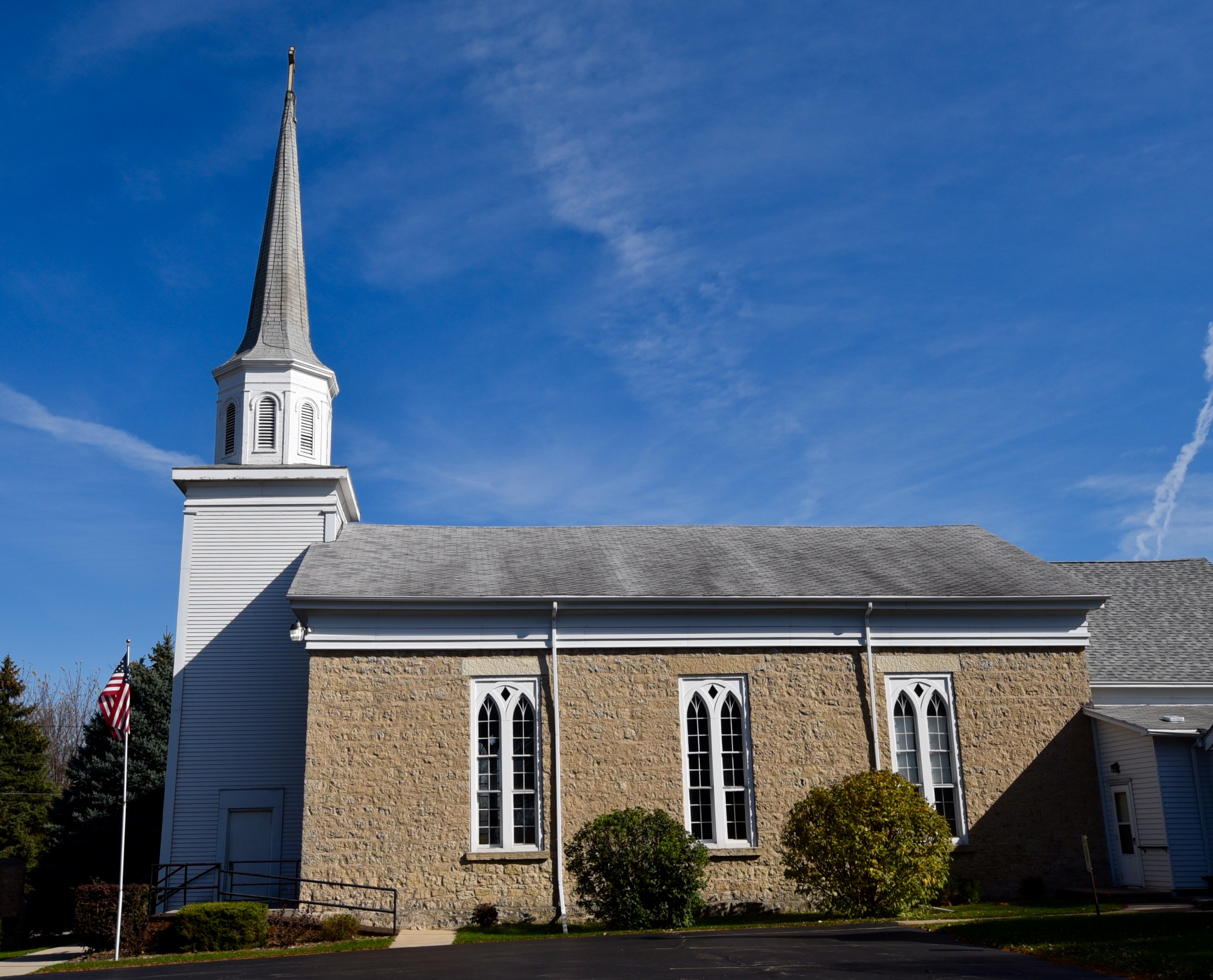

- Location within Wisconsin Location within the United States
- Nearest city: Shopiere, Wisconsin
- Coordinates: 42°34′14″N 88°56′17″W
- Area: less than one acre
- Built: 1853
- Architectural style: Greek Revival
- NRHP reference No.: 76000078
- Added to NRHP: August 13, 1976

Shopiere Congregational Church is a historic Congregational church in Shopiere, Wisconsin, United States. It was built in 1853 and was added to the National Register of Historic Places in 1976.

The Shopiere congregation was established in 1844 by Reverend Stephen Peet, riding over from Beloit. The members initially met in a log schoolhouse, then in a small chapel which they built at the south end of the church before the church was built. In 1850 they began constructing the main block of the building pictured.

That main block has walls of rough-cut locally quarried limestone laid in courses. Its style is simple Greek Revival, suggested by the pitch of the roof, the frieze board, and the entablature in the gable end. The main block was completed in 1853 at a cost of $2,000. The tower at the front was added in the following years, rectangular and wooden with two round-arched windows on the front and an entry door on each side. Resting on the tower is an octagonal belfry, and from that rises a graceful steeple topped with a cross. The style of the tower and belfry are rather unusual for Wisconsin, and may result from some early members' New England origins. In 1871 the tall Gothic-styled pointed-arch windows were added on the sides of the church, and the original chapel at the back was replaced with a new chapel.

Louis P. Harvey, briefly governor of Wisconsin during the Civil War, is the most famous member of the Shopiere congregation. Today the church is probably the second oldest continuously used church in Rock County.
