= David Harvey (Ohio politician) =

American politician (1892–1871)

Member of the Ohio House of Representatives from the Cuyahoga County district
- In office December 4, 1843 – December 7, 1846 Serving with Samuel McIlrath (1843–1844), John M. Woolsey (1844–1845), No co-representative (1845–1846)
- Preceded by: Thomas M. Kelley
- Succeeded by: Franklin T. Backus & Theodore Breck

Personal details
- Born: November 1, 1792 East Haddam, Connecticut, U.S.
- Died: February 23, 1871 (aged 78) Shopiere, Wisconsin, U.S.
- Party: Whig
- Spouse: Almira Powell (m. 1815–1871)
- Children: Oliver Harvey^{(b. 1817; before 1828)}; Louis Powell Harvey^{(b. 1820; died 1862)}; John Stanley Harvey^{(b. 1824; died 1894)}; George Harvey^{(b. 1834; died young)}
- Occupation: Farmer

David Harvey (November 1, 1792 – February 23, 1871) was an American farmer, Whig politician, and Ohio pioneer. He served three terms in the Ohio House of Representatives, representing Cuyahoga County from 1843 to 1846.

He was the father of Louis P. Harvey, the 7th governor of Wisconsin.

== Biography ==
David Harvey was born in Hadlyme, East Haddam, Connecticut, in 1792. He was raised and educated in Hadlyme, and resided on his father's farm there until 1819, when he settled his own farm in Millington, Connecticut. He farmed there until 1828, when he was able to purchase a large tract of land in Strongsville, in Cuyahoga County, Ohio.

In the fall of 1843, Harvey was elected to represent Cuyahoga County in the Ohio House of Representatives, running on the Whig Party ticket. He was re-elected two times, serving from December 1843 through December 1846.

In 1848, Harvey moved west to Shopiere, Wisconsin, where his son Louis had established a homestead. He lived a quiet and retired life in Wisconsin.

David Harvey died suddenly at his home in Shopiere on February 22 or 23, 1871.

== Personal life and family ==
David Harvey was one of at least four children born to Ithamar Harvey Jr. (1767–1848) and his wife Electa (née Fowler; 1767–1826). The Harvey family were descendants of Thomas Harvey (1617–1651), who emigrated to the Massachusetts Bay Colony in 1636 with his brother William (1614–1658).

David Harvey married Almira Powell in June 1815. They had four children together, though only two survived to adulthood. Their elder son was Louis P. Harvey, who went on to become a prominent Republican politician in Wisconsin, and served as the 7th governor of Wisconsin.
