= Emil Costello =

American politician (1908–1994)

Emil Antonio Costello (January 2, 1908 – February 9, 1994) was an American furniture worker and labor union activist from Kenosha, Wisconsin who served one term as a member of the Wisconsin State Assembly from Kenosha County. While he was elected as a Progressive, he was frequently accused of being a communist or fellow traveler who urged others to join the party.

== Background ==
Costello was born January 2, 1908, in Kenosha. He attended Kenosha public schools, and became an assembler at the Simmons Bedding Company factory there. He helped organize and became president of an AFL Directly Affiliated Local Union there, which was later dissolved at the AFL's insistence, and assigned to the Upholsterers International Union of North America (UIU). He was on the state governing council of the Wisconsin State Federation of Labor.

== Assembly and UFWA ==
In 1936, Costello was elected as a Progressive from the Assembly's 2nd Kenosha County district (the Towns of Brighton, Bristol, Paris, Pleasant Prairie, Randall, Salem, Somers, and Wheatland; the Village of Silver Lake; and the 1st, 5th, 6th, 7th, and 11th Wards of the City of Kenosha), unseating Democratic incumbent Matt G. Siebert in a three-way race, with 5,144 votes to Siebert's 4,712 and Republican Jay Rhodes' 3,539. He was assigned to the standing committees on labor and on transportation.

In 1937, he was one of a group of labor activists who led a breakaway movement, taking the Simmons local of the UIU and several others out of the Upholsterers and forming a new union, the United Furniture Workers of America (UFWA) which advocated industrial unionism, and affiliated immediately with the Congress of Industrial Organizations. He was expelled from the AFL, became interim president of the Wisconsin CIO (he would serve from 1937-1939) and was hired as an organizer by the CIO. An effort was made to censure Costello for excessive absences from the Assembly, but was decisively defeated. When he came up for re-election in 1938, he faced two challengers in the Progressive primary (which he won). He was again accused of "holding communist views", and lost in the general election to Siebert, who took his old seat back with 4,730 votes to Costello's 3,420 and Republican James Brook's 3,152.

== After the Assembly ==
Costello ended up working for the CIO's Steel Workers Organizing Committee and the successor United Steelworkers until 1947. By 1961, when he was hauled before the House Unamerican Activities Committee, he was running an employment agency in California. He died February 9, 1994, in San Diego, California, where he had been living.
