= Almon Cornwell =

19th century American politician

Almon D. Cornwell
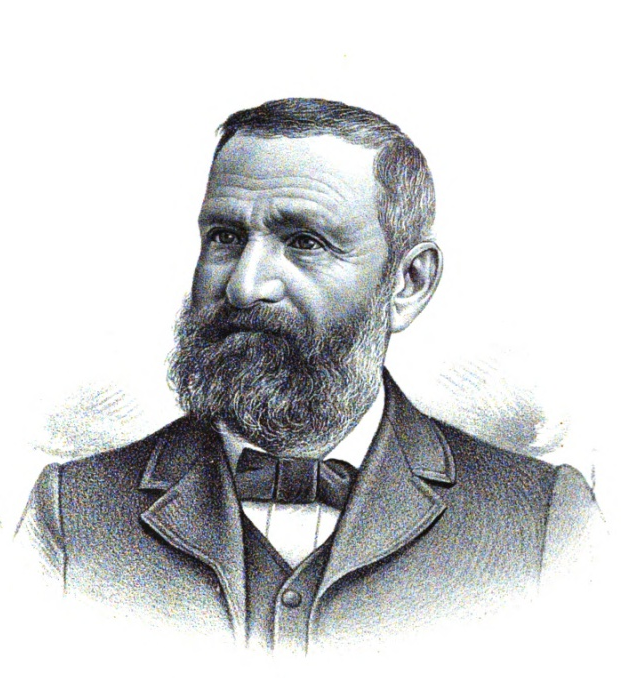
- From Portrait and Biographical Album of Racine and Kenosha Counties, Wisconsin (1892)

Member of the Wisconsin State Assembly from the Kenosha 2nd district
- In office January 4, 1858 – January 3, 1859
- Preceded by: Lathrop Burgess
- Succeeded by: James C. McKisson

Personal details
- Born: March 30, 1802 Greenfield, New York, U.S.
- Died: November 8, 1893 (aged 73) Salem, Wisconsin, U.S.
- Resting place: Salem Mound Cemetery, Salem Lakes, Wisconsin
- Party: Republican; Whig (before 1854)
- Spouse: Cordelia Tichnor (m. 1841–1893)
- Children: Unnamed baby^{(died in infancy)}; Julia (Johnson)^{(b. 1843; died 1921)}; Charles F. Cornwell^{(b. 1846; died 1864)}; Edwin A. Cornwell^{(b. 1849; died 1921)}; Frank E. Cornwell^{(b. 1851; died 1910)}; Adelbert R. Cornwell^{(b. 1854; died 1928)}; Ellen (Wicks)^{(died after 1892)}; Flora A. (Turner)^{(b. 1856; died 1929)}; Dora A. (Struck) (Acker)^{(b. 1859; died 1907)}
- Occupation: Farmer

Almon D. Cornwell (March 30, 1820 – November 8, 1893) was an American farmer, politician, and Wisconsin pioneer. He was a member of the Wisconsin State Assembly, representing Kenosha County in the 1858 session.

== Biography ==
Almon D. Cornwell was born March 30, 1820, in Greenfield, New York. He was educated in the common schools in New York, and then taught school for two terms.

He moved west in 1844, accompanied by his father-in-law, William Tichnor, and bought land in the town of Salem, in what is now Kenosha County, Wisconsin. He gradually expanded his estate from 80 acres to 600 acres. He served as chairman of the town of Salem and, in 1857, he was elected to the Wisconsin State Assembly, representing western Kenosha County. He served in the 11th Wisconsin Legislature.

Cornwell died of a stroke at his home in Salem, on November 8, 1893.

== Personal life and family ==
Almon Cornwell married Cordelia Tichnor in Cayuga County, New York, on June 13, 1841. They had at least nine children, though one died in infancy. Their eldest son Charles was drafted into the Union Army at age 18 and died of dysentery at Nashville, Tennessee, just a few months before the end of the war.

Wisconsin State Assembly
Preceded by Lathrop Burgess	Member of the Wisconsin State Assembly from the Kenosha 2nd district January 4, 1858 – January 3, 1859	Succeeded by James C. McKisson
