= Frederick Thorpe (politician) =

19th century American politician

Frederick Thorp

President pro tempore of the Wisconsin Senate
- In office January 6, 1862 – September 10, 1862
- Preceded by: Alden I. Bennett
- Succeeded by: Gerry Whiting Hazelton

Member of the Wisconsin Senate from the 4th district
- In office January 6, 1862 – January 6, 1868
- Preceded by: Densmore Maxon
- Succeeded by: Adam Schantz

District Attorney of Washington County, Wisconsin
- In office May 1855 – January 1857
- Preceded by: John Shelley
- Succeeded by: Edmund Neff

Personal details
- Born: c.1833 New York, U.S.
- Died: c.1890
- Party: Democratic
- Spouses: Anna Maria French (m. 1853, divorced); Lydia Lucillia Yerkes (m. 1888)
- Children: George H. Thorp^{(b. 1854; died 1879)}; Herman S. Thorp^{(b. 1857; died 1866)}; Fred Ward Thorp^{(b. 1860; died 1931)}
- Parent: Hermon Thorp (father)

Frederick O. Thorp (c.1833 – c.1890) was an American lawyer, Democratic politician, and Wisconsin pioneer. He served six years in the Wisconsin Senate, representing Washington County from 1862 to 1868; he was president pro tempore of the Senate for the regular sessions of the 15th Wisconsin Legislature. He earlier served as district attorney of Washington County, and prosecuted the lynch mob in the George DeBar lynching of 1855. In historical documents, his last name is sometimes spelled "Thorpe", and his name is often abbreviated as F. O. Thorp.

His father, Hermon Thorp, was one of the earliest American settlers in what is now Kenosha County, Wisconsin, and also served in the Wisconsin Legislature.

== Early life ==
Frederick Thorp was born about 1833, and came to the Wisconsin Territory with his parents about 1839, settling in the area that's now the Kenosha County, Wisconsin. After receiving an education and becoming a lawyer, he moved north to West Bend, Wisconsin, in Washington County. Shortly after arriving in West Bend, he entered a law partnership with John Shelley, who was then district attorney and would later become county judge.

== DeBar lynching ==
In a spring 1855 special election, Thorp was elected district attorney of Washington County, running on the Democratic Party ticket. Shortly after his election, one of the few known lynchings in Wisconsin took place in Washington County. George DeBar was a 19-year-old laborer, who sympathized with the extreme anti-immigrant Know Nothing movement. On August 1, 1855, he attacked his employer—a German immigrant named John Muehr—along with his wife and another teenage farmhand named Paul Winderling; DeBar killed Winderling in the attack, grievously wounded Muehr and his wife, and set fire to the Muehr household.

The politically charged nature of the killing excited the large immigrant community in Washington County, creating a dangerous environment and prompting an unusually speedy trial. A special session of the circuit court was held at West Bend on August 7, and Thorp quickly secured an indictment from the grand jury, with a jury trial scheduled to occur the following day. The sheriff brought out two escort companies of militia from neighboring Ozaukee and Milwaukee counties to attempt to safely escort DeBar to the jail for the night, but the sheriff's efforts proved insufficient. A massive crowd overwhelmed the guard, apprehended DeBar, beat him, crushed his skull with a stone, threw his body into the Milwaukee River, and ultimately hanged his body from a nearby bridge.

The lynching further excited all sides, with calls for an investigation and punishment of the lynch mob. The circuit judge, Charles H. Larrabee, was accused of violating the law in his rush to implement a trial for DeBar. The militia companies and their officers were accused of failing to actively defend the prisoner. The former state legislator, William P. Barnes, was accused of inflaming and encouraging the lynch mob. Many called for the reinstatement of the death penalty, which Wisconsin had abolished just two years earlier.

Thorp convened a special grand jury to investigate the lynching. The investigation ultimately identified 19 people, who were charged with murder by suffocation or strangulation. Thorp sought a change of venue, believing it would be impossible to find an impartial Washington County jury, but was refused by the judge, Larrabee. Thorp was assisted in the prosecution by the prominent Milwaukee attorney and politician Henry L. Palmer; the defense was represented by the future state Supreme Court chief justice Harlow S. Orton. After the prosecution presented their case, the judge immediately ordered a directed verdict of acquittal for six of the defendants, finding no evidence to sustain a charge against them. For the remaining defendants, the defense argued that they were not guilty because DeBar was already dead before he was hanged, which did not match the charged offense of murder by suffocation or strangulation. After deliberating for nine hours, the jury acquitted the remaining defendants on that basis, finding that while the evidence presented at trial was fairly conclusive that the defendants had participated in the murder, the charged crimes did not match the evidence presented.

Thorp did not run for re-election in 1856.

== State Senate ==
After his term as district attorney, Thorp maintained an active legal practice in West Bend, with bilingual services for German-speaking clientele.

Thorp remained active with the Democratic Party after the start of the American Civil War, but was considered a War Democrat in 1861. In 1861, he received the Democratic nomination for Wisconsin Senate in the 4th Senate district, which at that time comprised just Washington County. Thorp won the election, and at the same election, his father Hermon Thorp was elected state senator from Kenosha County, running on the Republican ticket. In the Senate, despite Republicans holding the majority, Thorp was elected president pro tempore, a role that became more relevant than normal in that legislative term due to the death of Governor Louis P. Harvey in April 1862. Harvey's death meant that Lieutenant Governor Edward Salomon became governor, leaving the office of lieutenant governor—and president of the Senate—vacant. Thorp was the presiding officer of the Senate during its June session that year. In August, Thorp was also designated by the governor to assist in raising a regiment of volunteers for the Union Army from Washington and Ozaukee counties, and to recommend men to serve as officers in the regiment. Because of the timing and location, this is likely the recruiting effort that failed to secure enough volunteers, and necessitated a conscription drive that culminated in the 1862 Ozaukee Draft Riot on November 10, 1862.

Over time, Thorp became more strident in his opposition to the Lincoln administration, denouncing the Emancipation Proclamation and the suspension of habeas corpus, and calling for peace with the Confederacy. Thorp was renominated for another term in 1863 and was unopposed in the general election.

In 1865, Thorp was elected to the Democratic Party of Wisconsin state central committee, and that fall he was re-elected to a third two-year term. He did not run for a fourth Senate term in 1867.

== Later years ==
While serving in his last term in the Legislature, in 1866, Thorp was appointed to the University of Wisconsin Board of Regents by governor Lucius Fairchild, and re-appointed by Fairchild in 1870. After leaving the legislature, Thorp moved to Fond du Lac, Wisconsin. His name was mentioned by Wisconsin newspapers as a potential candidate for governor in 1869, but he never actively campaigned for the office. Thorp instead focused on his legal career, and became a leading member of the bar in Fond du Lac County before relocating to Racine, Wisconsin, in the 1880s. In Racine, Thorp reunited with his early West Bend law partner, John Shelley.

After the 1884 presidential election and the appointment of Wisconsin's William F. Vilas as U.S. postmaster general, newspapers began reporting that Thorp would be appointed a special inspector for the Post Office department. After hearing outrage from influential local Democrats, Vilas denied the rumor, but Thorp later gave evidence that Vilas had sent him paperwork to effectuate the appointment.

== Personal life and family ==
Frederick Thorp was the eldest of five known children born to Hermon Thorp and his wife Emeline (née Lacey). Hermon Thorp was one of the earliest American settlers in what is now Kenosha County, Wisconsin, maintained a successful sheep farm, and served as a Wisconsin state senator.

Frederick Thorp married Anna Maria French in 1853. They had three children together, though one son died in childhood, and another died at age 25. They separated about 1880, with Anna moving to Kansas with their remaining son, Fred Ward Thorp. Frederick married again in 1888, to the widow Lydia Lucillia Getchell (née Yerkes), and moved with her to Montana. Thorp died a short time later.

Wisconsin Senate
Preceded by Densmore Maxon	Member of the Wisconsin Senate from the 4th district January 6, 1862 – January 6, 1868	Succeeded by Adam Schantz
Preceded by Alden I. Bennett	President pro tempore of the Wisconsin Senate; January 6, 1862 – September 10, 1862	Succeeded by Gerry Whiting Hazelton
Legal offices
Preceded by John Shelley	District Attorney of Washington County, Wisconsin; May 1855 – January 1857	Succeeded by Edmund Neff
