= Obed Hale =

American farmer and politician (1809–1892)

Member of the Wisconsin State Assembly from the Kenosha 2nd district
- In office January 6, 1851 – January 5, 1852
- Preceded by: George M. Robinson (Racine 5th)
- Succeeded by: Lathrop Burgess

Personal details
- Born: 1809 Enfield, Connecticut, U.S.
- Died: 1892 (aged 82–83)
- Party: Free Soil
- Spouse: Laura B. King

Obed Pease Hale (1809–1892) was an American farmer and Wisconsin pioneer. He served one term in the Wisconsin State Assembly, representing Kenosha County in the first session after the county was created.

== Background ==
Obed P. Hale, son of Obed and Mindwell Hale, was born in Enfield, Connecticut, in 1809. At the age of seventeen he moved to Ohio, and became a farmer. He married Laura B. King, daughter of Jabez and Hannah King, and the first white child born in Chardon, Ohio. They had two sons and two daughters. In 1842, the Hales came to Wisconsin, and settled on a farm in the town of Paris in Kenosha County.

== Civic life ==
Hale was active in local politics, serving as a justice of the peace for about twenty-five years and holding other minor offices. When Kenosha County was separated from Racine County in April 1850, he was elected to the State Assembly running as a (Free Soil) Democrat. He was succeeded in 1852 by Lathrop Burgess, also a Free Soiler.

== Later life ==
In 1870, he left Paris for Kenosha, where he resided for the rest of his life. He died in 1892.
