= George Bennett (Wisconsin politician) =

Wisconsin merchant, pioneer, and politician (1810–1888)

Member of the Wisconsin Senate from the 8th district
- In office January 2, 1860 – January 6, 1862
- Preceded by: Samuel R. McClellan
- Succeeded by: Herman Thorp

Member of the Wisconsin State Assembly from the Kenosha 1st district
- In office January 3, 1859 – January 2, 1860
- Preceded by: Frederick S. Lovell
- Succeeded by: Meredith Howland

Member of the Kenosha City Council
- In office April 5, 1850 – April 1851

Personal details
- Born: 1810
- Died: 1888 (aged 77–78)
- Resting place: Green Ridge Cemetery, Kenosha, Wisconsin
- Party: Republican
- Spouses: Maria E. Bennett (died 1848); Julia Ann (Bullen) (died 1892)

George Bennett (1810–1888) was an American merchant and pioneer of Kenosha, Wisconsin. He was a member of the Wisconsin State Assembly in 1859 and of the Wisconsin State Senate from 1860 to 1861.

== Western Emigration Company ==
Bennett was a founder of the "Western Emigration Company" which was established in the winter of 1834-35 at the home of John Bullen, Jr., in Oswego County, New York. The company was created to formalize and fund their plans to move west, along with co-founders Charles W. Turner, Waters Towsley, James Scott, Dr. B. B. Cary, Jason Lothrop, Hudson Bacon, Peter Woodin, Alfred Foster, Orlando Foster, William Bullen, and Sidney Roberts.

The explorers of the company first arrived at Milwaukee, which was then still a part of the Michigan Territory but would shortly transfer to the new Wisconsin Territory. They investigated settling in Milwaukee, but found they could not come to a favorable agreement with Solomon Juneau, George H. Walker, and others who were already well-established in Milwaukee. They moved south to the mouth of the Root River, but found that area was also already settled—by Gilbert Knapp, William Luce, and others—in what would become Racine, Wisconsin. They nearly made an agreement here to join the settlement, but were ultimately rejected by the existing settlers. They continued south and came to the mouth of the Pike River, where they finally settled.

They named their settlement "Pike Creek", but, in 1837, it was renamed "Southport", and finally, in 1850, it became Kenosha, Wisconsin.

== Career ==
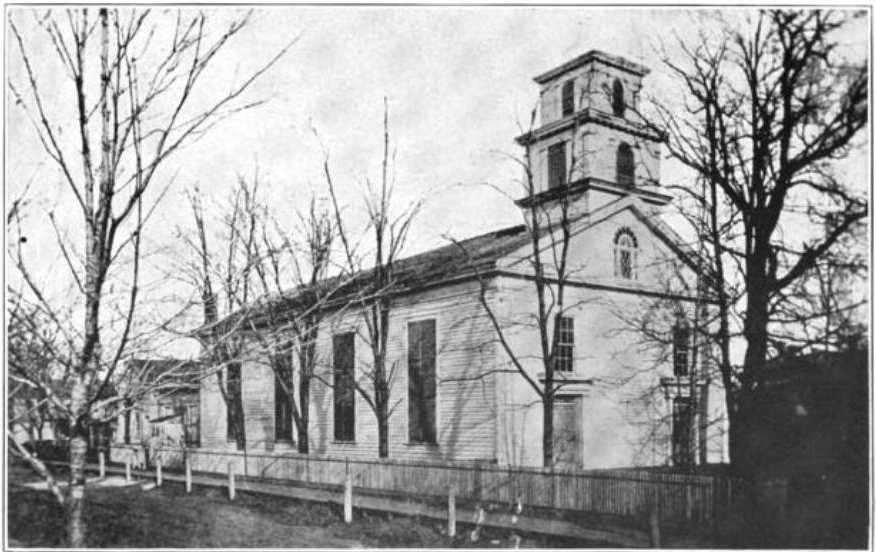
1872 photograph of the First Congregational Church of Kenosha at Park and Ashland, constructed in 1843 and moved in 1853.

In June 1838, Bennett was one of the founding members of the First Congregational Church in Southport, and was a member of the first board of trustees for the church. He would later become a Deacon of the church. He was also a founder and treasurer of the Kenosha County Bible Society, an auxiliary of the American Bible Society.

The Village of Southport was incorporated in 1841, and, in 1842, George Bennett was elected a trustee of the second village council. On April 5, 1850, the village board convened in special session to hand over authority to the newly incorporated City of Kenosha. Bennett was an Alderman on the first City Council of Kenosha and a Justice of the Peace.

Bennett partnered with William Bullen and Beach G. Spencer in establishing one of the first stores in the settlement, where they sold supplies imported from New York via ship. At some point, he formed a business partnership with William B. Sellick—Bennett & Sellick.

In politics, Bennett was one of the founders of the Kenosha branch of the abolitionist Liberty Party, a forerunner of the Free Soil Party, and, eventually, the Republican Party. The Liberty movement was very influential in the Kenosha-Racine area, which became one of the bastions of the Free Soil Party in the late 1840s, before eventually becoming a Republican stronghold in the early days of that party. In 1858, George Bennett was elected as a Republican to represent Kenosha in the Wisconsin State Assembly for the 1859 session. The next year, he was elected to the Wisconsin State Senate for 1860 and 1861, representing all of Kenosha County. In the Senate, he was a member of the Committee on Internal Improvements, from which he advocated for building up Kenosha's harbor and constructing a lighthouse.

When news of the attack on Fort Sumter reached Wisconsin, at the outbreak of the American Civil War, a meeting was called at the Kenosha courthouse for April 17, 1861. George Bennett was among the prominent men who addressed the assembled citizens and urged them to support the Union cause, along with former U.S. Senator Charles Durkee. Bennett himself was a significant donor to funding and equipping Wisconsin volunteer regiments.

Sometime after the civil war, Bennett relocated to Ontario, Illinois, where he continued to work as a merchant.

== Personal life ==
After the death of his first wife, Maria, he married Julia, the widow of William Bullen.

Wisconsin State Assembly
Preceded by Frederick S. Lovell	Member of the Wisconsin State Assembly from the Kenosha 1st district January 3, 1859 – January 2, 1860	Succeeded by Meredith Howland
Wisconsin Senate
Preceded by Samuel R. McClellan	Member of the Wisconsin Senate from the 8th district January 2, 1860 – January 6, 1862	Succeeded by Herman Thorp
