= Samuel R. McClellan =

19th century American politician

Samuel R. McClellan M.D.

Member of the Wisconsin Senate from the 8th district
- In office January 4, 1858 – January 2, 1860
- Preceded by: Christopher Latham Sholes
- Succeeded by: George Bennett

Personal details
- Born: March 19, 1806 Colrain, Massachusetts, U.S.
- Died: June 11, 1890 (aged 84) Kenosha, Wisconsin, U.S.
- Resting place: Green Ridge Cemetery, Kenosha
- Party: Republican
- Spouse: Catherine M. Garner (m. 1830; died 1878)
- Children: Elisabeth McClellan^{(b. 1827)}; Robert W. McClellan^{(b. 1831; died 1893)}; John James McClellan^{(b. 1833; died 1907)}; Mary Belle McClellan^{(b. 1835; died 1922)}; Sarah Duncan McClellan^{(b. 1838)}; Samuel McClellan^{(b. 1840; died 1887)}; Edward Garner McClellan^{(b. 1842; died 1897)}; Edwin McClellan^{(b. 1843)}; Catherine McClellan^{(b. 1844; died 1853)}; Jane McClellan^{(b. 1847; died 1854)}; Cynthia m. McClellan^{(b. 1850; died 1947)}
- Profession: Physician

Samuel R. McClellan (March 19, 1806 – June 11, 1890) was an American physician, politician, and Wisconsin pioneer. He was a member of the Wisconsin Senate, representing Kenosha County during the 1858 and 1859 sessions. He also served as a delegate to Wisconsin's 2nd constitutional convention, which produced the Constitution of Wisconsin.

== Early life ==
McClellan was born on March 19, 1806, in Colrain, Massachusetts. His father died in 1811, when McClellan was about five years old, and he went to live with his uncle, John McClellan, in Columbia County, New York. His uncle was a medical doctor, who instructed McClellan in the profession, then sent him to attend medical lectures in Boston in 1826 and 1827. McClellan was licensed to practice medicine in 1827 in Columbia County.

McClellqn practiced medicine with his uncle in Johnstown for most of the next 8 years, establishing a good reputation in the medical profession. In 1836, he moved his medical practice to Hudson, New York. He subsequently received an honorary degree from Jefferson Medical College and he served as president of the Medical Society of Columbia County for several years.

== Wisconsin career ==
In 1845, after 18 years practicing medicine, McClellan felt exhausted and was looking for a change. He decided to go to the Wisconsin Territory and landed at Southport (now Kenosha, Wisconsin) on July 5, 1845. In the fall of that year, he settled a farm near Kenosha in the area that is now Randall, Wisconsin. For the next several years, he divided his attention between farming and practicing medicine.

Two years after his arrival, in 1847, he was elected to represent Racine County at Wisconsin's second constitutional convention (at the time, Racine County included all the area that is now Kenosha County). At the constitutional convention, he served on the committee on the judiciary, and was well respected by the other delegates. The convention of 1847–1848 produced the Constitution of Wisconsin which was ratified by voters in the spring of 1848.

After Kenosha County was created from the southern half of Racine County, McClellan served several years as president of the Kenosha County Agricultural Society. Politically, McClellan was originally a member of the Democratic Party, but split with the party over the Kansas–Nebraska Act. He ran for Wisconsin Senate in 1857 on the Republican Party ticket and defeated Democratic nominee E. W. Evans.

McClellan represented the 8th Senate district during the 1858 and 1859 legislative sessions. His district at the time comprised all of Kenosha County.

After his time in the Legislature, he moved into the city of Kenosha, where he resumed his medical practice for much of the rest of his life, only retiring shortly before his death.

== Personal life and family ==
McClellan was the sixth of eight children born to Captain Robert McClellan and his wife Sarah Todd (née Duncan). His paternal grandfather, Hugh McClellan, served as a minuteman volunteer at the Battles of Lexington and Concord and was captain of a company at the time of British general John Burgoyne's surrender in 1777.

The McClellans were of Scottish descent, their ancestors arrived in America in 1723.

Samuel R. McClellan married Catherine M. Garner of Columbia County, New York, on October 27, 1830. Her family were recent immigrants from the Netherlands. They had eleven children together, though at least two died young. Their marriage lasted nearly 50 years, ending with Catherine's death in 1878.

Their son John James McClellan was a successful lawyer, who served as a district attorney and assistant attorney general of Wisconsin; he also served as a quartermaster in the Union Army during the American Civil War.

Samuel R. McClellan died at his home in Kenosha on June 11, 1890, after a long decline in health. At the time of his death, three sons and two daughters were said to be still living.

Wisconsin Senate
Preceded by Christopher Latham Sholes	Member of the Wisconsin Senate from the 8th district January 4, 1858 – January 2, 1860	Succeeded by George Bennett
