= Richard F. Stapleton =

American politician

Richard F. Stapleton (December 7, 1831 – ?) was an American educator and teacher.

Born in Granville, Michigan Territory, Stapleton was educated in the common schools and at the University of Wisconsin. He was a teacher and lived in Good Hope, Wisconsin. Stapleton served in the Wisconsin State Assembly, in 1877, as a Democrat.
