= United Furniture Workers of America =

Former trade union of the United States

The United Furniture Workers of America (UFWA) was a 20th-century American labor union, founded as a breakaway from the Upholsterers International Union of North America by a group of labor activists, who included Emil Costello (a Wisconsin state legislator and president of the UIU local at Simmons Bedding Company's original factory in Kenosha, Wisconsin) in 1937. The UFWA advocated industrial unionism and affiliated with the Congress of Industrial Organizations (which had formed in 1936).

Facing declining membership, even after President Carl Scarbrough moved the union's headquarters from New York City pursuing a policy of aggressively organizing in the Southern United States (where most furniture jobs had gone), in cooperation with other unions such as their former rivals the Upholsterers and the International Woodworkers of America, in 1987 the UFWA merged with the International Union of Electronic, Electrical, Technical, Salaried and Machine Workers (IUE) to form the International Union of Electronic, Electrical, Technical, Salaried, Machine and Furniture Workers.

The IUE in turn later affiliated with the Communication Workers of America (CWA) as "IUE-CWA."

== Presidents ==
1937: Morris Muster
1946: Morris Pizer
1970: Fred Fulford
1974: Carl Scarborough

== See also ==
- Communication Workers of America
- International Union of Electrical Workers
