= Loretta C. Van Hook =

American missionary and educator

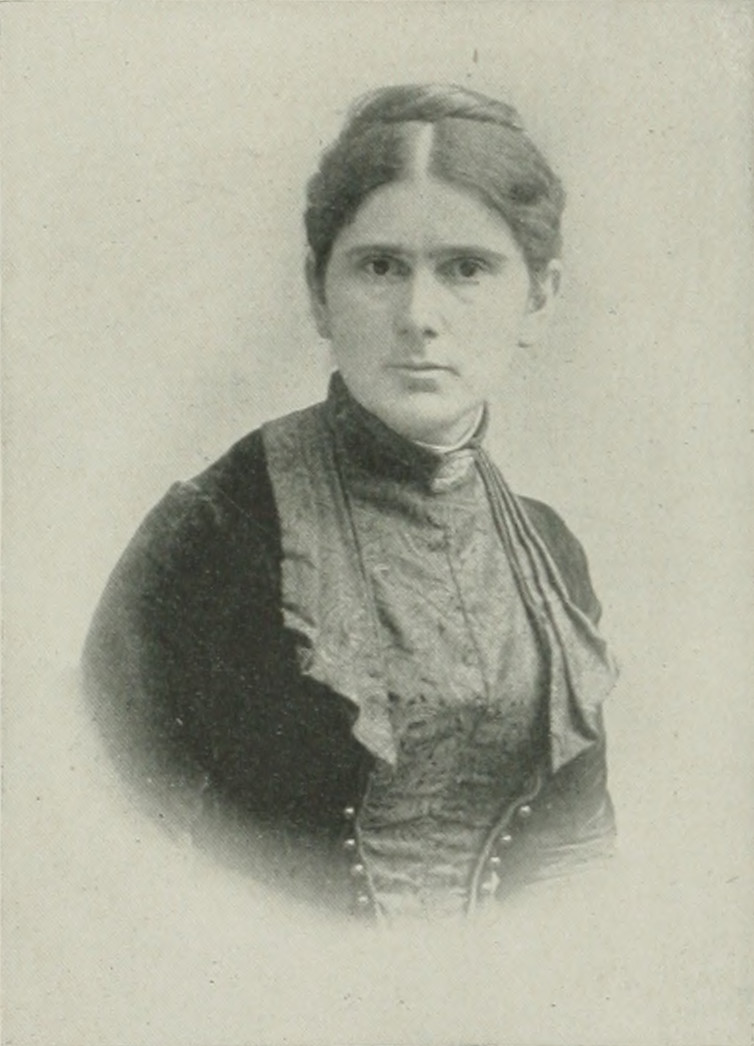
- "A Woman of the Century"

Personal life
- Born: Loretta C. Turner; July 4, 1852 Shopiere, Wisconsin
- Died: October 12, 1935 (aged 83) Newburgh, Indiana
- Resting place: Rose Hill Cemetery, Newburgh, Indiana
- Spouse: James Perry Van Hook (m. 1870; died 1871)
- Children: 1
- Education: Rockford College

Religious life
- Religion: Christianity
- Denomination: Presbyterian
- Profession: foreign missionary and educator

Senior posting
- Post: Tabriz, Persia

Loretta C. Van Hook (July 4, 1852 – October 12, 1935) was an American missionary and educator in Persia. Characterized as a quiet, sad-faced, delicate woman, Van Hook attended Rockford College of Rockford, Illinois when she was a widow, having lost her husband and only child in 1872. She began then to prepare for mission work and went to Tabriz, Persia, under the Presbyterian Board of Missions. She established there a boarding school for girls, modeled after Rockford. Van Hook did much evangelistic work in Persia and lectured extensively in the U.S. on return trips. She made five journeys to the U.S. from Persia, and on each trip visited different places of interest in Europe.

== Early life and education ==
Loretta C. Turner was born in Shopiere, Wisconsin, July 4, 1852. Her ancestors were New Englanders and Hollanders. Her father was a millwright, a native of New York, and her mother belonged to one of the old Dutch families of the same State. From her mother, Loretta inherited a fine artistic taste and talent. She was a precocious child, and she generally led her classes. She acquired a varied education. As a child she was deeply religious.

== Career ==
When fourteen years old, she became a teacher.

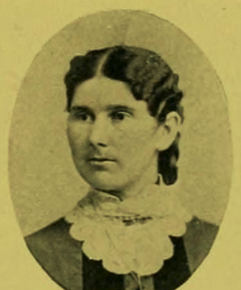
undated

She married James Perry Van Hook in 1870, and they moved to western Iowa. Her husband and her only child, Arthur Perry Van Hook, died in 1871.

Widowed, Van Hook consecrated her life to the service of others. She went to Rockford, Illinois to attend Rockford College, and took a course in the seminary there, graduating in 1875. She visited Rockford in 1876, 1883, 1896 and two or three other times.

In 1875, the Woman's Foreign Missionary Society of the First Presbyterian Church, Indianapolis, Indiana invited the Woman's Presbyterian Board of Missions of the Northwest to meet in Indianapolis, to be the especial guest of the First Church in 1876. During this meeting the society, having heard that Van Hook was a candidate for the mission field, decided to assume her support, which plan was approved by this assembly, and the connection existed for seven years.

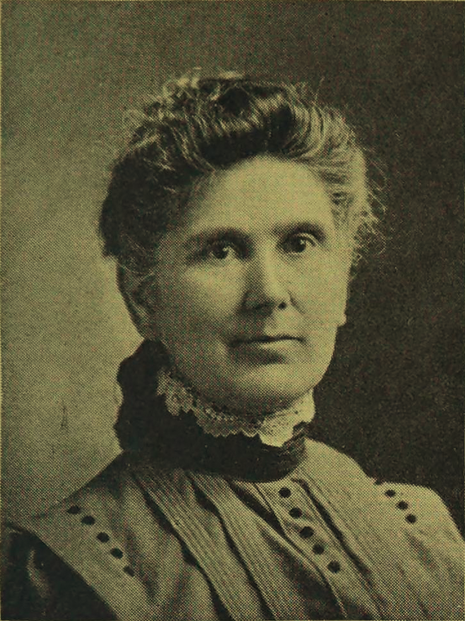
undated

Hailing from the Presbyterian Church of Marshalltown, Iowa, Van Hook sailed for Persia on September 9, 1876, along with Rev. Samuel L. Ward and his wife. They reached Tabriz in November of that year. During that and the two succeeding years, she spent her time in missionary work and in the acquisition of the language of the country, having in view the delivery of Persian women from the degradation in which they lived. She went out under the auspices of the Presbyterian Board of Missions. She settled in Tabriz, a city of 200,000 people, where women were taught to believe that they had no souls, and where no woman had ever been taught to read. After learning the language of the people, in 1879, Van Hook established a school for girls, modelled after Rockford College, in a quarter of the city where no other foreigner resided. Prejudices and suspicions met her, but she overcame them, and her school became a flourishing seminary, with large buildings in the heart of Tabriz. She had students from Erinam, Russia, Kars, Turkey, and Zanjan, Iran. Her graduates held influential positions from the Caspian Sea to the borders of Turkey and Kurdistan. She was assisted in her work by the bands of King's Daughters.

In 1882, she became a life member of the Woman's Presbyterian Board of Missions of the Northwest. She resigned from the foreign mission board in 1917.

== Death ==
Loretta C. Van Hook died October 12, 1935, in Newburgh, Indiana; burial was in that town's Rose Hill cemetery.

== Selected works ==
- "Image Worship during Muharram" (1891)
- "Memories of Pioneer Days" (1913)
