= Franklin Thomas Backus =

American lawyer and politician

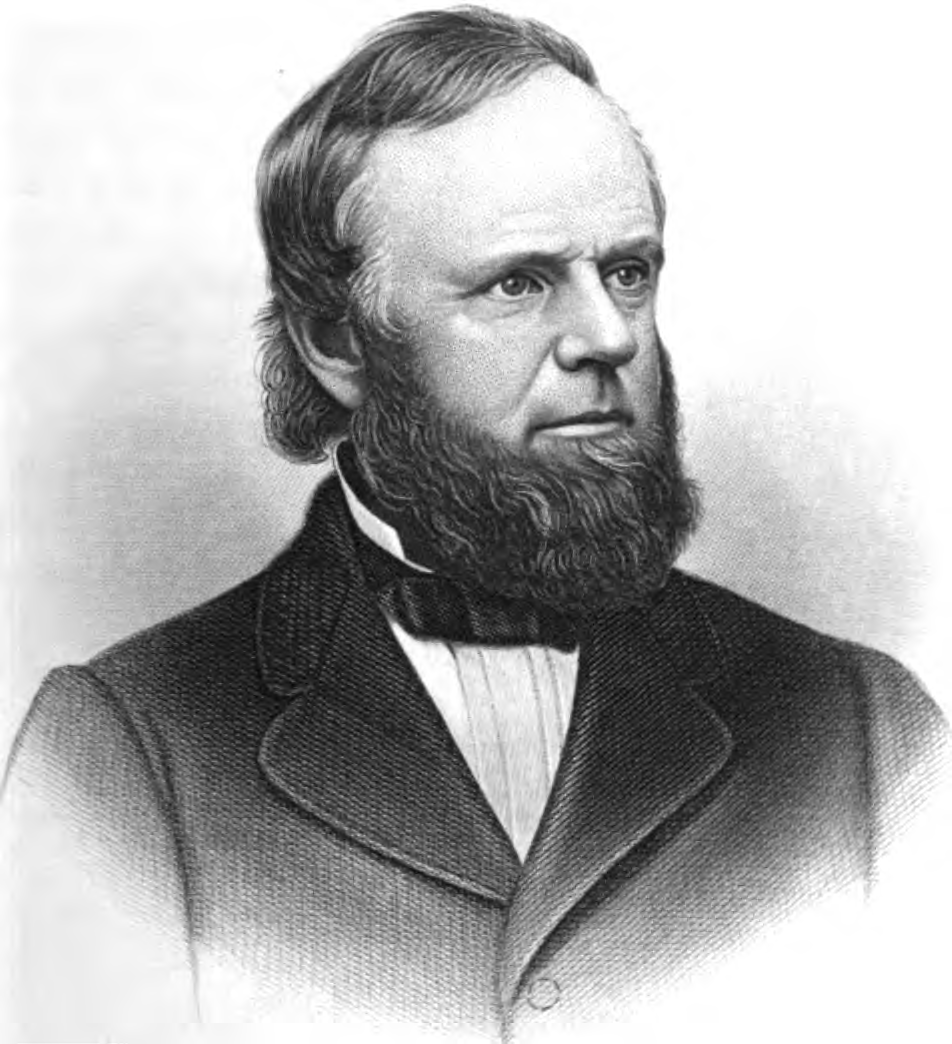

Member of the Ohio Senate from the Cuyahoga & Geauga Counties district
- In office December 6, 1847 – December 2, 1849
- Preceded by: Seabury Ford
- Succeeded by: Henry B. Payne

Member of the Ohio House of Representatives from the Cuyahoga County district
- In office December 7, 1846 – December 5, 1847 Serving with Theodore Breck
- Preceded by: David Harvey
- Succeeded by: Theodore Breck

Personal details
- Born: May 6, 1813 Lee, Massachusetts, U.S.
- Died: May 14, 1870 (aged 57) Cleveland, Ohio, U.S.
- Resting place: Lake View Cemetery
- Party: Whig
- Other political affiliations: Republican; Democratic
- Spouse: Lucy Mygatt (m. 1842)
- Education: Yale University
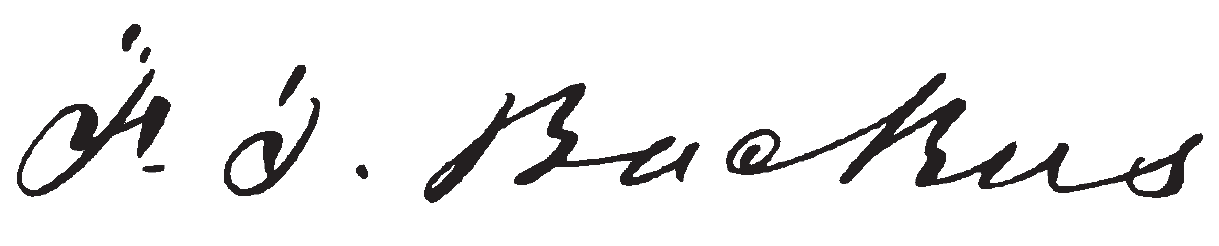
- Signature

Franklin Thomas Backus (May 6, 1813 – May 14, 1870) was an American lawyer and politician. He was a defense attorney in the Oberlin–Wellington Rescue case and the Case Western Reserve University School of Law was once named for him.

== Life ==
Backus was born in Lee, Massachusetts on May 6, 1813, the fourth son of Thomas and Rebecca Backus. While he was very young the family moved to Lansing, New York He prepared himself for college while assistant teacher in an academy in Delaware kept by an older brother, and entered Yale College as a Junior in 1834. On leaving college in 1836, he established a classical school in Cleveland, Ohio, and at the same time began the study of law. Several notable younger Clevelanders attended his school, including Leonard Case, Jr., William Case, George Hoadly, and Horace Kelley.

In 1839, he was admitted to the bar. In January 1842, he married Lucy Mygatt, who survived him.

In 1861, he was a member of the Peace Convention which met in Washington, with the hope of averting the American Civil War. The later years of his life were devoted to the duties of his profession, in which he had become eminent. His services were especially sought for by railroad corporations, and it is to the excessive and exhausting labor thus brought upon him that his death, from a disease of the heart, is to be attributed.

== Sources ==
- This article incorporates public domain material from the Yale Obituary Record.
- Wilson, J. G.; Fiske, J., eds. (1900). "Backus, Franklin Thomas" . Appletons' Cyclopædia of American Biography. New York: D. Appleton.
- Johnson, Rossiter, ed. (1906). "Backus, Franklin Thomas". The Biographical Dictionary of America. Vol. 1. Boston: American Biographical Society. p. 175.
