= Joel Rich =

19th century American politician

Member of the Wisconsin Senate from the 18th district
- In office January 6, 1862 – January 4, 1864
- Preceded by: Alden I. Bennett
- Succeeded by: William E. Smith

Personal details
- Born: February 24, 1824 Caroline, New York, U.S.
- Died: July 10, 1906 (aged 82) Juneau, Wisconsin, U.S.
- Resting place: Juneau Cemetery, Juneau, Wisconsin
- Party: Democratic
- Spouses: Esther M. Wright (m. 1846; died 1854); Helen Melissa Hart (m. 1856–1906)
- Children: with Esther Wright; Baby Boy^{(died 1854)}; Julia Evaline (Perry)^{(b. 1847; died 1931)}; Allen E. Rich; with Helen Hart; Joel Rich^{(b. 1857; died 1915)}; Eunice Annette (Binz)^{(b. 1862; died 1940)}; Bessie (Hemmy)^{(b. 1865; died 1950)}; Colden Aruna Rich^{(b. 1873; died 1936)}

Joel Rich (February 24, 1824 – July 10, 1906) was an American businessman, Democratic politician, and Wisconsin pioneer. He was one of the founders of Juneau, Wisconsin, and represented Dodge County in the Wisconsin State Senate for 1862 and 1863.

His name is incorrectly listed as "Joe Rich" in the annals of the legislature (1880s), and that error is propagated in other places.

== Biography ==
Joel Rich was born in Caroline, Tompkins County, New York, in 1824. He emigrated west to the Wisconsin Territory with his father in 1844 and settled on a 160-acre homestead near the center of Dodge County. He assisted his father in locating a site for a village near their homestead, and they platted the village site with other men in 1845. The village was initially named "Victory", and became the core of what is now the city of Juneau, Wisconsin. Shortly after platting the village, Rich assisted in constructing the first buildings, including a frame house which became the first general store in Juneau, operated by S. H. Coleman. He also worked to construct a dam at Horicon, and constructed the first building at that site.

Rich was principally involved in the lumber industry in Dodge County, floating logs down to Lake Horicon to be manufactured into lumber and sold to settlers for construction. Later in life, he became involved in other business ventures; in 1872 he was one of the founding directors of the Cheese Factory company.

Joel Rich was the second postmaster of Juneau, appointed in 1848 to succeed Charles Billinghurst. He also served four years on the town board between 1848 and 1860, and was a member of the school district board of trustees. He canvassed all over the county in a successful campaign to encourage the voters to endorse the location of Juneau as the county seat of Dodge County.

Rich was elected to the Wisconsin State Senate in 1861 and served a two-year term. When the state prison board was established in 1874, Rich was one of the inaugural members appointed by Governor William Robert Taylor. While serving on the board, he also served as acting deputy warden for the state prison.

In the 1880s, Rich was described as owning the finest home in Juneau. He died at his home on July 10, 1906.

== Personal life and family ==
Joel Rich was the eldest son of Martin Rich. Martin Rich had emigrated from Vermont to Tompkins County, New York, with his father—also named Joel Rich. The elder Joel Rich owned most of the land which became the city of Ithaca, New York.

Joel Rich married twice. He married first wife, Esther M. Wright, in 1846. They had three children together before her death in 1853, but one of their children died in infancy. Rich subsequently married Helen Melissa Hart in 1856 and had at least five more children. Rich was survived by his second wife and seven children.

Rich was active throughout most of his life with the Independent Order of Odd Fellows, and was president of the Dodge County lodge.

Wisconsin Senate
| Preceded by Alden I. Bennett | Member of the Wisconsin Senate from the 18th district January 6, 1862 – January 4, 1864 | Succeeded by William E. Smith |
