= Hermon Thorp =

American politician

Member of the Wisconsin Senate from the 8th district
- In office January 6, 1862 – January 4, 1864
- Preceded by: George Bennett
- Succeeded by: Anthony Van Wyck

Member of the Wisconsin State Assembly from the Racine 5th district
- In office January 1, 1849 – January 7, 1850
- Preceded by: Elias Woodworth Jr.
- Succeeded by: George M. Robinson

Personal details
- Born: January 19, 1809 Connecticut, U.S.
- Died: February 7, 1892 (aged 83) Kenosha, Wisconsin, U.S.
- Cause of death: Diabetes
- Resting place: Liberty Cemetery, Liberty Corners, Wisconsin
- Party: Republican; Free Soil (1848–1854); Democratic (before 1848)
- Spouse: Emeline Lacey (m. 1831; died 1887)
- Children: Frederick O. Thorp^{(b. c.1833; died c.1890)}; Mary A. (Farrar) (Bennett)^{(b. c.1835; died 1900)}; Edward Lacey Thorp^{(b. 1836; died 1902)}; Ellen F. (McCommons) (Gilmore)^{(b. 1839; died 1916)}; Emma (Culver)^{(b. 1841; died 1913)}

Hermon Stiles Thorp (January 19, 1809 – February 7, 1892) was an American farmer, politician, and Wisconsin pioneer. He was one of the earliest American settlers in what is now Kenosha County, Wisconsin. He represented Kenosha County for one term in the Wisconsin State Assembly (1849), and later for two years in the Wisconsin Senate (1862, 1863). Politically, he was originally a member of the Democratic Party, but served in the Assembly as a Free Soiler, then joined the Republican Party when that party was organized in the 1850s. Thorp's first name was often spelled "Herman", and his last name was sometimes spelled "Thorpe".

Thorp's eldest son, Frederick O. Thorp, also served in the Wisconsin Senate, and served in the Senate during same terms as Hermon; this is the only known case of a father and son serving together in the same chamber of the Wisconsin Legislature at the same time.

== Background ==
Thorp was born in Connecticut in 1809, and moved to Wisconsin in 1839, settling at Bristol.

On September 3, 1844, he served as a delegate from Bristol to the Racine County Democratic Party Convention.

== Assembly service ==
He served one term in the Assembly (the Second [1849] Session of the State Legislature, which convened on January 10, 1849, and adjourned April 2, 1849) from southern Racine County (the towns of Brighton, Bristol, Paris, Salem and Wheatland) as a Free Soiler, succeeding Democrat Elias Woodworth, Jr. At that time Thorp was living in or near Bristol. He was succeeded in the 1850 session by fellow Free Soiler George M. Robinson.

== Return to private life ==
At the October 10, 1851, Kenosha County (Kenosha County was by that time no longer the southern portion of Racine County) Democratic convention, Thorp was nominated for the Wisconsin State Senate. A large portion of the delegates (12 of 29) would later withdraw from the convention over issues of platform and nominations. It is unclear from the sources what the senate district was, and whether he ended up running for the office in the wake of the party split.

In 1853, Thorp was a prominent leader among those Kenosha County residents opposing any effort to lend the county's credit to raise money for railroad purposes. In August 1853, he signed the call for a special non-partisan "Anti-Railroad Convention" to nominate a candidate for state senate who would "represent the farmers and producing classes generally" by opposing the subsidy.

== Senate service ==
In 1861, he was elected to the Senate as a Republican from the 8th (Kenosha County) District, and was listed as living in or near Cypress (which was actually an unincorporated village within the Town of Bristol); Republican incumbent George Bennett was apparently not a candidate for re-election. He won by an eighteen-vote majority over former Democratic state senator Orson S. Head, a victory which Head challenged on the grounds that in the Town of Bristol, ballots which merely read "Thorp" (or "Throp") were counted. The Senate's committee investigating the matter found that there was no other candidate named Thorp running and that ballots merely reading "Head" were counted for Head; and ruled Thorp the victor. According to his official biography, he was a farmer. He was assigned to the standing committees on town and county organization; and on internal improvements: he served as chairman of the latter.

For the 1863 session (at which time he was once again listed as living near Bristol) he was assigned to the standing committees on roads, bridges and ferries; on contingent expenses and on the state prison, chairing the latter two committees; and to the joint committee on claims. He did not run for re-election in 1863, and was succeeded by Anthony Van Wyck of the Republican/National Union Party.

== After the legislature ==
Thorp remained active as a Republican. He was a delegate from Kenosha County to the party's 1880 First Congressional District convention; he was elected to the resolutions committee of the convention, and to serve on the district party's executive committee for the coming year.

Thorp eventually moved from Bristol (where he had settled in 1839) to Salem in the same county, and then to Kenosha. He was married to Emeline L. Thorp (maiden name unknown), who died May 21, 1887, at the age of 71. He died February 7, 1892; they are buried in the Town of Salem in the Liberty Corners Cemetery (latitude 42° 31' 04.1" N; longitude 88° 05' 53.3" W).

Wisconsin State Assembly
Preceded by Elias Woodworth Jr.	Member of the Wisconsin State Assembly from the Racine 5th district January 1, 1849 – January 7, 1850	Succeeded by George M. Robinson
Wisconsin Senate
Preceded by George Bennett	Member of the Wisconsin Senate from the 8th district January 6, 1862 – January 4, 1864	Succeeded by Anthony Van Wyck
