= Upholsterers International Union of North America =

Former trade union of the United States

The Upholsterers International Union of North America (called the UIU or UIUNA) was a North American labor union of upholsterers. It was founded in 1882 when eight small met at a conference in Chicago and agreed to combine. It affiliated with the American Federation of Labor in 1900. In 1929, a convention voted to change the name to Upholsterers, Carpet and Linoleum Mechanics' International Union of North America but the other name remained in common use. Their official organ was the Upholsters' Journal; as of 1936, it was estimated that they had 11,500 members.

By 1977, the union (headquartered in Philadelphia) had a membership of 55,000, and was pursuing a policy of aggressively organizing in the Southern United States (where most furniture jobs had gone), in cooperation with other unions such as the United Furniture Workers of America and the International Woodworkers of America. In October 1985, the union voted to merge with the United Steelworkers.

== Presidents ==
1892: Anton J. Engel
1907: James H. Hatch
1921: William Kohn
1931: James H. Hatch
1937: Sal B. Hoffman
