= Elias Woodworth Jr. =

American politician (1819–1882)

Member of the Wisconsin State Assembly from the Racine 5th district
- In office June 5, 1848 – January 1, 1849
- Preceded by: Position established
- Succeeded by: Herman Thorp

Personal details
- Born: May 13, 1819
- Died: June 17, 1882
- Party: Democratic
- Spouse: Helen M. Van Wie (m. 1848)
- Children: Jane Diadamia (Carpenter)^{(b. 1849)}; Frank Day Woodworth^{(b. 1854)}; Lydia Christian (Fowler)^{(b. 1857)}; Frederick E. Woodworth^{(b. 1861)}; Helen E. Woodworth^{(b. 1862)}; Esther Woodworth^{(b. 1863)}; William E. Woodworth^{(b. 1866)}

Elias Woodworth, Jr., (born May 13, 1819; died June 17, 1882) was a member of the Wisconsin State Assembly during the first session (1848). He was a Democrat.

Woodworth's father, also named Elias Woodworth, was born in Cayuga County, New York, and was a pioneer settler of Salem, Wisconsin. The Woodworths are direct descendants of Walter Woodworth, one of the original Plymouth Colony settlers.

Elias, Jr., married Helen Van Wie and had at least seven children. Sometime after his term in the Assembly, he and his family relocated to Medford, Minnesota.
