= George M. Robinson =

American politician

Member of the Wisconsin State Assembly from the Racine 5th district
- In office January 7, 1850 – January 6, 1851
- Preceded by: Herman Thorp
- Succeeded by: Obed Hale (Kenosha 2nd)

Personal details
- Party: Free Soil

George M. Robinson was an American from Salem, Wisconsin, who served a single one-year term in 1850 as a Free Soil Party member of the Wisconsin State Assembly from southern Racine County, succeeding fellow Free Soiler Herman Thorp.

In 1850, Kenosha County was created from the southern half of Racine County. Robinson's Assembly district, previously covering southwest Racine County, was now the western Assembly district of Kenosha County. At Kenosha county's first elections in April 1850, Robinson was elected the first County Treasurer. He was ultimately succeeded in the Assembly by Obed Hale, another Free Soiler.

Wisconsin State Assembly
Preceded by Herman Thorp	Member of the Wisconsin State Assembly from the Racine 5th district January 7, 1850 – January 6, 1851	Succeeded by Obed Hale (Kenosha 2nd district)
