= Benjamin Ferguson (Wisconsin politician) =

19th century American Democratic politician, Member of the Wisconsin Senate

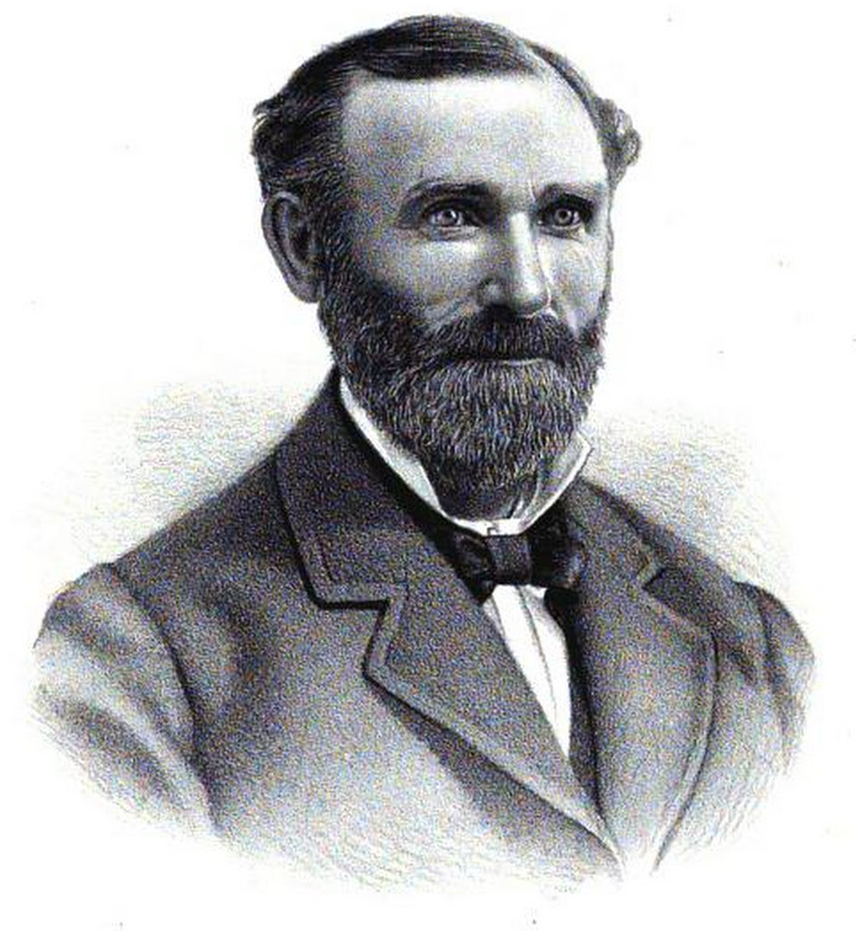

Member of the Wisconsin Senate from the 22nd district
- In office January 6, 1860 – January 19, 1862
- Preceded by: William E. Smith
- Succeeded by: Thomas R. Hudd

Chairman of the Dodge County Board of Supervisors
- In office April 1878 – April 1880
- Preceded by: J. S. Clark

Fox Lake Village President
- In office April 1878 – April 1879
- Preceded by: William J. Dexter
- Succeeded by: J. H. Williams
- In office April 1876 – April 1877
- Preceded by: Seymour T. Coman
- Succeeded by: William J. Dexter
- In office April 1861 – April 1863
- Preceded by: John W. Davis
- Succeeded by: Stoddard Judd
- In office April 1859 – April 1860
- Preceded by: Abel Merwin
- Succeeded by: John W. Davis

Personal details
- Born: February 14, 1820 Penobscot, Maine
- Died: April 19, 1888 (aged 68)
- Resting place: Riverside Memorial Park; Fox Lake, Wisconsin
- Party: Democratic
- Spouse: Phoebe Ann Ferguson (m. 1848; died 1884)
- Children: Charles A. Ferguson^{(b. 1849; died 1927)} Henry Ferguson^{(b. 1851; died 1851)} James Ferguson^{(b. 1853; died 1853)} Jenny Ferguson^{(b. 1856; died 1856)}
- Parent: William Ferguson (father)
- Profession: Farmer, politician
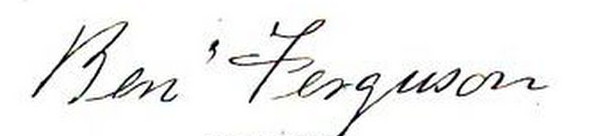
- Signature

Benjamin Ferguson (February 14, 1820 – April 19, 1888) was a Scottish American politician and farmer. He was one of the first settlers of Fox Lake, Wisconsin, and served a single two-year term (1860–61) representing Dodge County in the Wisconsin State Senate.

== Biography ==
Born in Penobscot, Maine, he was descended from the Clan Fergusson, through his Scottish immigrant father, William Ferguson. Benjamin Ferguson moved to the Wisconsin Territory in 1844 and became one of the first settlers at Fox Lake, building the first frame house in the village. He established a farm on much of the land that later became the village of Fox Lake, and engaged in farming for most of the rest of his life.

Ferguson's first attempt at public office was in 1847, when he was nominated for Sheriff of Dodge County. He lost that election, but was elected on his second attempt, serving from 1852 to 1854.

In 1857, he was the Democratic candidate for Wisconsin State Senate in the 22nd District, but was defeated by Republican future-Governor William E. Smith. In January 1858, Ferguson became Postmaster of Dodge County, and held that office until November 1859.

On May 4, 1858, Fox Lake officially incorporated as a village. In April 1859, Ferguson was elected the second Village President, defeating William E. Smith in that election. Later that year, he again challenged Smith over his seat in the Wisconsin State Senate. This time Ferguson prevailed, and served as Dodge County's representative in the Senate for the 1860 and 1861 sessions.

In April 1861, Ferguson was again elected Village President. He was elected again in 1862, 1876, and 1878. He also served as Fox Lake's representative on the Dodge County Board of Supervisors for 1861, 1870, 1871, and 1872, and was Chairman of the County Board in 1878 and 1879.

In the 1861 election, Ferguson was the Democratic Party's nominee for Governor of Wisconsin. He was defeated by Republican Louis P. Harvey.

== Family and personal life ==
In 1848, Benjamin Ferguson married Phoebe Ann Green, the widow of David Green. Mr. and Mrs. Ferguson had four children, but only one survived infancy. Mrs. Ferguson had three children from her previous marriage.

== Electoral history ==
Wisconsin Gubernatorial Election, 1861
Party	Candidate	Votes	%	±%
General Election, November 5, 1861
Republican	Louis P. Harvey	53,777	54.19%	+0.88%
Democratic	Benjamin Ferguson	45,456	45.81%	
Total votes		'99,233'	'100.0%'	-11.82%
Republican hold				

Party political offices
Preceded by Harrison Carroll Hobart	Democratic nominee for Governor of Wisconsin; 1861	Succeeded by Henry L. Palmer
