= 1861 Wisconsin gubernatorial election =

- November 5, 1861
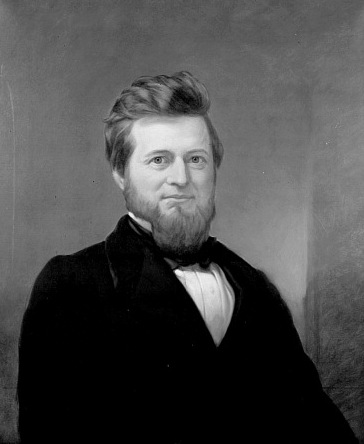

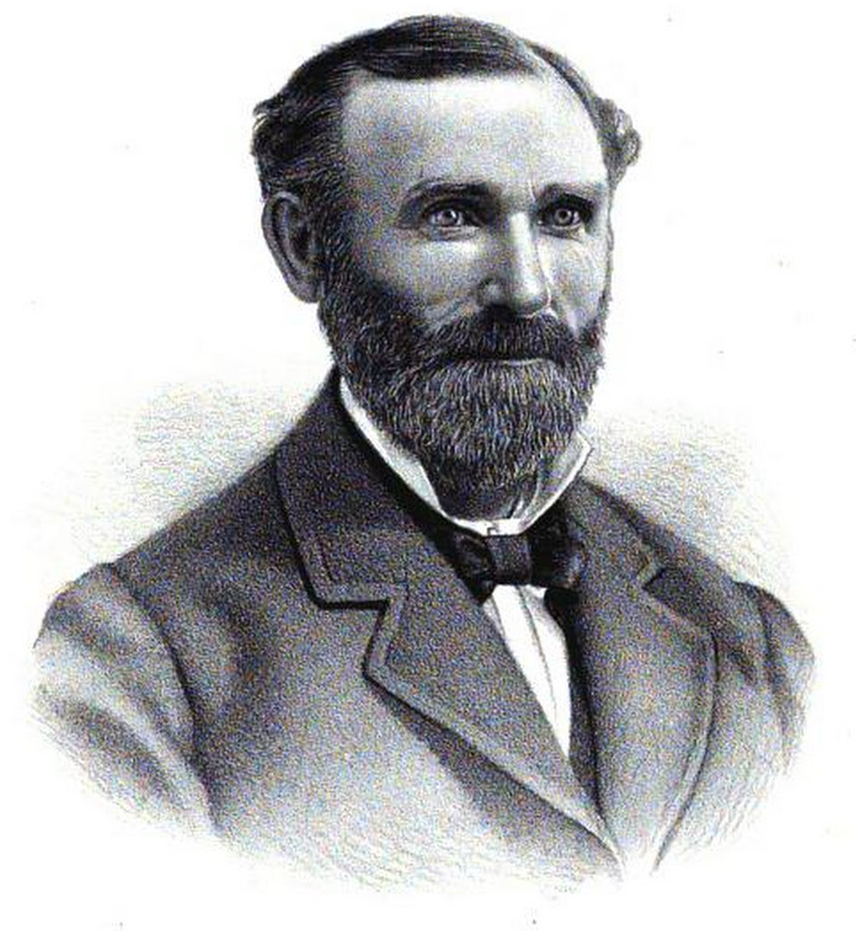
Nominee	Louis P. Harvey	Benjamin Ferguson
Party	National Union	Democratic
Popular vote	53,777	45,456
Percentage	54.18%	45.80%
- County results Harvey : 50–60% 60–70% 70–80% 80–90% >90% Ferguson: 50–60% 60–70% 70–80% 80–90%
Governor before election
Alexander W. Randall
Republican
Elected Governor
Louis P. Harvey
Republican

The 1861 Wisconsin gubernatorial election was held on November 5, 1861. Republican Party candidate Louis P. Harvey won the election with 54% of the vote, defeating Democratic candidate Benjamin Ferguson.

This was the first Wisconsin gubernatorial election to take place after the outbreak of the American Civil War, and Wisconsin Republicans joined War Democrats to form the Union Party during the war. Democrats accused them of using patriotism to paper over the state's economic troubles.

Harvey won Calumet County and Kewaunee County; these counties would not vote for a Republican again until 1916 and 1896, respectively.

== Background ==
Wisconsin was experiencing economic depression, the results of the Panic of 1857. The secession of the southern states was further damage to the economy, exacerbating problems in the state's banks, which had invested a great deal of capital in southern bonds. The bonds were essentially worthless after secession, and thirty eight banks had failed by June 1861, with another forty on the brink. Riots broke out over invalidated bank notes and soldiers had to be called in to restore order.

The farm economy was also depressed, as prices for agricultural products fell due to the Confederate blockade on the Mississippi River. Railroad companies took advantage of their new monopoly on transportation and raised their freight prices. The combination of low incomes and higher expenses pushed many farms toward foreclosure.

All of these problems weighed heavily on the government, and the Republicans, who held power in the state at the time, took much of the blame for bringing depression and war. It was in this environment that incumbent Republican Governor Alexander Randall chose not to seek re-election to a third term.

== Nominations ==
=== Union party ===
Louis P. Harvey was the incumbent Wisconsin Secretary of State at the time of the 1861 election, having been elected in the 1859 election. He had previously served two terms in the Wisconsin State Senate, representing Rock County. Harvey was a former Whig who had participated in the founding and organization of the Republican Party of Wisconsin.

=== Democratic party ===
Benjamin Ferguson was a member of the Wisconsin State Senate at the time of the election, representing Dodge County. Ferguson was a farmer and had previously been elected Sheriff of Dodge County and served on the County Board of Supervisors.

== Results ==
1861 Wisconsin gubernatorial election
Party	Candidate	Votes	%	±%
National Union	Louis P. Harvey	53,777	54.18%	+0.97%
Democratic	Benjamin Ferguson	45,456	45.80%	−0.80%
	Scattering	25	0.03%	
Majority		8,321	8.38%	
Total votes		99,258	100.00%	
National Union hold		Swing	+1.77%	

=== Results by county ===
County	Louis P. Harvey National Union		Benjamin Ferguson Democratic		Scattering Write-in		Margin		Total votes cast
County	#	%	#	%	#	%	#	%	Total votes cast
Adams	678	79.95%	170	20.05%	0	0.00%	508	59.91%	848
Ashland	29	43.28%	38	56.72%	0	0.00%	-9	-13.43%	67
Bad Ax	966	77.09%	287	22.91%	0	0.00%	679	54.19%	1,253
Brown	601	45.12%	731	54.88%	0	0.00%	-130	-9.76%	1,332
Buffalo	567	70.61%	236	29.39%	0	0.00%	331	41.22%	803
Calumet	394	54.72%	326	45.28%	0	0.00%	68	9.44%	720
Chippewa	155	44.80%	191	55.20%	0	0.00%	-36	-10.40%	346
Clark	175	87.06%	26	12.94%	0	0.00%	149	74.13%	201
Columbia	1,925	72.18%	741	27.78%	1	0.04%	1,184	44.39%	2,667
Crawford	582	46.41%	672	53.59%	0	0.00%	-90	-7.18%	1,254
Dane	3,113	53.76%	2,675	46.19%	3	0.05%	438	7.56%	5,791
Dodge	2,645	40.11%	3,950	59.89%	0	0.00%	-1,305	-19.79%	6,595
Door	196	77.47%	56	22.13%	1	0.40%	140	55.34%	253
Douglas	51	55.43%	41	44.57%	0	0.00%	10	10.87%	92
Dunn	490	98.59%	7	1.41%	0	0.00%	483	97.18%	497
Eau Claire	404	67.56%	194	32.44%	0	0.00%	210	35.12%	598
Fond du Lac	2,440	51.53%	2,295	48.47%	0	0.00%	145	3.06%	4,735
Grant	2,009	65.76%	1,046	34.24%	0	0.00%	963	31.52%	3,055
Green	1,461	68.85%	661	31.15%	0	0.00%	800	37.70%	2,122
Green Lake	811	65.35%	428	34.49%	2	0.16%	383	30.86%	1,241
Iowa	988	55.01%	808	44.99%	0	0.00%	180	10.02%	1,796
Jackson	605	85.94%	99	14.06%	0	0.00%	506	71.88%	704
Jefferson	1,838	46.94%	2,076	53.01%	2	0.05%	-238	-6.08%	3,916
Juneau	669	51.03%	640	48.82%	2	0.15%	29	2.21%	1,311
Kenosha	1,054	68.26%	490	31.74%	0	0.00%	564	36.53%	1,544
Kewaunee	307	60.08%	204	39.92%	0	0.00%	103	20.16%	511
La Crosse	1,166	60.01%	777	39.99%	0	0.00%	389	20.02%	1,943
La Pointe	57	100.00%	0	0.00%	0	0.00%	57	100.00%	57
Lafayette	1,464	44.16%	1,851	55.84%	0	0.00%	-387	-11.67%	3,315
Manitowoc	1,103	44.75%	1,361	55.21%	1	0.04%	-258	-10.47%	2,465
Marathon	100	19.88%	403	80.12%	0	0.00%	-303	-60.24%	503
Marquette	515	45.25%	623	54.75%	0	0.00%	-108	-9.49%	1,138
Milwaukee	1,840	25.52%	5,370	74.48%	0	0.00%	-3,530	-48.96%	7,210
Monroe	931	69.22%	414	30.78%	0	0.00%	517	38.44%	1,345
Oconto	542	93.93%	33	5.72%	2	0.35%	509	88.21%	577
Outagamie	449	33.66%	884	66.27%	1	0.07%	-435	-32.61%	1,334
Ozaukee	345	19.60%	1,415	80.40%	0	0.00%	-1,070	-60.80%	1,760
Pepin	467	77.32%	137	22.68%	0	0.00%	330	54.64%	604
Pierce	756	90.87%	76	9.13%	0	0.00%	680	81.73%	832
Polk	257	95.90%	11	4.10%	0	0.00%	246	91.79%	268
Portage	619	69.24%	275	30.76%	0	0.00%	344	38.48%	894
Racine	1,582	55.05%	1,292	44.95%	0	0.00%	290	10.09%	2,874
Richland	714	58.10%	515	41.90%	0	0.00%	199	16.19%	1,229
Rock	2,796	74.20%	969	25.72%	3	0.08%	1,827	48.49%	3,768
Sauk	1,627	73.79%	578 (Note: The 1862 Legislative Manual gives this figure as 579 but this is a mistake.)	26.21%	0	0.00%	1,049	47.57%	2,205
Shawano	125	60.68%	81	39.32%	0	0.00%	44	21.36%	206
Sheboygan	1,258	50.71%	1,223	49.29%	0	0.00%	35	1.41%	2,481
St. Croix	635	66.15%	325	33.85%	0	0.00%	310	32.29%	960
Trempealeau	469	94.94%	25	5.06%	0	0.00%	444	89.88%	494
Walworth	2,133	65.27%	1,135	34.73%	0	0.00%	998	30.54%	3,268
Washington	383	15.13%	2,146	84.79%	2	0.08%	-1,763	-69.66%	2,531
Waukesha	1,950	46.84%	2,212	53.13%	1	0.02%	-262	-6.29%	4,163
Waupaca	1,071	69.32%	471	30.49%	3	0.19%	600	38.83%	1,545
Waushara	996	84.05%	189	15.95%	0	0.00%	807	68.10%	1,185
Winnebago	2,071	60.63%	1,345	39.37%	0	0.00%	726	21.25%	3,416
Wood	203	46.67%	232	53.33%	0	0.00%	-29	-6.67%	435
Total	53,777	54.18%	45,456	45.80%	25 (Note: The county figures add up to 24)	0.03%	8,321	8.38%	99,258

==== Counties that flipped from Democratic to National Union ====
- Buffalo
- Calumet
- Dane
- Door
- Douglas
- Kewaunee
- La Pointe
- Oconto
- Sheboygan
- St. Croix

==== Counties that flipped from Republican to Democratic ====
- Waukesha
