= Michael Hanrahan =

American politician

Michael Hanrahan was an American politician.

From the town of Granville, Wisconsin, Hanrahan lived in the community of Good Hope, Wisconsin. He served in the Wisconsin State Assembly, in 1858, as a Democrat.
