= George E. Mahoney =

American politician (1867–1955)

George E. Mahoney (April 30, 1867 – March 12, 1955) was a member of the Wisconsin State Assembly.

Before serving in the assembly, Mahoney had previously been a justice of the peace and a member of the Kenosha County, Wisconsin School Board. Mahoney was born on April 30, 1867, in Pleasant Prairie, Wisconsin. He was a Democrat. He died on March 12, 1955, and is buried in Kenosha, Wisconsin.
