= Joseph Lourigan =

American politician and auto worker

Joseph Lourigan (March 19, 1901 – December 30, 1973) was an American politician and auto worker.

Born in Kenosha, Wisconsin, Lourigan went to the Kenosha public schools and Kenosha Business College. He worked at Kenosha American Motors and was involved in the labor union. He served in the Kenosha Common Council 1947, 1949, and 1954. He served in the Wisconsin State Assembly (1951-1957) as a Democrat and in the Wisconsin State Senate (1965-1973). He died in Kenosha, Wisconsin.
