= Shopiere, Wisconsin =

Census-designated place in Wisconsin, United States

- Unincorporated community and census-designated place
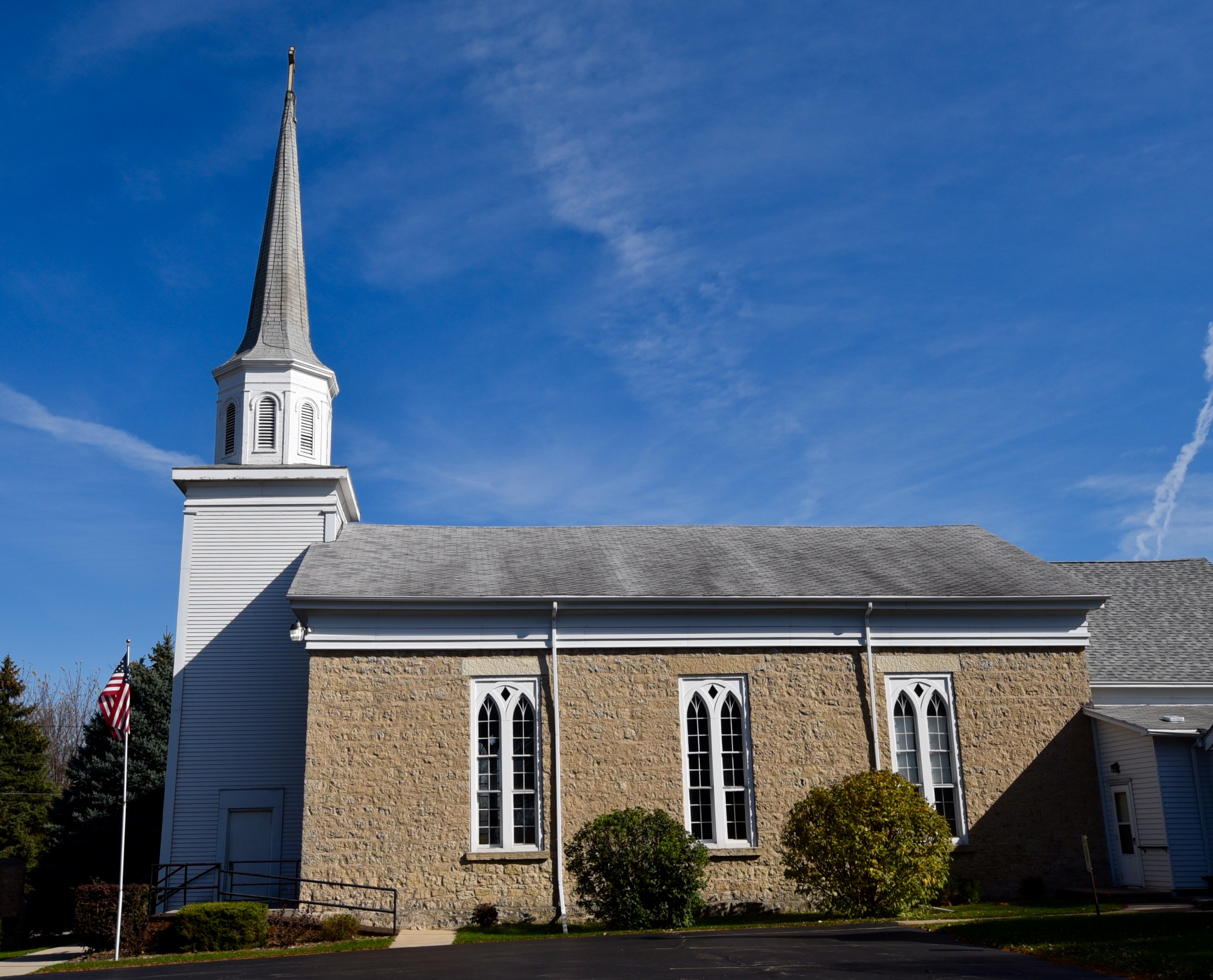
- Shopiere Congregational Church

- Location within Wisconsin Location within the United States
- Coordinates: 42°34′20″N 88°56′24″W
- Country: United States
- State: Wisconsin
- County: Rock

Area
  - Total: 0.22 sq mi (0.56 km^{2})
- Elevation: 823 ft (251 m)

Population (2020)
  - Total: 154
- Time zone: UTC-6 (Central (CST))
  - Summer (DST): UTC-5 (CDT)
- Area code: 608
- GNIS feature ID: 1574070

Shopiere is an unincorporated community and census-designated place in the Town of Turtle, in Rock County, Wisconsin, United States. It was first named a CDP at the 2020 census, which showed a population of 154.

== History ==
The community was originally named Waterloo. The first settlement was made in the 1830s by a colony from Connecticut. The present name is derived from chaux pierre, French for limestone, which is abundant in the area.

== Demographics ==
Historical population
Census	Pop.	Note	%±
2020	154		—
U.S. Decennial Census

== Notable people ==
- The community was the last home of Louis P. Harvey, the short-lived governor of Wisconsin, who drowned bringing medical supplies to wounded troops near the Civil War Battle of Shiloh in 1862.
- Loretta C. Van Hook (1852-1935), missionary and educator
