= Alden I. Bennett =

19th century American physician and politician

President pro tempore of the Wisconsin Senate
- In office January 9, 1861 – January 6, 1862
- Preceded by: Moses M. Davis
- Succeeded by: Frederick Thorpe

Member of the Wisconsin Senate from the 18th district
- In office January 4, 1858 – January 6, 1862
- Preceded by: Louis P. Harvey
- Succeeded by: Joel Rich

Personal details
- Born: August 23, 1807 Quaker Hill, New York, U.S.
- Died: June 17, 1862 (aged 54) Turtle, Wisconsin, U.S.
- Cause of death: Typhoid fever
- Resting place: Oakwood Cemetery, Beloit, Wisconsin
- Party: Republican; Whig (before 1854)
- Spouse: Mary Ann Espy (m. 1829–1862)
- Children: Ruth Ann Bennett^{(b. 1834; died 1899)}; Phineas Alden Bennett^{(b. 1837; died 1912)}; Mary Bennett^{(b. 1840; died 1916)}; Thomas Bennett^{(b. 1843)}; Charles John Bennett^{(b. 1845; died 1854)}; Alfred Bennett^{(b. 1849; died 1888)}; Augusta Bennett^{(b. 1849)}
- Profession: Physician

Alden Isaac Bennett (August 23, 1807 – June 17, 1862) was an American medical doctor, Republican politician, and Wisconsin pioneer. He was a member of the Wisconsin Senate, representing eastern Rock County from 1858 through 1862. His name was often abbreviated as A. I. Bennett.

== Biography ==
Alden I. Bennett was born at Quaker Hill, New York, on August 23, 1807. He was raised and educated in New York, and studied medicine with Gaius Halsey in Kortright, New York. He moved to Nanticoke, Pennsylvania, in 1825, where he was the first resident medical doctor in that settlement. In 1831, he moved to Bolivar, Ohio, and resided there for the next 20 years.

In Ohio, Bennett was active in politics with the Whig Party. He served as a Whig delegate to the Ohio constitutional convention of 1851 and subsequently advocated for the ratification of that constitution.

Bennett moved west to Wisconsin in 1853, settling in the town of Turtle, Wisconsin, just outside of Beloit. He quickly became involved in politics in the new state, first with the Whig Party and then with its successor, the Republican Party. He was chosen as president of the first Republican convention at the Beloit district.

In 1857, he was the Republican nominee for Wisconsin Senate in the 18th State Senate district, which then comprised Beloit and the eastern half of Rock County. He prevailed in the general election and served in the 1858 and 1859 legislative sessions. In 1859, he was renominated in a contested convention and went on to defeat Democrat Daniel Ruggles Spooner in the general election, earning another two years in the Senate.

During his years in the Senate, he was also appointed a trustee of the State Hospital for the Insane. In 1861, Bennett was discussed as a potential candidate for Governor of Wisconsin, but he ultimately did not seek the office. He left the Senate in January 1862.

== Personal life and family ==
Alden Bennett was the fifth of eight children born to Isaac Bennett and his wife Anna (née Losee) Bennett.

Bennett married Mary Ann Espy, of York County, Pennsylvania, in 1829. They had at least seven children. Two of their sons, Phineas and Thomas, served as officers in the Union Army during the American Civil War. Thomas served as a chief clerk and quartermaster on the staff of General William Tecumseh Sherman.

Phineas Bennett served only a few months, because he was wounded at the Battle of Shiloh shortly after his regiment was mustered. After hearing of the battle, Alden Bennett went to the Shiloh battlefield, along with Governor Louis P. Harvey and his delegation. He found his son in a crippled condition and brought him home to recover. In addition to his wounds, he contracted Typhoid fever and was not expected to survive. Alden remained with his son, treating him to recovery, but ultimately sacrificed his own health. He contracted Typhoid fever and died at his home in Turtle on June 17, 1862.

== Electoral history ==
=== Wisconsin Senate (1857, 1859) ===
Wisconsin Senate, 18th District Election, 1859
Party	Candidate	Votes	%	±%
General Election, November 8, 1859
Republican	Alden I. Bennett (incumbent)	1,767	72.84%	
Democratic	D. R. Spooner	659	27.16%	
Plurality		1,108	45.67%	
Total votes		2,426	100.0%	
Republican hold				

Wisconsin Senate
Preceded by Louis P. Harvey	Member of the Wisconsin Senate from the 18th district January 4, 1858 – January 6, 1862	Succeeded by Joel Rich
Preceded by Moses M. Davis	President pro tempore of the Wisconsin Senate; January 9, 1861 – January 6, 1862	Succeeded by Frederick Thorpe
