= Good Hope, Wisconsin =

Coordinates: 43°08′54″N 87°56′17″W

Good Hope was an inhabited place in the Town of Milwaukee in Milwaukee County, Wisconsin, United States.

== History ==
The original center was at Charles Krocker's "Good Hope Inn", a tavern and stagecoach stop, and the post office there, which opened in mid-1849, at what is now the intersection of Green Bay Avenue and Green Tree Road in Glendale. In later years, the post office itself was moved further north, to Green Bay Road's intersection with what would become known as Good Hope Road. The original structure was not demolished until 1931.

As of 1887, the Wisconsin Central Railway had a railroad station there, 12 miles out from Milwaukee on the way to Brown Deer and eventually to Ashland.

There was still a post office there as late as 1893, but it was shuttered sometime after May 12, 1894. The former Good Hope School District was merged into the Glendale-River Hills School District, but there is still a Good Hope School building west of Green Bay Road.

== Notable people ==
- Michael Hanrahan, Democratic member of the Wisconsin State Assembly from Milwaukee County in 1858
- John Hanrahan, Democratic member of the Assembly from Milwaukee County in 1861 and 1863
- John J. Kempf, Republican member of the Wisconsin State Senate from 1889 to 1892, was born in the town of Granville, near Good Hope.
- Richard F. Stapleton, Democratic member of the Assembly from Milwaukee County in 1877
- Amos Thomas, Republican member of the Assembly from Milwaukee County in 1889-1890
