= Louis P. Harvey =

American politician (1820–1862)

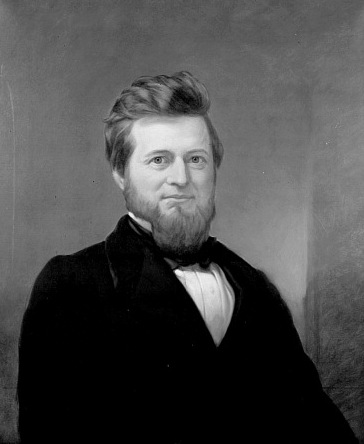

7th Governor of Wisconsin
- In office January 6, 1862 – April 19, 1862
- Lieutenant: Edward Salomon
- Preceded by: Alexander W. Randall
- Succeeded by: Edward Salomon

6th Secretary of State of Wisconsin
- In office January 2, 1860 – January 6, 1862
- Governor: Alexander W. Randall
- Preceded by: David W. Jones
- Succeeded by: James T. Lewis

President pro tempore of the Wisconsin Senate
- In office January 9, 1856 – January 14, 1857
- Preceded by: Eleazer Wakeley
- Succeeded by: Vacant (1857); Hiram H. Giles (1858)

Member of the Wisconsin Senate from the 18th district
- In office January 2, 1854 – January 4, 1858
- Preceded by: John R. Briggs Jr.
- Succeeded by: Alden I. Bennett

Personal details
- Born: Louis Powell Harvey; July 22, 1820 East Haddam, Connecticut, U.S.
- Died: April 19, 1862 (aged 41) Savannah, Tennessee, U.S.
- Resting place: Forest Hill Cemetery; Madison, Wisconsin
- Party: Republican; Whig (before 1854)
- Spouse: Cordelia A. Perrine (m. 1849–1862)
- Children: Mary Harvey; (b. 1849; died 1852)
- Parents: David Harvey (father); Almira (Powell) Harvey (mother)

Louis Powell Harvey (July 22, 1820 – April 19, 1862) was an American educator, Republican politician, and Wisconsin pioneer. He was the 7th governor of Wisconsin, but died just three months into his gubernatorial term; he fell off a pier and drowned in the Tennessee River on his way back from a trip to visit with Wisconsin troops after the bloody Battle of Shiloh, during the American Civil War. He was the first Wisconsin governor to die in office.

Before being elected governor, he served as Wisconsin's 6th secretary of state (1860–1862), and served four years in the Wisconsin Senate, representing eastern Rock County (1854–1858). Before Wisconsin achieved statehood, Harvey also served as a delegate to the constitutional convention of the winter of 1847–1848, which drafted the Constitution of Wisconsin.

== Early life ==
Harvey was born in East Haddam, Connecticut, in 1820, and moved west with his family to Strongsville, Ohio in 1828. His family was not wealthy, and Harvey had to support himself through school. He attended Western Reserve College for two years, but had to leave school before graduation due to poor health.

He went to Nicholasville, Kentucky, and taught school there for a time, then worked as a tutor at Woodward College for two years, in Cincinnati, Ohio. During these years, Harvey became invested in politics with the Whig Party, and campaigned extensively for the election of William Henry Harrison, distinguishing himself as a persuasive public speaker. Also around this time, Lewis also entered into correspondence with a local society called the "Boannergians" in the Summer of 1841 at Western Reserve College in Hudson, Ohio, and it became a chapter of Beta Theta Pi on August 9, 1841.

== Wisconsin political career ==
Later in 1841, Harvey went west and decided to settle at Southport, in the Wisconsin Territory, (now Kenosha, Wisconsin). He initially worked in Kenosha as a teacher, and established an academy there. While teaching, he was also hired as editor of the Southport American (1843–1846), a Whig partisan newspaper; he became active in the political debates in the Wisconsin Territory and served in a number of local offices. He was appointed postmaster at Southport by President John Tyler in 1844, but served only briefly.

In 1847, Harvey moved west from Kenosha to the town of Clinton, in Rock County, Wisconsin, and opened a general store there. In the fall of 1847, a new constitutional convention was called after Wisconsin voters rejected the first attempt at a constitution. Harvey was elected as a delegate from Rock County to the second constitutional convention, which took place over the winter of 1847–1848. He was one of the youngest delegates to the convention, being only 27 years old at the time, but was active in the debates of the convention. At the convention, he served on the committee on education and school funds, and helped shape the education-related language (Article X) of the new constitution.

In 1851, Harvey moved again, to the hamlet of Waterloo (now known as Shopiere) in the neighboring township of Turtle; he purchased a Hydropower mill on the Turtle Creek. As part of his purchase, he tore down a distillery that had previously utilized that power source, and won significant local praise for eliminating a public nuisance and improving the moral character of the area. In place of the distillery, Harvey established a flour mill, and also opened a retail store.

Wisconsin's 18th Senate district 1852–1860

In 1853, Harvey was elected to the Wisconsin Senate on the Whig Party ticket. He represented the 18th Senate district, which then comprised Beloit and the eastern half of Rock County. His first term in the Senate coincided with the outrage over the capture of Joshua Glover in Racine, and he took part in meetings leading to the organization of the Republican Party from a coalition of Whig and Free Soil partisans. Harvey was re-elected to another two-year term in the Senate in 1855, running on the new Republican Party ticket.

During the 1856 term, Harvey was elected president pro tempore of the Wisconsin Senate. He was mentioned as a potential candidate for United States senator in the 1857 election, but did not actively campaign in the caucus. In 1857, Harvey was a member of the Republican state central committee, and sought to build support in the party to obtain the Republican gubernatorial nomination in the 1857 election. The Republican gubernatorial nomination was hotly contested in 1857, and Harvey ultimately chose to withdraw from the contest before the state convention in September. Although he was not on the ballot, Harvey campaigned extensively around the western part of the state on behalf of the Republican gubernatorial nominee, Alexander Randall, and other Republican candidates.

After Randall was elected, Harvey continued operating as a close political ally of the governor, and was given a possibly dubious contract to purchase stationary on behalf of the state government. Harvey's loyalty and labor were rewarded in 1859 with the Republican nomination for Wisconsin secretary of state. Republicans swept all statewide offices in Wisconsin in the 1859 elections, and Harvey defeated his opponent, Alvin B. Alden, with 51% of the vote. As secretary of state, Harvey was an ex officio member of the University of Wisconsin Board of Regents, and became a strong advocate for university funding.

Harvey campaigned extensively for Abraham Lincoln and the Republican ticket in the 1860 elections. After the subsequent secession crisis and the attack on Fort Sumter, Harvey became a member of Governor Randall's war cabinet as they rushed to prepare the state for war, and to raise and equip volunteer regiments for federal service in the Union Army.

In the fall of 1861, Randall declared that he would not run for a third term as governor, and many in the Republican Party saw Harvey as a natural successor. The Republican state convention in 1861 was styled as the "Union convention", and included several War Democrats. Harvey received the majority of delegate votes on the first informal ballot for governor, and was declared the nominee. Despite a challenging economic situation in the state after the outbreak of the war, Harvey won a substantial majority in the general election, receiving 54% of the vote.

== Gubernatorial term and death ==
As governor, Harvey continued the rapid pace of volunteer mobilization, raising another five regiments in his first months in office.

The Battle of Shiloh, which took place in southwest Tennessee in early April 1862, resulted in severe casualties among three Wisconsin regiments. Harvey decided to organize an expedition to bring medical supplies to the Wisconsin troops who were being cared for in hospital boats on the Mississippi and Tennessee Rivers. Harvey visited and cheered troops at Cairo, Illinois, Mound City, Illinois, and Paducah, Kentucky.

On April 19, 1862, close to Shiloh, Harvey stopped overnight near Savannah, Tennessee. Late that evening, while trying to step from a tethered boat to a moving steamboat headed back north (a common but dangerous practice), Harvey fell into the Tennessee River and drowned, despite the strenuous rescue efforts of members of his party.

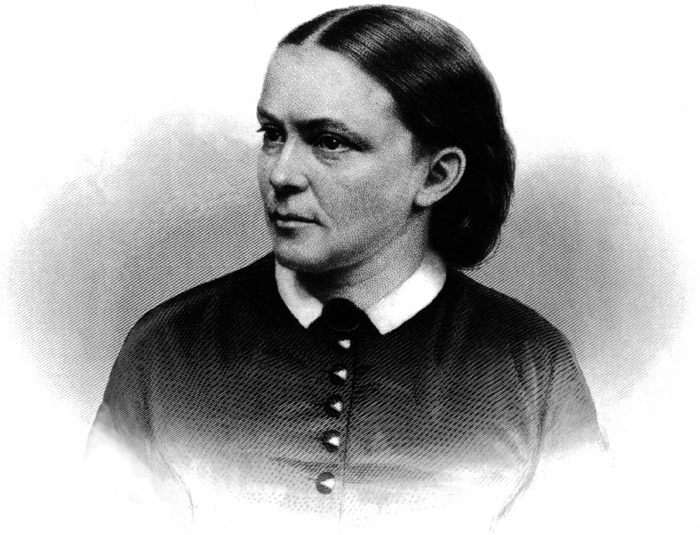
Cordelia A. P. Harvey, wife of Louis P. Harvey and First Lady of Wisconsin

Harvey was immediately succeeded as governor by his lieutenant governor, Edward Salomon. Harvey's body was found 14 days later, 65 miles downstream near Britt's Landing; his remains lay in state in the Wisconsin State Capitol, and he was buried in Forest Hill Cemetery, in Madison. His wife Cordelia became a leading war nurse, honored with the rank of colonel by Abraham Lincoln. She subsequently established veterans hospitals in Wisconsin, away from the war front, and a soldiers' orphans home. She is also interred at Forest Hill Cemetery, Madison, Wisconsin.

== Personal life and family ==
Louis Powell Harvey was the second of four children—and elder of two surviving children—born to David Harvey (1792–1871) and his wife Almira (née Powell; 1798–1876). David Harvey was also a politician in his era, and served in the Ohio House of Representatives during his residence in that state in the 1840s. Louis's younger brother, John Stanley Harvey, served on the Chicago Board of Trade, and later went west to California and established a citrus orchard.

The Harvey family were descendants of Thomas Harvey (1617–1651), who emigrated to the Massachusetts Bay Colony in 1636 with his brother William (1614–1658).

Louis Harvey's maternal uncle Oliver S. Powell followed them to Rock County, Wisconsin, and served as pastor of the congregational church there until his accidental drowning in 1855.

Louis Harvey married Cordelia A. Perrine on November 2, 1847. They had only one child, Mary, who died young.

== Electoral history ==
=== Wisconsin secretary of state (1859) ===
Wisconsin Secretary of State Election, 1859
Party	Candidate	Votes	%	±%
General Election, November 8, 1859
Republican	Louis P. Harvey	63,453	51.50%	
Democratic	Alvin B. Alden	59,765	48.50%	
Plurality		3,688	2.99%	
Total votes		123,218	100.0%	
Republican gain from Democratic				

=== Wisconsin governor (1861) ===
Wisconsin Gubernatorial Election, 1861
Party	Candidate	Votes	%	±%
General Election, November 5, 1861
Republican	Louis P. Harvey	53,777	54.18%	+0.97pp
Democratic	Benjamin Ferguson	45,456	45.80%	−0.80pp
	Scattering	25	0.03%	
Plurality		8,321	8.38%	+1.77pp
Total votes		99,258	100.0%	-11.97%
Republican hold				

Party political offices
Preceded by Alexander W. Randall	Republican nominee for Governor of Wisconsin; 1861	Succeeded by James T. Lewis
Political offices
Preceded by David W. Jones	Secretary of State of Wisconsin; 1860 – 1862	Succeeded by James T. Lewis
Preceded by Alexander W. Randall	Governor of Wisconsin; 1862	Succeeded by Edward Salomon
