= Lathrop Burgess =

American politician (1805–1899)

Lathrop Burgess (August 31, 1805 – March 11, 1899) was an American carpenter and farmer from Brighton, Wisconsin, who spent two one-year terms as a member of the Wisconsin State Assembly from Kenosha County; the first as a Freesoiler, the second as a Republican.

== Background ==
Burgess was born August 31, 1805, in Chatham, New York. He worked as a carpenter before he came to Brighton, Wisconsin Territory in 1838 with his wife. He lived there for the rest of his life.

== Civic affairs and public office ==
Burgess held various local offices such as justice of the peace In June 1850, he was one of the founding vice-presidents of the Agricultural Society of Kenosha County.

He was elected to the Assembly from the 2nd Kenosha County district (the Towns of Brighton, Bristol, Paris, Salem and Wheatland) in 1851 as a Freesoiler or "Free Democrat", succeeding Henry Johnson (a Whig). He was succeeded the next year by James McKisson, a Democrat.

In 1852, he was one of the judges for farming implements at the Kenosha County Fair. By September 1854, he was a member of the new Republican Party, and a delegate to its state convention. In 1856, he was again elected to the Assembly from the same Kenosha County district, succeeding the same Henry Johnson. By this time, however, Johnson was also a Republican. Burgess was not a candidate for re-election, and was succeeded by another Republican, Almond Cornwell.

== After the Assembly ==
Until its 1857 merger to form what later became part of the Chicago, Rock Island and Pacific Railroad, Burgess was on the board of directors of the Kenosha and Rockford Railroad Company.

His son, Dwight L. Burgess, was elected to the Assembly in 1888.

Burgess died at Brighton on March 11, 1899. He is buried in Salem Mound Cemetery in Salem, Kenosha County, Wisconsin. His papers are in the collection of the State Historical Society of Wisconsin.
