= Matt G. Siebert =

American politician (1883–1961)

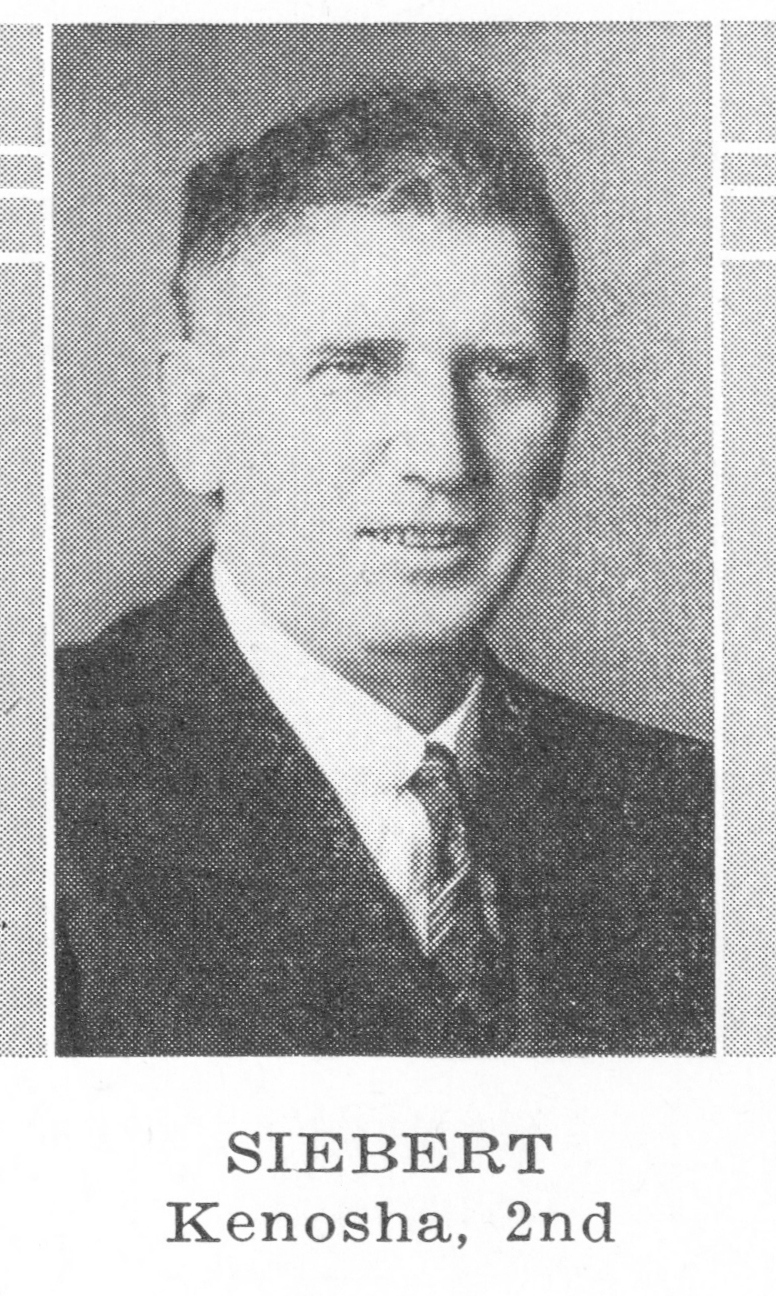
Matt G. Siebert

Matt G. Siebert (March 11, 1883 – October 26, 1961) was a member of the Wisconsin State Assembly.

== Biography ==
Siebert was born on March 11, 1883, in Stevens Point, Wisconsin. He was married to Carolina J. Lager. Siebert died on October 26, 1961, and is buried in Wilmot, Wisconsin.

== Career ==
Siebert was a member of the Assembly twice. First, from 1935 to 1936 and second, from 1939 to 1946. He was also an unsuccessful candidate for the Assembly in 1948. Additionally, Siebert was Chairman of Salem, Kenosha County, Wisconsin, and a member of the Kenosha County, Wisconsin Board. Originally a Democrat, he later became a Republican.
