= Wisconsin's Fond du Lac County 2nd Assembly district =

Former American legislative district

Wisconsin's Fond du Lac County 2nd State Assembly district
- Obsolete
- Notes: 1848–1972

Wisconsin's Fond du Lac County 2nd Assembly district was a district in the Wisconsin State Assembly for most of the history of the state of Wisconsin, up to the legislative redistricting reforms of 1972 which created the current numbered districts. Located in central Wisconsin, the district was one of the 66 original Assembly districts defined in Article XIV of the Constitution of Wisconsin. The Constitution originally allocated five districts for Fond du Lac County, Wisconsin; this district originally comprised the western half of Fond du Lac County.

The district was in use for the first 124 years of Wisconsin's history, from 1848 to 1972.

== List of representatives ==
List of representatives from the Fond du Lac County 2nd district
Member	Party	Residence	Term start	Term end	Leg.
District created
Jonathan Daugherty	Whig	Rosendale	June 5, 1848	January 1, 1849	1st
Jonathan Daugherty	F.S.	Rosendale	January 1, 1849	January 7, 1850	2nd
Bertine Pinckney	Whig	Ripon	January 7, 1850	January 6, 1851	3rd
Morris S. Barnett	Dem.	Eldorado	January 6, 1851	January 5, 1852	4th
Nicholas M. Donaldson	Whig	Waupun	January 5, 1852	January 3, 1853	5th
Charles D. Gage	Dem.	New Fane	January 3, 1853	January 2, 1854	6th
Edward Boener	Dem.	Waupun	January 2, 1854	January 1, 1855	7th
Benjamin R. Harrington	Rep.	Byron	January 1, 1855	January 7, 1856	8th
Peter Johnson	Dem.	Ashford	January 7, 1856	January 5, 1857	9th
Morris S. Barnett	Rep.	Rosendale	January 5, 1857	January 4, 1858	10th
Henry D. Hitt	Rep.	Oakfield	January 4, 1858	January 3, 1859	11th
Warren Whiting	Rep.	Ladoga	January 3, 1859	January 2, 1860	12th
Benjamin H. Bettis	Rep.	Ladoga	January 2, 1860	January 6, 1862	13th 14th
Wiley Ward Hatcher	Dem.	Waupun	January 6, 1862	January 1, 1863	15th
Freeman M. Wheeler	Rep.	Nanaupa	January 1, 1863	January 4, 1864	16th
James McElroy	Union	Waupun	January 4, 1864	January 2, 1865	17th
John H. Brinkerhoff	Union	Waupun	January 2, 1865	January 1, 1866	18th
George F. Clark	Union	Bugle	January 1, 1866	January 7, 1867	19th
A. Chapin Whiting	Union	Ladoga	January 7, 1867	January 6, 1868	20th
Rollin C. Kelley	Rep.	Brandon	January 6, 1868	January 4, 1869	21st
Benjamin H. Bettis	Rep.	Ladoga	January 4, 1869	January 3, 1870	22nd
Roelof Sleyster	Rep.	Alto	January 3, 1870	January 2, 1871	23rd
John Aaron Baker	Rep.	Waupun	January 2, 1871	January 1, 1872	24th
Elihu Colman	Rep.	Fond du Lac	January 1, 1872	January 6, 1873	25th
Rensselaer Morse Lewis	Lib.R.	Fond du Lac	January 6, 1873	January 5, 1874	26th
Thomas S. Weeks	Dem.	Fond du Lac	January 5, 1874	January 4, 1875	27th
George Hunter	Rep.	Fond du Lac	January 4, 1875	January 3, 1876	28th
Edson A. Putnam	Rep.	Oakfield	January 3, 1876	January 1, 1877	29th
Wolcott Turner Brooks	Rep.	Waupun	January 1, 1877	January 7, 1878	30th
Almon Swan	Rep.	Oakfield	January 7, 1878	January 6, 1879	31st
Philip Greening	Dem.	Lamartine	January 6, 1879	January 5, 1880	32nd
Daniel Treleven	Rep.	Byron	January 5, 1880	January 3, 1881	33rd
Benjamin H. Bettis	Rep.	Waupun	January 3, 1881	January 2, 1882	34th
John Meiklejohn	Rep.	Fond du Lac	January 2, 1882	January 1, 1883	35th
James Franklin Ware	Rep.	Fond du Lac	January 1, 1883	January 5, 1885	36th
Samuel B. Stanchfield	Rep.	Fond du Lac	January 5, 1885	January 3, 1887	37th
Gaines A. Knapp	Rep.	Fond du Lac	January 3, 1887	January 7, 1889	38th
James W. Watson	Dem.	Fond du Lac	January 7, 1889	January 2, 1893	39th 40th
Louie Augustus Lange	Dem.	Fond du Lac	January 2, 1893	January 4, 1897	41st 42nd
Wynn Edwards	Rep.	Rosendale	January 4, 1897	January 2, 1899	43rd
Henry A. Ripley	Rep.	Oakfield	January 2, 1899	January 7, 1901	44th
James Fenelon	Rep.	Ripon	January 7, 1901	January 5, 1903	45th
John Loebs	Rep.	Campbellsport	January 5, 1903	January 2, 1905	46th
John W. Powell	Rep.	Rosendale	January 2, 1905	January 7, 1907	47th
Fred E. Soper	Rep.	Ripon	January 7, 1907	January 4, 1909	48th
James Fenelon	Rep.	Ripon	January 4, 1909	January 2, 1911	49th
Roy E. Reed	Rep.	Ripon	January 2, 1911	January 6, 1913	50th
William F. Sommerfield	Rep.	Oakfield	January 6, 1913	January 4, 1915	51st
Charles Van de Zande	Rep.	Campbellsport	January 4, 1915	January 1, 1917	52nd
John E. Johnson	Rep.	Brandon	January 1, 1917	January 1, 1923	53rd 54th 55th
Thomas Dieringer	Rep.	Campbellsport	January 1, 1923	January 7, 1929	56th 57th 58th
Walter N. Beck	Rep.	Campbellsport	January 7, 1929	January 5, 1931	59th
H. Albert Wrucke	Rep.	Campbellsport	January 5, 1931	January 2, 1933	60th
Joseph H. Hardgrove	Dem.	Eden	January 2, 1933	January 7, 1935	61st
John E. Johnson	Prog.	Brandon	January 7, 1935	January 4, 1937	62nd
Arthur F. Hinz	Rep.	Ripon	January 4, 1937	January 6, 1941	63rd 64th
Alfred Van De Zande	Rep.	Campbellsport	January 6, 1941	January 3, 1949	65th 66th 67th 68th
Charles A. Peterson	Rep.	Rosendale	January 3, 1949	January 5, 1953	69th 70th
Charles A. Peterson	Rep.	Rosendale	January 5, 1953	August 14, 1953	71st
--Vacant--			August 14, 1953	January 3, 1955	71st
Fred W. Schlueter	Rep.	Ripon	January 3, 1955	January 4, 1965	72nd 73rd 74th 75th 76th
William S. Schwefel	Rep.	Oakfield	January 4, 1965	January 1, 1973	77th 78th 79th 80th
District abolished by 1971 Wisconsin Act 304; Fond du Lac County was divided between the 6th, 52nd, 53rd, 57th, and 72nd Assembly districts The Fond du Lac County 2nd district did not have a close analogue in the new map
