= 1996 Southern Ontario tornadoes =

Weather event in Canada

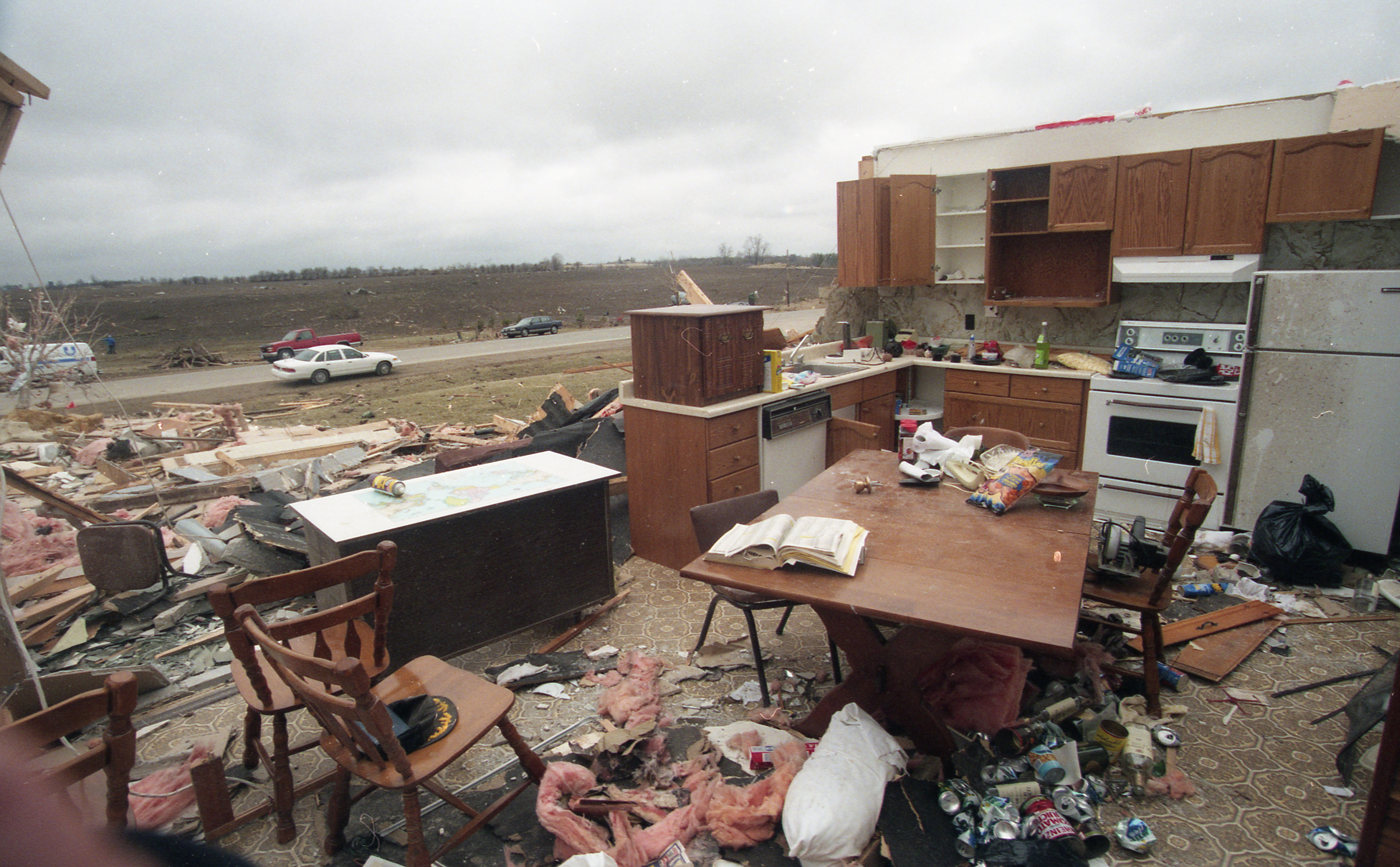
- April 21, 1996 – Arthur, Ontario – Interior of destroyed house. Tornado struck night before.

Meteorological history
- Duration: April 20, 1996

Tornado outbreak
- Tornadoes: 3 confirmed
- Max. rating: F3 tornado
- Duration: 2–3 hours

Overall effects
- Injuries: 9
- Damage: In 1996 Canadian Dollars: $8 million (adjusted to 2011, CDN $11 million)
- Areas affected: Southern Ontario
- Part of the Tornado outbreak sequence of April 1996 and tornado outbreaks of 1996

Southern Ontario's worst tornado outbreak of the decade came on Saturday, April 20, 1996. Severe weather had raked parts of the U.S. Midwest the day before, where seventeen F2 or greater tornadoes touched down (ten in Illinois alone). A cold front was being dragged eastward into unusually warm and unstable air associated with a strong storm system moving through the northern tier of the U.S. Out of the two significant tornadoes that day, both rated F3, it was remarkable that there were no deaths. Nine people escaped with minor injuries.

Many homes were severely damaged in Williamsford, Arthur, and Violet Hill. Many areas that experienced the tornadoes on May 31, 1985, were hit once again, especially the Grand Valley area. The first tornado that touched down tore a 40 kilometre long path southeast of Owen Sound. A second tornado touched down farther south and took a 60 kilometre track from Arthur to just southwest of Barrie. There was a third brief touchdown near Orillia associated with the parent storm of the second tornado.

== Grey County tornado ==
Ahead of the main cold front, a separate storm formed into a supercell southwest of Williamsford in Grey County, likely triggered by the aging squall line further west. Then, at about 5:50pm, a funnel cloud touched down about 5 kilometres (3.1 miles) southwest of Williamsford. Only sporadic tree damage took place at this point. The storm was high-based, and there was a large gap between the tornado and the core of the storm which was consistent through much of the tornado's life. The wall cloud was large and showed clear signs of rotation.

As the tornado passed through town, it was large and messy, and divided into multiple vortices shortly after. The collective width of the damage path was about 400 metres (440 yards) wide and extensive debris filled the air. At Williamsford, the storm did extensive F3 damage to a strip of homes along Chatsworth Road 24, a township concession road. It then crossed Williams Lake, damaging some cottages and ripping up trees. As it crossed the small lake, it became a waterspout for a brief time, and some of the multiple vortices became visible. The tornado continued to move northeast and, as it neared Holland Centre, the winds hurled a 10,000-litre (2,600-US-gallon) gasoline tank (weighing approximately two tonnes) for more than 1.6 kilometres (1,700 yards). At this point, the tornado crossed Highway 10.

As the tornado neared the town of Walters Falls, it became more compact, but did not weaken. Damage was continuous but involved only trees. East of Walters Falls, the tornado became very strange in appearance as the funnel split into two separate vortices. A debris cloud persisted under both of these funnels as they rotated around each other. The tornado then rolled through the town of Blantyre where some homes suffered F2 damage. Shortly afterward the tornado began to weaken and finally lifted just before 6:30 pm. The parent storm then moved out over the cold waters of Georgian Bay near Meaford, where it rapidly dissipated.

== Wellington and Dufferin County tornado ==
The storm in Wellington County initially formed northwest of London around 5:00pm and slowly moved northeast where it began to produce funnel clouds. The first touchdown was about 8 kilometres (5.0 miles) southwest of Arthur at 6:10 pm. A small funnel cloud was visible, but there was mostly just a large mass of dust at the ground. Within the next few minutes, the tornado began to take on a tube-like form. It was a multiple-vortex tornado, with as many as four distinct vortices inside the main path. The tornado's overall width was about 400 metres (440 yards). It went quickly from F1 to F2 and widened, then became an F3 as it approached town from the southwest.

Extensive damage began on the west side of Arthur shortly thereafter. As the tornado passed Highway 6, it was at its peak strength. The tornado had a separate companion for a brief time, a thin black appendage that swept around the front of the main circulation. As the main tornado crossed the highway, it destroyed a barn full of hay which tinted the tornado yellow for a brief time. The tornado's parent supercell also became more intense. A torrent of rain and hail preceded the tornado around the north side of the path.

The mesocyclone was rather large, even pulling in some of the precipitation from ahead of the storm. As the storm moved farther to the northeast, it nearly destroyed several farms before it plowed into the Luther Marsh, north of Grand Valley. East of the marsh, the storm weakened somewhat and the tornado narrowed in width. Upper-level winds were stretching out the storm causing a larger gap between the precipitation core and the tornado, thus making it even more visible to people in the storm's path. South of the tornado, it was warm, windy, and free of precipitation, with a spectacular view of the storm. The tornado damaged more homes and then crossed Highway 25, taking down several hydro transformers in one very bright power flash. The tornado now had a textbook-style appearance as a narrow wedge.

F2 damage continued on as the tornado approached the town of Shelburne in Dufferin County. Pieces of sheet metal and wood fell from the sky and littered the southern end of town after they were thrown out of the tornado. It then damaged more homes and buildings as it ripped across the southeast end of town. The tornado stayed at around F2–F3 intensity as it moved out of Shelburne into more open country. The path was now about 125 metres (137 yards) wide. It then moved toward the suburban town of Violet Hill, where several more homes sustained F2–F3 damage. Not long after, the tornado began dying out as its path narrowed to 50 metres (55 yards). Outflow from the core of the storm undercut the mesocyclone, and the tornado lifted by 7:00 pm. This storm went on to produce another brief touchdown southwest of Orillia but all severe weather died down after sunset.

== Seasonal rarity ==
Climatologists consider these Canadian tornadoes to have been quite a rare occurrence considering the early date. Never before have such intense and long tracked tornadoes occurred this early in the season in Canada.

April 1996 was unseasonably cold, so there was still snow on the ground in some areas and Lake Huron was still covered in ice. In fact, the Grey County tornado lifted a thick sheet of ice off of a pond before depositing it nearby. Light snows also fell after the event in the areas hardest hit by the tornadoes, which hampered the clean-up efforts.
