= Oakfield (town), Wisconsin =

Town in Fond du Lac County, Wisconsin

Oakfield, Wisconsin
- Town
- Town of Oakfield
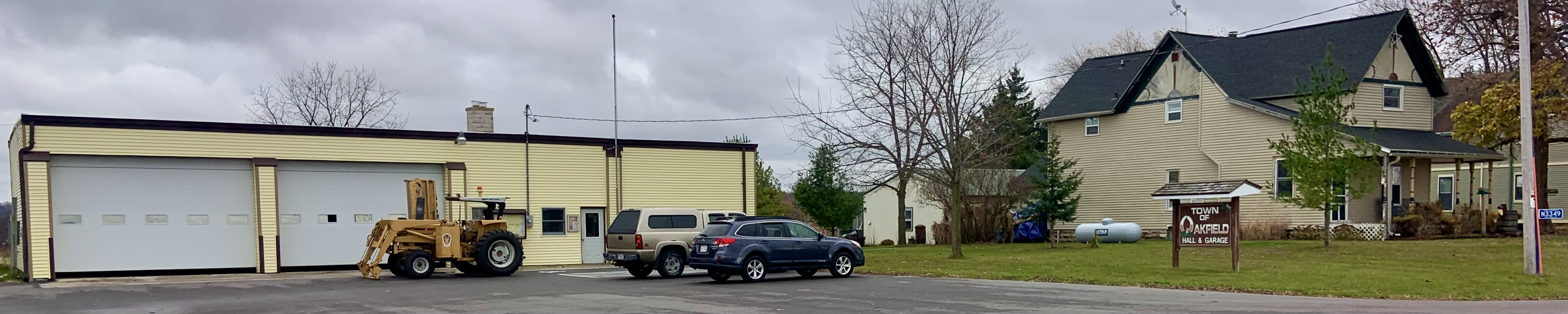
- Oakfield Town Hall

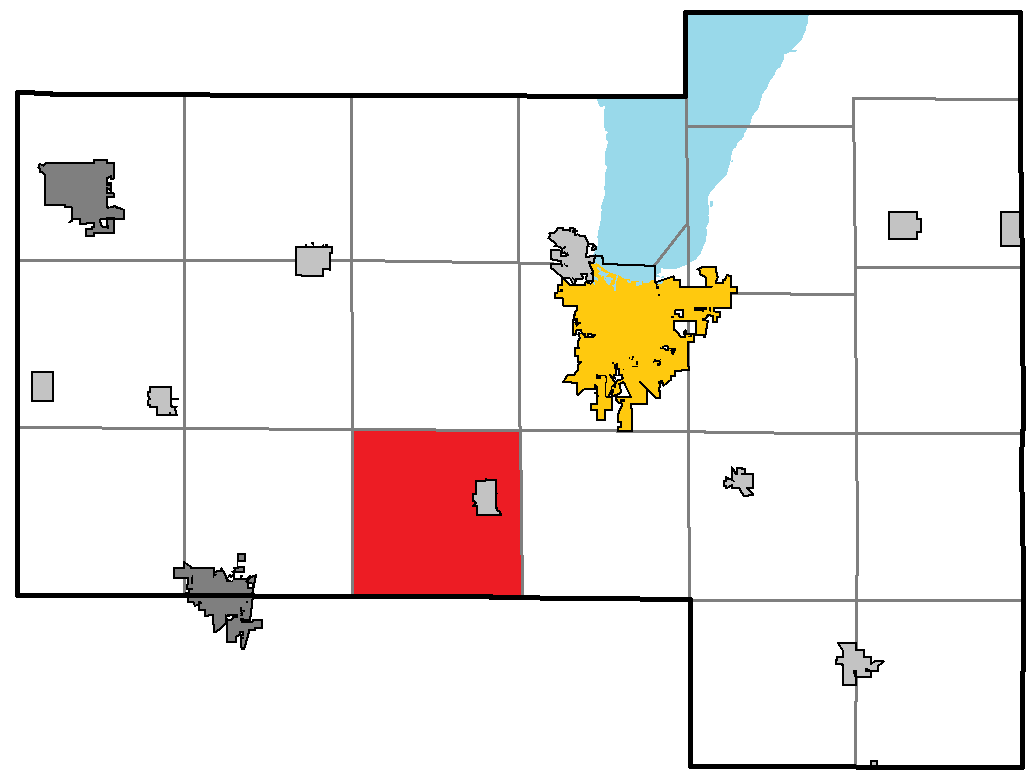
- Location of Oakfield, within Fond du Lac County
- Coordinates: 43°40′33″N 88°35′21″W
- Country: United States
- State: Wisconsin
- County: Fond du Lac

Area
  - Total: 35.76 sq mi (92.6 km^{2})
  - Land: 35.47 sq mi (91.9 km^{2})
  - Water: 0.29 sq mi (0.75 km^{2})

Population (2020)
  - Total: 681
  - Density: 19.2/sq mi (7.41/km^{2})
- Time zone: UTC-6 (Central (CST))
  - Summer (DST): UTC-5 (CDT)
- Area code(s): 920 & 274
- GNIS feature ID: 1583839

Oakfield is a town in Fond du Lac County, Wisconsin, United States. The population was 681 at the 2020 census. The Village of Oakfield is located within the town. The unincorporated community of Oak Center is also located in the town.

== Geography ==
According to the United States Census Bureau, the town has a total area of 35.8 square miles (92.7 km^{2}), of which 35.8 square miles (92.6 km^{2}) is land and 0.1 square mile (0.1 km^{2}) (0.14%) is water.

== Demographics ==
As of the census of 2000, there were 767 people, 252 households, and 203 families residing in the town. The population density was 21.5 people per square mile (8.3/km^{2}). There were 267 housing units at an average density of 7.5 per square mile (2.9/km^{2}). The racial makeup of the town was 99.61% White, 0.13% Native American and 0.26% Asian. 0.13% of the population were Hispanic or Latino of any race.

There were 252 households, out of which 41.3% had children under the age of 18 living with them, 75.0% were married couples living together, 2.8% had a female householder with no husband present, and 19.4% were non-families. 16.7% of all households were made up of individuals, and 7.9% had someone living alone who was 65 years of age or older. The average household size was 3.04 and the average family size was 3.46.

In the town, the population was spread out, with 30.4% under the age of 18, 7.7% from 18 to 24, 27.6% from 25 to 44, 24.9% from 45 to 64, and 9.4% who were 65 years of age or older. The median age was 36 years. For every 100 females, there were 112.5 males. For every 100 females age 18 and over, there were 113.6 males.

The median income for a household in the town was $51,917, and the median income for a family was $53,558. Males had a median income of $37,375 versus $23,125 for females. The per capita income for the town was $18,615. About 0.9% of families and 2.1% of the population were below the poverty line, including 1.2% of those under age 18 and 5.1% of those age 65 or over.

== Notable people ==
- Henry D. Hitt, legislator
- Almon Swan, legislator
- Edgar Wilcox, legislator

== F5 Tornado ==
On July 18, 1996, a supercell thunderstorm dropped an F5 tornado which destroyed much of the town. The tornado roped out in the town of Eden. There were a total of 12 tornadoes that day in southeastern Wisconsin.
