= Warren Whiting =

19th century American politician

The Reverend Warren Whiting
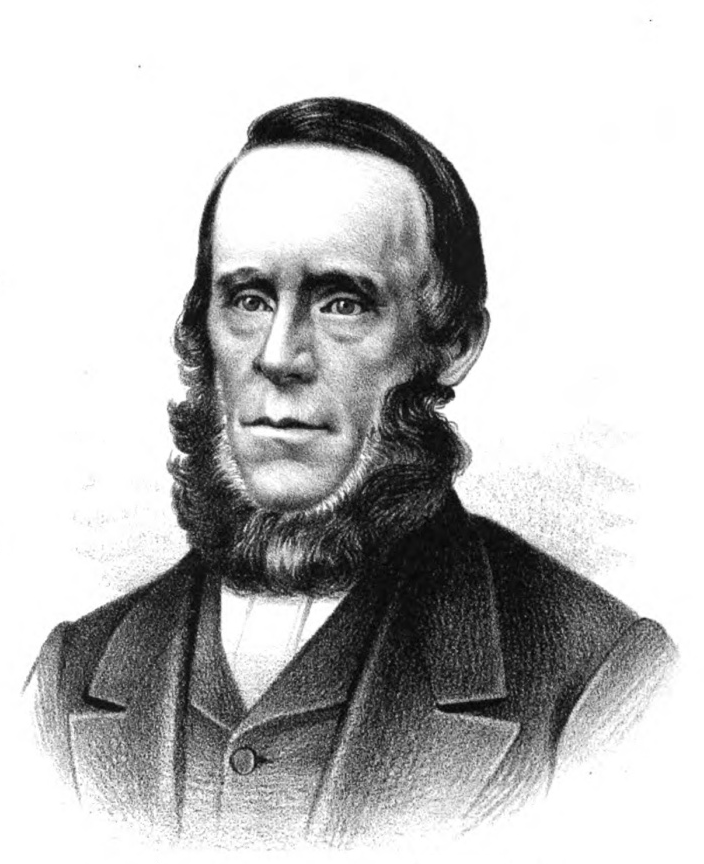
- From Portrait and biographical album of Fond du Lac County, Wisconsin (1889)

Member of the Wisconsin State Assembly from the Fond du Lac 2nd district
- In office January 3, 1859 – January 2, 1860
- Preceded by: Henry D. Hitt
- Succeeded by: Benjamin H. Bettis

Personal details
- Born: October 12, 1816 Douglas, Massachusetts, U.S.
- Died: January 2, 1897 (aged 80) Waupun, Wisconsin, U.S.
- Resting place: Wedges Prairie Cemetery, Waupun, Wisconsin
- Party: Republican; Natl. Union (1863–1867); Whig (before 1854)
- Spouses: Lorinda Keith (m. 1839; died 1884); Ellen C. (Norstraint) (m. 1885; died 1886); Ellen O'Harrow (m. 1887; died 1888); Eunice E. B. (Eddy) (m. 1890–1897)
- Children: Lydia Sophia (Sikes)^{(b. 1840; died 1922)}; John E. Whiting^{(b. 1842; died 1859)}; Ethan Ellis Whiting^{(b. 1845; died 1921)}; Alice Emory (Chandler)^{(b. 1852; died 1913)}
- Relatives: Anderson Whiting (brother); A. Chapin Whiting (brother)
- Occupation: Farmer, minister

Warren Whiting (October 12, 1816 – January 2, 1897) was an American farmer, minister, and Wisconsin pioneer. He served in the Wisconsin State Assembly, representing Fond du Lac County during the 1859 session.

== Biography ==
Warren Whiting was born in Douglas, Massachusetts, in October 1816. As a child, he moved with his parents to Erie County, New York, where his father owned a farm. He worked on his father's farm until age 21, when he went out on his own, working as a farm-hand for hire.

At age 26, he began preaching as a minister of the Free Will Baptist church. He preached for thirty-five years until his health prevented him from carrying on that work.

At age 30, Whiting left New York and moved to the Wisconsin Territory, where three of his brothers—Anderson, Joseph, and Ellis—had already become established. He stopped first in Rock County, Wisconsin, where his brother Joseph owned a farm, then went north to Fond du Lac County, where his brother Ellis had settled. He purchased a farm in the town of Waupun in 1846, which he expanded to 600 acres during his life.

== Political career ==
Warren Whiting began as a member of the Whig Party, and became a staunch Republican when that party was established in the 1850s. He was elected to the Wisconsin State Assembly in 1858, and served in the 1859 session of the Legislature.

== Personal life and family ==
Warren Whiting was the second of eight children born to Amos Whiting and Elsie (née Chase). Four of his brothers also emigrated from New York to Wisconsin, and two of them also served in the Wisconsin State Assembly—Anderson Whiting and A. Chapin Whiting.

The Whitings were descendants of Nathaniel Whiting, who emigrated from England to the Massachusetts Bay Colony in 1638 and was one of the founders of Dedham, Massachusetts.

Warren Whiting married four times. His first wife was Lorinda Keith, of Madison County, New York; they wed on September 5, 1839, and were married for 45 years before her death in 1884. 15 months later, he married the widow Ellen C. Norstraint (née Ross), but she died just a year later. On May 17, 1887, Whiting married Ellen O'Harrow, but she also died after just a year of marriage. Whiting's fourth and final marriage occurred in May 1890, he married the widow Eunice E. B. Eddy.

Warren Whiting had four children, all of them with his first wife, Lorinda. Their first child died young, but the other three children survived him.

Wisconsin State Assembly
Preceded by Henry D. Hitt	Member of the Wisconsin State Assembly from the Fond du Lac 2nd district January 3, 1859 – January 2, 1860	Succeeded by Benjamin H. Bettis
