= Oak Center =

Oak Center may refer to:

== Places ==
United States

- Oak Center, Minnesota, an unincorporated community
- Oak Center, Wisconsin, an unincorporated community
