= Edgar Wilcox =

American politician

Edgar Wilcox (January 20, 1830 – October 25, 1917) was a politician and farmer.

Born in Genesee County, New York, Wilcox moved with his parents to Sugar Creek Wisconsin Territory in 1845. In 1849, Wilcox and his family moved back to New York. In 1857, Wilcox moved to the Town of Oakfield, Fond du Lac County, Wisconsin and settled on a farm. Wilcox served as town clerk and town school superintendent. In 1864, Wilcox served in the Wisconsin State Assembly and was a Republican. He died in Oakfield, Wisconsin.
