= Tornadoes of 1996 =

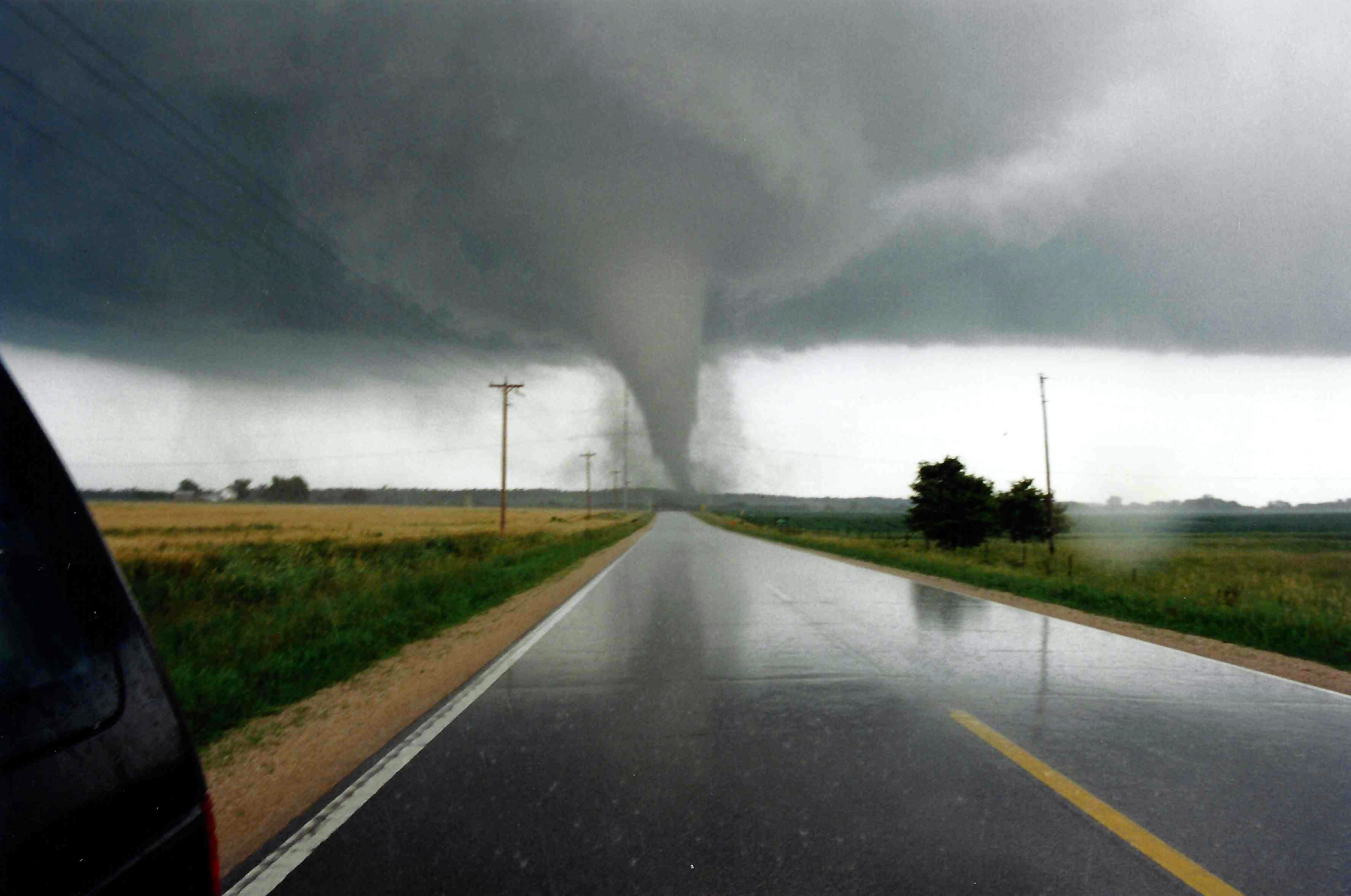
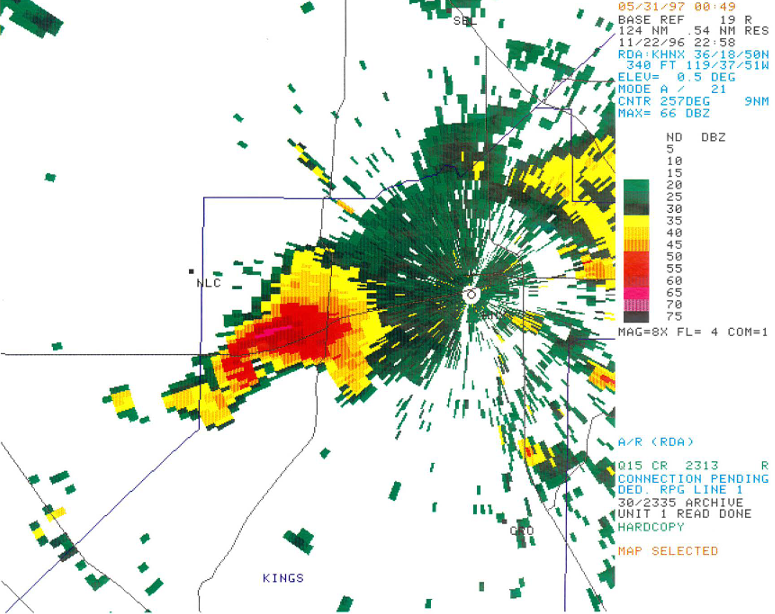
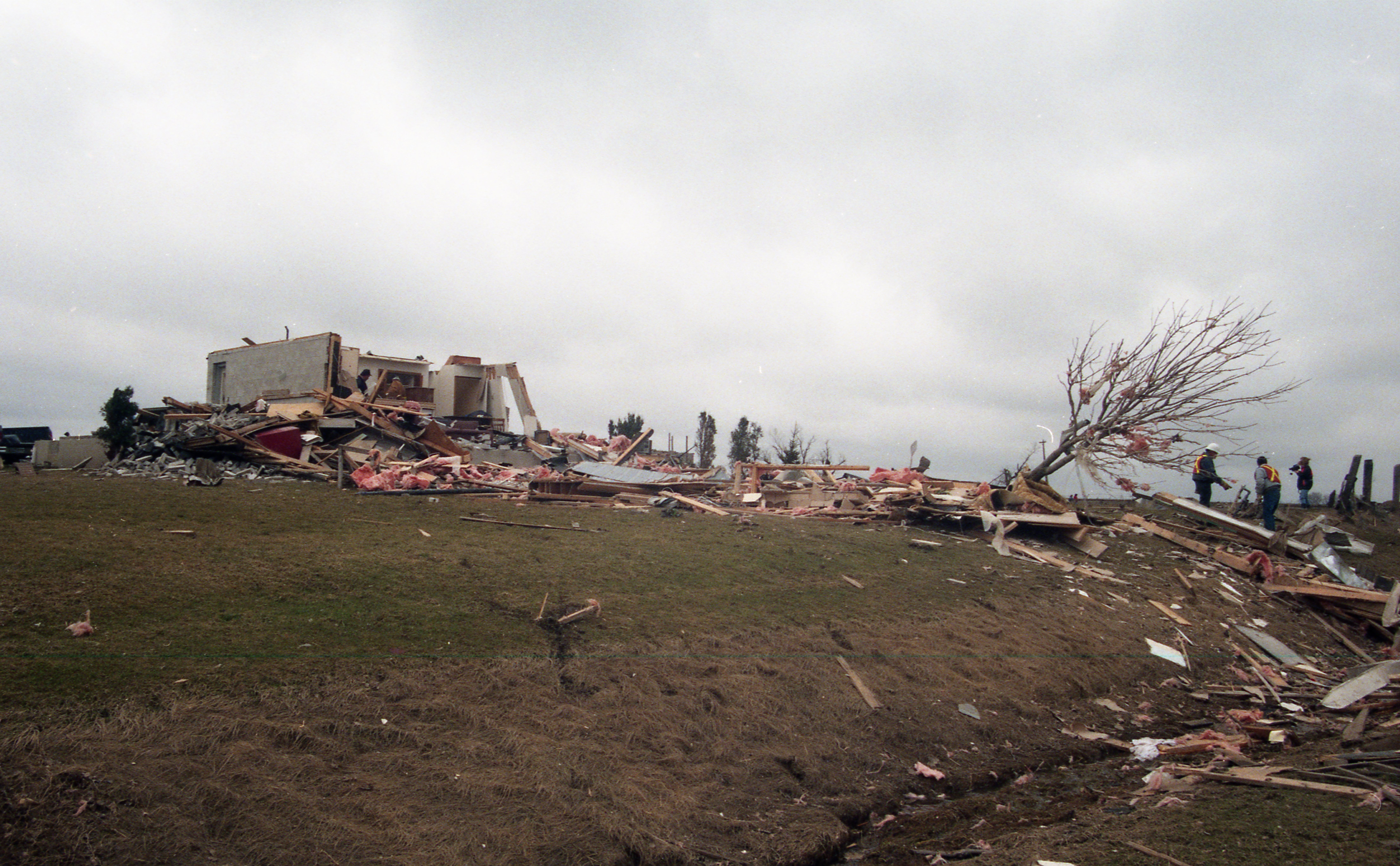
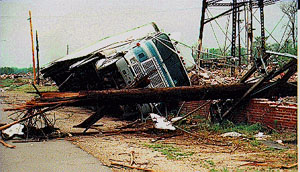
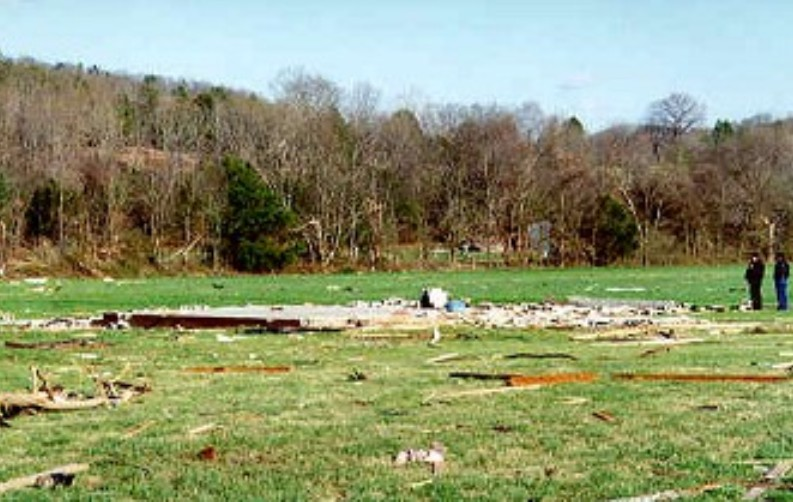
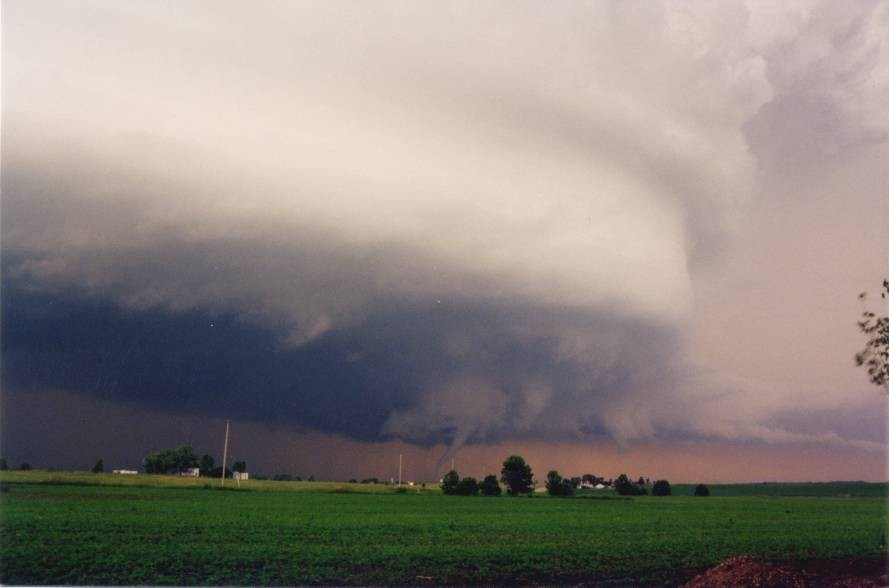
- Clockwise from top: A narrow F5 tornado approaching Oakfield, Wisconsin on July 18; A house in Arthur, Ontario after being struck by an F3 tornado on April 20; F4 damage in rural Izard County, Arkansas after a tornado on April 14; An F1 tornado near Port Washington, Wisconsin on July 18; A bus overturned in Fort Smith, Arkansas after an F3 tornado on April 21; Radar scan of an F1 tornado over Lemoore Naval Air Station on November 22.
- Timespan: January - December 1996
- Maximum rated tornado: F5 tornado: Oakfield, Wisconsin on July 18
- Tornadoes in U.S.: 1,173
- Damage (U.S.): $720 million
- Fatalities (U.S.): 26
- Fatalities (worldwide): >626

This page documents the tornadoes and tornado outbreaks of 1996, primarily in the United States. Most tornadoes form in the U.S., although some events may take place internationally. Tornado statistics for older years like this often appear significantly lower than modern years due to fewer reports or confirmed tornadoes, however by the 1990s tornado statistics were coming closer to the numbers we see today.

== Synopsis ==
Fatal United States tornadoes in 1996
- Approximate touchdown location of killer tornadoes in 1996 Summary of tornadoes: January 26 – Alabama (1 death); February 2 – Florida (1 death); March 6 – Alabama (4 deaths); March 6 – Alabama (2 deaths); April 14 – Arkansas (7 deaths); April 19 – Illinois (1 death); April 21 – Arkansas, Oklahoma (2 deaths); April 21 – Arkansas (2 deaths); May 12 – Florida (1 death); July 18 – Wisconsin (1 death); November 8 – Georgia (1 death); November 30 – Louisiana (2 deaths); December 7 – Florida (1 death); Total fatalities: 26

The 1996 tornado season saw fairly average numbers across the board, though fatalities were lower than average at just 26. There were a few notable outbreaks, but most were outside the main "tornado alley" of the midwestern United States. The July F5 tornado that struck Oakfield, Wisconsin was the first F5 tornado since 1992, and the first F5 tornado in the state of Wisconsin since the 1984 Barneveld, Wisconsin tornado.

== Events ==
Confirmed tornado total for the entire year 1996 in the United States.

Confirmed tornadoes by Fujita rating
FU	F0	F1	F2	F3	F4	F5	Total
0	743	313	94	20	2	1	1,173

== January ==
There were 35 tornadoes confirmed in the US in January.

=== January 3 ===
Nine people were injured by an F1 tornado in Miami, Florida.

== February ==
There were 14 tornadoes confirmed in the US in February.

== March ==
There were 71 tornadoes confirmed in the US in March.

=== March 6 ===
FU	F0	F1	F2	F3	F4	F5
0	3	7	2	1	0	0

Tornadoes touched down across parts of Alabama, Georgia and Florida, with six deaths from two tornadoes in Alabama. An F3 tornado hit a trailer park on the northwest side of Selma, killing four people and injuring 40. Four tornadoes (three F1 and one F2) struck Montgomery, accompanied by damaging downbursts. The F2 tornado hit a mobile home park on the east side of the city, killing two people and injuring 17. One other person was injured by an F1 tornado near Iron City, Georgia.

== April ==
There were 177 tornadoes confirmed in the US in April.

=== April 14 ===
Two F4 tornadoes killed seven people in Stone and Izard Counties in Arkansas. The seven fatalities from this tornado were the most by one tornado in 1996. Among the fatalities were quarterback Kurt Warner's in-laws.

=== April 19–21 ===
FU	F0	F1	F2	F3	F4	F5
0	54	33	19	11	0	0

A series of tornado outbreaks occurred over a three-day period in Mid-April across a large area of Eastern North America. It was the most notable outbreak of the year; the 19th was the most prolific tornado outbreak in Illinois history. Six people were killed in the outbreak, and 11 tornadoes were rated as high as F3.

33 tornadoes hit Illinois breaking the old record of 25 set on August 10, 1974. This outbreak can also be compared to the May 2004 tornado outbreak sequence as it was a very large, deep and vigorous system. The same system produced tornadoes in Ontario on the 20th, and destructive tornadoes also occurred in Arkansas and Texas on the 21st.

== May ==
There were 235 tornadoes confirmed in the US in May.

=== May 13 (Bangladesh) ===
A strong tornado struck Jamalpur, Sirajganj and Tangail, in Bangladesh. Killing over 600 people, making it the deadliest tornado of the year and one of the deadliest tornadoes in history.

=== May 28 ===
A small, but destructive outbreak of tornadoes occurred in Central and Northern Kentucky in Late-May. The tornadoes resulted in over $100 million in damages and one tornado was rated F4. Despite the damage, there were no fatalities.

== June ==
There were 128 tornadoes confirmed in the US in June.

=== June 24 ===
FU	F0	F1	F2	F3	F4	F5
0	4	4	1	0	0	0

Nine tornadoes touched down across the US with seven of them striking the Mid-Atlantic in a small outbreak. The strongest event was an F2 tornado that hit Sudley Springs, Centreville, Legato, and Fairfax, Virginia west of Washington D.C., injuring one.

== July ==
There were 202 tornadoes confirmed in the US in July.

=== July 8 ===
FU	F0	F1	F2	F3	F4	F5
0	2	1	1	0	0	0

A rare F0 tornado touched down on Hans Lollik Island, Puerto Rico. Elsewhere, an F2 tornado touched down in Winthrop, Maine (just outside Augusta), striking Northern Litchfield, but causing no deaths or injuries. It was one of only two significant tornadoes to hit the Augusta area.

=== July 18 ===
FU	F0	F1	F2	F3	F4	F5
0	6	4	1	0	0	1

An F5 tornado destroyed parts of Oakfield, Wisconsin. The violent tornado developed outside of town and moved southeastward, taking direct aim at Oakfield. At 7:15 p.m., the tornado struck the town, injuring 12 people but killing none. It would be the only F5 tornado to hit the United States that year. The tornado's maximum width was about 400 yards (370 m) wide, making it one of the narrowest F5 tornadoes on record. There were 11 other tornadoes in Wisconsin from this storm complex, with one death at Marytown.

=== July 19 ===
FU	F0	F1	F2	F3	F4	F5
0	7	9	4	1	0	0

A band of slowly moving thunderstorms moved over Central Pennsylvania producing heavy rain and flooding, especially in the Altoona area where 700 homes were damaged. The storms also produced a family of tornadoes that moved through the area.

At 9:20 a.m. the first tornado, rated an F2, touched down 6 miles north of New Bethlehem in Clarion County. It tracked southeast into Jefferson County through Langville. The tornado lifted 1.5 miles west of Oliveburg. The tornado uprooted trees and rolled a mobile home, about a mile north of Truttsburg, damaged some homes, farms, and crops, and downed extensive swaths of trees along its path. It was on the ground for about 10 miles and averaged 100 yards in width.

At 9:45 am, just 5 minutes after the first tornado dissipated, a second F2 touched down 1.5 miles southeast of Punxsutawney. The tornado touched down in Jefferson County and traveled southeast into northeastern Indiana County northeast of Glen Campbell. In Jefferson county, damage was confined to trees.

The tornado then strengthened and began to cause even more severe damage just east of Rossiter Here, the tornado tore the roof off of a barn that a child, who was playing outside, had sought shelter in. Three of the four walls of the barn also collapsed. The child was not injured, but a horse that was inside the barn was sucked out and thrown 75 feet into a field. The tornado then traveled up a hill and significantly damaged one mobile home and destroyed a second after carrying it at least 75 yards across a road and smashing it against a row of trees. Three people inside the mobile home were injured, one critically. By this time, the tornado had reached its peak intensity of high-end F2. A nearby wood-frame house was destroyed and dense areas of trees felled or snapped. About a dozen other homes sustained damaged in this area, 5 extensively. 30 pound cinder blocks from a garage were thrown approximately 300 yards up a nearby hill where a stronger suction vortex was noted.

The tornado then tracked into Clearfield County, causing tree damage. The tornado then crossed Five Points into Cambria County across Glendale Lake in Prince Gallitzin State Park before ending 2 miles east of Frugality near the Blair County border, about 30 miles from its starting point. The storm damaged several mobile homes and farms in Five Points, picked a boat out the water on Glendale Lake and felled many trees in the park. A herringbone tree pattern was noted along with suction vortex damage to crops.

Around 11:00 AM, another F2 tornado touched down 2 miles east of Colver in Cambria County and tracked 6 miles southeast before ending 1 mile west of Loretto. The path width was 100 yard wide. Two homes and a barn were destroyed, several roofs and a second barn were also damaged. A central suction vortex was visible in crop damage.

At about the same time the tornado mentioned above formed, an F1 tornado touched down 2 miles northeast of Altoona in Blair County on Brush Mountain. This tornado moved southeast, taking down a swath of trees and caused and causing minor damage to homes along a 1.5 mile path near Sickles Corner. The path width was up to .5 miles wide.

Several other tornadoes touched down across Pennsylvania, Maryland, and several other states later in the day. A total of 20 tornadoes touched down, injuring nine.

== August ==
There were 72 tornadoes confirmed in the US in August.

== September ==
There were 101 tornadoes confirmed in the US in September.

=== September 11–13 (Spain) ===
FU	F0	F1	F2	F3	F4	F5
6	0	0	0	0	0	0

A medicane spawned six tornadoes across the Balearic Islands. Damage information about these tornadoes are unknown. The tornadoes were spawned by an interaction between a northeastward-drifting trough, the medicane, and the large-scale that permitted the formation of tornadoes within thunderstorms generated by the cyclone after making landfall, which was deemed as highly unusual.

== October ==
There were 68 tornadoes confirmed in the US in October.

=== October 26 ===
FU	F0	F1	F2	F3	F4	F5
0	8	13	5	0	0	0

An unusual tornadic event affected Nebraska, South Dakota and Minnesota. 26 tornadoes touched down, with five of them rated F2. It turned out to be a record breaking late-season tornado outbreak, although there were no fatalities.

== November ==
There were 55 tornadoes confirmed in the US in November.

== December ==
There were 15 tornadoes confirmed in the US in December.

== See also ==
- Tornado
  - Tornadoes by year
  - Tornado records
  - Tornado climatology
  - Tornado myths
- List of tornado outbreaks
  - List of F5 and EF5 tornadoes
  - List of North American tornadoes and tornado outbreaks
  - List of 21st-century Canadian tornadoes and tornado outbreaks
  - List of European tornadoes and tornado outbreaks
  - List of tornadoes and tornado outbreaks in Asia
  - List of Southern Hemisphere tornadoes and tornado outbreaks
  - List of tornadoes striking downtown areas
- Tornado intensity
  - Fujita scale
  - Enhanced Fujita scale
