= Julia Colman =

American temperance educator (1828–1909)

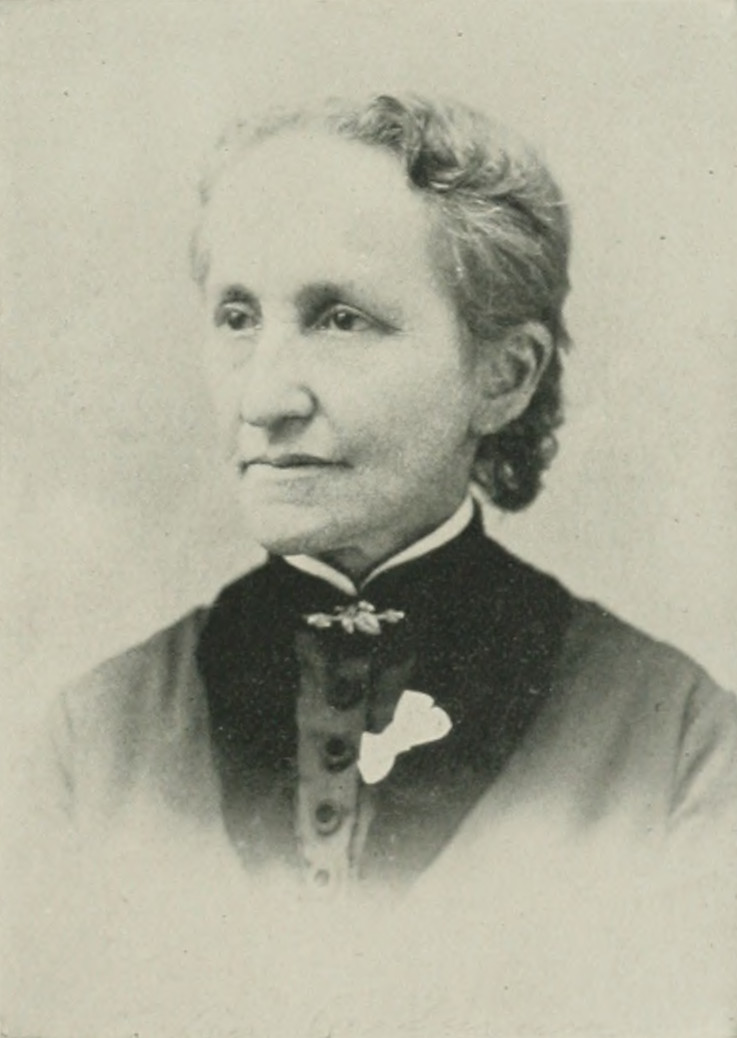
- Photo in A Woman of the Century
- Born: February 16, 1828; Northampton, Fulton County, New York, U.S.
- Died: January 10, 1909 (aged 80); Brooklyn, New York, U.S.
- Resting place: Fond du Lac, Wisconsin, U.S.
- Education: Lawrence University, Cazenovia Seminary
- Occupations: educator, activist, editor, writer
- Relatives: Henry R. Colman
- Writing career
- Pen name: Aunt Julia
- Language: English
- Notable works: The Temperance Handbook for Speakers and Workers
- Literary movement: temperance

Julia Colman (pen name, Aunt Julia; February 16, 1828 – January 10, 1909) was an American temperance educator, activist, editor and writer of the long nineteenth century. She served as superintendent of literature in the Woman's Christian Temperance Union (WCTU). Through many years of her life, Coleman was closely in touch with the National Temperance Society, for which she provided service. She contributed to the Society's educational and missionary sides by writing for its periodicals and for tract, pamphlet and book literature. Along these lines she made prominent the instruction of children and youth as well as adults in the principles of total abstinence and prohibition. She thoroughly believed in education as the great means of reaching success. Colman also prepared several series of leaflets for the WCTU. Among these might be mentioned the Union Leaflets, reaching 114 in number; the Gospel Handbills, reaching 67 numbers; and the Beer Series, reaching 57 numbers. She prepared over 450 leaflets and tracts that were issued by the National Temperance Society. Her most important work and the largest was entitled, The Temperance Handbook for Speakers and Workers, a volume of 178 pages. Her Alcohol and Hygiene for Schools had a large sale for many years, and her Juvenile Temperance Manual for Teachers was in demand. Colman devoted the larger portion of her time to this work of pushing and circulating educational literature. She was a contributing editor to The Union Signal.

== Early life and education ==
Julia Colman was born in Northampton, Fulton County, New York, in the valley of the Great Sacandaga Lake, February 16, 1828. She was of Puritan and Huguenot ancestry. The Colman family from England settled in Wethersfield, Connecticut, in 1634. About the year 1800, her grandfather's family moved "away out west" to Northampton, Montgomery County (now Fulton County), New York. Her mother, Livia Spier, was of Welsh ancestry, who came to Boston eight generations previously. Her father, Rev. Henry R. Colman, was a clergyman of the Methodist Episcopal Church. She had four brothers. In 1840, the family removed to Wisconsin, her father being sent as missionary to the Oneida people near Green Bay, Wisconsin. By 1847, they were at Fond du Lac, Wisconsin. From girlhood she was a devout evangelical Christian, a member of the Methodist Episcopal Church.

Here, in her juvenile efforts to communicate with Oneida children of the forest, Colman laid the foundation of that simplicity and directness of style for which her writings were noted, and which constituted the success of her extended literary productions. There were no schools in that region which she could attend, but the lack was supplied by careful home teaching. Before 1849, she commenced teaching in Calumet and Fond du Lac counties, "living in the parlor" —as boarding around from family to family was there termed— and industriously continuing her own studies as she could. During this period she commenced the study of botany, analyzing and classifying over 300 specimens before having the aid of any teacher. This was a rare achievement, strikingly indicating, and at the same time training her into those habits of careful research which later proved so useful in other departments.

In 1849, when Lawrence University, in Appleton, opened its doors for students, Colman was in the first classes. She remained there for nearly two years, and then spent two years at Cazenovia Seminary, New York, under Rev. Dr. Bannister, graduating in 1853, with the first class in the collegiate or five years' course. Her specialties were the languages and moral science, with unusual aptitude in physiology and chemistry.

== Career ==
=== Teacher and editor ===
After a year or two longer in teaching, she deliberately chose literary pursuits, accepting a position in the editorial office of the Methodist Sunday School Union and Tract Society, of the Methodist Publishing House, in New York City, where she remained over thirteen years, as librarian and assistant to Drs. Kidder, Wise, and Vincent, making acquaintance with editorial, publishing, and benevolent society work, which was of great value to her in her later positions. During a portion of this time, she assisted in editing the Sunday-School Advocate, which then had a circulation of nearly 400,000, and where her articles, signed "Aunt Julia," attracted much attention.

=== Anti-tobacco activist ===
Here she commenced a crusade against tobacco by inducing the boys to form local "Anti-Tobacco Leagues," to learn about tobacco, and to work against it, especially by distributing anti-tobacco literature. She provided them with a manual and other requisites, and over 100 such leagues were formed in different parts of the country. They were ephemeral, as boys' societies necessarily were, but they aimed in the right direction, and doubtless did something towards the anti-tobacco movement. It was, at all events, a foreshadowing of future work.

=== Continued study ===
Translations from the French and German of articles for the National Magazine and letters for the Christian Advocate, the preparation of a number of small books for children on natural history, anti-slavery, and temperance, were among the literary labors of that period. While benevolent efforts in the large Sunday-school of Greene Street Church, where for five years she was lady superintendent, constituted her outside work. These constant and pressing demands, however, finally proved too much for her health, and she relinquished a portion of them for a series of studies in medicine and physiology. Through these she found her way into restored health, which continued almost unbroken for an extended period of time. She was also led in this way into an acquaintance with the medical and scientific aspects of the temperance question. Always an abstainer, she then saw how she could work for total abstinence successfully, and she began in 1868 to write and lecture on the subject.

She took partial courses in different medical colleges, that she might learn their teachings about alcohol and obtain a sound physiological basis for further studies. She spoke before local temperance societies, teachers' institutes and Methodist conferences, delivering upward of 100 lectures previous to the crusade. Other engagements prevented her from taking an active part in the uprising, but in 1875, she entered the local work and originated the first "temperance school." That marked a new departure in the temperance work among the children, in that it was largely intellectual, the scholars being arranged in classes, reciting to teachers and reviewed by a superintendent, aided throughout by the systematized use of text-books, tracts, charts and experiments. Those educational methods commended themselves to the National WCTU, and Colman was elected editor of one page of the national organ for one year, to push that elementary work, which soon became the prevailing model throughout the woman's work and in other temperance organizations.

Previous to this, Colman, like most others, was largely unmoved by the needs of temperance. She saw and deplored intemperance, but, like those around her, she could see no effective method of checking it. The question had never come to her practically, either to her or to others she associated with, but now, in the course of these later studies, she saw a way of addressing temperance. She immediately began to study and write on the question, and, not finding sufficient access to the public through press sourced available to her, she prepared a lecture on "Alcohol our Enemy," which, after a good deal waiting, she was permitted to deliver. It was in March, 1868, before a crowded house in the church of which she was then a member, in the presence and with the assistance of her pastor and other influential friends, the lecture was given, and was subsequently repeated many times in other places.

Finding her time and interest engrossed in this topic of temperance and in the kindred subject of food and diet, she, in the autumn of 1867, severed her long connection with the Methodist Publishing House, where, however pleasant it might be, there was little chance (being a woman) of advancement. She then gave two courses of lectures on "Food" in the Dixon Institute, Brooklyn, New York, wrote a long series of articles on that subject for The Ladies' Repository, and still more for the Rural New Yorker, for Home and Health, Science of Health, Good Health, and other periodicals, besides temperance articles for the National Temperance Society, and for the Youth's Temperance Visitor in Maine. Through the latter, she was led incidentally to a long series of engagements to lecture in that State on temperance. This gave her the much-desired opportunity of studying the temperance problem upon that states, and learning the conditions which led to its advancement and success there. During the winter and spring of 1870 and 1871, she filled nearly 100 engagements, speaking sometimes before Methodist conferences and sometimes before teachers' institutes, where she advocated temperance teaching in the day school, sounding the first notes on that topic. She also prepared a series of sketches of the State WCTU presidents, published in Demorest's Magazine.

She finally concluded, however, that she could reach a greater number by the pen, if exclusively devoted to this subject, and thus more effectively promote a cause in which her interest was becoming more and more engrossed. She wished also to take a course of lectures in medicine, which she preferred to do at different colleges, that she might learn the various ideas about the uses of alcohol in medicine. She gave especial attention during this period of study to the chemical course. This broken method did not favor her taking a diploma, which, however, was offered her. But she declined the honor, as she did not propose to practice, and did not care to flourish a medical title. She also paid much attention to the chemistry and preparation of food, making investigations in several health institutions, and subsequently published no less than 75 consecutive articles on this subject in the Monthly Science of Health and Phrenological Journal.

=== Temperance reform ===
It was while carrying out some of these engagements, so that she could not give her personal attention to the cause, that the temperance crusade swept over the United States. In 1875, Colin was appointed superintendent of literature in the WCTU, which position she held for fifteen years. During that time, she wrote or edited and published upward of 500 books, tracts, pamphlets and lesson leaves. Among the books and pamphlets she wrote are: "The Catechisms on Alcohol and Tobacco" (1872), which reached a circulation of 300,000; "The Juvenile Temperance Manual for Teachers"; "The Primary Temperance Catechism"; "The Catechism on Beer"; "The Sunday School Temperance Catechism;" "The Temperance School"; "The Temperance Hand-Book for Speakers and Workers"; "An Evening with Robinson Crusoe," and smaller pamphlets, tracts and leaflets for juveniles and adults. She edited during that time The Young People's Comrade and The Temperance Teacher.

But when, in the summer of 1875, she retired to an inland country town for needed rest, taking with her for preparation the "Twenty Tracts on Temperance." Engaging actively in the new temperance work, which helped to start in that town a local Temperance union, and became Superintendent of the first so-called "Temperance School". For this, she wrote the "Catechism on Alcohol," which she had written and published three years before, and worked out the method afterwards developed in her "Lessons from Nature," published in Our Union in 1877, and more fully in the Juvenile Temperance Manual. Accounts of this school in the papers and elsewhere attracted attention, and at the National Convention of the WCTU, in Newark, New Jersey, in 1876, Colman was elected to edit one page of Our Union for the children, preparing lessons explanatory of the catechism. She was also made Chairman of a "Leaflet Committee", which was the starting point of the extended literature work, of which she served as Superintendent.

Her work in this department aimed to devise effective measures for the distribution of temperance literature, favoring special topics to harmonize with other lines of work, and more particularly the accurate knowledge of the nature and effects of intoxicants as indispensable to getting rid of them. This was to be followed with tract after tract, and then courses of readings on each topic, as "Readings on Beer," already issued. These were designed for the local unions, to be accompanied by the distribution of the tracts and hand-bills, one kind at a time. These would lead to the study of books which would become a part of a loan and reference library, and which could be made available and effective by the efforts of the members of the unions. Colman aimed not so much to produce new publications as to utilize the best of what was published. What was lacking she supplied, as in the Union Leaflets (71), especially adapted to the various needs of the woman's work; the Beer Series of Handbills (57); the Gospel Series (30), and so forth.

Still later, she wrote "Alcohol and Hygiene," a school textbook, intended to precede Richardson's Temperance Lesson Book in the grade schools. This was well received. She also commenced a series of "Leaflets for Young People," suited for distribution with others in schools and colleges. In a similar manner, she classified a great variety of the best tracts, handbills, and leaflets into sets, according to their character, so that it was easy to procure specimens of tracts for definite uses. Her directions were so simple and clear that the work of tract distribution was effective. She adapted a variety of tracts, leaflets, and hymn cards, making a complete system of requisites. She issued many chromo cards with temperance mottoes for birthday, holidays, Easter, Valentine's Day, and everyday use.

She also suggested and planned the dime collection system to supply the wants of her department. This plan was adopted by the National Convention at Boston in 1880. But it did not provide for her personal expenses, which she supplied mostly by her contributions to the press outside of her department labors, or by editorial work like that she bestowed upon the Young People's Comrade.

Catechism on Alcohol and Tobacco, published in 1885, was printed in several foreign languages, and the National Temperance Society sold over 300,000 copies of it. The Youth's Temperance Banner and The Water Lily, monthly periodicals issued by the National Temperance Society for use in Sunday schools, were at times edited by her. The Beauties of Temperance was one of the books prepared by Colman, but published by Eaton & Mains. In 1891, she ended her position as superintendent of the Department of Temperance Literature, but continued as superintendent of the Health Department, at the National WCTU, with her office in the Bible House, New York City.

An effective testing apparatus, capable of showing a variety of helpful chemical experiments, was put together by her. With its aid, she delivered courses of illustrated lectures in Silver Spring, Maryland, Ocean Grove, New Jersey, Toronto and other places, her main object having been to simplify scientific teachings and make them attractive to persons of all ages.

== Personal life ==
Colman died Sunday, January 10, 1909, at her home in Brooklyn, New York, and was buried in a family plot in Fond du Lac, Wisconsin. Her death was caused by gas asphyxiation, a "supposed accident" according to a coroner's medical doctor. The funeral service was held four days later, with Ella A. Boole, speaking on behalf of the WCTU. Some of her letters are located in Madison, Wisconsin at the Henry Root Colman Papers, State Historical Society of Wisconsin.

== Selected works ==
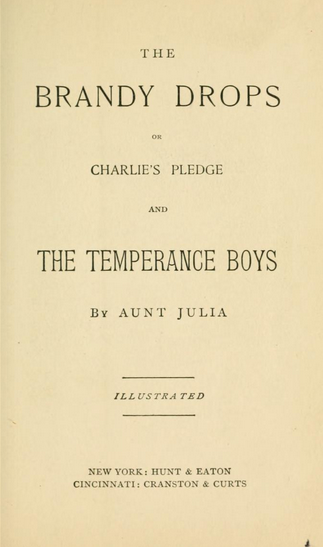
"The brandy drops; or, Charlie's pledge and The temperance boys"

- Catechism on alcohol, with responsive exercises on temperance, 1874
- Begin right, 188-
- Our chemical experiments of illustrate temperance teaching : containing lists and cuts of apparatus and full directions for using it, followed by a specimen lecture, 188-
- Shooting at a mark, 188-
- Alcohol and hygiene : an elementary lesson book for schools, 1882
- Methods of work with temperance literature, 1883
- Facts for firemen, soliers, sailors, and others in public service, 1883
- Readings on beer : an annual course of readings on beer, for local unions or other temperance organizations, 1885
- The catechism on beer : for advanced classes : (third grade), 1885
- Juvenile temperance manual for teachers, 1885
- The primary temperance catechism, 1885
- Catechism on alcohol and tobacco with scripture responsive exercises, 1885
- The temperance school; its object, organization, methods, and directions for starting it, 1886
- Juvenile temperance manual, 1886
- No king in America : a patriotic temperance programme : in three parts, 1888
- The temperance hand-book for speakers and workers, 1889
- Readings on cider. An annual course of readings for local unions, or other temperance organizations., 1889
- Our cider entertainment. A concert exercise. With tableaux vivants., 189-
- The Sunday-school temperance catechism. Containing some of the scriptural evidences for temperance., 1892
- Catechism for little water-drinkers. To precede the catechism on alcohol., 1896
- Temperance sunshine for the use of Epworth Leagues, 1899
- Questions and answers on temperance, 1900
