= Henry R. Colman =

American pioneer

Henry R. Colman (October 9, 1800 – February 7, 1895) was a Wisconsin pioneer and co-founder of Lawrence University, in Appleton, Wisconsin.

Rev. Henry Root Colman was born October 9, 1800, in Northampton, New York. He was the father of four children: Charles, born 1826, Henry, born 1834, Elihu, born 1841, and Julia. His son Henry served as a trustee of Lawrence University for 60 years.

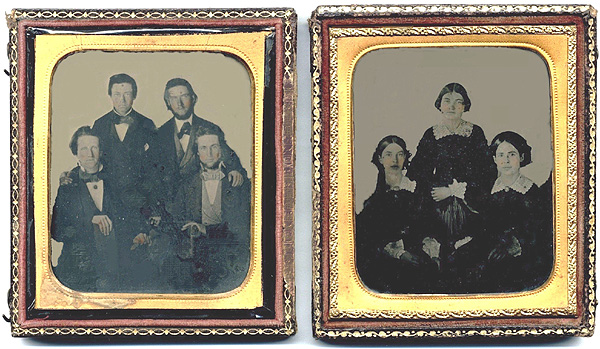
Lawrence University, Class of 1857 - Henry R. Colman's son, Henry Colman (born 1834) is seated at left; his son's future wife, Lucinda Darling is seated at right.

== Church career ==
He became a minister in 1831. In 1840, he and his family moved to Wisconsin where he was a missionary among the Oneida tribe near Green Bay, and later near Fond du Lac. He was a Methodist minister and one of the first settlers of the area that would become known as Appleton. He was commissioned by Amos Adams Lawrence to establish a frontier school and raise funds to build the school that would be known as Lawrence University. He also assisted in writing the charter of the university and was one of the first trustees of the university.

== Later years ==
Colman died February 7, 1895, in Fond du Lac, aged 94.
