= Rensselaer Morse Lewis =

American politician

Member of the Wisconsin State Assembly for Fond du Lac
- In office January 8, 1873 – March 20, 1873

Personal details
- Born: November 9, 1820 Morrisville, New York, U.S.
- Died: December 16, 1888 (aged 68) Fond du Lac, Wisconsin, U.S.
- Party: Liberal Reform Party
- Spouse: Helen Maria Williams (m. 1845)

Rensselaer Morse Lewis (November 9, 1820 – December 16, 1888) was an American merchant from Fond du Lac, Wisconsin, who served a single one-year term in 1873 as a Liberal Reform Party member of the Wisconsin State Assembly from Fond du Lac County, Wisconsin.

== Early life ==
Lewis was born November 9, 1820, in Morrisville, New York, the son of Conway Lewis and Adelia (née Curtis) Lewis. He received an academic education and became a grain merchant and wholesaler.

== Career ==
In 1853, he came to Wisconsin, settling in Fond du Lac. He was listed as a produce dealer in 1867. From 1867 to 1869 he served as postmaster of that city. He declared bankruptcy in 1868 and his home burned down in 1872.

=== Legislative service ===
In 1872, he was elected to serve in the 26th Wisconsin Legislature representing the 2nd Fond du Lac County Assembly district (consisting of the City of Fond du Lac itself, and the Towns of Fond du Lac, Lamartine and Oakfield) as a candidate of the newly formed Reform Party, with 1,754 votes to 1,725 for Republican incumbent Elihu Colman. Lewis was assigned to the standing committees on ways and means, and on engrossed bills.

He was not a candidate for re-election in 1873, and was succeeded by Democrat Thomas Weeks (the Reform Party had no candidate in the 1873 race).

== Personal life ==
On July 30, 1845, he was married to Helen Maria Williams (b. 1826). In 1859, his wife had her leg broken in a train accident aboard the Chicago and North Western Railway. Together, they were the parents of:

- Mary Elizabeth Lewis (b. 1846), who married Ephraim Leverett Patch
- Ella Marie Lewis (b. 1848), who married Kelsey M. Adams.
- Adelaide Olive Lewis (b. 1850), who married Harvey Bradford Dodd
- Carrie Williams Lewis (b. 1856), who married Fred W. Lebrick

Lewis died in Fond du Lac on December 16, 1888.
