= 1996 Oakfield tornado =

F5 tornado in Wisconsin, U.S.

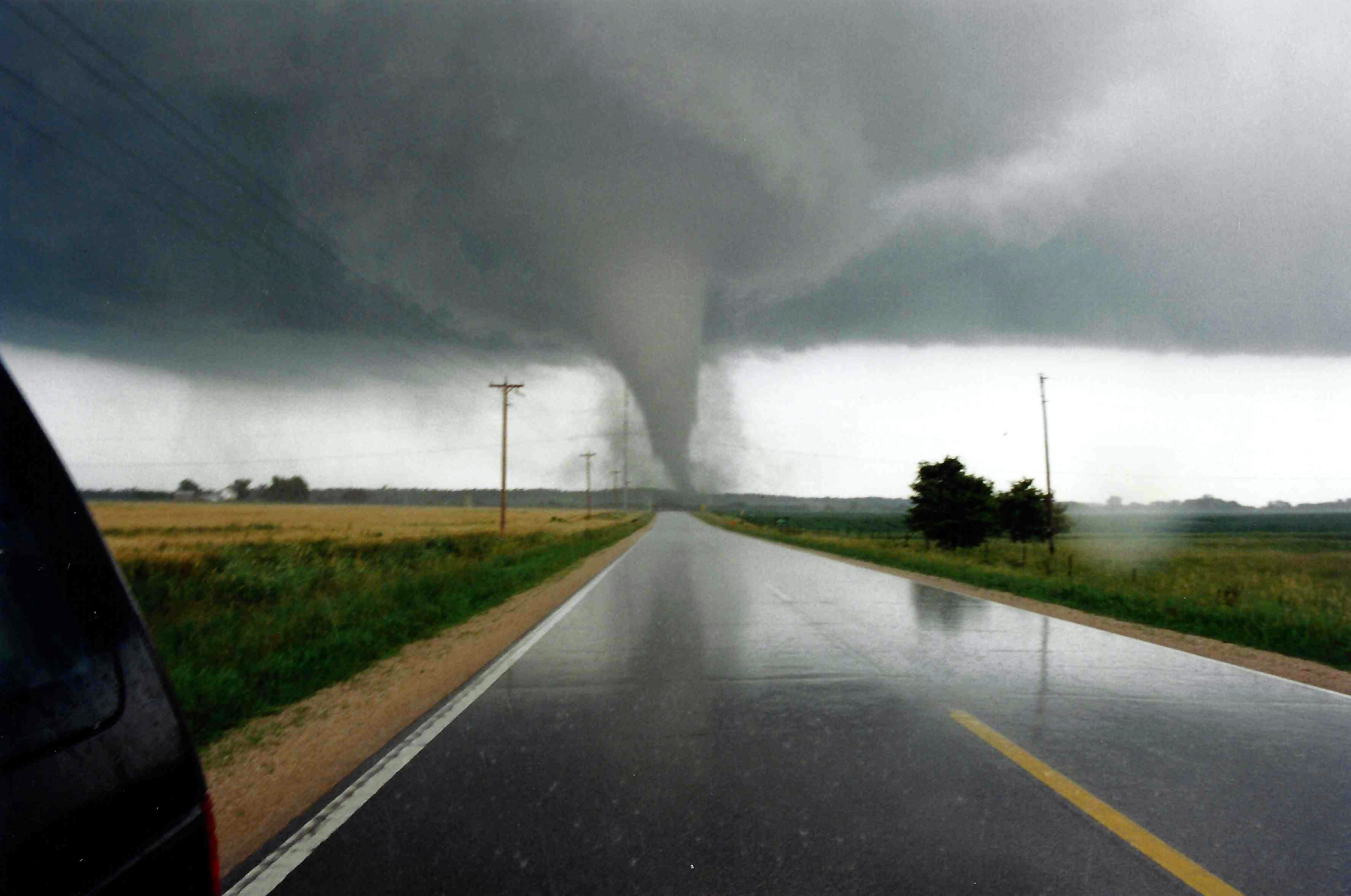
- Clockwise from top: The tornado shortly before crossing U.S. Route 151 west of Oakfield; A ground-level view of F3-F4 damage in the village of Oakfield; A radar scan of the parent supercell as the tornado passed through Oakfield

Meteorological history
- Formed: July 18, 1996; 7:05 p.m. CDT (UTC−05:00)
- Dissipated: July 18, 1996; 7:35 p.m. CDT (UTC−05:00)
- Duration: 30 minutes

F5 tornado
- on the Fujita scale
- Highest winds: 265 mph (426 km/h)

Overall effects
- Fatalities: 0
- Injuries: 12
- Damage: $40.4 million (1996 USD) $86.25 million (2026 USD)
- Houses destroyed: 60
- Part of the Tornadoes of 1996

During the late afternoon hours of July 18, 1996, a violent and highly destructive tornado directly struck the village of Oakfield, located in Fond Du Lac county in the U.S. state of Wisconsin. (Note: All damage totals are in 1996 United States dollars unless otherwise noted.) (Note: All times are listed in Central Daylight time unless otherwise noted.) The tornado was part of a localized tornado outbreak, which primarily affected the lower Fox Valley region of eastern Wisconsin, and was only one of two tornadoes in the outbreak to be rated as F2 or higher on the Fujita scale. (Note: An outbreak is generally defined as a group of at least six tornadoes (the number sometimes varies slightly according to local climatology) with no more than a six-hour gap between individual tornadoes. An outbreak sequence, prior to (after) modern records that began in 1950, is defined as, at most, two (one) consecutive days without at least one significant (F2 or stronger) tornado.) The tornado tracked for an estimated 13.3 miles (21.4 kilometers) across Fond Du Lac county, injuring 12 people and causing an estimated $40.4 million USD in damages.

The tornado touched down four miles west-northwest of Oakfield, where it caused minor damage to structures before intensifying to F3 strength as it approached Oakfield. The tornado further intensified to F4 strength as it directly struck the village. The tornado completely destroyed the Friday Canning Company before heavily damaging or destroying several homes and two churches in the village. The tornado narrowed in size as it reached F5 intensity around one to four miles east of Oakfield. The tornado swept four homes off of their foundations in this section of the tornadoes track, with automobiles being thrown up to 400 feet from their original location. The tornado then tracked northeastward, where the tornado further narrowed in size as well as weaken in intensity. The tornado then lifted around one mile northwest of Eden.

The tornado was later officially rated as F5 on the Fujita scale. As of 2026, this is the most recent officially rated violent (F4/EF4+) tornado to occur in Wisconsin, as well as being the second costliest tornado to strike the state un-adjusted.

== Meteorological synopsis ==
=== Synoptic setup ===
A surface analysis map at 7:00 pm CDT on July 18, 1996

On July 18, a developing surface-based low pressure system tracked across northern Wisconsin due to the presence of a nearby shifting weather boundary, known as a baroclinic zone. A warm front extended east across the Great Lakes, alongside a trailing cold front. These fronts displayed frontogenetic behavior, with frontogenesis at the 850 hPa level curving from the border of South Dakota and Nebraska to Wisconsin, leading to strong ascent in the warm sector of the surface low-pressure system, and becoming the primary lifting mechanism for storm development, with assistance from a trough out ahead. At 500mb, a 50-60 kt jet streak moved across central Wisconsin out of the west-northwest alongside a shortwave trough. The jet streak in combination with low-level winds moving out of the south-southwest at 10-15 kts, led to deep wind-shear of 50-65 kts where storms developed. Due to the dominant southerly wind patter, warm and moisture-laden air from the Gulf of Mexico flowed northward into the Upper Midwest. This in combination with the colder air mass aloft due to the mid-level trough, lead to surface based CAPE (Convective Available Potential Energy) reaching into the 4,000 J/kg range during the afternoon hours, with the main supercell thunderstorm developing on the nose of the instability axis. Due to a high convective inhibition (CIN) value caused by the presence of an elevated mixed layer (EML) and a 550 hPa inversion, early afternoon convection became difficult.

The Storm Prediction Center issued a Moderate Risk for severe weather across the Great Lakes region during the Day 1 convective outlook, primarily centered over Wisconsin and Michigan.

=== Event narrative ===
At 3:33 pm, a tornado watch was issued by the Storm Prediction Center for northeast Iowa, a small part of Minnesota, and a majority of Wisconsin. At 6:47 pm, a second tornado watch was issued to include the rest of far-eastern Wisconsin. The parent supercell thunderstorm that went on to produce the Oakfield tornado first developed in eastern Adams County. The first funnel cloud with the supercell was reported around 10 miles west of Berlin at 6:05 pm. The parent supercell produced its first tornado at 6:15 pm in St. Marie township in Green Lake County, however this tornado only produced damage to trees. The parent supercell produced hail-stones up to one inch in width near the town of Ripon in Fond Du Lac county at around 6:43 pm. Law enforcement reported the Oakfield tornado around one mile east-southeast of Lagoda, and at around 7:09 pm, the National Weather Service in Milwaukee/Sullivan issued a tornado warning for Fond Du Lac county shortly after the tornado touched down.

== Tornado summary ==
The debris filled tornado as it tore through the village of Oakfield

At 7:05 pm, the tornado touched down four miles west-northwest of the village of Oakfield. The tornado exhibited multiple-vortex characteristics early on in its life as it produced minor damage to homes along Dehring Road shortly after touchdown. The tornado crossed U.S. Route 151 before damaging residences and farms along Prairie Road. Around 6-8 minutes prior to the tornado entering Oakfield, tornado sirens in the village were activated. The tornado intensified to F3 strength as it approached Oakfield, with homes and outbuildings along Prairie Street to the northwest of the village sustaining significant damage.

At 7:15 pm, the tornado struck the village of Oakfield at F4 intensity, first striking the Friday Canning Company along the Wild Goose State Trail and South Elm Street. The canning company building was almost completely leveled by the tornado, with millions of empty cans from the factory being thrown up to 50 miles away by the tornado. The tornado began to track eastward along Filbey Street, where it devastated several homes, often only leaving behind piles of debris. The Oakfield Middle School had its roof structure peeled off, with the interior of the school sustaining significant damage, and the recently remodeled Methodist Church was completely destroyed. Trees along Filbey street were ripped out of the ground, many of which had their trunks and large branches thrown through the windows and doors of nearby structures. Structures and trees on Main Street, Gilson Avenue, and 2nd Street sustained a similar degree of damage, with houses being reduced to rubble, a gas station being completely destroyed, tree trunks being snapped, and vehicles being crushed and overturned. St. Luke's Lutheran Church on 2nd Street was completely destroyed, with the only section left standing being the hallway to the restrooms, alongside a portrait of Jesus. 10 elderly people were in the church basement at the time; none were injured. Residents in Oakfield reported difficulty popping ears as the tornado tracked through the village. A dog named Muffet was killed in the village when a basement wall collapsed onto them.

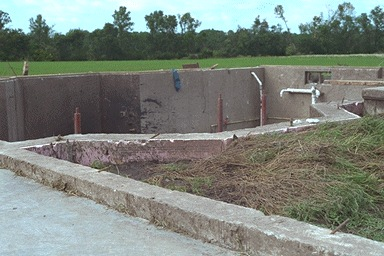
An anchor-bolted home along River Road that was swept clean by the tornado

After the tornado left Oakfield, it intensified further to F5 strength as it struck homes along River Road. Five homes were severely damaged, and two were completely destroyed. One home along River Road was completely swept off its foundation, with anchor bolts bent. Two vehicles in the area were heavily damaged and were thrown a distance of 400 feet (120 metres). The core width of the tornado was estimated to be 150–200 yards (140–180 metres) in diameter, with secondary damage extending to 400 yards. The tornado carved through groves of trees before completely sweeping a home along Church Road. The tornado then damaged or destroyed two homes north of Church Road and east of Hickory Road; in one home, parts of a fireplace collapsed into the basement, injuring one of the occupants. The home adjacent to this was totaled. The tornado continued to track eastward, carving a path through groves of trees before completely destroying Tom Kelroy's home off of Highway 175 and tossing a vehicle across the highway. As the tornado approached Interstate 41, it began to leave burn marks in corn fields, in addition to reducing corn crops down to stubbles 1–4 inches (2.5–10.2 centimetres) in height. The tornado began to take a northeastward turn as it weakened and shrunk in size rapidly, damaging a farm home along Kelly Road. The tornado remained over rural farmland for the rest of its life before lifting around 1 mile (1.6 kilometres) northwest of Eden at 7:35 pm.

== Impact and aftermath ==
An aerial view of Oakfield after the tornado

In total, the Oakfield tornado completely destroyed 60 homes, six businesses, 18 barns, and multiple sheds, alongside an additional 130 homes and businesses. Around 500 acres of crops were completely wiped out, resulting in the total damages from the tornado reaching $40.4 million USD. Debris from Oakfield was found to the east along the shoreline of Lake Michigan, and cancelled checks were found as far away as Muskegon, Michigan, around 125 miles east-southeast of Oakfield. The tornado was initially rated as F3, before later being upgraded to F5 on the Fujita scale, with estimated winds up to 265 mph (426 km/h). As of 2026, the Oakfield tornado remains the most recent violent (F4/EF4+) tornado to impact the state of Wisconsin. 12 people were injured by the tornado, and one dog was killed. Eight of the 12 people who were injured were taken to Waupun Memorial Hospital, with the hospital issuing an external disaster alert at 7:20 pm, which remained in effect until 11:15 pm. The most common injury among patients was fractures and lacerations. Four of the eight admitted to hospital were released on July 19.

After the tornado, Wisconsin Governor Tommy Thompson declared a state of emergency, resulting in the National Guard being deployed to aid victims and clear debris. Governor Thompson also requested president Bill Clinton to declare Fond du Lac and Green counties federal disaster areas to allow victims of both the tornadoes and floods to be eligible for federal assistance, and on August 2, a disaster declaration was issued by President Clinton. On August 30, FEMA approved $1.4 million USD in aid to state and local governments to repair roads, bridges, and other public buildings in Oakfield and Green County, however assistance for individual victims was denied, stating that there wasn't enough damage to homes and businesses in the two counties that weren't covered by insurance to be eligible for federal help. In a letter to Governor Thompson from William C. Tidball, it was stated that only one tornado-damaged home was uninsured, with only six more being underinsured by 15% or greater.

The Salvation Army and Fond du Lac County Red Cross set up an emergency shelter at the Oakfield High School before launching a disaster fund campaign called "Help Can't Wait", with the goal for relief being $150,000. Donations quickly allowed the Red Cross to provide more than 6,300 meals to tornado victims and emergency workers by July 23, with Mercury Marine donating $25,000. The Salvation Army was reportedly overwhelmed by the number of donations of non-perishable foods, clothing, and furniture, and on July 24, the organization asked people to stop sending donations of these items temporarily, instead requesting provisions of cleaning supplies and personal care products. Fond du Lac's Church of Christ handed out free food and beverages to volunteers and victims. The Bank of Oakfield designated an estimated $1 million USD in loans for victims, and the Brownsville-Lomira small animal clinic donated pet food to victims. The Oakfield Area Tree Council was formed shortly after the tornado by residents to repair ecological damage in the village. Between various donations and fundraisers, a total of $102,000 USD was raised, and over 1,400 trees were planted.

The 25th anniversary of the tornado was observed on July 18, 2021, with a series of commemorative events being held, including a parade, barbecue, outdoor church service, village-wide open houses, and the Oakfield Public Library's story walk, which featured both displays of photographs and first-hand accounts of the tornado in Acorn Park.

== Non-tornadic effects and other tornadoes ==
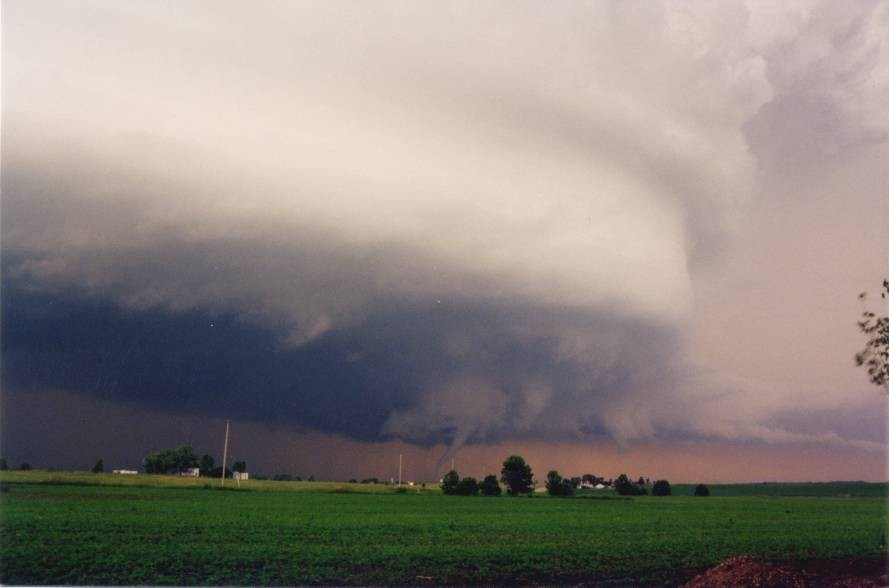
An F1 tornado produced by the same parent supercell as the Oakfield tornado near Port Washington, Wisconsin

The outbreak caused one fatality, 15 injuries (including two non-tornadic), an estimated $47.5 million USD in property damage, and an additional $7.8 million USD in crop damage in Wisconsin. In addition to the tornadoes, hail-stones greater than one inch in width were reported in six counties. The largest hail reported was up to two and a half inches in width; this being the hail that fell in Oakfield around five minutes prior to the tornado striking the village.

Flash flooding was also a prominent disaster during the outbreak, being responsible $6.5 million USD in property damage, as well as $6.1 million USD in crop damage. The village of Browntown and the city of Monroe in Green County experienced the most severe flooding as rainfall in the area ranged from 10–13.5 in (25–34 cm), causing floodwaters along Highway 11 to reach up to four feet in depth. A bridge on Highway 11 was washed away as businesses in Monroe experienced significant damage due flood surges. Three homes in Monroe sustained major damage alongside several others which experienced basement flooding. One woman in Monroe was injured when floodwaters swept her off her feet. Areas of the Pecatonica River near Martintown remained above flood stage until July 24, 1996, with the river cresting at 16.12 feet (4.91 metres) on July 20. Flash flooding also struck the villages of Blanchardville and Argyle in Lafayette county.

In the town of New London in Outagamie County, a lightning strike injured a 23 year old man, who was rushed to the hospital. Lightning also caused around $1 thousand USD in damage to a wooden pole barn near Manchester.

=== Other tornadoes ===
A total of at least 12 tornadoes touched down in the United States on July 18, 1996, all of them within Wisconsin, including the Oakfield tornado. The first tornado struck north-central Wisconsin, with the remaining 11 striking eastern Wisconsin. A majority of these tornadoes were weak and rated as F0 or F1 on the Fujita scale, with only one other tornado besides the Oakfield tornado to be rated as F2 or higher during the outbreak. The outbreaks sole fatality was caused by an F2 tornado in Marytown.

List of confirmed tornadoes on July 18, 1996
F#	Location	County / Parish	Time (UTC)	Path length
F1	S of Tomahawk	Lincoln	2220	3 miles (4.8 km)
F1	A tornado touched down within Bradley Park, uprooting two trees before crossing Lake Mohawkskin, where two boats were flipped. The tornado then tore a section of the roofing structure off of a tavern, and the entire roof structure off of a nearby house. A garage was completely removed from its foundation, however a lawnmower inside was left untouched. The tornado then impacted the Road Lake area, where the tornado uprooted several trees, causing them to fall onto three cottages. The tornado produced an estimated $90 thousand USD in damages.			
F1	NW of Green Lake	Green Lake	2315	2 miles (3.2 km)
F1	A tornado touched down within a wooded area in St. Marie township. Tornado damage was confined to trees along its two miles path before the tornado lifted over the Fox River. This was the first tornado produced by the Oakfield supercell.			
F2	S of Jericho to Marytown to W of St. Anna	Calumet, Fond du Lac	0005	4.4 miles (7.1 km)
F2	1 death – After producing a tornadic waterspout over Lake Winnebago northwest of Oshkosh, the parent supercell thunderstorm cycled and produced a strong tornado that touched down in Calumet County around 1.1 miles south of Jericho. The tornado tracked in a southeastward direction where it struck a farm. A calf house at the farm was picked up by the tornado and thrown over one thousand feet, and both trees and crops were heavily damaged. The tornado then crossed into Fond du Lac county, where the tornado proceeded to damage several barns, homes, and sheds, as well as uproot several large trees as it continued on a southeastward track. The tornado then struck the north side of Marytown, where a mobile home, a machine shed, and three homes were completely destroyed. An 81 year old man was killed in Marytown after the tornado destroyed his home. The tornado crossed back into Calumet County where it damaged a barn before lifting around 1.8 miles west of St. Anna. The tornado produced an estimated $300 thousand USD in damages, and injured one additional person.			
F0	Marytown	Fond du Lac	0007	1.2 miles (1.9 km)
F0	A weak tornado touched down west-northwest of Marytown and tracked eastward. Tornado damage remained confined to crops before the tornado lifted around half a mile north of Marytown.			
F0	S of Charlesburg	Calumet	0010	0.1 miles (0.16 km)
F0	A weak and short-lived tornado touched down south of Charlesburg. The tornado moved over a squad car, causing the vehicle to violently shake before flattening crops in two fields.			
F0	Oakfield	Fond du Lac	0025	0.6 miles (0.97 km)
F0	Around 10 minutes after the F5 tornado moved through Oakfield, another tornado touched down within the village. The tornado had tracked across the same areas affected by the first tornado, only picking up previous debris before lifting on the eastern sides of the village.			
F0	NW of Fond du Lac	Fond du Lac	0027	0.2 miles (0.32 km)
F0	A weak and short-lived tornado touched down just east of Eldorado Marsh State Park, causing crop damage as well as damage to a barn and machine shed. The tornado produced an estimated $200 thousand USD in damages.			
F0	NE of Lomira	Fond du Lac	0055	0.1 miles (0.16 km)
F0	A weak and short-lived tornado touched down northeast of Lomira. The tornado flattened a portion of a field south of Campbell Road and west of Hilltop Road. The tornado produced an estimated $75 thousand USD in damages.			
F1	S of Beechwood	Sheboygan	0110	0.9 miles (1.4 km)
F1	A short-lived tornado touched down 1.8 miles south-southwest of Beechwood. The tornado then damaged several homes and a few bars, as well as flatten some crops before lifting two miles south of Beechwood. The tornado produced an estimated $250.2 thousand USD in damages.			
F1	NW of Fredonia to Lake Michigan	Ozaukee	0118	7.6 miles (12.2 km)
F1	After producing the Oakfield tornado, the parent supercell thunderstorm produced another tornado that touched down around one miles north-northwest of Fredonia and began tracking southeastward. The tornado then "skipped" to around 0.6 miles south of Holy Cross, where the tornado intensified to F1 strength. The tornado destroyed four barns, three machine sheds, and one garage, as well as damage an additional six homes, one barn, three machine sheds, and one garage. Several vehicles were also damaged or destroyed by the tornado alongside an estimated 500 acres of crops. The tornado then moved over Lake Michigan where it tracked for an additional two miles before lifting. The tornado produced an estimated $530 thousand USD in damages.			
F0	NE of Port Washington	Ozaukee	0128	0.8 miles (1.3 km)
F0	A weak tornado touched down around 1.6 miles east of Port Washington/Didier Field airport and tracked southeastward. The tornado produced no significant damage before moving over Lake Michigan, where it tracked for an additional 1.3 miles before lifting.			
Sources:The Storm Data Publication for July 1996 and NCEI
