= Tornado outbreak sequence of April 1996 =

Weather event in the United States and Canada

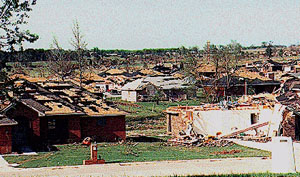
- Tornado damage in Fort Smith, Arkansas

Meteorological history
- Duration: April 19–21, 1996

Tornado outbreak
- Tornadoes: 118
- Max. rating: F3 tornado
- Duration: 3 days

Overall effects
- Fatalities: 6
- Injuries: 200+
- Areas affected: Eastern United States, Oklahoma, Arkansas, Ontario, Quebec

The tornado outbreak sequence of April 1996 was a series of tornado outbreaks that occurred across a large area of eastern North America over a three-day period between April 19 and April 21, 1996. A total of 118 tornadoes touched down in the Great Lakes, Midwest and Southeast region over the three-day period, killing six people and becoming the most notable outbreaks of the year.

The 19th was the most prolific tornado outbreak in Illinois history with 33 tornadoes touching down across the state, breaking the old record of 25 set on August 10, 1974. This outbreak can also be compared to the May 2004 tornado outbreak sequence as it was a very large, deep, and vigorous system. The same system produced tornadoes in Ontario on the 20th and destructive tornadoes in Oklahoma, Arkansas, and Texas on the 21st.

== Meteorological synopsis ==
=== April 19 ===
The outbreak occurred when the warm front of a deep storm system moved north and east out of Missouri. April 19 started off cool and skies were overcast ahead of the warm front. Meteorologists were trying to figure out if the warm front would move into Illinois that afternoon. As the day wore on, temperatures warmed, dew points rose, and thunderstorms started to explode in Iowa during the mid-afternoon hours. Although there were some doubts on specifics, the potential significance of the outbreak was rather foreseeable, with storm chasers traveling from the Great Plains and the Storm Prediction Center issuing a high risk early on.

==== Illinois ====
A total of 33 tornadoes hit Illinois before spreading west and south into Missouri, and Iowa and east and north into Wisconsin, Michigan, and Indiana on Friday, April 19. The town of Decatur was hit by a large F3 tornado, as were the towns of Urbana and Ogden. Major damage and injuries occurred in all three locations, and one person was killed in Ogden.

==== Indiana ====
In Indiana, 21 tornadoes were produced as the cold front moved into the area during the evening hours. Temperatures had warmed well into the 70's and lower 80's (20 to 26 °C) before the storms hit. Five people were injured in Morgan County.

=== April 20 ===
One of Canada's most prolific tornado events struck Ontario.

A vigorous branch of the jet stream from the Pacific Ocean combined with rich low-level moisture kept the storm system rolling, spinning off more tornadoes in the Southeast. One tornado hit Carroll County, Mississippi, killing teenager Dexter Forman when a tree fell on his mobile home. Another tornado did massive damage to Berea, Kentucky, but no one was killed.

=== April 21 ===
A final tornado was produced by the first system in southern Quebec. The outbreak across the south-central U.S. on the 21st was produced by a different weather system. Several tornadoes raked through eastern Oklahoma and western Arkansas that Sunday evening and Monday morning, killing a father and son in St. Paul, Arkansas as well as two children in Fort Smith. Shortly after the outbreak, the local CBS affiliate in Fort Smith, Arkansas, KFSM-TV, produced Sunday's Fury, a video production outlining the sequence of events, including the tornado siren failure from downed phone lines that the system relied upon, that surrounded the Fort Smith tornado that day. The tornado that struck Fort Smith was a half-mile wide and hit portions of the city's Garrison Avenue and neighborhoods on both sides of the Arkansas River.

== Confirmed tornadoes ==
Confirmed tornadoes by Fujita rating
FU	F0	F1	F2	F3	F4	F5	Total
0	56	33	18	11	0	0	118

=== April 19 event ===
F#	Location	County	Time (UTC)	Path length	Damage
Illinois
F0	N of Mattoon	Coles	2120	0.1 mile (0.16 km)	Brief tornado with no damage.
F0	N of Fairgrange	Coles	2135	0.1 mile (0.16 km)	Brief tornado with no damage.
F1	NW of Paris (1st tornado)	Edgar	2210	2 miles (3.2 km)	Machine sheds, barns, and grain bins were destroyed. One house was damaged. Six farms in the area were also affected.
F0	NW of Paris (2nd tornado)	Edgar	2212	1 mile (1.6 km)	A machine shed was destroyed while another shed, a garage, and a baseball field were all damaged.
F1	Rutland area	LaSalle	2240	0.5 mile (0.8 km)	A large building, a house, and a garage were damaged.
F0	SW of Winchester	Scott	2244	2 miles (3.2 km)	A tree fell onto a car.
F0	NE of Valmeyer	Monroe	2245	1 mile (1.6 km)	Damage was limited to trees.
F0	W of Raritan	Henderson	2300	5 miles (8 km)	Caused minor damage. Most of the damage occurred when a second tornado hit the same area later that evening.
F2	S of Havana	Mason	2307	9 miles (14.4 km)	Two trailers and some farm buildings were destroyed. One house had major damage, and eleven others had minor damage. A “semi-truck” was blown off the road and into a field, and a number of trees were knocked down. One person was injured during the storm.
F1	E of Raritan	Henderson	2310	3.5 miles (5.6 km)	Fifteen houses, a barn, and some outbuildings were damaged. At one farm, three grain bins and some irrigation equipment were either heavily damaged or destroyed.
F0	Brimfield area	Peoria	2310	4 miles (6.4 km)	Minor damage to a church and a business. A van was pushed sideways into bushes, and some trees were damaged.
F1	Easton	Mason	2317	9 miles (14.4 km)	Two houses were destroyed and five others sustained major damage. The high school was also damaged. A barn and a house were both lifted off of their foundations.
F2	E of Jacksonville	Morgan	2318	6 miles (9.6 km)	One house was destroyed, and some farm buildings were either damaged or destroyed. Two guard towers, one greenhouse, and some fencing at a prison were damaged. A chemical plant sustained damage, and two nearby railroad cars were overturned.
F0	Freeburg	St. Clair	2320	1.5 miles (2.4 km)	Caused damage to trees and power lines.
F0	N of Dickeys	Kankakee	2325	4 miles (6.4 km)	Caused minor damage to farm buildings.
F0	W of Island Grove	Morgan	2331	0.1 mile (0.16 km)	Brief tornado with no damage.
F0	NE of New Berlin	Sangamon	2332	4 miles (6.4 km)	Three houses, a barn, and a machine shed were all damaged. Two “semi-trucks” were blown over on Interstate 72.
F3	E of Armington	Logan, Tazewell, McLean	2358	9.4 miles (15 km)	Two houses, a church, and several outbuildings were destroyed while 15 other houses were damaged. In addition, some barns, farm equipment, trees, and grain bins were damaged or destroyed.
F0	W of Chester	Randolph	0000	1.5 miles (2.4 km)	Utility sheds and trees were destroyed.
F3	Bishop Hill/Galva	Henry	0000	3.5 miles (5.6 km)	At least 150 houses were damaged; of those, 26 sustained major damage and 15 were beyond repair. In addition, Galva's sewage treatment plant was heavily damaged. Four people were injured.
F0	Momence	Kankakee	0001	5 miles (8 km)	Two houses had roof damage.
F0	Galva	Henry	0010	1 mile (1.6 km)	Gravestones at a cemetery were pushed over.
F3	Decatur	Macon	0022	14.5 miles (23.2 km)	At least eight - possibly ten - houses were destroyed and several others were damaged. In addition, a church, a grain silo, and the Sims Lumber Company were destroyed while a school gymnasium and several buildings at a manufacturing plant were damaged. Twenty-nine people were injured, and total damages were estimated at $9 million.
F2	Salem	Marion	0035	20 miles (32 km)	Several buildings at the County Fairgrounds, eight mobile homes, and two houses were destroyed while 46 other houses and mobile homes as well as 23 businesses were damaged. Two-ton trucks were turned 180 degrees by the tornado. Seven people were injured, and total damages were estimated at $7 million.
F0	NW of Tiskilwa	Bureau	0040	0.1 mile (0.16 km)	Damage was limited to a utility pole.
F1	S of Milmine	Piatt	0055	0.3 mile (0.5 km)	A grain bin was destroyed while houses, cars, and trees were damaged. Trucks were overturned, and a grain auger was thrown over a set of railroad tracks.
F0	SW of Baldwin	Randolph	0059	2 miles (3.2 km)	Caused damage to trees and power lines.
F1	S of Monticello	Piatt	0100	2 miles (3.2 km)	Two houses were destroyed and one other house was damaged. A church and a machine shed also sustained damage. At a nearby airport, three single engine planes, two gliders, and a hangar were destroyed.
F1	Greendale	Marion, Clay	0105	5 miles (8 km)	A farmhouse, barn, and other farm buildings were destroyed. Trees and power lines were knocked down.
F0	S of Tilden	Randolph	0112	3 miles (4.8 km)	Damage to trees and power lines.
F0	NW of Breman	Randolph	0115	2 miles (3.2 km)	Houses and barns sustained roof damage. Trees and power lines were brought down by the storm.
F1	W of Mulkeytown	Perry, Franklin	0120	2.5 miles (4 km)	A church, a house, and trees were damaged while some outbuildings were destroyed. A tractor-trailer was overturned.
F1	Vernon	Fayette, Marion	0120	11.5 miles (18.4 km)	Three barns, several sheds, and a house were destroyed.
F3	Urbana	Champaign	0134	4 miles (6.4 km)	A total of 33 houses were destroyed while 83 other houses and five businesses sustained minor to moderate damage. Twelve people were injured, and damage was estimated at $9 million.
F3	Ogden	Champaign	0155	2 miles (3.2 km)	1 death - Major damage throughout most of Ogden. A total of 68 houses, 12 businesses, three churches, and a library were destroyed. The town’s elementary school was heavily damaged. Twenty businesses and 179 houses showed major or minor damage. A woman in a “semi-truck” was killed when the tornado crossed I-74, and 13 others were injured.
F0	NW of Catlin	Vermilion	0208	0.1 mile (0.16 km)	Brief touchdown with no damage.
F3	NE of Frisco to SW of Barnhill	Jefferson, Hamilton, Wayne	0215	17 miles (27.2 km)	Three houses were destroyed and 50 others sustained moderate to severe damage. At least 45 outbuildings and barns as well as 60 (as many as 70) grain bins were either damaged or destroyed. The town of Piopolis was devastated; however, there were no fatalities or injuries reported.
F1	N of Carmi	White	0230	1 mile (1.6 km)	Ten hangars, eight planes, and an automobile were destroyed at the airport. A church was also damaged.
F2	Zion	Lake	0432	2 miles (3.2 km)	A total of 400 houses and businesses were damaged with 32 sustaining major damage. Five trucks were overturned, and trees were blown down. Two people were injured.
Missouri
F0	NE of Bloomsdale	Ste. Genevieve	0000	0.3 mile (0.5 km)	Damage was limited to trees.
F0	SE of Mine La Motte	Madison	0210	0.3 mile (0.5 km)	Brief touchdown with no damage.
F3	Perryville	Perry	0230	11.5 miles (18.4 km)	A total of 13 houses were destroyed and 68 others were damaged including five with major damage. Six businesses and 69 outbuildings were damaged or destroyed.
F2	S of Doniphan	Ripley	0300	10 miles (16 km)	A mobile home was overturned. Trees fell on houses and cars.
F2	NW of Poplar Bluff	Butler	0305	2.5 miles (4 km)	Numerous barns and utility poles were destroyed while houses, hay balers, and farm equipment were all damaged. Grain bins and other items were carried some distance.
F1	N of Bernie	Stoddard	0403	0.6 mile (1 km)	A house trailer was destroyed and several houses were damaged. Two schools and a grocery store sustained roof damage.
Texas
F0	W of Pidcoke	Coryell	0030	0.1 mile (0.16 km)	Several barns were destroyed.
F2	N of Commerce	Hunt	0038	0.5 mile (0.8 km)	Two mobile homes were destroyed. Trees, power lines, and two houses were damaged.
Indiana
F1	Landersdale	Morgan, Johnson	0040	5 miles (8 km)	Six buildings were destroyed, and 50 others were damaged. Four people were injured.
F1	SW of Burr Oak	Marshall	0150	1 mile (1.6 km)	Farm buildings were damaged, and power lines were downed.
F1	SE of Plymouth	Marshall	0205	1 mile (1.6 km)	A mobile home was damaged and a truck was overturned.
F0	N of Milford	Kosciusko	0252	0.1 mile (0.16 km)	Brief touchdown with no damage.
F0	NW of Emison	Knox	0315	1 mile (1.6 km)	A pole barn was destroyed, and two train cars were blown over.
F2	SW of Yankeetown	Warrick	0440	2 miles (3.2 km)	Two mobile homes were destroyed, and several buildings at a manufacturing plant were damaged. Five railroad box cars were overturned, and two metal culverts were lifted.
F2	W of Arthur	Pike	0442	0.8 mile (1.3 km)	One house was destroyed and ten others sustained minor to moderate damage. Also, as many as 15 barns and small sheds were reported as destroyed.
F0	NW of Heltonville	Lawrence	0457	1 mile (1.6 km)	Several houses were damaged and numerous trees were downed.
F0	E of Freetown	Jackson	0505	1 mile (1.6 km)	
F1	SW of Burnsville	Bartholomew	0545	1 mile (1.6 km)	Damage to several farm buildings and a transmission tower.
F0	Westport	Decatur	0555	0.1 mile (0.16 km)	Several farm buildings were destroyed while the South Decatur High School sustained damage. A transmission tower was also blown down.
F1	E of Harris City	Decatur	0601	1.2 miles (1.9 km)	Several buildings were damaged or destroyed.
F2	NW of Greenville	Floyd	0608	1 mile (1.6 km)	Six houses were damaged, and some mobile homes were overturned.
Iowa
F0	Preston	Jackson	0117	0.1 mile (0.16 km)	Damage to trees and power lines.
F0	S of Preston	Clinton	0117	0.2 mile (0.32 km)	One house had roof damage.
Kentucky
F1	Mount Washington	Bullitt	0640	1 mile (1.6 km)	118 houses were damaged, with three houses and two mobile homes completely destroyed.
Source: Tornado History Project - April 19, 1996 Storm Data, NCDC Storm Data

=== April 20 event ===
F#	Location	County	Time (UTC)	Path length	Damage
Kentucky
F1	SW of Goodnight	Barren	0830	0.5 mile (0.8 km)	A mobile home was swept away, injuring four people.
F1	E of Hiseville	Barren, Metcalfe	0834	4 miles (6.4 km)	A church was heavily damaged, and two trailers as well as several barns were destroyed. Other unknown property damage occurred.
F0	S of Pierce	Green	0845	3 miles (4.8 km)	Several barns were destroyed, and utility poles were snapped.
F2	NW of Geneva to NE of Preachersville	Lincoln	0926	12 miles (18.4 km)	Twenty houses and mobile homes, six businesses, a church, and two show pavilions at the county fairgrounds were all destroyed. One house was picked up and slammed into the ground 50–100 feet away. Seven people were injured.
F1	SW of Quail	Rockcastle, Pulaski	0928	2 miles (3.2 km)	Barns, trees, and houses were hit. A church steeple was also toppled. Many trees were downed with some of them falling onto and damaging houses. A flying trailer knocked out power lines and landed on a mobile home.
F1	N of Ottawa	Garrard	0930	6 miles (9.6 km)	A dozen barns were destroyed, and six cows were killed.
F2	Berea	Madison	0945	2 miles (3.2 km)	At least 800 homes were damaged, and 35 of them were completely destroyed or heavily damaged. Forty businesses were damaged; of those, 26 businesses were severely damaged or destroyed. A storage tank was also toppled into a plant producing equipment for space shuttles. A tourist center was also damaged. Ten people were injured, and damage was estimated at close to $13 million.
F1	Wagersville	Estill	0955	5 miles (8 km)	At least 40 houses and 20 barns were damaged with three of the houses and 12 of the barns sustaining significant damage. Farm machinery was also damaged.
Tennessee
F2	SE of Barnesville	Lawrence	1145	0.5 mile (0.8 km)	One house lost its roof, and 12 people were injured.
F2	SE of Summertown	Lawrence	1150	1 mile (1.6 km)	At least 25 houses were damaged, and two of those houses sustained severe damage.
F2	N of Lynnville	Giles	1156	1 mile (1.6 km)	A brick structure was damaged, and a mobile home was leveled.
F2	W of Cornersville	Marshall	1203	1.5 miles (2.4 km)	Seven mobile homes were destroyed, and 10 others were damaged.
Mississippi
F1	W of Winona	Carroll	1340	6 miles (9.6 km)	1 death - A pump house was destroyed while a veterinary clinic, a barn, a cabin, trees, and a church were all damaged. The fatality occurred when a tree fell onto a mobile home.
Alabama
F0	Birmingham	Jefferson	1709	0.3 mile (0.5 km)	Some minor structural damage occurred, and trees were downed.
North Carolina
F0	SE of Sugar Hill	McDowell	1750	0.1 mile (0.16 km)	Roof was partially removed from a house.
F1	SE of Boone	Watauga	1800	0.1 mile (0.16 km)	Sixteen vehicles at an amusement park were damaged, and one person was injured.
Texas
F1	Timpson	Shelby	2115	5 miles (8 km)	Two trailers were destroyed, and both trees and power lines were downed.
Louisiana
F0	SW of Kingston	De Soto	2145	0.5 mile (0.8 km)	Damage was limited to trees.
Ontario
F3	SW of Williamsford to NE of Blantyre	Grey	2350	25 miles (40 km)	See article on this tornado
F3	SW of Arthur to E of Violet Hill	Wellington, Dufferin	0010	37.5 miles (60 km)	See article on this tornado
F0	SW of Orillia	Simcoe	unknown	unknown	See article on this tornado
Source: Tornado History Project - April 20, 1996 Storm Data, Southern Ontario Tornadoes of 1996, NCDC Storm Data

=== April 21 event ===
F#	Location	County	Time (UTC)	Path length	Damage
Quebec
F0	Ormstown	Le Haut-Saint-Laurent	unknown	unknown	
Oklahoma
F0	NE of Perry	Noble	2200	2 miles (3.2 km)	Brief touchdown with no damage.
F1	NE of Ratliff City	Carter	2242	0.5 mile (0.8 km)	Power poles, outbuildings, and trees were damaged.
F1	W of Healdton	Jefferson, Carter	2330	4.5 miles (7.2 km)	A mobile home was damaged, and windows were blown out of other houses.
F0	SE of Fox	Carter	2335	0.1 mile (0.16 km)	Brief touchdown with no damage.
F0	NW of Wilson	Carter	2335	0.1 mile (0.16 km)	Brief touchdown with no damage.
F0	N of Oil City	Carter	2345	2.5 miles (4 km)	Weak tornado with no damage.
F0	SE of Chigley	Murray	2351	0.1 mile (0.16 km)	Brief touchdown with no damage.
F1	N of Barnsdall	Osage	0000	0.5 mile (0.8 km)	
F0	SE of Davis	Murray	0025	1 mile (1.6 km)	One house had roof damage, and a mobile home was blown off its foundation.
F1	NW of Sulphur	Murray	0028	3 miles (4.8 km)	A church, a number of houses, an apartment complex, and a restaurant were damaged. Outbuildings, radio antennas and trees were destroyed. At least homes had minor to major damage.
F0	NW of Nowata	Nowata	0028	0.1 mile (0.16 km)	
F0	NW of Scullin (1st tornado)	Murray	0049	0.5 mile (0.8 km)	Damage to barns and silos.
F0	NW of Scullin (2nd tornado)	Murray	0050	0.5 mile (0.8 km)	Damage to barns and silos.
F1	W of Fairland	Ottawa	0115	0.1 mile (0.16 km)	
F3	Fort Smith, Arkansas	Sequoyah (OK), Sebastian (AR), Crawford (AR)	0212	10.1 miles (16.2 km)	2 deaths - Nearly 500 houses and 246 apartment units were destroyed, 620 other houses had major damage, and another 1,275 houses showed minor damage. Ninety-eight businesses were damaged or destroyed. The downtown business district of Fort Smith was devastated near the Garrison Avenue Bridge. Homes were also destroyed in Van Buren. A two-year-old girl and five-year-old boy were both killed when their houses (about three blocks apart) collapsed on them during the storm. At least 40 others were injured. The National Weather Service reported damages in excess of $300 million.
F0	McAlester	Pittsburg	0215	3 miles (4.8 km)	
F1	NE of Richville	Pittsburg	0230	5 miles (8 km)	
F1	NE of Lewisville	Haskell	0300	1 mile (1.6 km)	
Texas
F0	E of Sunset	Montague	0125	0.1 mile (0.16 km)	Power lines were blown down.
F0	NE of Bowie	Montague	0130	0.1 mile (0.16 km)	Brief touchdown with no damage.
F0	NW of Gainesville	Cooke	0200	2 miles (3.2 km)	Two barns were destroyed, and trees were damaged.
F0	NW of Lindsay	Cooke	0205	2 miles (3.2 km)	The siding on several houses was damaged. Significant tree damage was also reported.
F0	S of Gainesville	Cooke	0220	0.1 mile (0.16 km)	Brief touchdown with no damage.
F0	SW of Dixie	Grayson	0233	1 mile (1.6 km)	A barn was destroyed, and trees were damaged.
F0	W of Denison	Grayson	0307	0.1 mile (0.16 km)	Damage to trees and power lines.
F0	NW of Lindsay (2nd tornado)	Cooke	0325	1 mile (1.6 km)	A fence was destroyed, and trees were damaged.
F0	NW of Dixie	Grayson	0358	2 miles (3.2 km)	A barn was destroyed, and trees were damaged.
F0	SE of Locust	Grayson	0440	2 miles (3.2 km)	Trees and power lines were damaged.
Missouri
F0	S of Seymour	Webster	0430	2 miles (3.2 km)	A garage and a barn were destroyed.
Arkansas
F2	S of Fern	Franklin	0455	3 miles (4.8 km)	Seven houses were destroyed, and several other buildings were damaged. Numerous trees were also downed. Two people were injured.
F3	SW of Dutton to SW of Weathers	Madison	0515	15 miles (24 km)	2 deaths - Worst damage occurred near St. Paul. Eight houses and a mobile home were destroyed; in addition, a church was damaged. Six people were injured.
F2	NE of Yellville	Marion	0640	12 miles (18.4 km)	Trailers were either damaged or destroyed with houses and businesses also sustaining damage. Six people were injured.
F1	N of Natural Dam	Crawford	0708	1 mile (1.6 km)	Several houses were damaged.
Source: Tornado History Project - April 21, 1996 Storm Data, Quebec tornadoes 1985-present, NCDC Storm Data

== See also ==
- List of North American tornadoes and tornado outbreaks
- Tornado outbreak sequence of April 19–24, 2011
