= Oak Center, Wisconsin =

- Unincorporated community
- Location within Wisconsin Location within the United States
- Coordinates: 43°39′39″N 88°36′00″W
- Country: United States
- State: Wisconsin
- County: Fond du Lac
- Elevation: 902 ft (275 m)
- Time zone: UTC-6 (Central (CST))
  - Summer (DST): UTC-5 (CDT)
- Area code: 920
- GNIS feature ID: 1570599

Oak Center is an unincorporated community located in the town of Oakfield, Fond du Lac County, Wisconsin, United States.

Oak Center was named for a grove of oak trees near the original town site.
