= Anderson Whiting =

American politician

Anderson Whiting was a member of the Wisconsin State Assembly.

== Biography ==
Whiting was born on May 21, 1816. He died on January 2, 1887, and was buried in Waupun, Wisconsin.

His brother, A. Chapin Whiting, was also a member of the Assembly.

== Career ==
Whiting was a member of the Assembly in 1854 and 1860. Originally a Whig, he later became a Republican.
