= Power flash =

Flash caused by broken electrical equipment during a storm

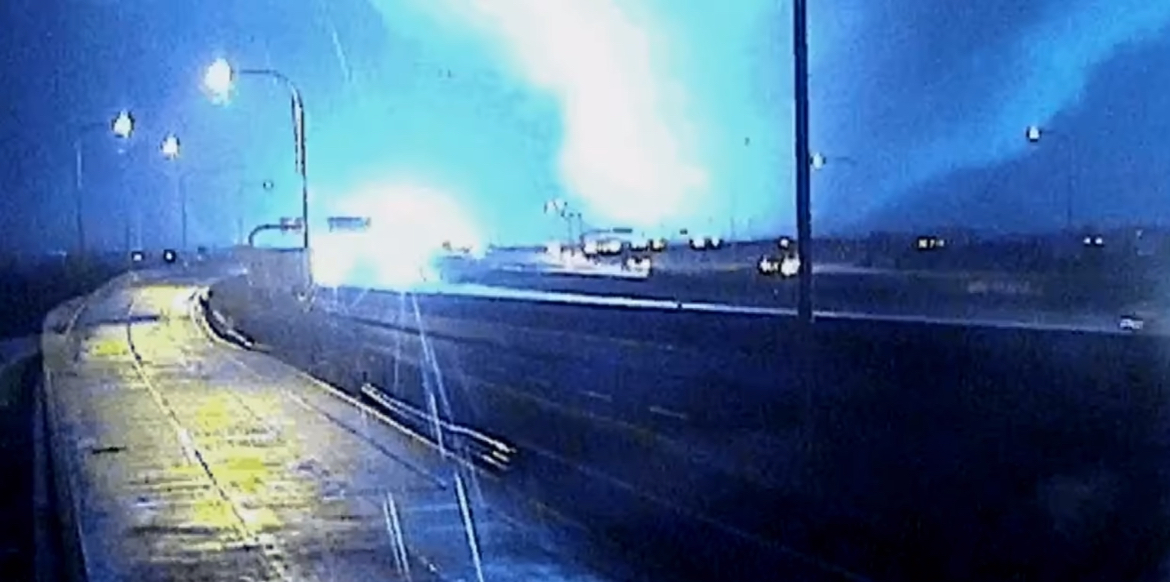
The 2015 Garland tornado causing a power flash on the left of the tornado on a highway.

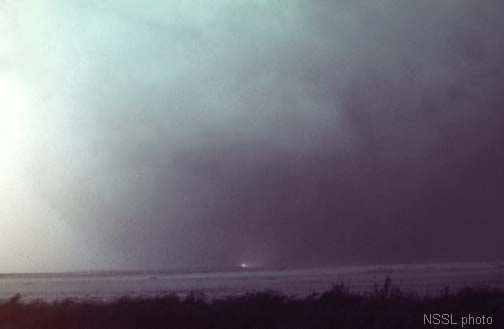
A power flash caused by a tornado hidden by heavy rain.

A power flash is a flash of light caused by arcing electrical discharges from damaged electrical equipment, most often severed or arcing power lines. They are often caused by strong winds, especially those from tropical cyclones and tornadoes, and occasionally by intense downbursts and derechoes. Storm spotters and meteorologists use these flashes to spot tornadoes which would otherwise be invisible due to rain or darkness. They can be distinguished from lightning by the fact that they originate at ground level, the blue or green color of the flash, and depending on distance, the sound of high-voltage lines shorting out. Power flashes directly result in localized power outages.

== See also ==
- Electric discharge
- Electric arc
