= Amos Chapin Whiting =

19th century American politician

A. Chapin Whiting
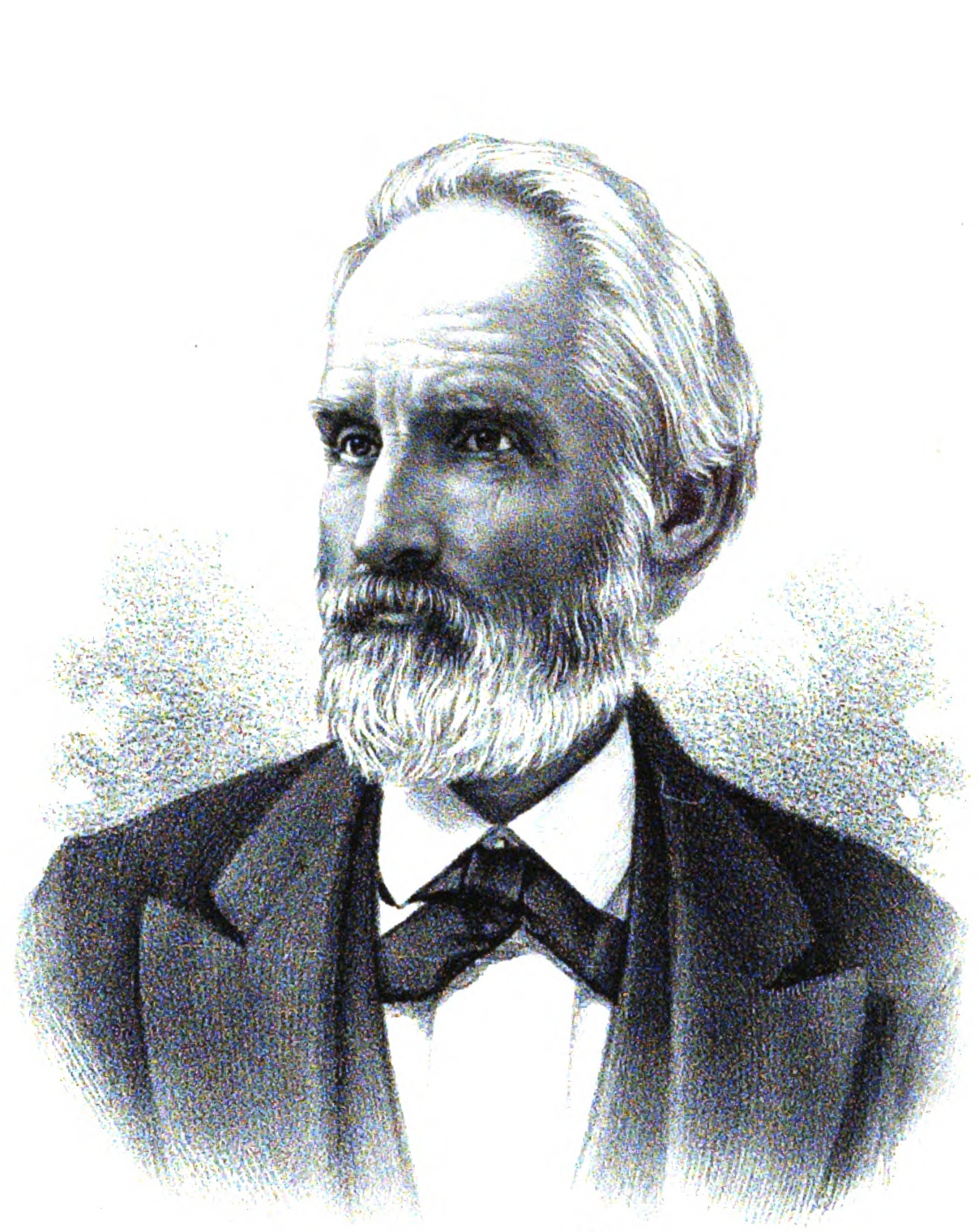
- From Portrait and biographical album of Fond du Lac County, Wisconsin (1889)

Member of the Wisconsin State Assembly from the Fond du Lac 2nd district
- In office January 7, 1867 – January 6, 1868
- Preceded by: George F. Clark
- Succeeded by: Rollin C. Kelley

Personal details
- Born: May 20, 1825 Boston, New York, U.S.
- Died: May 7, 1899 (aged 73) Wisconsin, U.S.
- Resting place: Wedges Prairie Cemetery, Waupun, Wisconsin
- Party: Republican; Natl. Union (1863–1867); Whig (before 1854)
- Spouse: Valucia Violant Williams (m. 1850–1899)
- Children: D'Everado Whiting; Lucina Blackmar (O'Neil); Morgiana (Curtis); Philinda Whiting; Elmina Roxana (Hopkins); Robert A. Whiting; Joseph Williams Whiting; Martin Whiting
- Relatives: Anderson Whiting (brother); Warren Whiting (brother)
- Occupation: Farmer

Amos Chapin Whiting (May 20, 1825 – May 7, 1899) was an American farmer, politician, and Wisconsin pioneer. He served in the Wisconsin State Assembly, representing Fond du Lac County during the 1867 session.

== Biography ==
Whiting was born on May 20, 1825, in Boston, New York, and raised on his father's farm. He assisted his father on the farm during the summers and attended school in the winters, then attended an academy in Erie County, New York. At age 19, he decided to emigrate to the Wisconsin Territory, following his older brothers Anderson and Joseph.

He settled first at Johnstown, in Rock County, Wisconsin, where his brother Joseph had become established. He purchased land, but stayed for only a year. He returned to his father's home in the Fall of 1845, then went to work as a school teacher, working in Upper Canada for the Winter of 1845–1846, then teaching a term in Erie County for the Winter of 1846–1847.

In May 1847, he returned to Johnstown, Wisconsin, and sold the land he had earlier purchased. In the intervening years, two other brothers—Warren and Ellis—had arrived in Wisconsin and settled at Waupun, Wisconsin, in Fond du Lac County. Through his brother Ellis, Amos had purchased a plot of 80 acres in the town of Springvale. After selling his land in Rock County, he went north on foot to Springvale to take ownership of his new homestead. With his profits, he purchased more land and doubled the size of his estate.

He continued to expand his estate as he began to profit from his land and soon controlled 320 acres. He established dairy production on his land, maintaining fifty cows, and was soon annually shipping 100,000 pounds of cheese and 1,000,000 pounds of cream.

== Political career ==
A. Chapin Whiting was originally a member of the Whig Party, but became a Republican when that party was established in the 1850s. He was elected several times as town clerk and town chairman, and was appointed deputy collector of internal revenue for Fond du Lac County during the American Civil War.

In 1866, he was elected to the Wisconsin State Assembly, running on the National Union Party ticket. He served only the one term, the 1867 session. He was an unsuccessful candidate for Wisconsin State Senate in 1874, defeated by incumbent William Hiner.

He died on May 7, 1899, and was buried in Waupun, Wisconsin.

== Personal life and family ==
Amos Chapin Whiting was the fifth of eight children born to Amos Whiting and Elsie (née Chase). All four of his older brothers also emigrated from New York to Wisconsin, and two of them also served in the Wisconsin State Assembly—Anderson Whiting and Warren Whiting.

The Whitings were descendants of Nathaniel Whiting, who emigrated from England to the Massachusetts Bay Colony in 1638 and was one of the founders of Dedham, Massachusetts.

On October 8, 1850, Amos Chapin Whiting married Valucia Violant Williams. Valucia Williams was a direct descendant of Roger Williams, the founder of the Providence Plantations (Rhode Island). Amos and Valucia Whiting had eight children, all of whom survived them.

Wisconsin State Assembly
Preceded by George F. Clark	Member of the Wisconsin State Assembly from the Fond du Lac 2nd district January 7, 1867 – January 6, 1868	Succeeded by Rollin C. Kelley
