= Roelof Sleyster =

Dutch American farmer and politician (1815–1882)

Member of the Wisconsin State Assembly from the Fond du Lac 2nd district
- In office January 3, 1870 – January 2, 1871
- Preceded by: Benjamin H. Bettis
- Succeeded by: John Aaron Baker

Personal details
- Born: December 25, 1815 Zutphen, Gelderland, Netherlands
- Died: June 4, 1882 (aged 66) Waupun, Wisconsin, U.S.
- Resting place: Alto Cemetery, Alto, Wisconsin
- Party: Republican
- Spouse: Johanna Hendrica Liesveld (m. 1849–1882)
- Children: 6

Roelof "Ralph" Sleyster (December 25, 1815 – June 4, 1882) was a Dutch American immigrant, farmer, painter, Republican politician, and Wisconsin pioneer. He was an early settler in what is now the town of Alto, Wisconsin, and represented that region of Fond du Lac County in the Wisconsin State Assembly for the 1870 term; he also served 14 years on the Fond du Lac County board of supervisors.

== Background ==
He was born December 25, 1815, in Zutphen in The Netherlands; his father was a painter and grainer. Sleyster learned the trade and worked with his father until 1846 when he was one of two Secession Church members (Sleyster was a deacon in the Seceder church at Velp, Gelderland) sent to America by Albertus van Raalte (with a missive titled ""To the believers in the United States of North America") to investigate suitable locations for the group of Protestant Reformed Dutch immigrants who eventually founded the city of Holland, Michigan. He reached Milwaukee in the summer of 1846, and informed Van Raalte that the Hollanders there had work and ate well. Sleyster's letter convinced van Raalte to lead the first group of Seceder immigrants to America, initially intending to settle at Fond du Lac, Wisconsin, on the shores of Lake Winnebago; but van Raalte eventually was persuaded to go to what would become Holland, Michigan instead. Sleyster himself settled on Alto. Most of the early settlers of Alto were Gelderlanders like himself.

== Wisconsin career ==
He was married in Milwaukee, June 26, 1847, to Johanna H. Liesveld, who was born April 6, 1822, in Arnhem. They settled on the farm in Alto, which Sleyster managed, while also working as a painter. He was a strong Republican, and in 1869 was elected for a single one-year term to the Wisconsin State Assembly in the 23rd Wisconsin Legislature of 1870. He did not run for re-election, and was succeeded by fellow Republican John Aaron Baker. As of 1880, continued to manage the family farm. As of that date, he had been clerk of his school district for 21 years, and a county supervisor for 14.
