= Elihu Colman =

19th century American politician

United States Attorney for the Eastern District of Wisconsin
- In office February 6, 1890 – April 1893
- Appointed by: Benjamin Harrison
- Preceded by: William A. Walker
- Succeeded by: John H. M. Wigman

Member of the Wisconsin State Assembly from the Fond du Lac 2nd district
- In office January 1, 1872 – January 6, 1873
- Preceded by: John Aaron Baker
- Succeeded by: Rensselaer Morse Lewis

Personal details
- Born: May 11, 1841 Oneida, Wisconsin, U.S.
- Died: January 25, 1899 (aged 57) Green Bay, Wisconsin, U.S.
- Party: Republican
- Spouse: Mary Elizabeth Hill
- Children: Edna M. Colman^{(b. 1873; died 1961)}; Paul Elihu Colman^{(b. 1879; died 1958)}
- Parent: Henry R. Colman (father)

Military service
- Allegiance: United States
- Branch/service: United States Volunteers; Union Army
- Years of service: 1861–1863
- Rank: Musician
- Unit: 1st Reg. Wis. Vol. Cavalry
- Battles/wars: American Civil War

Elihu Colman (May 11, 1841 – January 25, 1899) was an American lawyer and Republican politician. He was a member of the Wisconsin State Assembly, representing Fond du Lac County during the 1872 session. He later served as United States Attorney for the Eastern District of Wisconsin in 1890 under U.S. President Benjamin Harrison.

== Biography ==
Born in Oneida, Wisconsin, his father was Henry R. Colman, who was a Methodist minister and missionary among the Oneida Tribe. In 1847, Colman and his family moved to Fond du Lac, Wisconsin. He served in the 1st Wisconsin Cavalry Regiment of the Union Army during the American Civil War, achieving the rank of quartermaster sergeant. Colman graduated from Lawrence University in 1865. He then studied law and was admitted to the Wisconsin bar. In 1873, Colman served in the Wisconsin State Assembly.

In 1880, he was the Republican nominee for Wisconsin's 5th congressional district, receiving 14,753 votes to 16,984 for Democratic incumbent Edward S. Bragg and 1,188 for Greenbacker John E. Thomas. Colman was appointed United States Attorney for the United States District Court for the Eastern District of Wisconsin in 1890 by President Benjamin Harrison. He died unexpectedly in Green Bay, Wisconsin.
