= John Aaron Baker =

19th century American politician

John A. Baker

Member of the Wisconsin State Assembly from the Fond du Lac 2nd district
- In office January 2, 1871 – January 1, 1872
- Preceded by: Roelof Sleyster
- Succeeded by: Elihu Colman

Personal details
- Born: March 25, 1839 Stephenson County, Illinois, U.S.
- Died: November 19, 1919 (aged 80) Everett, Washington, U.S.
- Resting place: Evergreen Cemetery, Everett, Washington
- Party: Republican
- Spouse: Harmony Addie Bly (m. 1871–1919)
- Children: Walter Guy Baker^{(b. 1871; died 1939)}; Arthur S. Baker^{(b. 1878; died 1884)}
- Education: Lawrence University; Albany Law School
- Profession: Lawyer

Military service
- Allegiance: United States
- Branch/service: United States Volunteers; Union Army
- Years of service: 1861–1865
- Rank: 1st Lieutenant, USV
- Unit: 1st Reg. Wis. Vol. Cavalry
- Battles/wars: American Civil War

John Aaron Baker (March 25, 1839 – November 19, 1919) was an American businessman and Republican politician. He was a member of the Wisconsin State Assembly, representing southwest Fond du Lac County during the 1871 session.

== Biography ==
John A. Baker was born March 25, 1839, in Stephenson County, Illinois. His father died when he was quite young, and he moved with his mother to Evansville, in Rock County, Wisconsin, where she remarried. They soon moved further north to Stevens Point and Wausau. Baker received a common school education and taught school at Wausau, where he was also elected town superintendent of schools.

In 1860, he enrolled in Lawrence University, in Appleton, Wisconsin, but his education was interrupted by the outbreak of the American Civil War.

Baker quickly volunteered for service in the Union Army and was enrolled in Company B of the 1st Wisconsin Cavalry Regiment. The 1st Wisconsin Cavalry served in many of the important campaigns of the western theater of the war, including Chickamauga, Chattanooga, and Atlanta.

Baker served most of the war with his company, promoted to corporal and then quartermaster sergeant. In early 1864, he was promoted to sergeant major, and then shortly thereafter commissioned as first lieutenant for Company I, where he served through most of the rest of the war. He was in command of his company for much of his time as first lieutenant, and was offered a promotion to captain in January 1865, but declined. He mustered out in March 1865, at the expiration of his term of enlistment.

Following his war service, Baker returned to Portage County, Wisconsin, and was elected town clerk of Stockton. He subsequently attended the Albany Law School and moved east to Waupun, in Fond du Lac County in 1868.

In 1870, Baker was elected to the Wisconsin State Assembly running on the Republican Party ticket. He represented Fond du Lac County's 2nd Assembly district in the 1871 session, which then comprised a portion of the southwest corner of the county.

In 1871, Baker became invested in the Dodge County Mutual Insurance Company and was elected secretary of the company for three years. In 1874, he was one of the founding members of the all-volunteer Waupun Fire Company and was elected foreman of the company.

Baker left Wisconsin in 1875 and moved to Nebraska. He worked for a number of years as a dealer of water pumps and mills before moving further west to Washington in 1892. In Washington, Baker worked as a real estate dealer.

Baker died at his home in Everett, Washington, on November 19, 1919.

== Personal life and family ==
John A. Baker was the eldest son of Aaron Baker and his wife Anna (née Allen). He had a younger brother, William, who also served with him in the 1st Wisconsin Cavalry Regiment and lived his later years in Everett, Washington.

John A. Baker married Harmony Addie Bly in 1871. They had two children together, though their second son, Arthur, died in childhood.

Wisconsin State Assembly
Preceded by Roelof Sleyster	Member of the Wisconsin State Assembly from the Fond du Lac 2nd district January 2, 1871 – January 1, 1872	Succeeded by Elihu Colman
