= James Fenelon (politician) =

Wisconsin politician (1846–1915)

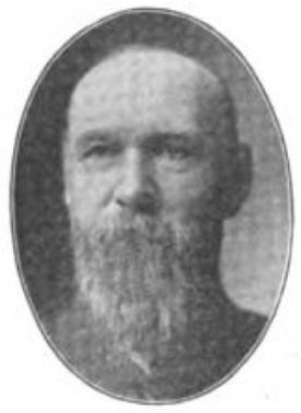

Member of the Wisconsin State Assembly
- Constituency: Fond du Lac County Second District
- In office 1900–1902
- In office 1908–1910

Personal details
- Born: James E. Fenelon; May 25, 1846 County Carlow, Ireland
- Died: September 24, 1915 (aged 69)
- Party: Republican
- Occupation: Farmer, politician

James E. Fenelon (May 25, 1846 – September 24, 1915) was a member of the Wisconsin State Assembly.

== Biography ==
Fenelon was born in County Carlow, Ireland around 1845; sources differ on the date. A Roman Catholic, he attended what is now Marquette University High School in Milwaukee, Wisconsin. Later, Fenelon owned a farm in Ripon, Wisconsin. In the 1880s he owned a meat market in Ripon, which was destroyed in a fire in 1885. He died on September 24, 1915.

== State legislative career ==
A Republican, Fenelon was elected to the Assembly in 1900 and 1908. Previously, he had refused a Democratic nomination for the Wisconsin State Senate in 1884.
