= Almon Swan =

American politician

Almon A. Swan (c. 1819 – May 17, 1883) was a member of the Wisconsin State Assembly.

== Biography ==
Swan was born in Berlin, New York, sources have differed on the exact date. He married Esther D. Alderman in Massachusetts in 1841. He died on May 17, 1883.

== Career ==
Swan was a member of the Assembly during the 1878 session. Other positions he held include Chairman (similar to Mayor) of Oakfield (town), Wisconsin. He was a Republican.
