= Manchester, Wisconsin =

Manchester is the name of places in the U.S. state of Wisconsin:

- Manchester, Green Lake County, Wisconsin
- Manchester (community), Green Lake County, Wisconsin
- Manchester, Jackson County, Wisconsin
- Manchester, former name for Brothertown, Wisconsin in Calumet County from 1843 until 1857
