= Henry A. Ripley =

American businessman and politician (1842–1926)

Henry Allen Ripley (March 4, 1842 – October 25, 1926) was an American businessman and politician.

Born in Sand Lake, New York, Ripley moved with his parents and settled in Oakfield, Wisconsin Territory in 1844. Ripley went to Fond du Lac High School. He was a farmer and also taught school. Ripley was in the lumber and coal business in Oakfield, Wisconsin. Ripley served on the village high school board. In 1899, Ripley served in the Wisconsin State Assembly and was a Republican. Ripley died at his home in Oakfield, Wisconsin.
