= Henry D. Hitt =

American politician

Henry D. Hitt (September 15, 1823 – June 23, 1907) was an American farmer, businessman, and legislator.

Born in Danby, Vermont, Hitt moved to Wisconsin Territory in 1847 and settled on a farm in the town of Oakfield in Fond du Lac County, Wisconsin. Hitt served in the Wisconsin State Assembly in 1858. Hitt also served on the Wisconsin State Board of Agriculture and Wisconsin Board of Regents. He was a member of the Wisconsin state and Fond du Lac agricultural societies. In addition to farming, Hitt was in the banking and insurance businesses. Hitt died in Oakfield following a stroke of paralysis.
