= Oakfield, Wisconsin =

- Village
- Location of Oakfield in Fond du Lac County, Wisconsin.
- Coordinates: 43°41′3.1″N 88°32′53.9″W
- Country: United States
- State: Wisconsin
- County: Fond du Lac

Area
  - Total: 0.99 sq mi (2.56 km^{2})
  - Land: 0.98 sq mi (2.55 km^{2})
  - Water: 0.0039 sq mi (0.01 km^{2})
- Elevation: 860 ft (262 m)

Population (2020)
  - Total: 1,052
  - Density: 1,107.0/sq mi (427.43/km^{2})
- Time zone: UTC-6 (Central (CST))
  - Summer (DST): UTC-5 (CDT)
- Area code: 920
- FIPS code: 55-58925
- GNIS feature ID: 1570697
- Website: villageofoakfield.com

Oakfield is a village in Fond du Lac County, Wisconsin, United States. The population was 1,052 at the 2020 census. The village is located within the Town of Oakfield.

== History ==
A post office called Oakfield has been in operation since 1850. The village was named for a grove of oak trees near the original town site.

On July 18, 1996, an F5 tornado ripped through the village, destroying 47 homes but killing no one.

== Geography ==
Oakfield is located at 43°41′3″N 88°32′54″W (43.684167, -88.548551).

According to the United States Census Bureau, the village has a total area of 0.98 square miles (2.54 km^{2}), all land.

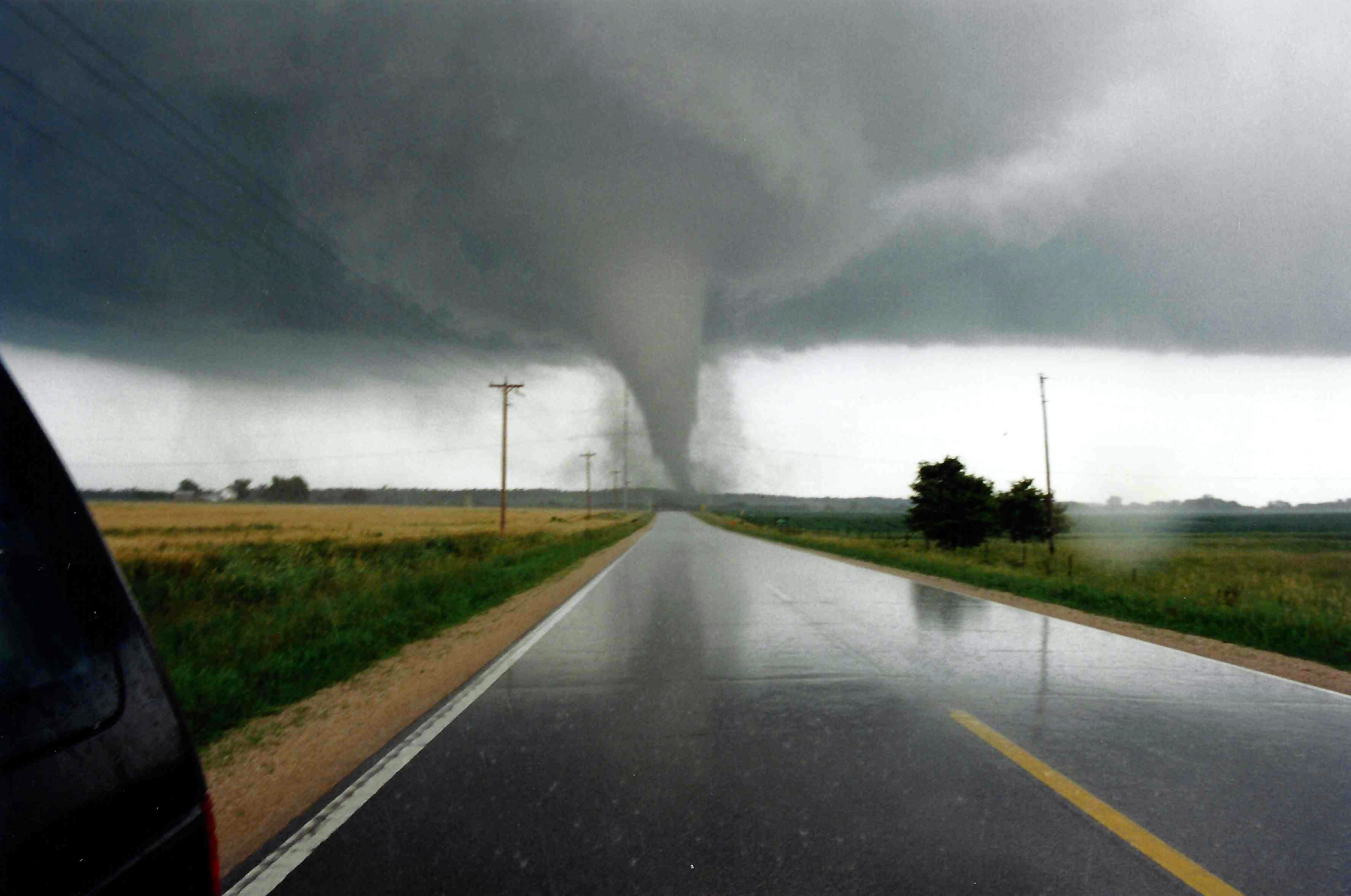
The Oakfield, Wisconsin tornado

== Demographics ==
Historical population
Census	Pop.	Note	%±
1880	315		—
1910	522		—
1920	556		6.5%
1930	577		3.8%
1940	655		13.5%
1950	697		6.4%
1960	772		10.8%
1970	918		18.9%
1980	990		7.8%
1990	1,003		1.3%
2000	1,012		0.9%
2010	1,075		6.2%
2020	1,052		−2.1%
U.S. Decennial Census

=== 2020 census ===
As of the census of 2020, there were 1052 people, 507 households, and 219 families living in the village. The population density was 1,062.6 inhabitants per square mile (410.3/km^{2}). There were 434 housing units at an average density of 438.4 per square mile (169.3/km^{2}). The racial makeup of the village was 93.8% White, 0.5% Black or African American, 0.1% Native American, 1.1% Asian, 0.2% from other races, and 4.3% from two or more races. Hispanic or Latino of any race were 2.1% of the population.

=== 2010 census ===
As of the census of 2010, there were 1,075 people, 392 households, and 307 families living in the village. The population density was 1,096.9 inhabitants per square mile (423.5/km^{2}). There were 415 housing units at an average density of 423.5 per square mile (163.5/km^{2}). The racial makeup of the village was 96.9% White, 0.2% African American, 0.3% Native American, 0.4% Asian, 0.3% from other races, and 2.0% from two or more races. Hispanic or Latino of any race were 1.8% of the population.

There were 392 households, of which 36.7% had children under the age of 18 living with them, 66.1% were married couples living together, 8.7% had a female householder with no husband present, 3.6% had a male householder with no wife present, and 21.7% were non-families. 19.1% of all households were made up of individuals, and 7.9% had someone living alone who was 65 years of age or older. The average household size was 2.74 and the average family size was 3.13.

The median age in the village was 40.3 years. 26.2% of residents were under the age of 18; 8.6% were between the ages of 18 and 24; 22.7% were from 25 to 44; 29.7% were from 45 to 64; and 12.7% were 65 years of age or older. The gender makeup of the village was 49.3% male and 50.7% female.

=== 2000 census ===
As of the census of 2000, there were 1,012 people, 370 households, and 283 families living in the village. The population density was 1,049.9 people per square mile (407.0/km^{2}). There were 384 housing units at an average density of 398.4 per square mile (154.4/km^{2}). The racial makeup of the village was 98.42% White, 0.10% Black or African American, 0.30% Native American, 0.30% Asian, 0.59% from other races, and 0.30% from two or more races. 2.87% of the population were Hispanic or Latino of any race.

There were 370 households, out of which 39.5% had children under the age of 18 living with them, 63.5% were married couples living together, 7.8% had a female householder with no husband present, and 23.5% were non-families. 20.0% of all households were made up of individuals, and 10.8% had someone living alone who was 65 years of age or older. The average household size was 2.74 and the average family size was 3.15.

In the village, the population was spread out, with 28.5% under the age of 18, 7.0% from 18 to 24, 29.6% from 25 to 44, 23.3% from 45 to 64, and 11.6% who were 65 years of age or older. The median age was 36 years. For every 100 females, there were 98.0 males. For every 100 females age 18 and over, there were 101.1 males.

The median income for a household in the village was $51,053, and the median income for a family was $56,154. Males had a median income of $37,833 versus $24,625 for females. The per capita income for the village was $21,131. About 1.1% of families and 1.9% of the population were below the poverty line, including none of those under age 18 and 8.3% of those age 65 or over.

== Notable people ==
- Edson A. Putnam, Wisconsin State Representative, lived in Oakfield.
- Henry A. Ripley, Wisconsin State Representative, lived in Oakfield.
- William F. Sommerfield, Wisconsin State Representative, lived in Oakfield.
