= 12th Wisconsin Legislature =

Wisconsin legislative term for 1859

←	11th	13th	→

Overview
- Legislative body: Wisconsin Legislature
- Meeting place: Wisconsin State Capitol
- Term: January 3, 1859 – January 2, 1860
- Election: November 2, 1858

Senate
- Members: 30
- Senate President: Erasmus D. Campbell (D)
- President pro tempore: Denison Worthington (R)
- Party control: Democratic

Assembly
- Members: 97
- Assembly Speaker: William P. Lyon (R)
- Party control: Republican

Sessions
- 1st: January 12, 1859 – March 21, 1859

The Twelfth Wisconsin Legislature convened from January 12, 1859, to March 21, 1859, in regular session.

Senators representing odd-numbered districts were newly elected for this session and were serving the first year of a two-year term. Assembly members were elected to a one-year term. Assembly members and even-numbered senators were elected in the general election of November 2, 1858. Senators representing even-numbered districts were serving the second year of their two-year term, having been elected in the general election held on November 3, 1857.

The governor of Wisconsin during this entire term was Republican Alexander Randall, of Waukesha County, serving the second year of a two-year term, having won election in the 1857 Wisconsin gubernatorial election.

== Major events ==
- March 7, 1859: The United States Supreme Court ruled on the case of Ableman v. Booth, vacating the Wisconsin Supreme Court decision which had attempted to nullify enforcement of the Fugitive Slave Act of 1850 in Wisconsin.
- April 12, 1859: Edward V. Whiton, Chief Justice of the Wisconsin Supreme Court, died in office.
- April 19, 1859: Luther S. Dixon was appointed Chief Justice of the Wisconsin Supreme Court.
- November 8, 1859: Alexander Randall was re-elected as Governor of Wisconsin.

== Party summary ==
=== Senate summary ===
	Party (Shading indicates majority caucus)			Total	
	Democratic	Ind.	Republican	Total	Vacant
End of previous Legislature	12	0	18	30	0
1st Session	14	0	16	30	0
From Oct. 1 (Note: Democrat Lion Silverman (District 3) resigned October 1, 1859, to run for State Treasurer.)	13	0	16	29	1
Final voting share	47%	0%	53%		
Beginning of the next Legislature	11	0	19	30	0

=== Assembly summary ===
	Party (Shading indicates majority caucus)			Total	
	Democratic	Ind.	Republican	Total	Vacant
End of previous Legislature	44	0	53	97	0
Start of 1st Session	41	1	54	96	1
after January 17	40	1	55	96	1
after January 20	41	1	55	97	0
Final voting share	43%	0%	57%		
Beginning of the next Legislature	37	1	59	97	0

== Sessions ==
- 1st Regular session: January 12, 1859 – March 21, 1859

== Leaders ==
=== Senate leadership ===
- President of the Senate: Erasmus D. Campbell, Lieutenant Governor
- President pro tempore: Denison Worthington

=== Assembly leadership ===
- Speaker of the Assembly: William P. Lyon

== Members ==
=== Members of the Senate ===
Members of the Wisconsin Senate for the Twelfth Wisconsin Legislature (30):

Senate Partisan representation Democratic: 14 seats Republican: 16 seats

District	Counties	Senator	Party	Residence
01	Sheboygan	Robert H. Hotchkiss	Dem.	Plymouth
02	Brown, Door, Kewaunee, Oconto, Outagamie, Shawanaw	Morgan Lewis Martin	Dem.	Green Bay
03	Ozaukee	Lion Silverman	Dem.	Ozaukee
04	Washington	Densmore W. Maxon	Dem.	Cedar Creek
05	Milwaukee (Northern Half)	Cicero Comstock	Rep.	Milwaukee
06	Milwaukee (Southern Half)	Patrick Walsh	Dem.	Milwaukee
07	Racine	Nicholas D. Fratt	Dem.	Racine
08	Kenosha	Samuel R. McClellan	Rep.	Wilmot
09	Adams, Juneau, Sauk	H. W. Curtis	Rep.	Delton
10	Waukesha	Denison Worthington	Rep.	Summit
11	Dane (Eastern Part)	William Robert Taylor	Dem.	Cottage Grove
12	Walworth	John W. Boyd	Rep.	Geneva
13	Lafayette	Philemon B. Simpson	Dem.	Shullsburg
14	Jefferson (Northern Part) and Dodge (Southern Part)	William Chappell	Dem.	Watertown
15	Iowa, Richland	Charles Rodolf	Dem.	Orion
16	Grant	Noah H. Virgin	Rep.	Platteville
17	Rock (Western Part)	Zebulon P. Burdick	Rep.	Janesville
18	Rock (Eastern Part)	Alden I. Bennett	Rep.	Beloit
19	Manitowoc, Calumet	Samuel H. Thurber	Dem.	Manitowoc
20	Fond du Lac	Edward Pier	Rep.	Fond du Lac
21	Winnebago	Ganem W. Washburn	Rep.	Oshkosh
22	Dodge (Northern Part)	William E. Smith	Rep.	Fox Lake
23	Jefferson (Southern Part)	Enias D. Masters	Rep.	Jefferson
24	Green	John H. Warren	Rep.	Albany
25	Columbia	Moses M. Davis	Rep.	Portage
26	Dane (Western Part)	Andrew Proudfit	Dem.	Madison
27	Marathon, Portage, Waupaca, Waushara, Wood	Luther Hanchett	Rep.	Stanton
28	Burnett, Chippewa, Clark, Douglas, Dunn, Eau Claire, La Pointe, Pierce, Polk, St. Croix	Daniel Mears	Dem.	Osceola Mills
29	Marquette	M. W. Seely	Rep.	Marquette
30	Bad Ax, Buffalo, Crawford, Jackson, La Crosse, Monroe, Tremealeau	William H. Tucker	Dem.	La Crosse

=== Members of the Assembly ===
Members of the Assembly for the Twelfth Wisconsin Legislature:

Assembly partisan representation Democratic: 41 seats Independent: 1 seat Republican: 55 seats

Senate District	County	District	Representative	Party	Residence
09	Adams & Juneau		John Turner	Rep.	Mauston
28	Ashland, Burnett, Douglas, La Pointe, Polk, & St. Croix		Moses S. Gibson (Until Jan. 17)	Rep.	Hudson
28	Ashland, Burnett, Douglas, La Pointe, Polk, & St. Croix		Marcus W. McCracken (From Jan. 17)	Dem.	Superior
30	Bad Ax & Crawford		Thomas R. Tower	Rep.	Towerville
02	Brown		William Field Jr.	Dem.	De Pere
30	Buffalo, Jackson, Trempealeau		Jesse Bennett	Rep.	Fountain City
19	Calumet		Harrison C. Hobart	Dem.	Chilton
28	Chippewa, Clark, Dunn, & Pierce		Richard Dewhurst	Rep.	Neillsville
25	Columbia	1	Gysbert Van Steenwyk	Rep.	Kilbourn City
25	Columbia	2	William M. Griswold	Rep.	Columbus
25	Columbia	3	John O. Jones	Rep.	Cambria
11	Dane	1	William W. Blackman	Rep.	Stoughton
11	Dane	2	Adam Smith	Dem.	Burke
11	Dane	3	John Keenan	Dem.	Fitchburg
26	Dane	4	Chester N. Waterbury	Dem.	Roxbury
26	Dane	5	Harlow S. Orton	Dem.	Madison
26	Dane	6	George B. Smith	Dem.	Madison
22	Dodge	1	Thomas Palmer	Dem.	Mayville
22	Dodge	2	John C. Bishop	Dem.	LeRoy
22	Dodge	3	Waldo Lyon	Rep.	Hustisford
22	Dodge	4	Cyrus S. Kneeland	Rep.	Waupun
22	Dodge	5	Lorenzo Merrill	Rep.	Burnett
22	Dodge	6	John Lowth	Dem.	Lowell
02	Door, Kewaunee, Oconto, Shawano		Matthias Simon	Dem.	Ahnapee
20	Fond du Lac	1	Alvan E. Bovay	Rep.	Ripon
20	Fond du Lac	2	Warren Whiting	Rep.	Ladoga
20	Fond du Lac	3	John C. Lewis	Rep.	Fond du Lac
20	Fond du Lac	4	--Vacant-- (until Jan. 21) (Note: S. K. Barnes was elected to this seat in the November 1858 general election, but died before inauguration. O. Hugo Petters was chosen in a special election held January 13, 1859.)		
20	Fond du Lac	4	O. Hugo Petters (from Jan. 21)	Dem.	Murone
20	Fond du Lac	5	Silas C. Matteson	Rep.	Waucousta
16	Grant	1	George Broderick	Dem.	Hazel Green
16	Grant	2	James W. Seaton	Dem.	Potosi
16	Grant	3	Jesse Waldorf	Rep.	Platteville
16	Grant	4	Hugh A. W. McNair	Rep.	Fennimore
16	Grant	5	Luther Basford	Rep.	Glen Haven
24	Green	1	Albert H. Pierce	Rep.	Monticello
24	Green	2	Edmund A. West	Rep.	Monroe
15	Iowa	1	Gardiner C. Meigs	Dem.	Arena
15	Iowa	2	John Toay	Rep.	Mineral Point
23	Jefferson	1	Alexander J. Craig	Rep.	Palmyra
23	Jefferson	2	George C. Smith	Rep.	Oakland
14	Jefferson	3	Luther A. Cole	Rep.	Watertown
14	Jefferson	4	Ferdinand Wagner	Dem.	Watertown
14	Jefferson	5	Sylvester J. Conklin	Rep.	Waterloo
08	Kenosha	1	George Bennett	Rep.	Kenosha
08	Kenosha	2	James C. McKisson	Rep.	Wheatland
30	La Crosse & Monroe		Charles W. Marshall	Rep.	La Crosse
13	Lafayette	1	James S. Murphy	Dem.	Benton
13	Lafayette	2	William M. McGranahan	Dem.	Fayette
13	Lafayette	3	David W. Kyle	Dem.	Shullsburg
19	Manitowoc	1	William Aldrich	Rep.	Two Rivers
19	Manitowoc	2	James B. Dunn	Dem.	Manitowoc
27	Marathon, Portage, & Wood		James S. Young	Dem.	Stevens Point
29	Marquette & Green Lake	1	Jesse Thomas	Rep.	Green Lake
29	Marquette & Green Lake	2	James B. Ormsby	Rep.	Oxford
05	Milwaukee	1	Edwin Palmer	Rep.	Milwaukee
05	Milwaukee	2	Charles J. Kern	Dem.	Milwaukee
06	Milwaukee	3	Thomas H. Eviston	Ind.	Milwaukee
06	Milwaukee	4	James A. Swain	Rep.	Milwaukee
06	Milwaukee	5	William S. Cross	Rep.	Milwaukee
05	Milwaukee	6	Joseph Walter	Dem.	Milwaukee
05	Milwaukee	7	Frederick Moskowitt	Dem.	Milwaukee
06	Milwaukee	8	Jacob Beck	Dem.	Milwaukee
06	Milwaukee	9	Edward Hasse	Dem.	Milwaukee
02	Outagamie		Perry H. Smith	Dem.	Appleton
03	Ozaukee	1	John R. Bohan	Dem.	Ozaukee
03	Ozaukee	2	Frederick W. Horn	Dem.	Cedarburg
07	Racine	1	William P. Lyon	Rep.	Racine
07	Racine	2	Leonard S. Van Vliet	Rep.	Caledonia
07	Racine	3	William Ballach	Rep.	Yorkville
07	Racine	4	Franklin E. Hoyt	Dem.	Rochester
15	Richland		William Dixon	Rep.	Lone Rock
18	Rock	1	William E. Wheeler	Rep.	Beloit
18	Rock	2	Edward Vincent	Rep.	Milton
17	Rock	3	John P. Dickson	Rep.	Janesville
17	Rock	4	Joseph K. P. Porter	Rep.	Cooksville
17	Rock	5	Elisha L. Carpenter	Rep.	Beloit
09	Sauk	1	Nelson Wheeler	Rep.	Humboldt
09	Sauk	2	Eli Otis Rudd	Rep.	Reedsburg
01	Sheboygan	1	William N. Shafter	Rep.	Sheboygan
01	Sheboygan	2	James Little	Dem.	Sheboygan Falls
01	Sheboygan	3	Stephen D. Littlefield	Dem.	Sheboygan Falls
12	Walworth	1	Reuben Rockwell	Rep.	Springfield
12	Walworth	2	Edward P. Cornick	Rep.	Delavan
12	Walworth	3	Newton S. Murphy	Rep.	Whitewater
12	Walworth	4	Daniel Hooper	Rep.	Troy
04	Washington	1	Gustave Streckewald	Dem.	Hartford
04	Washington	2	James Vollmar	Dem.	West Bend
04	Washington	3	Phillip Zimmerman	Dem.	Staatsville
10	Waukesha	1	Parker Sawyer	Rep.	Summit
10	Waukesha	2	William P. King	Dem.	Merton
10	Waukesha	3	Andrew E. Elmore	Dem.	Mukwonago
10	Waukesha	4	Charles T. Deissner	Dem.	Waukesha
10	Waukesha	5	Ira Blood	Rep.	Mukwonago
27	Waupaca		Warner C. Carr	Dem.	Crystal Lake
27	Waushara		Charles White	Rep.	Coloma
21	Winnebago	1	Richard P. Eighme	Dem.	Oshkosh
21	Winnebago	2	John D. Rush	Dem.	Winneconne
21	Winnebago	3	George W. Beckwith	Rep.	Omro

== Employees ==
=== Senate employees ===
- Chief Clerk: Hiram Bowen
  - Assistant Clerk: C. M. Cook
  - Engrossing Clerk: A. M. Thomson
  - Enrolling Clerk: C. T. Overton
  - Transcribing Clerk: G. M. O'Brien
- Sergeant-at-Arms: Asa Kinney
  - Assistant Sergeant-at-Arms: Jacob Low
- Postmaster: E. G. Garner
  - Post Messenger: Garrit Mahony
- Doorkeeper: D. C. Shelden
- Messengers:
  - William W. Worthington
  - Dwight Allen

=== Assembly employees ===
- Chief Clerk: L. H. D. Crane
  - Assistant Clerk: John S. Dean
  - Engrossing Clerk: George Burnside
  - Enrolling Clerk: George W. Stoner
  - Transcribing Clerk: Oliver Gibbs, Jr.
- Sergeant-at-Arms: Emanuel Munk
  - Assistant Sergeant-at-Arms: Joseph Gates
- Postmaster: Sewall W. Smith
  - Assistant Postmaster: Cyrus Fertig
- Doorkeeper: G. W. Munderloh
  - Assistant Doorkeeper: William Adams
- Firemen:
  - F. Brown
  - N. L. Andrews
- Messengers:
  - Cyrus Lanyon
  - John Ford
  - W. Howard Aldrich (12-year-old son of Assembly member William Aldrich)
  - Edward Livingston
  - Samuel Fernandez
