= 13th Wisconsin Legislature =

Wisconsin legislative term for 1860

←	12th	14th	→

Overview
- Legislative body: Wisconsin Legislature
- Meeting place: Wisconsin State Capitol
- Term: January 2, 1860 – January 7, 1861
- Election: November 8, 1859

Senate
- Members: 30
- Senate President: Butler G. Noble (R)
- President pro tempore: Moses M. Davis (R)
- Party control: Republican

Assembly
- Members: 97
- Assembly Speaker: William P. Lyon (R)
- Party control: Republican

Sessions
- 1st: January 11, 1860 – April 2, 1860

The Thirteenth Wisconsin Legislature convened from January 11, 1860, to April 2, 1860, in regular session.

Senators representing even-numbered districts were newly elected for this session and were serving the first year of a two-year term. Assembly members were elected to a one-year term. Assembly members and odd-numbered senators were elected in the general election of November 8, 1859. Senators representing odd-numbered districts were serving the second year of their two-year term, having been elected in the general election held on November 2, 1858.

The governor of Wisconsin during this entire term was Republican Alexander Randall, of Waukesha County, serving the first year of his second two-year term, having won re-election in the 1859 Wisconsin gubernatorial election.

== Major events ==
- January 2, 1860: 2nd Inauguration of Alexander Randall as Governor of Wisconsin.
- January 7, 1860: Assemblymember Andrew Eble, representing southwest Milwaukee County, died in a hunting accident.
- January 17, 1860: Assemblymember Daniel C. Jenne, representing Outagamie County, resigned his seat after it was demonstrated that he had actually lost his election to Milo Coles.
- January 23, 1860: Theodore Hartung won a special election to fill the Assembly vacancy created by Andrew Eble's death.
- November 6, 1860: Abraham Lincoln elected 16th President of the United States.
- December 24, 1860: Declaration of the Immediate Causes Which Induce and Justify the Secession of South Carolina from the Federal Union issued by the government of South Carolina.

== Major legislation ==
- March 27, 1860: Act to organize the county of Ashland, 1860 Act 211
- March 28, 1860: Joint Resolution relative to grants of public lands to actual settlers and to passage of "The Homestead Bill," 1860 Joint Resolution 1
- March 30, 1860: Act to establish an official State paper, 1860 Act 240. Established the Wisconsin State Journal as the official state paper.
- March 30, 1860: Joint Resolution objecting to any change of the Naturalization Law, 1860 Joint Resolution 2
- March 31, 1860: Joint Resolution in relation to the Homestead Bill in Congress, 1860 Joint Resolution 3

== Party summary ==
=== Senate summary ===
	Party (Shading indicates majority caucus)		Total	
	Democratic	Republican	Total	Vacant
End of previous Legislature	14	16	30	0
1st Session	11	19	30	0
Final voting share	36.67%	63.33%		
Beginning of the next Legislature	8	22	30	0

=== Assembly summary ===
	Party (Shading indicates majority caucus)			Total	
	Democratic	Ind.	Republican	Total	Vacant
End of previous Legislature	41	1	55	97	0
Start of 1st Session	37	1	59	97	0
after January 7 (Note: Andrew Eble (Milwaukee 9th district) died.)	36	1	59	96	1
after January 17 (Note: Milo Coles replaced Daniel C. Jenne (Outagamie County) due to successful election challenge.)	37	1	58	97	1
after February 2 (Note: Theodore Hartung replaced Andrew Eble (deceased; Milwaukee 9th district).)	38	1	58	97	0
Final voting share	39%	1%	60%		
Beginning of the next Legislature	27	0	70	97	0

== Sessions ==
- 1st Regular session: January 11, 1860 – April 2, 1860

== Leaders ==
=== Senate leadership ===
- President of the Senate: Butler G. Noble, Lieutenant Governor
- President pro tempore: Moses M. Davis

=== Assembly leadership ===
- Speaker of the Assembly: William P. Lyon

== Members ==
=== Members of the Senate ===
Members of the Wisconsin Senate for the Thirteenth Wisconsin Legislature:

Senate Partisan representation Democratic: 12 seats Republican: 18 seats

District	Counties	Senator	Party	Residence
01	Sheboygan	Robert H. Hotchkiss	Dem.	Plymouth
02	Brown, Door, Kewaunee, Oconto, Outagamie, Shawanaw	Edward Decker	Dem.	Kewaunee
03	Ozaukee	Frederick Hilgen	Dem.	Cedarburg
04	Washington	Densmore W. Maxon	Dem.	Cedar Creek
05	Northern Milwaukee	Cicero Comstock	Rep.	Milwaukee
06	Southern Milwaukee	Michael J. Egan	Dem.	Franklin
07	Racine	Nicholas D. Fratt	Dem.	Racine
08	Kenosha	George Bennett	Rep.	Kenosha
09	Adams, Juneau, Sauk	H. W. Curtis	Rep.	Delton
10	Waukesha	Denison Worthington	Rep.	Summit
11	Eastern Dane	William R. Taylor	Dem.	Cottage Grove
12	Walworth	Oscar F. Bartlett	Rep.	East Troy
13	Lafayette	Philemon B. Simpson	Dem.	Shullsburg
14	Northern Jefferson	Charles R. Gill	Rep.	Watertown
15	Iowa, Richland	Charles Rodolf	Dem.	Orion
16	Grant	Noah H. Virgin	Rep.	Platteville
17	Rock (Western Part)	Zebulon P. Burdick	Rep.	Janesville
18	Rock (Eastern Part)	Alden I. Bennett	Rep.	Beloit
19	Manitowoc, Calumet	Samuel H. Thurber	Dem.	Manitowoc
20	Fond du Lac	Elihu Phillips	Rep.	Fond du Lac
21	Winnebago	Ganem W. Washburn	Rep.	Oshkosh
22	Dodge	Benjamin Ferguson	Dem.	Fox Lake
23	Southern Jefferson	Enias D. Masters	Rep.	Jefferson
24	Green	John W. Stewart	Rep.	Monroe
25	Columbia	Moses M. Davis	Rep.	Portage
26	Dane (Western Part)	John B. Sweat	Dem.	Black Earth
27	Marathon, Portage, Waupaca, Waushara, Wood	Luther Hanchett	Rep.	Stanton
28	Burnett, Chippewa, Clark, Douglas, Dunn, La Pointe, Pierce, Polk, St. Croix	Charles B. Cox	Rep.	River Falls
29	Marquette	M. W. Seely	Rep.	Marquette
30	Bad Ax, Buffalo, Crawford, Jackson, La Crosse, Monroe, Tremealeau	Buel E. Hutchinson	Rep.	Prairie du Chien

=== Members of the Assembly ===
Members of the Assembly for the Thirteenth Wisconsin Legislature:

Assembly partisan representation Democratic: 39 seats Republican: 58 seats

Senate District	County	District	Representative	Party	Residence
09	Adams, Juneau		Albert Wood	Rep.	Quincy
28	Ashland, Burnett, Douglas, La Pointe, Polk, St. Croix		Asaph Whittlesey	Rep.	Whittlesey
30	Bad Ax, Crawford		William C. McMichael	Rep.	Viroqua
02	Brown		John C. Neville	Dem.	Green Bay
30	Buffalo, Jackson, Trempealeau		Romanzo Bunn	Rep.	Galesville
19	Calumet		Asaph Green	Dem.	Chilton
28	Chippewa, Clark, Dunn, Pierce		William P. Bartlett	Rep.	Eau Claire
25	Columbia	1	Henry B. Munn	Dem.	Portage
25	Columbia	2	William M. Griswold	Rep.	Columbus
25	Columbia	3	Marcus Barden	Rep.	Pardeeville
11	Dane	1	William W. Blackman	Rep.	Stoughton
11	Dane	2	Eleazor Grover Jr.	Dem.	Madison
11	Dane	3	John Beath	Dem.	Verona
26	Dane	4	Francis Fischer	Rep.	Cross Plains
26	Dane	5	Leonard J. Farwell	Rep.	Madison
26	Dane	6	Cassius Fairchild	Dem.	Madison
22	Dodge	1	Elva Simpson	Dem.	Iron Ridge
22	Dodge	2	Max Bachhuber	Dem.	Farmersville
22	Dodge	3	Jonathan W. Nash	Rep.	Oak Grove
22	Dodge	4	Stoddard Judd	Rep.	Fox Lake
22	Dodge	5	David S. Ordway	Rep.	Beaver Dam
22	Dodge	6	Harvey C. Griffin	Dem.	Oak Grove
02	Door, Kewaunee, Oconto, Shawano		John Wiley	Dem.	Shawano
20	Fond du Lac	1	Alvan E. Bovay	Rep.	Ripon
20	Fond du Lac	2	Benjamin H. Bettis	Rep.	Ladoga
20	Fond du Lac	3	John C. Lewis	Rep.	Fond du Lac
20	Fond du Lac	4	John Boyd	Dem.	Calumet
20	Fond du Lac	5	Wolcott T. Brooks	Rep.	Fond du Lac
16	Grant	1	James K. Spottswood	Rep.	Hazel Green
16	Grant	2	James W. Seaton	Dem.	Potosi
16	Grant	3	Jonathan B. Moore	Rep.	Muscoda
16	Grant	4	Samuel F. Clise	Rep.	Ellenboro
16	Grant	5	George Ballantine	Rep.	Patch Grove
24	Green	1	Walter S. Wescott	Rep.	Monroe
24	Green	2	Martin Mitchell	Rep.	Brodhead
29	Green Lake		James W. Burt	Rep.	Mackford
15	Iowa	1	Gardner C. Meigs	Dem.	Arena
15	Iowa	2	Amasa Cobb	Rep.	Mineral Point
23	Jefferson	1	Norman Horton	Rep.	Cold Spring
23	Jefferson	2	Charles Hammarquist	Rep.	Fort Atkinson
14	Jefferson	3	Heber Smith	Rep.	Watertown
14	Jefferson	4	H. H. Winter	Dem. Rep.	Watertown
14	Jefferson	5	John Sutton	Dem.	Milford
08	Kenosha	1	Meredith Howland	Rep.	Kenosha
08	Kenosha	2	Salmon Upson	Rep.	Bristol
30	La Crosse & Monroe		John J. McKay	Rep.	Sparta
13	Lafayette	1	Thomas C. L. Mackay	Dem.	Elk Grove
13	Lafayette	2	Samuel Cole	Dem.	Gratiot
13	Lafayette	3	Elijah C. Townsend	Dem.	Shullsburg
19	Manitowoc	1	Joseph Rankin	Dem.	Mishicot
19	Manitowoc	2	Henry Mulholland	Dem.	Meeme
27	Marathon, Portage, Wood		John Phillips	Rep.	Stevens Point
29	Marquette		Orrin W. Bow	Dem.	Kingston
05	Milwaukee	1	Henry L. Palmer	Dem.	Milwaukee
05	Milwaukee	2	Leonard Schmidtner	Dem.	Milwaukee
06	Milwaukee	3	Edward Keogh	Dem.	Milwaukee
06	Milwaukee	4	Edward D. Holton	Rep.	Milwaukee
06	Milwaukee	5	Edward G. Hayden	Rep.	Milwaukee
05	Milwaukee	6	Matthias Humann	Dem.	Milwaukee
05	Milwaukee	7	Patrick Dockry	Dem.	Ten Mile House
06	Milwaukee	8	John Ruan	Dem.	Oak Creek
06	Milwaukee	9	Andrew Eble (died Jan. 7)	Dem.	Milwaukee
06	Milwaukee	9	Theodore Hartung (from Feb. 2)	Dem.	
02	Outagamie		Daniel C. Jenne (until Jan. 17)	Rep.	Appleton
02	Outagamie		Milo Coles (from Jan. 17)	Dem.	Gratiot
03	Ozaukee	1	Anthony Ahlhauser	Dem.	Saukville
03	Ozaukee	2	Frederick W. Horn	Dem.	Cedarburg
07	Racine	1	William P. Lyon	Rep.	Racine
07	Racine	2	Lewis L. Baldwin	Rep.	Racine
07	Racine	3	Knud Langeland	Rep.	North Cape
07	Racine	4	Frederick A. Weage	Rep.	Waterford
15	Richland		Jeremiah L. Jackson	Dem.	Viola
18	Rock	1	William E. Wheeler	Rep.	Beloit
18	Rock	2	Thomas C. Westby	Rep.	Emerald Grove
17	Rock	3	John P. Dickson	Rep.	Janesville
17	Rock	4	Jeremiah Johnson	Rep.	Evansville
17	Rock	5	George Golden	Rep.	Brodhead
09	Sauk	1	Ephraim W. Young	Rep.	Prairie du Sac
09	Sauk	2	Edward Sumner	Rep.	Baraboo
01	Sheboygan	1	James T. Kingsbury	Dem.	Sheboygan
01	Sheboygan	2	Erastus W. Stannard	Rep.	Greenbush
01	Sheboygan	3	Oran Rogers	Rep.	Cascade
12	Walworth	1	Clarkson Miller	Rep.	Geneva
12	Walworth	2	John DeWolf	Rep.	Delavan
12	Walworth	3	Anderson Whiting	Rep.	Richmond
12	Walworth	4	James Child	Rep.	East Troy
04	Washington	1	George Kiefer	Dem.	Nenno
04	Washington	2	Matthias Altenhofen	Dem.	Kewaskum
04	Washington	3	Tisdale E. Vander Cook	Rep.	Newburg
10	Waukesha	1	Albert Alden	Rep.	Delafield
10	Waukesha	2	William R. Hesk	Dem.	Menomonee Falls
10	Waukesha	3	Andrew E. Elmore	Dem.	Mukwonago
10	Waukesha	4	Benjamin Hunkins	Dem.	New Berlin
10	Waukesha	5	Robert C. Robertson	Rep.	Vernon
27	Waupaca		Melvin B. Patchin	Dem.	Fremont
27	Waushara		Jacob S. Bugh	Rep.	Wautoma
21	Winnebago	1	Gabriel Bouck	Dem.	Oshkosh
21	Winnebago	2	George B. Goodwin	Rep.	Menasha
21	Winnebago	3	George S. Barnum	Rep.	Waukau

== Employees ==
=== Senate employees ===
- Chief Clerk: John H. Warren
  - Assistant Clerk: Willard Merrill
  - Engrossing Clerk: J. B. Selby
  - Enrolling Clerk: G. M. Powell
  - Transcribing Clerk: A. L. Burke
- Sergeant-at-Arms: Asa Kinney
  - Assistant Sergeant-at-Arms: S. S. Keyes
- Postmaster: James L. Wilder
  - Post Messenger: Garret J. Mahoney
- Doorkeeper: Henry M. Higbee
- Fireman: Franz G. L. Struve
- Messengers:
  - William W. Worthington
  - Walter C. Wyman
  - Sylvester Mygatt

=== Assembly employees ===
- Chief Clerk: L. H. D. Crane
  - Assistant Clerk: John S. Dean
  - Engrossing Clerk: R. S. Kingman
  - Enrolling Clerk: Thaddeus C. Pound
  - Transcribing Clerk: E. Gilbert Jackson
- Sergeant-at-Arms: Joseph Gates
  - Assistant Sergeant-at-Arms: A. Armstrong
- Postmaster: Marcus Otterbourg
  - Assistant Postmaster: Chancey B. Valentine
- Doorkeeper: William C. Lessure
  - Assistant Doorkeeper: John T. Taylor
- Firemen:
  - Nelson C. Andrews
  - Stephen S. Woodward
  - Phillip Cary
  - Robert R. Jores
- Messengers:
  - Samuel H. Fernandez
  - Carlton C. Hart
  - Edward Livingston
  - William H. Barnes
  - George W. Yout
  - William H. Bennett
