= Matteson =

Matteson may refer to:

== Places ==
- Matteson, Illinois
- Matteson, Wisconsin
- Matteson Township, Michigan

== Others ==
- Matteson (surname)
- Matteson station, a railway station in Illinois, United States
- Matteson M-1, American glider
