= Senator Fenton (disambiguation) =

Reuben Fenton (1819–1885) was a U.S. Senator from New York from 1869 to 1875. Senator Fenton may refer to:

- Daniel G. Fenton (1812–1851), Wisconsin State Senate
- Donovan Fenton (born 1988), New Hampshire State Senate
- William M. Fenton (1808–1871), Michigan State Senate
