= Eli Otis Rudd =

19th century American politician

Eli O. Rudd

Member of the Wisconsin State Assembly
- In office January 1, 1872 – January 6, 1873
- Preceded by: David D. Cheney (whole county)
- Succeeded by: James H. Allen
- Constituency: Monroe 1st
- In office January 3, 1859 – January 2, 1860
- Preceded by: Samuel Northrup
- Succeeded by: Edward Sumner
- Constituency: Sauk 2nd

Personal details
- Born: May 31, 1825 Willoughby, Ohio, U.S.
- Died: May 11, 1884 (aged 58) Reedsburg, Wisconsin, U.S.
- Resting place: Green Wood Cemetery, Reedsburg, Wisconsin
- Party: Republican
- Spouse: none
- Children: none
- Relatives: Rollin M. Strong (brother-in-law)

Eli Otis Rudd (May 31, 1825 – May 11, 1884) was an American businessman, politician, and Wisconsin pioneer. He was a member of the Wisconsin State Assembly for two terms, representing Sauk County in 1859 and representing Monroe County in 1872.

== Biography ==
Eli O. Rudd was born in Willoughby, Ohio, in May 1825. He received a common school education and came to Wisconsin with his mother, brother, and sister in 1849. They settled at Reedsburg, in Sauk County. His father and another brother later joined them in Wisconsin.

Rudd was one of the co-founders of the Sauk County Agricultural Society in 1855, and served on the first executive committee of the organization.

He was elected to the Wisconsin State Assembly in 1858, running on the Republican Party ticket. He represented Sauk County's 2nd Assembly district, which then comprised roughly the northern half of the county.

Rudd was appointed postmaster at Reedsburg in the spring of 1865, and remained in that office until 1869. In 1868 he was a co-founder of the first legitimate bank in Reedsburg, originally known as Mackey, Rudd & Co., but sold his share after just a few years. His brother later took over the bank. The Rudd brothers were also involved in the lumber business, and around 1870, Eli moved to Monroe County for this business. He established a small community known as "Rudd's Mills" at what was then the end of the West Wisconsin Railway. In 1871, Rudd was elected to the Assembly again, this time representing Monroe County's first Assembly district—the northern half of the county.

About 1877, Rudd returned to Reedsburg and resumed his ownership of the bank he had started in 1868. He died at Reedsburg in May 1884.

== Personal life and family ==
Eli Rudd was one of at least four children born to David Rudd and his wife Julia née Boies. Eli Rudd never married and had no known children.

His brother, David, took over his stake in the Reedsburg bank and was president of the bank until his death in 1896. He died a millionaire.

His sister, Sara, who came with him to Reedsburg in 1849, married Rollin M. Strong, a prominent pioneer of Sauk County.

Wisconsin State Assembly
Preceded by Samuel Northrup	Member of the Wisconsin State Assembly from the Sauk 2nd district January 3, 1859 – January 2, 1860	Succeeded by Edward Sumner
Preceded by David D. Cheney (whole county)	Member of the Wisconsin State Assembly from the Monroe 1st district January 1, 1872 – January 6, 1873	Succeeded by James H. Allen
