= Senator Silver =

Senator Silver may refer to:

- Benjamin Silver Jr. (died 1890), Maryland State Senate
- Gray Silver (1870–1935), West Virginia State Senate

== See also ==
- Lion Silverman (1818–1894), Wisconsin State Senate
