= Andrew Blair =

Andrew Blair may refer to:

- Andrew George Blair (1844–1907), Canadian politician
- Andrew M. Blair (1818–after 1891), American politician in Wisconsin
- Andy Blair (ice hockey) (1908–1977), Canadian hockey player
- Andy Blair (footballer) (born 1959), Scottish former footballer
- Andrew Blair (1849–1885), Scottish medical doctor and author of Annals of the Twenty-Ninth Century
