= Matteson (surname) =

Matteson is a surname. Notable people with the surname include:

- Bob Matteson (born 1952), American soccer player
- C. V. Matteson (1861–1931), American baseball player
- Charles Matteson (1840–1925), Rhode Island Supreme Court Justice
- Charles Matteson (1913–??), Canadian rower
- Eddie Matteson (1884–1943), American baseball player
- Joel Aldrich Matteson (1808–1873), American politician
- John Matteson (born 1961), American writer and academic
- Michael Matteson, Australian activist
- Orsamus B. Matteson (1805–1889), American lawyer and politician
- Rich Matteson (1929–1993), American jazz composer and educator
- Silas Matteson, American politician
- Steve Matteson (born 1965), American typographer
- T. H. Matteson (1813–1884), American painter
- Thomas T. Matteson (born 1935), Rear Admiral (United States)
- Troy Matteson (born 1979), American golfer
