= Daniel G. Fenton =

American politician (1812–1851)

Member of the Wisconsin Senate from the 3rd district
- In office June 5, 1848 – January 1, 1849
- Preceded by: Position established
- Succeeded by: James Fisher

Personal details
- Born: January 11, 1812 New Jersey, U.S.
- Died: August 11, 1851 (aged 39) Prairie du Chien, Wisconsin
- Resting place: Calvary Cemetery, Prairie du Chien, Wisconsin
- Party: Democratic
- Spouse: Madeline Fisher (m. 1850–1851)

Daniel G. Fenton (January 11, 1812 – August 11, 1851) was an American lawyer and politician who served in the 1st Wisconsin State Senate. A Democrat, he represented the 3rd senatorial district, which at the time comprised the counties of Chippewa, Crawford, La Pointe, and St. Croix. In 1848, those four counties made up the entire northwestern quadrant of the state.

Wisconsin Senate District 3 in 1848.

== Background ==
Fenton was born in New Jersey (as of 1815, his mother was alive and living in Trenton) and educated in Pennsylvania. He arrived in Wisconsin Territory in 1836, practicing law first at Mineral Point before removing to Prairie du Chien, where he lived the rest of his life.

== Public office ==
Fenton was clerk of court for Crawford County when he was chosen as the delegate to the Wisconsin Territory's Second Constitutional Convention from Chippewa and Crawford Counties, replacing Peter A. R. Brace. At the convention, he advocated a western boundary for Wisconsin deep into the Minnesota country, running from the rapids of the St. Louis River above Duluth-Superior southwest to the juncture of the Rum River with the Mississippi, and thence to the Illinois line. (This wedge of additional territory included the sites of St. Paul and Stillwater, and indeed the entire St. Croix Valley.) This motion passed in the Convention by a 53–3 margin, but was eventually rejected by Congress in favor of the present boundary line. The most extensive analysis of this effort points out surviving letters demonstrating that Fenton was an ally of Hercules Dousman and hoped that the advocates for a Minnesota Territory would push for cession of Dakota Indian lands, thus providing the Dakota with money to pay debts owed to Dousman.

Fenton later was elected as county judge in Crawford County, and held that office at the time of his death on August 11, 1851, in Prairie du Chien, "aged 39 year and 7 months". He is referred to in the headline of the announcement as "Col. DANIEL G. FENTON". His wife Madeline is reported to have left Prairie du Chien, and possibly Wisconsin, soon after his death.

== Identity question ==
It is unclear whether this is the same Daniel G. Fenton, a lawyer from New Jersey, who spent some time between 1830 and 1836 practicing law in Clearfield County, Pennsylvania. The 1887 History of Clearfield County described him thus, "Daniel G. Fenton came, a single man, from New Jersey, and was admitted to practice at the courts of the county. He came here about 1830, and left somewhat hurriedly in 1836. The circumstances of his leaving were about as follows : He had become considerably involved with debts variously contracted, and, in order to escape from his creditors, sold his law books to John R. Bloom, a merchant of the town, and in the night time decamped, using the proceeds of the sale of his library to take him away. He went to Iowa, where he afterward died. Mr. Fenton was a weak lawyer, but very popular in the town."

Wisconsin Senate
State government established	Member of the Wisconsin Senate from the 3rd district June 5, 1848 – January 1, 1849	Succeeded by James Fisher
