= Hugh Cunning =

19th century American politician

Member of the Wisconsin Senate from the 3rd district
- In office January 7, 1861 – January 5, 1863
- Preceded by: Frederick Hilgen
- Succeeded by: John R. Bohan

Personal details
- Born: March 22, 1824 Pittsburgh, Pennsylvania, U.S.
- Died: January 31, 1892 (aged 67) Cook County, Illinois, U.S.
- Resting place: Calvary Cemetery, Evanston, Illinois
- Party: Democratic
- Spouse: Catharine Kenna (m. 1856–1892)
- Children: Mary Ellen Cunning^{(b. 1857; died 1876)}; Agatha (Moran)^{(b. 1858; died 1925)}; John Cunning^{(b. 1860; died 1922)}; Thomas Cunning^{(b. 1862)}; Charles Hugh Cunning^{(b. 1864; died 1932)}; William Hugh Cunning^{(b. 1866; died 1900)}; Francis Hugh Cunning^{(b. 1868; died 1897)}; Michael Hugh Cunning^{(b. 1870; died 1908)}; Frank Cummings^{(b. 1874)}; Grace (Ames)^{(b. 1875; died 1944)}; George Albert Cunning^{(b. 1878; died 1923)}
- Profession: Lawyer

Hugh Cunning (March 22, 1824 – January 31, 1892) was an American lawyer, Democratic politician, and Wisconsin pioneer. He was a member of the Wisconsin Senate, representing Ozaukee County during the 1861 and 1862 sessions.

== Biography ==
Hugh Cunning was born in Pittsburgh, Pennsylvania, in March 1824. His education began at age five in the schools of Pittsburgh, but after two years his father moved the family to a farm where there were fewer educational resources. Nevertheless, Cunning invested in his studies and by age 16 he was qualified to teach common school courses. After raising money from two terms teaching, he traveled west through the state of Illinois and the territories of Wisconsin and Iowa. Cunning was so impressed that he decided to persuade his father to move west. His father, however, did not want to move out into territory so close to the Native American population, but he did move several miles further west, to a new farm in Beaver, Pennsylvania. Cunning worked on that farm alongside his father in the Summers, and in the Winter he continued his private studies.

In 1850, he began studying law in the offices of S. B. Wilson, in Beaver. After two years, he passed the bar and was admitted to practice law. He immediately moved west to Port Washington, in what is now Ozaukee County, Wisconsin, where he established his legal practice.

In 1859, he was named collector of customs at the port of Port Washington, but declined the office. The following year he was the Democratic Party nominee for Wisconsin Senate in the 3rd Senate district. His district at the time comprised just Ozaukee County. He defeated Republican Shepherd E. Moore in the 1860 general election, and he went on to serve in the 1861 and 1862 legislative sessions.

Throughout his political career in Wisconsin, Cunning also remained active in his legal practice. His most noteworthy case came in the midst of the draft for the American Civil War. In partnership with future Wisconsin chief justice, Edward George Ryan, he took on the defense of 130 German American draftees in Ozaukee County who were held in military custody, accused of participating in riots against the fairness of the conscription process. Responding to the petitions of Cunning and Ryan, the Wisconsin Supreme Court issued a writ of habeas corpus, and stated that the cases of the men accused of riotous behavior could only be adjudicated in a state civil or criminal court. The general in charge, Washington Lafayette Elliott, refused the court order, stating that President Lincoln's Order 141 made any person resisting the draft subject of martial law. The Wisconsin Supreme Court unanimously sided with the petitioners, stating that the President had no authority to suspend the right of habeas corpus.

In 1870, he left Wisconsin and opened a law office in Chicago. In Illinois, he stopped participating in politics and devoted his attention to his legal practice until his health began to fail in 1879.

In his later years, Cunning suffered from Epilepsy. He died in Cook County, Illinois, on January 31, 1892, and was interred at Calvary Cemetery in Evanston, Illinois.

== Personal life and family ==
Hugh Cunning was the eldest of eight children born to Patrick Cunning and his wife Elizabeth (née Nauvie), both Irish American immigrants. He was raised in Catholic Church.

Hugh Cunning married Catharine Kenna at Port Washington, Wisconsin, in 1856. Kenna was an Irish Canadian immigrant. They had at least twelve children together.

Wisconsin Senate
Preceded by Frederick Hilgen	Member of the Wisconsin Senate from the 3rd district January 7, 1861 – January 5, 1863	Succeeded by John R. Bohan
