= Lion Silverman =

19th century American politician

Member of the Wisconsin Senate from the 3rd district
- In office January 3, 1859 – October 1, 1859
- Preceded by: Herman J. Schulteis
- Succeeded by: Frederick Hilgen

Sheriff of Ozaukee County, Wisconsin
- In office February 10, 1854 – January 1, 1855
- Appointed by: William A. Barstow
- Preceded by: Benjamin F. Pidge
- Succeeded by: J. W. Lutfring

Sheriff of Washington County, Wisconsin
- In office January 1, 1853 – June 4, 1853
- Succeeded by: Joseph Schantz

Personal details
- Born: c.1818 Kingdom of Bavaria
- Died: April 27, 1894 (aged 75) Pine Bluff, Arkansas, U.S.
- Cause of death: Suicide
- Party: Democratic
- Spouse: Mary Troutman (m. 1841; died 1884)
- Children: J. Francis Silverman^{(b. 1843; died 1910)}; 7 others

Military service
- Allegiance: United States
- Branch/service: Wisconsin Militia
- Years of service: 1850s
- Rank: Captain
- Unit: Union Guards

Lion Silverman (c.1818 – April 27, 1894) (Note: Both the 1859 Wisconsin legislative manual and his obituaries imply a birth date in 1818 or early 1819; the legislative manual lists his age as 40 in early 1859; the obituaries say he was 75 as of his death on April 27, 1894.) was an American merchant and Wisconsin pioneer. He was born in the Kingdom of Bavaria and later immigrated to the United States. He was a member of the Wisconsin Senate, representing Ozaukee County during the 1859 session. He was also sheriff of Ozaukee County and also briefly of Washington County before the division of Ozaukee from Washington. He was also the Democratic nominee for State Treasurer of Wisconsin in the 1859 election. His first name was often alternatively spelled Lyon. His last name was also sometimes incorrectly written as "Silberman".

== Early life ==
Lion Silverman was born in the Kingdom of Bavaria about 1818. At age 13, he emigrated to the United States with his parents, settling first at Philadelphia, Pennsylvania. In Philadelphia, Lion began working as a merchant's apprentice. He moved to Mansfield, Ohio, about 1841, where he started his own merchant business. The exact circumstances are unclear, but his business failed after a short time, and caused some substantial collateral financial damage to the farmers of the community. Several of those impacted later wrote letters denouncing him. After his problems in Mansfield, he moved to Wooster, Ohio, where he met and married his wife Mary Troutman.

A few years after their marriage, Silverman moved his family to the Wisconsin Territory, settling in the town of Trenton, in Washington County. In 1852, he was elected chairman of the town of Trenton and was ex officio a member of the county board of supervisors.

== Washington County division controversy ==
Later that year, he was elected sheriff of Washington County—which then included all the present territory of Washington County plus what is now Ozaukee County—and moved to Port Washington, Wisconsin. Shortly after his election as sheriff, however, the voters elected to split the county. This resulted in some disputes over property and offices, since the government offices of Washington County were largely held in the territory that is now Ozaukee County. Silverman was still nominally the sheriff of Washington County, but he now lived in Ozaukee County, and attempted to act instead as sheriff of Ozaukee County.

The new county board of Washington County ordered that all of their officers and property should be removed to West Bend from Port Washington, but the only officer to comply was the register of deeds, Adam Schantz. The new Ozaukee County government obtained a short-term injunction preventing records from being removed from their Port Washington offices. Schantz sent a petition to their Wisconsin circuit court judge, Charles H. Larrabee, who at that time of year was holding court in Marquette County, far west of Washington and Ozaukee.

Larrabee granted Schantz's petition, dissolving the injunction, but because of the distance and the primitive communication options of the era, no one in Port Washington was aware the injunction had been lifted. This led to an altercation at the Port Washington offices when Schantz's agents arrived to claim their property. Silverman stopped them and, with a crowd of supporters, chased them out of town. The books and property subsequently disappeared. After this incident, Governor Leonard Farwell formally removed Silverman from office in June 1853 and appointed B. F. Pidge as sheriff of Ozaukee County.

Silverman, however, was returned to office in February 1854, when the new Democratic governor William A. Barstow appointed him sheriff of Ozaukee County and removed Pidge from office. Silverman did not run for re-election in 1854, and instead sought election to the Wisconsin Senate. He was defeated in the general election by the Anti-Nebraska Democrat Bolivar G. Gill.

During this time, Silverman had also begun operating a pier in Port Washington, and conducted freight forwarding business. He was named postmaster of Ozaukee in 1855, but resigned after less than a year in the job.

== Lynching of George De Bar ==
Also in the mid-1850s, Silverman was involved with the Wisconsin Militia and was captain of the "Union Guards" militia company based in Port Washington. In this role, he was involved in another significant scandal when the Union Guards were summoned to West Bend to provide security for a murder trial which had significantly inflamed the passions of the local community.

George De Bar was a Native American and a resident of the town of Barton. De Bar worked numerous odd jobs in the area, and came into conflict with a farmer named John Muehr over $1.50 in wages. On the night of August 1, 1855, De Bar went to Muehr's home to try to obtain the wages. According to the official records, after a disagreement, De Bar struck Muehr in the head and knocked him down a set of stairs. He then stabbed Muehr's wife and killed Muehr's 16-year-old son. De Bar then set the house on fire and fled. Muehr managed to recover from his injuries and saved his wife from the burning home.

De Bar was captured in Milwaukee and returned to West Bend for trial. The citizens of West Bend were infuriated by the circumstances of the murder and demanded the death of De Bar, despite Wisconsin having banned the death penalty in 1853. The population was also encouraged by a recent lynching which took place in Janesville, Wisconsin, where the lynch mob had not faced any punishment. A speedy trial was arranged for August 7 by circuit judge Charles H. Larrabee, who summoned two companies of militia from outside West Bend to keep the peace, one of which was Silverman's Union Guards.

Silverman's company arrived first, formed a perimeter around the courthouse, and guarded De Bar as he was escorted in. Larrabee then came out and addressed the crowd, attempting to cool off the situation. He then instructed Silverman to allow in a small number of the public to watch the trial. Silverman quickly allowed the mob to flood into the courthouse—it's not known if this was intentional or if the mob overwhelmed the guards. Inside the courthouse, the crowd became unruly and rushed toward the prisoner, only barely being stopped. De Bar was indicted for murder and entered a plea of not guilty. Larrabee directed that the prisoner should be held overnight for a trial to occur the following day. De Bar was escorted out of the courthouse, accompanied by a large number of militia, but while moving toward the jail a surge of the crowd seized De Bar—accounts state that the militia offered almost no resistance and later allegations rose that the militia had sympathized and collaborated with the mob. De Bar was thrown to the ground and beaten with stumps and stones. He was then dragged down the street, being kicked and pelted by the crowd. He was then hanged upside down from a tree for a short time, after which he was cut down and moved to another area, where he was hung by the neck until dead.

Silverman later attended a state militia convention, where he testified that the lynching of De Bar could have been prevented if the state had enacted a proper military law to organize and train the militia.

== Political career ==
Silverman was a strong supporter of William A. Barstow in both his 1853 and 1855 gubernatorial campaigns. At the 1857 Democratic state convention, Silverman's name was put in nomination for State Treasurer of Wisconsin, but withdrawn after coming in fifth in the informal balloting.

Silverman received the Democratic nomination for Wisconsin Senate in the 3rd State Senate district in 1858, and faced no opposition in the general election. In the Senate, he served on the committees on internal improvements and on the state prison.

He participated in all of the work of the 1859 legislative session, but resigned in the fall of 1859, after he was nominated for State Treasurer in the 1859 election. His nomination was seen as an attempt to strengthen the ticket with the German voters of the state. He challenged the incumbent state treasurer Samuel D. Hastings, but fell far short in the general election. The entire Democratic ticket was defeated, but Silverman ran about 5,000 votes behind the other Democratic statewide candidates.

== Later years ==
Just after the start of the Civil War, Silverman lost election as chairman of the town of Ozaukee. Silverman subsequently accepted a commission to form a company of volunteers for the Union Army, but he never personally went into the service. His pier was destroyed by a storm that winter, essentially terminating his business. He moved to Chicago shortly after that disaster. He remained only a few years though, moving south to Bond County, Illinois, where he was convicted of selling liquor in violation of federal laws. He subsequently lived for a few years in Rockaway, Queens.

== Personal life and family ==
Silverman was Jewish. He married Mary Troutman in August 1841; she subsequently converted to Judaism and embraced the religion. They had eight children together.

Later in life, as his wife's health began failing, she asked that they move to Arkansas to be closer to their children. They went to live with their son, J. Francis "Frank" Silverman, in Pine Bluff, Arkansas, where Frank had become a prominent citizen and was elected as sheriff and county judge. Mary Silverman died shortly after their arrival, in April 1884.

His health declined following her death, until April 27, 1894, when Silverman killed himself. He shot himself twice—once in the chest and once in the head.

== Electoral history ==
=== Wisconsin Senate (1854) ===
Wisconsin Senate, 3rd District Election, 1854
Party	Candidate	Votes	%	±%
General Election, November 7, 1854
Democratic	Bolivar G. Gill	889	64.51%	
Democratic	Lion Silverman	489	35.49%	
Plurality		400	29.03%	
Total votes		1,378	100.0%	

=== Wisconsin State Treasurer (1859) ===
Wisconsin State Treasurer Election, 1859
Party	Candidate	Votes	%	±%
General Election, November 8, 1859
Republican	Samuel D. Hastings (incumbent)	65,473	54.48%	+4.25%
Democratic	Lion Silverman	54,710	45.52%	
Plurality		10,763	8.96%	+8.50%
Total votes		120,183	100.0%	+35.04%

== Notes ==
Party political offices
Preceded by Carl Habich	Democratic nominee for State Treasurer of Wisconsin; 1859	Succeeded by Lucas M. Miller
Wisconsin Senate
Preceded by Herman J. Schulteis	Member of the Wisconsin Senate from the 3rd district January 3, 1859 – October 1, 1859	Succeeded by Frederick Hilgen
Legal offices
Preceded by	Sheriff of Washington County, Wisconsin; January 1, 1853 – June 4, 1853	Succeeded by Joseph Schantz
Preceded by Benjamin F. Pidge	Sheriff of Ozaukee County, Wisconsin; February 10, 1854 – January 1, 1855	Succeeded by J. W. Lutfring
