= Meredith Howland (Wisconsin pioneer) =

Wisconsin pioneer (1822-1869)

Member of the Wisconsin State Assembly from the Kenosha 1st district
- In office January 2, 1860 – January 7, 1861
- Preceded by: George Bennett
- Succeeded by: Michael Frank

Surveyor of Kenosha County, Wisconsin
- In office January 1851 – January 1855
- Preceded by: Position established

Personal details
- Born: 1822 Ohio, U.S.
- Died: April 21, 1869 (aged 46–47) Somers, Wisconsin, U.S.
- Resting place: Kenosha County, Wisconsin
- Party: Republican; Free Soil (1852–1854); Democratic (before 1852)
- Spouse: Amelia C. Larabee (m. 1864–1869)
- Children: Kate Lucy (Piper)^{(b. 1864; died 1947)}; Winslow M. Howland^{(b. 1867; died 1904)}

Meredith Howland (1822 – April 21, 1869) was an American farmer, surveyor, politician, and Wisconsin pioneer. With his parents and siblings, he was one of the earliest American settlers in what is now Kenosha County, Wisconsin. He represented eastern Kenosha County in the Wisconsin State Assembly for the 13th Wisconsin Legislature (1860), and served as the first county surveyor of Kenosha County (1851–1855). Politically, he was originally a member of the Democratic Party, and was first elected surveyor on the Democratic ticket in 1850; he went with other Free Democrats to the Free Soil Party in 1852, and ultimately became a Republican when that part was created in 1854.

== Biography ==
Meredith Howland was born in Ohio in 1822. As a child, he moved with his parents to the Wisconsin Territory, settling in what is now Kenosha County, Wisconsin, in 1835, and becoming some of the earliest American settlers in that area. He worked on his father's farm and attended Louis P. Harvey's academy in Southport (now Kenosha, Wisconsin).

As a young man, Howland became active in politics with the Democratic Party. In 1850, when Kenosha County was created, he was elected county surveyor in the first county election, running on the Democratic Party ticket. His time as surveyor coincided with an internal battle in the Democratic Party of Wisconsin over the federal issue of slavery; the "Free Democrats" had the upper hand in 1850, but split from the party in 1852, incorporating with the Free Soil Party. Howland went with the Free Democrats, and was nominated and elected for a second term as surveyor on the Free Democrat ticket in 1852.

When the Republican Party was organized in 1854, Howland became a member of the new party. In 1858, he sought the Republican nomination for Wisconsin State Assembly in Kenosha County's 1st district, but the convention selected George Bennett instead, by a vote of 10 to 8. Bennett won the election, and a year later he ran for Wisconsin Senate. In his place, Howland was nominated for Assembly in 1859, and won the general election, going on to represent Kenosha in the 13th Wisconsin Legislature.

During the American Civil War, Howland was selected for the draft, but was not conscripted for service due to his age and marital status. Howland suffered financial difficulties after the war. He died of Pneumonia at his home in Somers, Wisconsin, on April 21, 1869.

== Personal life and family ==
Meredith Howland was the second of nine children born to Thomas Howland and his wife Elizabeth (née Husbands). Thomas Howland was a well known settler in early Kenosha; he owned property along what is now 22nd Avenue—the road was named "Howland Avenue" until the 1920s. The Howland family were descendants of the Quaker colonist Henry Howland (brother of John Howland), who settled in the Plymouth Colony sometime before 1632.

Meredith's elder brother, Lewis, who had settled land in Pleasant Prairie, Wisconsin, died in 1856. Their younger brothers, twins Ichabod and Levi Howland, both volunteered for service in the Union Army with the 1st Wisconsin Cavalry Regiment. Ichabod died at the Battle of Resaca, Levi was promoted to major and commended for gallantry at Anderson's Cross Roads. Their youngest brother, Alfred, also served with the 1st Wisconsin Cavalry.

Meredith Howland married Amelia Larabee on January 7, 1864; they had two children together before his death in 1869.

Howland's only son, Winslow M. Howland, served with the 1st Idaho Infantry Regiment in the Spanish–American War.

Wisconsin State Assembly
Preceded by George Bennett	Member of the Wisconsin State Assembly from the Kenosha 1st district January 2, 1860 – January 7, 1861	Succeeded by Michael Frank
