= Andrew M. Blair =

19th century American politician

A. M. Blair
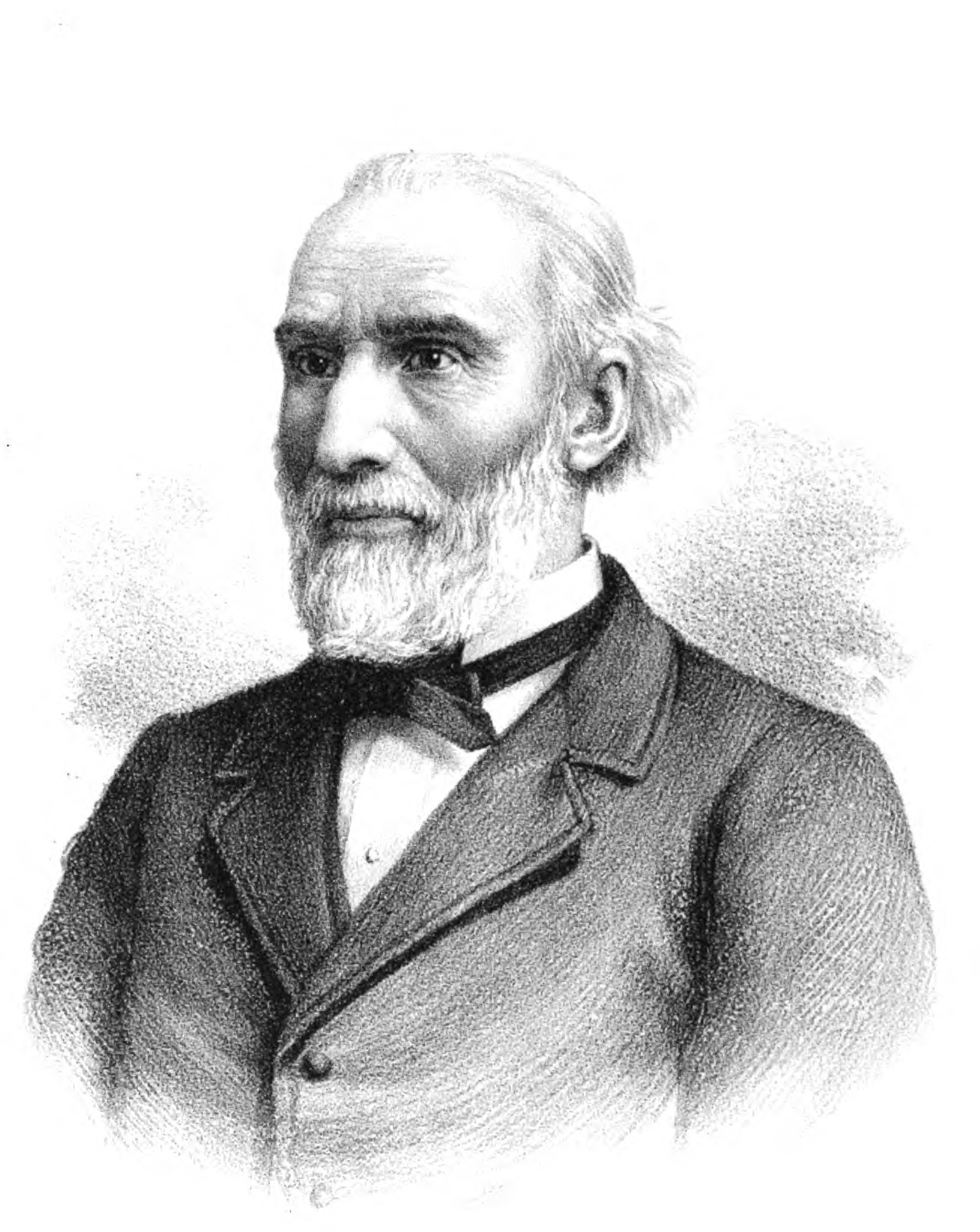
- From Portrait and biographical album of Fond du Lac County, Wisconsin (1889)

Member of the Wisconsin Senate from the 3rd district
- In office January 3, 1853 – January 1, 1855
- Preceded by: Hiram A. Wright
- Succeeded by: Bolivar G. Gill

Personal details
- Born: April 1818 Stannard, Vermont, U.S.
- Died: After 1891
- Party: Democratic (before 1856 & after 1875); Liberal Rep. (1872–1875); Republican (1856–1872)
- Spouse: Caroline Hall Tuttle (m. 1852)
- Profession: Lawyer

Andrew M. Blair (April 1818 – after 1891) was an American lawyer, politician, and Wisconsin pioneer. He served in the Wisconsin State Senate, representing Ozaukee County.

== Biography ==
Andrew Blair was born in Stannard, Vermont, in April 1818. He was raised on his father's farm and attended the Newbury Seminary, then spent one year studying at the University of Vermont. He read law in the office of attorney Thomas Bartlett, in Lyndon, Vermont, and was admitted to the bar in December 1843. He practiced law in Hardwick, Vermont, for five years before deciding to move west to the new state of Wisconsin.

In June 1849, he settled at Port Washington, Wisconsin, in what would soon become Ozaukee County—at the time, this area was part of Washington County. He established a legal practice in Port Washington and quickly became involved in local affairs. He was elected to the Wisconsin State Senate in 1852, running on the Democratic Party ticket. During his term, Ozaukee County was created from the towns which made up his Senate district.

In 1854, he was the Democratic nominee for Wisconsin circuit court in the 3rd circuit, but was defeated by incumbent Charles H. Larrabee.

Blair subsequently joined the new Republican Party shortly after its formation in 1854. He remained a Republican through the Civil War, supporting Lincoln and Grant, but then joined the Liberal Republican Party in 1872, and subsequently rejoined the Democratic Party when the Liberal Republican Party dissolved.

During the Civil War, Blair was caught up in the Ozaukee Draft Riot. Blair was originally suggested to Governor Salomon as a good candidate for draft commissioner in Ozaukee County, but did not receive the appointment. The man who was appointed drew the wrath of the public with a selection process that seemed to excuse the wealthy. On the day of the draft, a mob descended on the draft office and destroyed the draft rolls. They then destroyed the home of the draft commissioner and the homes of several other prominent masons in the city, including Andrew Blair. Blair received $1,200 compensation from the Wisconsin Legislature in the 1863 session.

He relocated to the city of Fond du Lac, Wisconsin, in the Spring of 1863, and became a prominent lawyer there. He served for many years as a justice of the peace, police justice, and circuit court commissioner. He can be found as a frequent litigant before the Wisconsin Supreme Court with the legal partnerships Blair & Lord and later Blair & Coleman.

== Personal life and family ==
Andrew M. Blair was one of eight children born to Andrew Blair and his wife Elizabeth (née Reynolds—sometimes spelled Runnels or Ronnalds). The grandfather of Andrew M. Blair was Robert Blair, a Scottish American immigrant who established a farm in Caledonia County, Vermont.

Several of Andrew M. Blair's siblings also settled in Wisconsin in the early years of the state. His older brother Robert lived for some time in Sheboygan, Wisconsin, before moving to Virginia, and his brother Alexander and sister Eliza lived the rest of their lives at La Crosse, Wisconsin.

Andrew Blair married Caroline Tuttle at Detroit, Michigan, in 1852. Caroline Tuttle was the daughter of David Tuttle of Hardwick, Vermont. There were no known children from this marriage.

== Electoral history ==
=== Wisconsin circuit court (1854) ===
Wisconsin Circuit Court, 3rd Circuit Election, 1854
Party	Candidate	Votes	%	±%
General Election, April 4, 1854
Independent Democrat	Charles H. Larrabee (incumbent)	5,486	50.93%	
Whig	Henry S. Baird	3,002	27.87%	
Democratic	Andrew M. Blair	2,284	21.20%	
Plurality		2,484	23.06%	
Total votes		10,772	100.0%	
Democratic hold				

Wisconsin Senate
Preceded by Hiram A. Wright	Member of the Wisconsin Senate from the 3rd district January 3, 1853 – January 1, 1855	Succeeded by Bolivar G. Gill
