= Herman J. Schulteis =

19th century American politician

Member of the Wisconsin Senate from the 3rd district
- In office January 5, 1857 – January 3, 1859
- Preceded by: Bolivar G. Gill
- Succeeded by: Lion Silverman

Register of Deeds of Ozaukee County, Wisconsin
- In office January 1, 1853 – January 1, 1857
- Preceded by: Position established
- Succeeded by: Peter Spehn

Personal details
- Born: Hermann Josef von Schultheiß; April 16, 1818 Rheinbach, Province of Jülich-Cleves-Berg, Kingdom of Prussia
- Died: January 14, 1889 (aged 70) Washington, D.C., U.S.
- Resting place: Saint Mary's Catholic Cemetery, Washington, D.C.
- Party: Democratic
- Spouse: Margaretha Merkel (m. 1846–1889)
- Children: 10

Military service
- Allegiance: United States
- Branch/service: United States Volunteers; Union Army
- Years of service: 1862–1864
- Rank: 1st Lieutenant, USV
- Unit: 1st Reg. Wis. Vol. Cavalry
- Battles/wars: American Civil War

Herman Joseph Schulteis (born Hermann Josef von Schultheiß; April 16, 1818 – January 14, 1889) was a German American immigrant, politician, and Wisconsin pioneer. He was a member of the Wisconsin Senate, representing Ozaukee County during the 1857 and 1858 sessions. His name was also sometimes incorrectly spelled "Schulties", "Schultes", or "Schultis".

== Biography ==
Herman J. Schulteis was born Hermann Josef von Schultheiß in Rheinbach, in what is now western Germany. At the time of his birth, it was the Province of Jülich-Cleves-Berg in the Kingdom of Prussia, and shortly after his birth that province was folded into the Rhine Province.

He emigrated to the United States in the Summer of 1845, landing at the Port of New York. He quickly moved to Milwaukee in the Wisconsin Territory, where he became part of a growing German emigrant community. Sometime prior to 1853, he moved north into what is now Ozaukee County. When Ozaukee County was first organized as a separate county, he was elected the first register of deeds of the new county, and served four years in the role.

In 1856, he was the Democratic nominee for Wisconsin Senate in the 3rd Senate district, which then comprised just Ozaukee County. He defeated Republican Alfred Lamberson in the general election, and went on to serve in the 1857 and 1858 legislative sessions.

He did not run for re-election in 1858, but in 1860 he served on the elector slate for Southern Democratic presidential nominee John C. Breckinridge. Wisconsin voted for Abraham Lincoln.

During the second year of the American Civil War, he joined the Union Army as a hospital aide in the 1st Wisconsin Cavalry Regiment. After about a year he was promoted to first lieutenant and regimental commissary officer, but retired due to poor health in March 1864. (Note: I'm pretty sure this info is correct, despite the Roster listing him as "Hiram J. Schulties". The service-years, regiment, and role match other source descriptions of his role in the Civil War.)

Sometime before 1887, Schulteis was appointed to a position in the United States Department of the Interior and moved with his wife to Washington, D.C. He died at his home in Washington on January 14, 1889.

== Personal life and family ==
Schulteis married Margareta Merkel, an immigrant from Bavaria, in Milwaukee's St. Peter German Catholic Congregation Church in 1846. They had 10 children together. Their seventh child, Herman Jr., after obtaining his law degree became locally infamous in Washington, D.C., in the early part of the 20th century as a scam artist who, along with a longtime partner, claimed to be influential lobbyists. They participated in several labor demonstrations, and were organizers of a Labor Peace Council during World War I, which was alleged to have been part of a German propaganda campaign. Schulteis and his partners were indicted in 1915, several were convicted but Schulteis escaped punishment.

== Notes ==
Wisconsin Senate
| Preceded by Bolivar G. Gill | Member of the Wisconsin Senate from the 3rd district January 5, 1857 – January 3, 1859 | Succeeded by Lion Silverman |
Political offices
| New county government | Register of Deeds of Ozaukee County, Wisconsin; January 1, 1853 – January 1, 1857 | Succeeded by Peter Spehn |
