= Wisconsin's 3rd Senate district =

American legislative district for Milwaukee, Wisconsin

Wisconsin's 3rd State Senate district
- 2024 map defined in 2023 Wisc. Act 94; 2022 map defined in Johnson v. Wisconsin Elections Commission; 2011 map was defined in 2011 Wisc. Act 43 composed of Assembly districts 7, 8, and 9
Senator
Tim Carpenter; D–Milwaukee
since January 3, 2003 (23 years, 310 days)
- Demographics: 39.88% White; 9.16% Black; 45.24% Hispanic; 5.11% Asian; 3.77% Native American; 0.16% Hawaiian/Pacific Islander
- Population (2020) • Voting age: 178,033; 128,718
- Website: Official website
- Notes: South side of Milwaukee

The 3rd Senate district of Wisconsin is one of 33 districts in the Wisconsin Senate. Located in southeast Wisconsin, the district is entirely contained within central Milwaukee County. It comprises much of the south side of the city of Milwaukee, as well as the village of West Milwaukee and eastern parts of the cities of West Allis and Greenfield. The district contains landmarks such as American Family Field (home of the Milwaukee Brewers), Walker's Point Historic District, the Mitchell Park Domes, and the historic Forest Home Cemetery. The district also contains the largest concentration of Hispanic residents in Wisconsin, at 45% of the district population.

== Current elected officials ==
Tim Carpenter is the senator representing the 3rd district. He was first elected in the 2002 general election, and is now serving his sixth term. Before being elected senator, he was a member of the Wisconsin State Assembly from 1985 to 2003.

Each Wisconsin State Senate district is composed of three State Assembly districts. The 3rd Senate district comprises the 7th, 8th, and 9th Assembly districts. The current representatives of those districts are:

- Assembly District 7: Karen Kirsch (D–Greenfield)
- Assembly District 8: Sylvia Ortiz-Velez (D–Milwaukee)
- Assembly District 9: Priscilla Prado (D–Milwaukee)

The district is mostly located within Wisconsin's 4th congressional district, which is represented by U.S. Representative Gwen Moore. The portion of the district in Greenfield falls within Wisconsin's 5th congressional district, represented by Scott Fitzgerald.

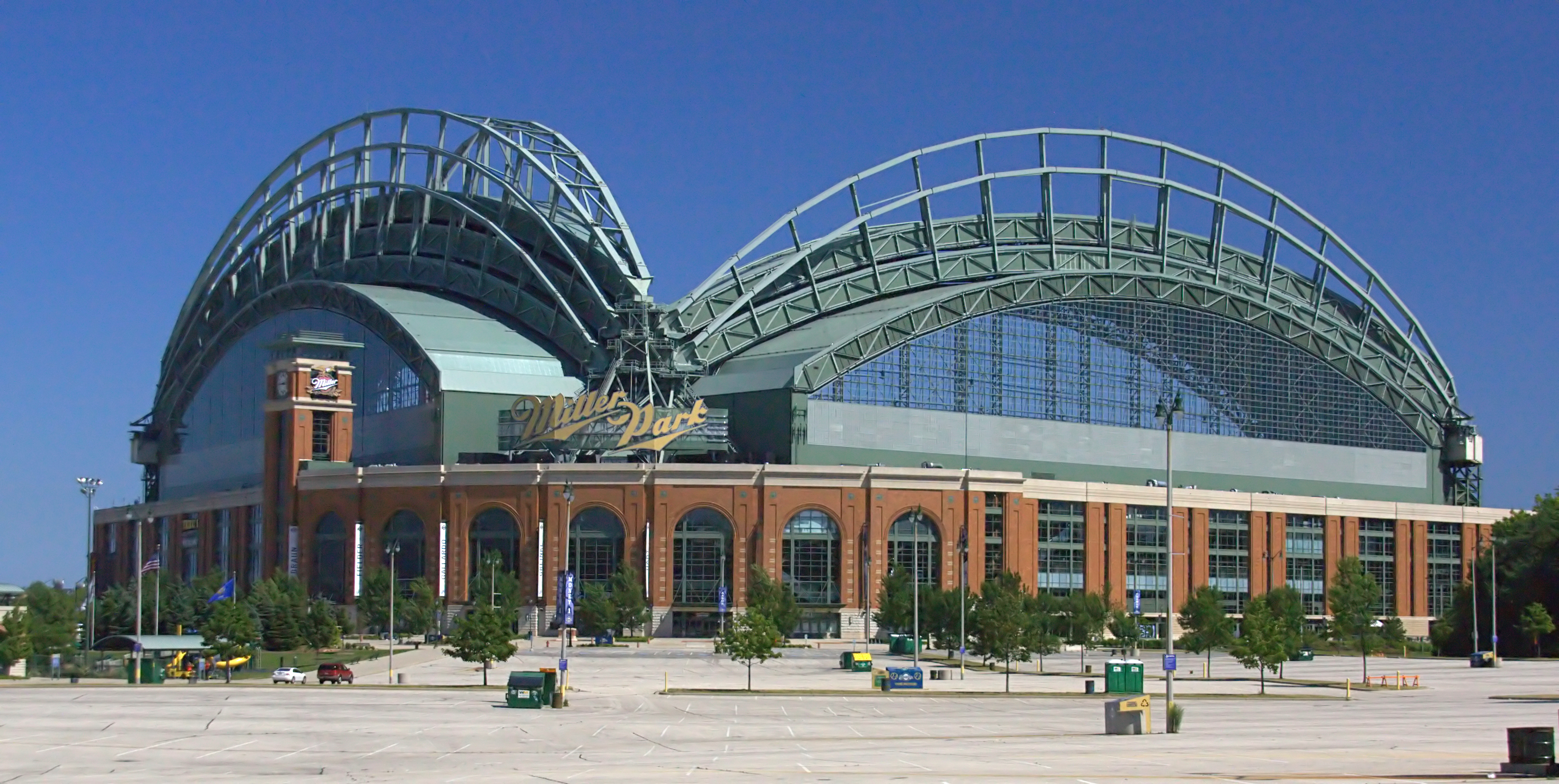
American Family Field

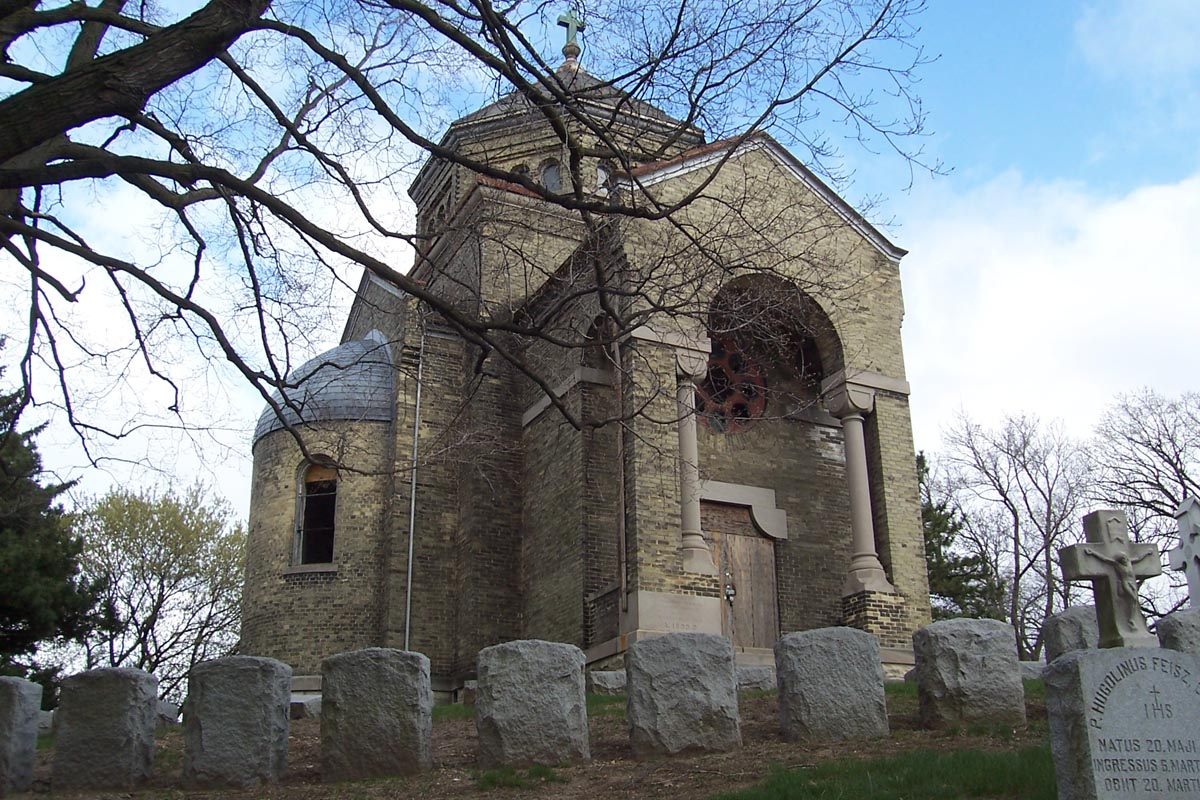
Chapel hill in Calvary Cemetery

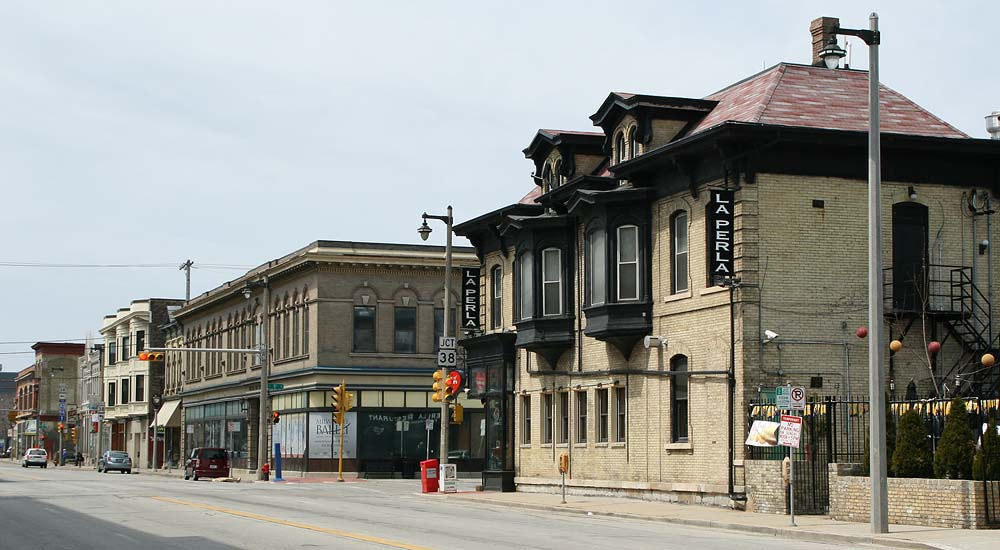
Walker's Point Historic District

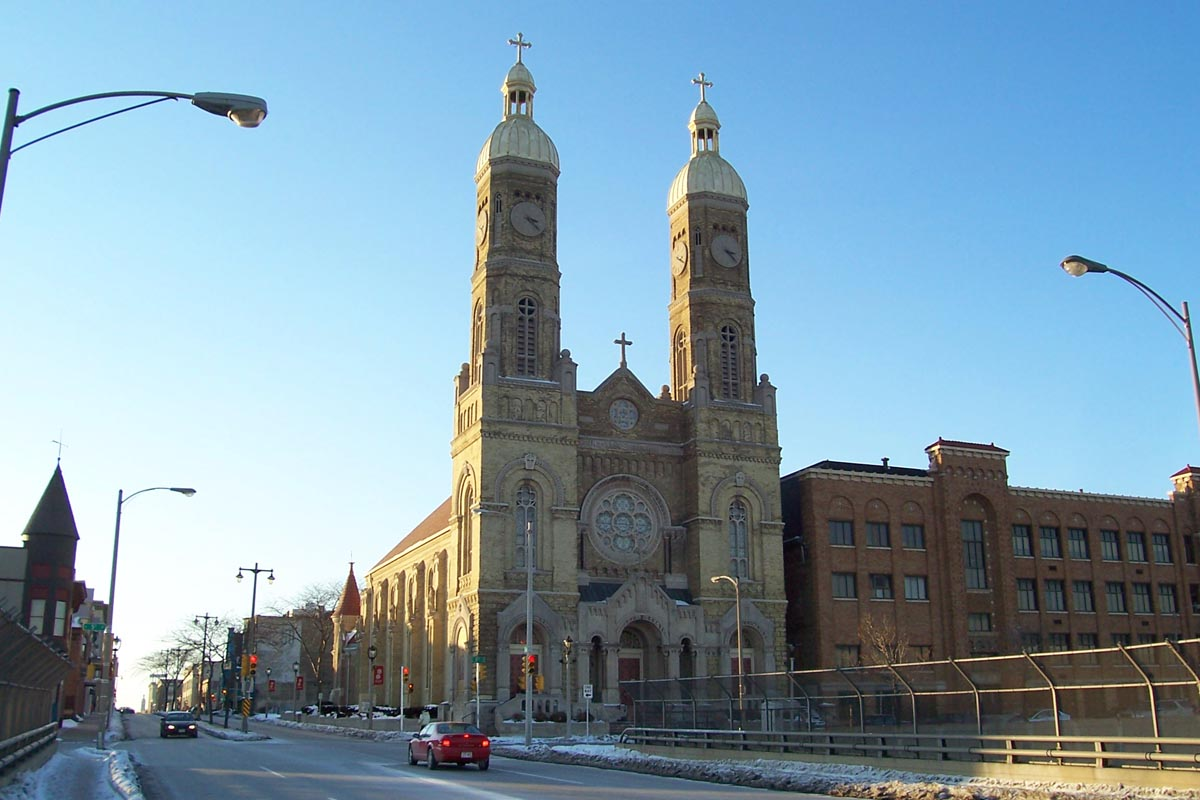
St. Stanislaus Catholic Church

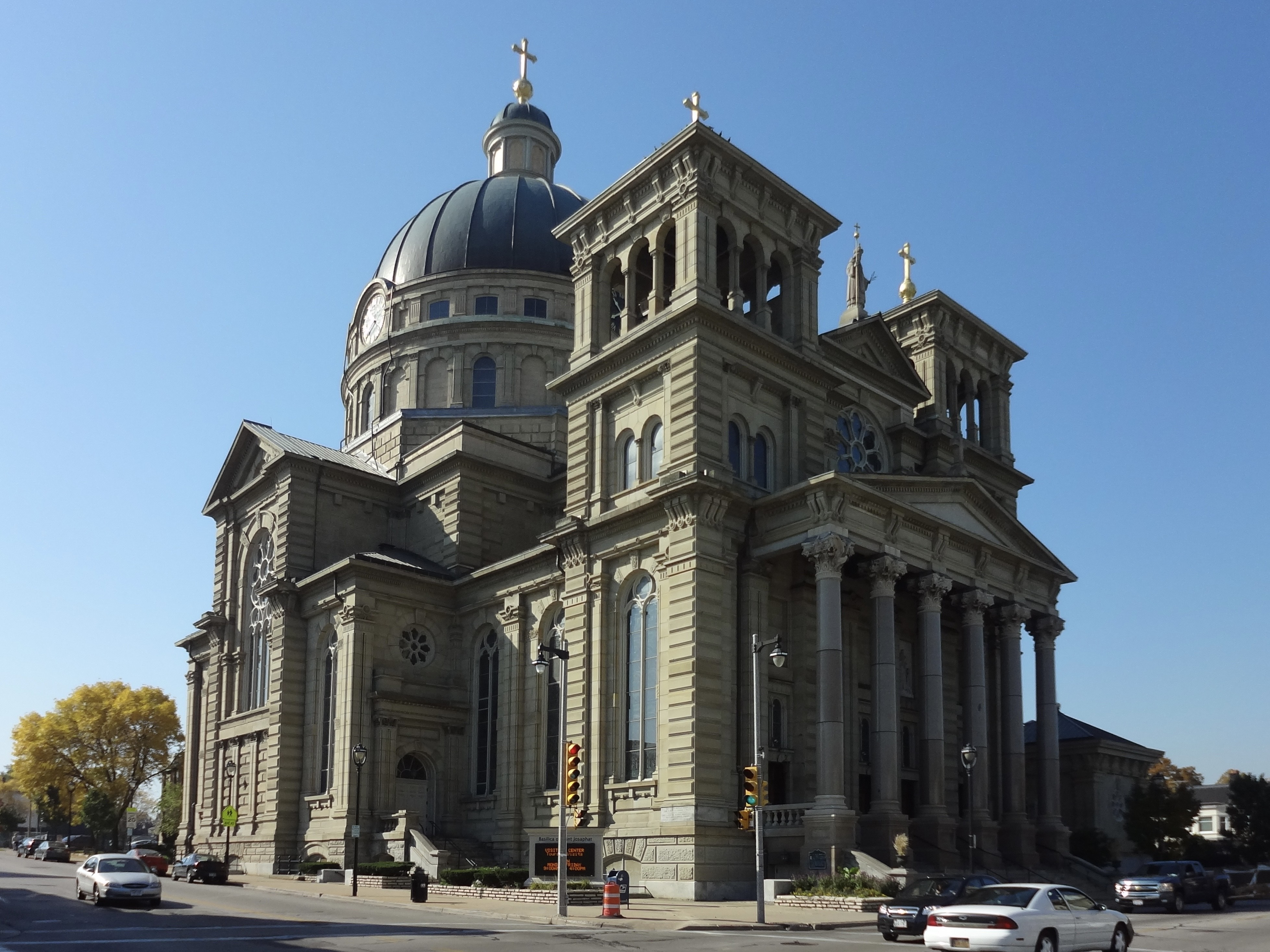
Basilica of St. Josaphat

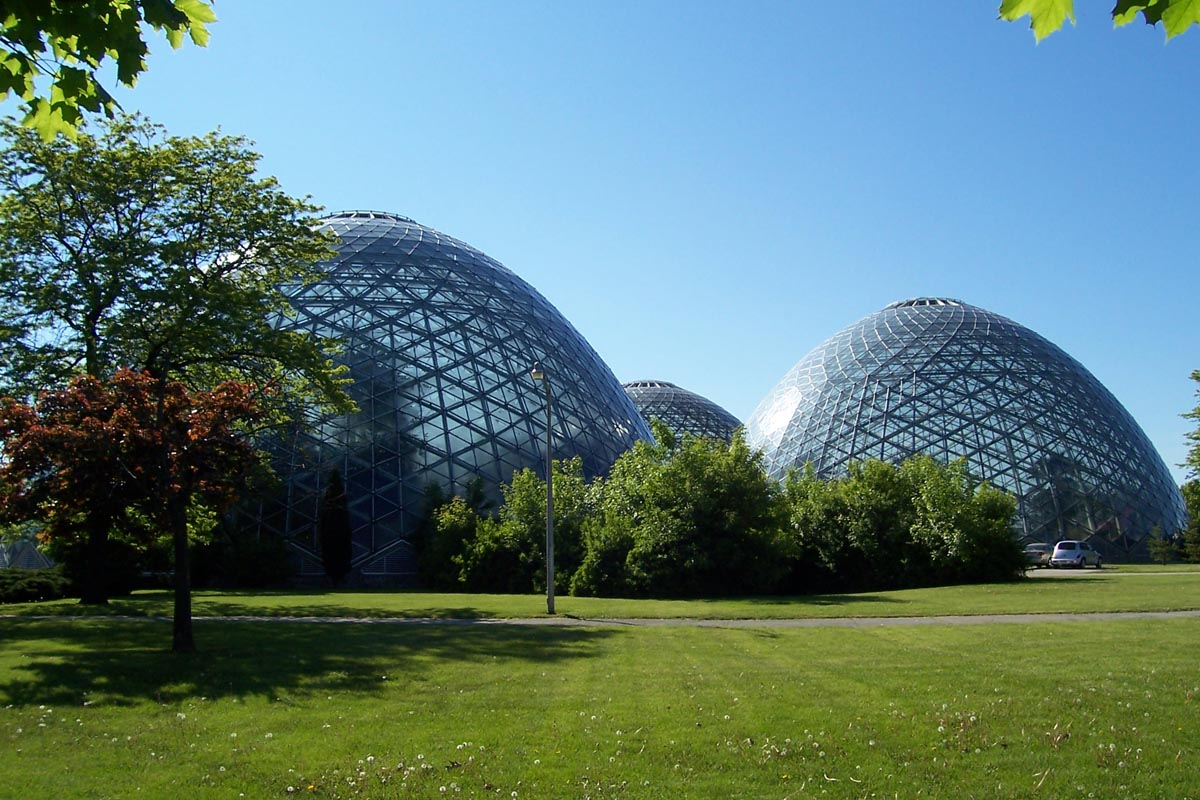
Mitchell Park Horticultural Conservatory

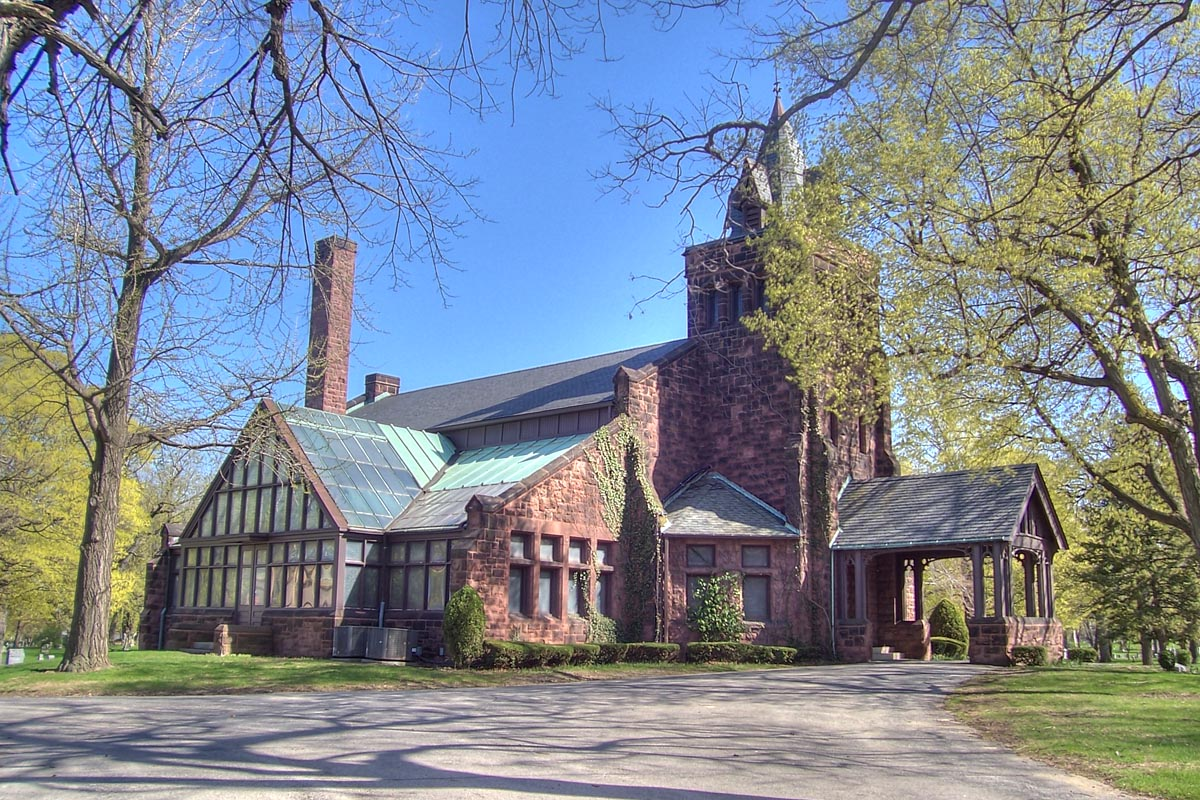
Landmark chapel in Forest Home Cemetery

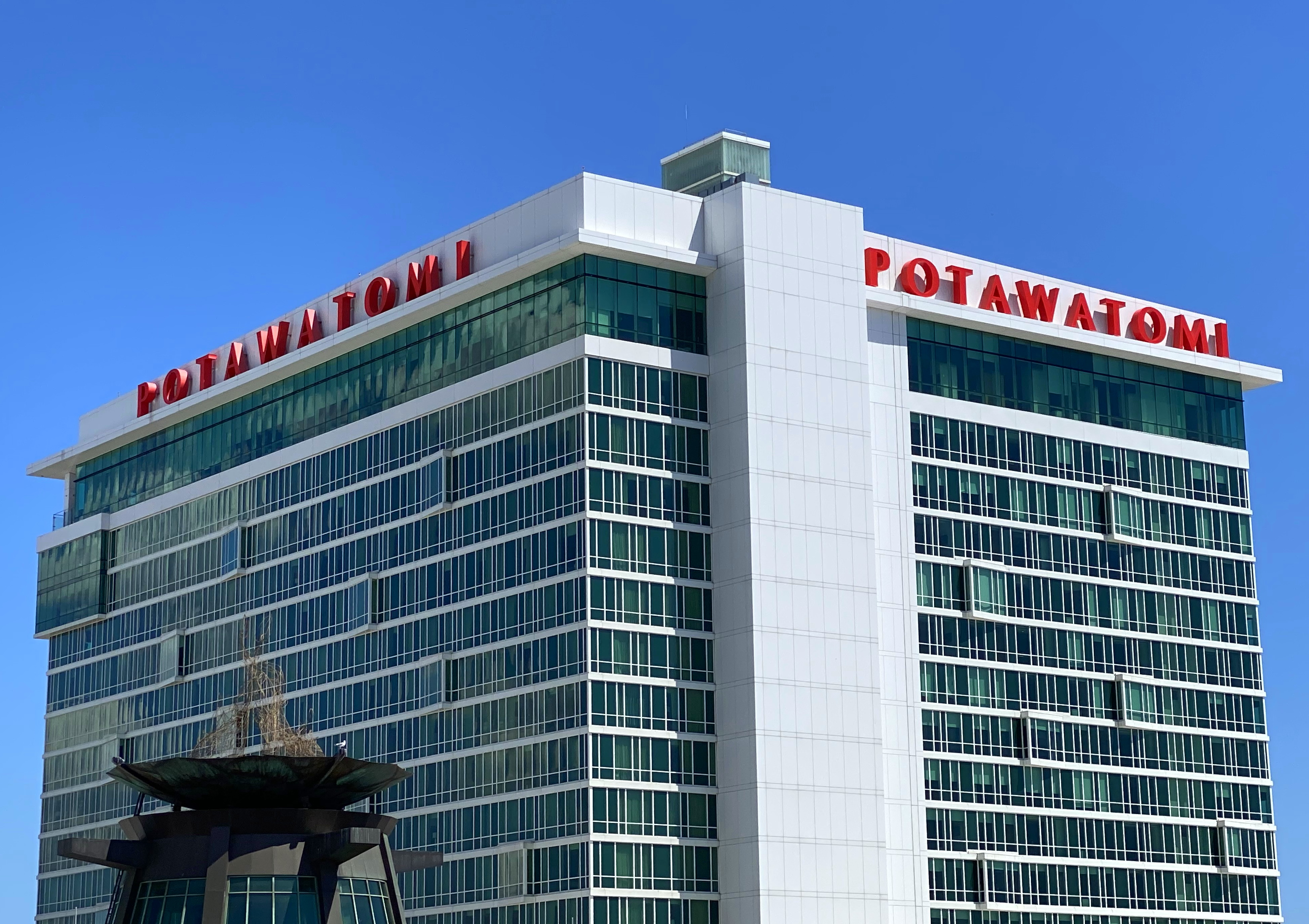
Potawatomi Hotel & Casino

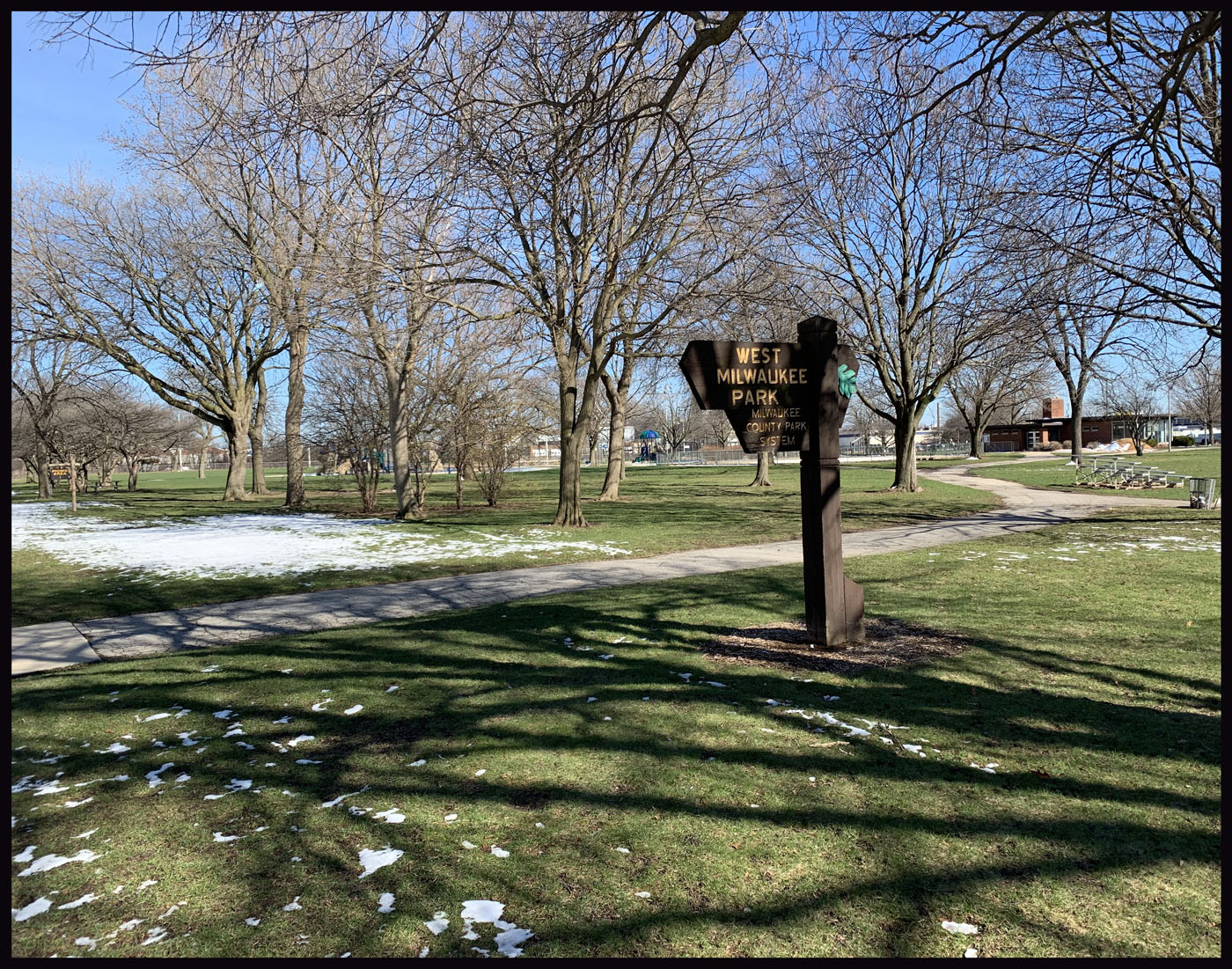
West Milwaukee Park

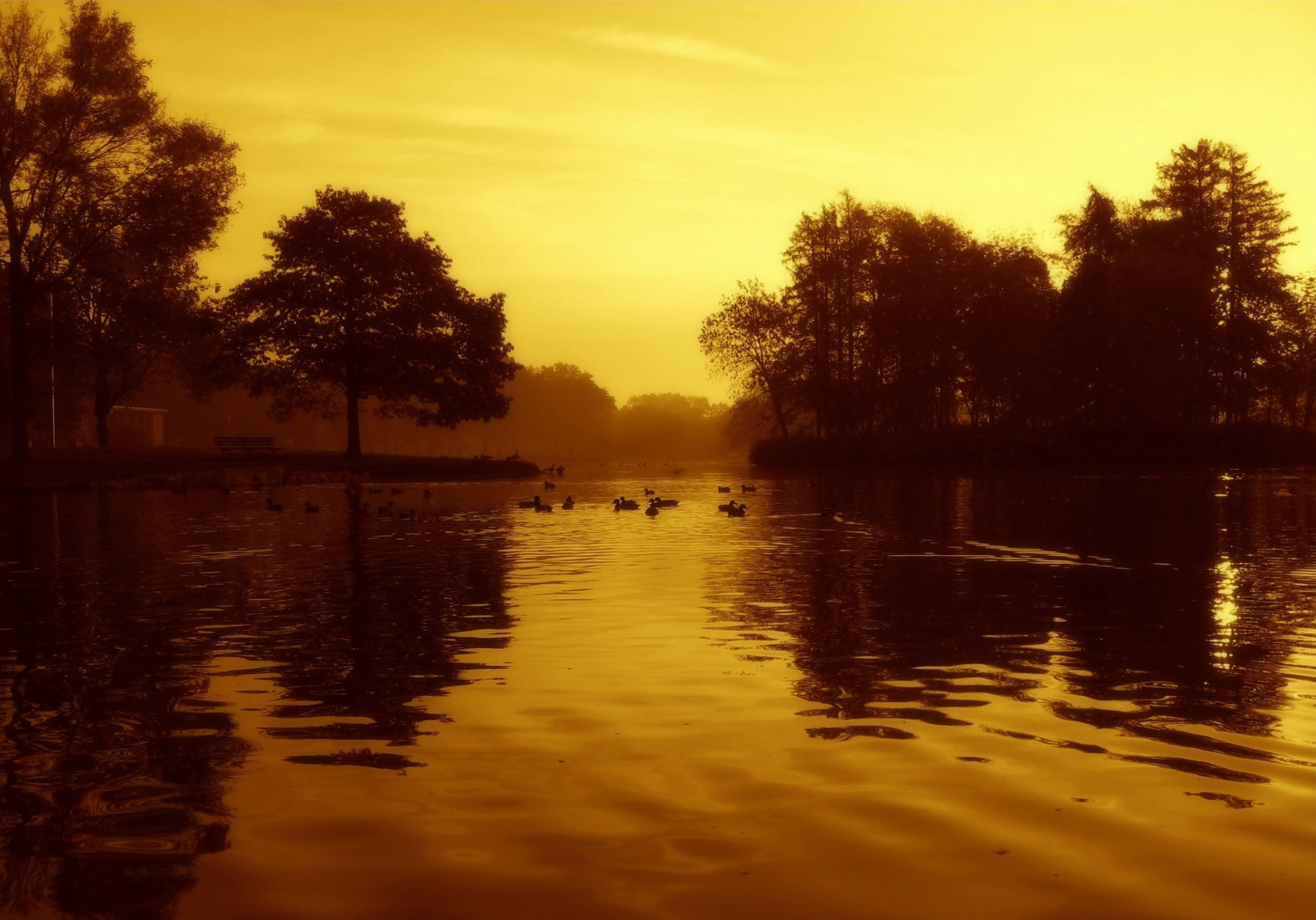
Jackson Park

== List of senators ==
Note: the boundaries of districts have changed over history. Previous politicians of a specific numbered district have represented a completely different geographic area, due to redistricting.

The district has previously been represented by:

Member	Party	Electoral history	Years	Leg. Term	District
District established March 13, 1848, by Art. XIV, Wis. Const.
Daniel G. Fenton (Prairie du Chien)	Democratic	Elected to the short term in May 1848.	June 5, 1848 – January 1, 1849	1st	Crawford, Chippewa, St. Croix, and La Pointe counties
James Fisher (Eastman)	Democratic	Elected in 1848.	January 1, 1849 – January 6, 1851	2nd 3rd	Crawford, Chippewa, St. Croix, and La Pointe counties
Hiram A. Wright (Prairie du Chien)	Democratic	Elected in 1850.	January 6, 1851 – January 3, 1853	4th 5th	Crawford, Chippewa, St. Croix, and La Pointe counties
Andrew M. Blair (Fond du Lac)	Democratic	Elected in 1852.	January 3, 1853 – January 1, 1855	6th 7th	1852–1855 1856–1860 1861–1865 1866–1870; Ozaukee County
Bolivar G. Gill (Grafton)	Democratic	Elected in 1854.	January 1, 1855 – January 5, 1857	8th 9th	1852–1855 1856–1860 1861–1865 1866–1870; Ozaukee County
Herman J. Schulteis (Ozaukee)	Democratic	Elected in 1856.	January 5, 1857 – January 3, 1859	10th 11th	1852–1855 1856–1860 1861–1865 1866–1870; Ozaukee County
Lion Silverman (Ozaukee)	Democratic	Elected in 1858. Resigned.	January 3, 1859 – October 1, 1859	12th	1852–1855 1856–1860 1861–1865 1866–1870; Ozaukee County
Vacant			October 1, 1859 – January 2, 1860	12th	1852–1855 1856–1860 1861–1865 1866–1870; Ozaukee County
Frederick Hilgen (Cedarburg)	Democratic	Won 1859 special election.	January 2, 1860 – January 7, 1861	13th	1852–1855 1856–1860 1861–1865 1866–1870; Ozaukee County
Hugh Cunning (Ozaukee)	Democratic	Elected in 1860.	January 7, 1861 – January 5, 1863	14th 15th	1852–1855 1856–1860 1861–1865 1866–1870; Ozaukee County
John R. Bohan (Ozaukee)	Democratic	Elected in 1862.	January 5, 1863 – January 2, 1865	16th 17th	1852–1855 1856–1860 1861–1865 1866–1870; Ozaukee County
Lyman Morgan (Ozaukee)	Democratic	January 2, 1865 – January 1, 1872	Elected in 1864, 1866, 1868, 1870. Redistricted to 33rd district.	18th 19th 20th 21st 22nd 23rd 24th	1852–1855 1856–1860 1861–1865 1866–1870; Ozaukee County
Francis Huebschmann (Milwaukee)	Democratic	Redistricted from 5th district.	January 1, 1872 – January 6, 1873	25th	Northern Milwaukee County: Town of Granville; Town of Milwaukee; Town of Wauwatosa; Wards 1, 2, 6, 9, city of Milwaukee
Frederick W. Cotzhausen (Milwaukee)	Democratic	Elected in 1872.	January 6, 1873 – January 4, 1875	26th 27th	Northern Milwaukee County: Town of Granville; Town of Milwaukee; Town of Wauwatosa; Wards 1, 2, 6, 9, city of Milwaukee
William H. Jacobs (Milwaukee)	Democratic	Elected in 1874.	January 4, 1875 – January 1, 1877	28th 29th	Northern Milwaukee County: Town of Granville; Town of Milwaukee; Town of Wauwatosa; Wards 1, 2, 6, 9, city of Milwaukee
Thomas A. Bones (Racine)	Republican	Elected in 1876.	January 1, 1877 – January 6, 1879	30th 31st	1876–1881 1882–1887 1888–1891; Racine County
William E. Chipman (Burlington)	Republican	Elected in 1878.	January 6, 1879 – January 3, 1881	32nd 33rd	1876–1881 1882–1887 1888–1891; Racine County
Albert L. Phillips (Racine)	Republican	Elected in 1880.	January 3, 1881 – January 1, 1883	34th 35th	1876–1881 1882–1887 1888–1891; Racine County
Charles Jonas (Racine)	Democratic	Elected in 1882.	January 1, 1883 – January 3, 1887	36th 37th	1876–1881 1882–1887 1888–1891; Racine County
Henry Allen Cooper (Racine)	Republican	Elected in 1886.	January 3, 1887 – January 5, 1891	38th 39th	1876–1881 1882–1887 1888–1891; Racine County
Adam Apple (Norway)	Democratic	Elected in 1890.	January 5, 1891 – January 7, 1895	40th	1876–1881 1882–1887 1888–1891; Racine County
Adam Apple (Norway)	Democratic	Elected in 1890.	January 5, 1891 – January 7, 1895	41st	1892–1895 1896–1901 1902–1911 1912–1921; Racine and Kenosha counties
Ernst G. Timme (Kenosha)	Republican	Elected in 1894.	January 7, 1895 – January 2, 1899	42nd 43rd	1892–1895 1896–1901 1902–1911 1912–1921; Racine and Kenosha counties
John F. Reynolds (Randall)	Republican	Elected in 1898.	January 2, 1899 – January 5, 1903	44th 45th	1892–1895 1896–1901 1902–1911 1912–1921; Racine and Kenosha counties
Otis Wells Johnson (Racine)	Republican	Elected in 1902.	January 5, 1903 – January 7, 1907	46th 47th	1892–1895 1896–1901 1902–1911 1912–1921; Racine and Kenosha counties
Isaac T. Bishop (Somers)	Republican	Elected in 1906, 1910.	January 7, 1907 – January 4, 1915	48th 49th 50th 51st	1892–1895 1896–1901 1902–1911 1912–1921; Racine and Kenosha counties
Charles H. Everett (Racine)	Republican	Elected in 1914.	January 4, 1915 – January 6, 1919	52nd 53rd	1892–1895 1896–1901 1902–1911 1912–1921; Racine and Kenosha counties
George L. Buck (Racine)	Republican	Elected in 1918.	January 6, 1919 – January 1, 1923	54th 55th	1892–1895 1896–1901 1902–1911 1912–1921; Racine and Kenosha counties
Walter Polakowski (Milwaukee)	Socialist	Elected in 1922, 1926, 1930.	January 1, 1923 – January 7, 1935	56th 57th 58th 59th 60th	Central Milwaukee County: Wards 8, 11, 14, 24, city of Milwaukee
Walter Polakowski (Milwaukee)	Socialist	Elected in 1922, 1926, 1930.	January 1, 1923 – January 7, 1935	61st	Central Milwaukee County: Wards 5, 8, 11, 24, city of Milwaukee
Arthur L. Zimny (Milwaukee)	Democratic	Elected in 1934, 1938.	January 7, 1935 – January 4, 1943	62nd 63rd 64th 65th	Central Milwaukee County: Wards 5, 8, 11, 24, city of Milwaukee
Clement J. Zablocki (Milwaukee)	Democratic	Elected in 1942, 1946. Elected to U.S. House.	January 4, 1943 – January 3, 1949	66th 67th 68th	Central Milwaukee County: Wards 5, 8, 11, 24, city of Milwaukee
Vacant			January 3, 1949 – April 19, 1949	69th	Central Milwaukee County: Wards 5, 8, 11, 24, city of Milwaukee
Casimir Kendziorski (Milwaukee)	Democratic	Won 1949 special election. Re-elected 1950, 1954, 1958, 1962, 1966, 1970. Died in office.	April 19, 1949 – September 26, 1974	69th	Central Milwaukee County: Wards 5, 8, 11, 24, city of Milwaukee
Casimir Kendziorski (Milwaukee)	Democratic	Won 1949 special election. Re-elected 1950, 1954, 1958, 1962, 1966, 1970. Died in office.	April 19, 1949 – September 26, 1974	70th 71st	Central Milwaukee County: Wards 5, 8, 11, 24, city of Milwaukee
Casimir Kendziorski (Milwaukee)	Democratic	Won 1949 special election. Re-elected 1950, 1954, 1958, 1962, 1966, 1970. Died in office.	April 19, 1949 – September 26, 1974	72nd 73rd 74th 75th 76th	Central Milwaukee County: Wards 11, 12, 14, city of Milwaukee
Casimir Kendziorski (Milwaukee)	Democratic	Won 1949 special election. Re-elected 1950, 1954, 1958, 1962, 1966, 1970. Died in office.	April 19, 1949 – September 26, 1974	77th 78th 79th 80th	Central Milwaukee County: Milwaukee Assembly districts 11, 12, 14
Casimir Kendziorski (Milwaukee)	Democratic	Won 1949 special election. Re-elected 1950, 1954, 1958, 1962, 1966, 1970. Died in office.	April 19, 1949 – September 26, 1974	81st	Central Milwaukee County: State Assembly Districts 7, 8, 9
Jerry Kleczka (Milwaukee)	Democratic	Elected in 1974, 1978.	January 6, 1975 – January 3, 1983	82nd 83rd 84th 85th	Central Milwaukee County: State Assembly Districts 7, 8, 9
John Norquist (Milwaukee)	Democratic	Elected in 1982, 1986. Resigned to become Mayor of Milwaukee.	January 3, 1983 – April 15, 1988	86th 87th	Central Milwaukee County: Wards 66, 69-79, 132, 137, 138, 140, 143-156, 158, 221-233, 235-239, 262, 304-308, and 311-324, city of Milwaukee; Wards 16, 17, city of West Allis
John Norquist (Milwaukee)	Democratic	Elected in 1982, 1986. Resigned to become Mayor of Milwaukee.	January 3, 1983 – April 15, 1988	88th	Central Milwaukee County: Wards 66, 69-79, 132, 137, 138, 140, 143-156, 158, 221-233, 235-239, 262, 304-308, and 311-324, city of Milwaukee; Wards 16, 17, city of West Allis
Vacant			April 15, 1988 – November 15, 1988	88th	Central Milwaukee County: Wards 66, 69-79, 132, 137, 138, 140, 143-156, 158, 221-233, 235-239, 262, 304-308, and 311-324, city of Milwaukee; Wards 16, 17, city of West Allis
Brian B. Burke (Milwaukee)	Democratic	Won 1988 special election. Re-elected 1990, 1994, 1998.	November 15, 1988 – January 6, 2003	88th	Central Milwaukee County: Wards 66, 69-79, 132, 137, 138, 140, 143-156, 158, 221-233, 235-239, 262, 304-308, and 311-324, city of Milwaukee; Wards 16, 17, city of West Allis
Brian B. Burke (Milwaukee)	Democratic	Won 1988 special election. Re-elected 1990, 1994, 1998.	November 15, 1988 – January 6, 2003	89th 90th	Central Milwaukee County: Wards 66, 69-79, 132, 137, 138, 140, 143-156, 158, 221-233, 235-239, 262, 304-308, and 311-324, city of Milwaukee; Wards 16, 17, city of West Allis
Brian B. Burke (Milwaukee)	Democratic	Won 1988 special election. Re-elected 1990, 1994, 1998.	November 15, 1988 – January 6, 2003	91st 92nd 93rd 94th 95th	1992–2001 2002–2011 2012–2021 Central Milwaukee County: State Assembly Districts 7, 8, 9
Tim Carpenter (Milwaukee)	Democratic	Elected in 2002, 2006, 2010, 2014, 2018, 2022, 2026.	January 6, 2003 – present	96th 97th 98th 99th 100th 101st 102nd 103rd 104th 105th	1992–2001 2002–2011 2012–2021 Central Milwaukee County: State Assembly Districts 7, 8, 9
Tim Carpenter (Milwaukee)	Democratic	Elected in 2002, 2006, 2010, 2014, 2018, 2022, 2026.	January 6, 2003 – present	106th	Central Milwaukee County
Tim Carpenter (Milwaukee)	Democratic	Elected in 2002, 2006, 2010, 2014, 2018, 2022, 2026.	January 6, 2003 – present	107th 108th	

== See also ==
- Political subdivisions of Wisconsin
