= Frederick Hilgen =

19th century American politician

Member of the Wisconsin Senate from the 3rd district
- In office January 2, 1860 – January 7, 1861
- Preceded by: Lion Silverman
- Succeeded by: Hugh Cunning

Personal details
- Born: Johann Friedrich Hilgen; April 3, 1805 Kirchhatten, Duchy of Oldenburg
- Died: March 27, 1878 (aged 72)
- Resting place: Hilgen Cemetery, Cedarburg, Wisconsin
- Party: Democratic
- Spouse: Katherine Louise Boerner (m. 1837–1878)
- Children: Friedrich Hilgen^{(b. 1838; died 1839)}; Margaretha Hilgen^{(b. 1839; died 1888)}; Louise Hilgen^{(b. 1841; died 1842)}; Christian Hilgen^{(b. 1843; died 1843)}; Eliza F. (Johann)^{(b. 1844; died 1912)}; John F. Hilgen^{(b. 1846; died 1887)}; Anna Katherina Dorothea (Wittenberg)^{(b. 1847; died 1936)}; Helena Wilhelmina (Bach)^{(b. 1849; died 1934)}; Johanna Emilie (Barth)^{(b. 1851; died 1923)}; Bertha Louise Hilgen^{(b. 1854; died 1875)}; James H. Hilgen^{(b. 1857; died 1923)}; 2 others
- Occupation: Miller

Military service
- Allegiance: United States
- Branch/service: South Carolina Militia; Wisconsin Militia
- Unit: German Fusilier Society (SC); Wisconsin Guards (WI)
- Battles/wars: Second Seminole War

Johann Friedrich "Frederick" Hilgen (April 3, 1805 – March 27, 1878) was a German American immigrant, miller, and Wisconsin pioneer. He is known as the "father" of Cedarburg, Wisconsin, and was responsible for the construction of the historic Cedarburg Mill and the Hilgen and Wittenberg Woolen Mill. He also represented Ozaukee County in the Wisconsin Senate during the 1860 legislative session.

== Early life ==
Frederick Hilgen was born Johann Friedrich Hilgen in the municipality of Kirchhatten, in what is now northwestern Germany. At the time of his birth, this area was the Duchy of Oldenburg. He was raised and educated in Germany, learning to farm from his father. He emigrated to the United States in 1832, settling in a German immigrant community in Charleston, South Carolina, where he remained for over a decade. In South Carolina, he opened a grocery and general store. He operated the store in partnership with William Schroeder, another immigrant from Kirchhatten, who would be Hilgen's business partner for most of his life. (Note: Schroeder and Hilgen were apparently connected since at least young adulthood. "Schroeder" is also the maiden name of Hilgen's mother, so the two may have been cousins.)

While living in South Carolina, Hilgen was also a member of the volunteer militia company the "German Fusilier Society". As part of his involvement with the militia, he served with the United States forces in the Second Seminole War and participated in a campaign in the Everglades.

Hilgen and several of his partners and friends began looking for a new home in the early 1840s, and became aware of the nascent German immigrant community thriving in the village of Milwaukee in the Wisconsin Territory. In 1843, Hilgen and his compatriots sold their business interests in Charleston and moved to Milwaukee, buying a store together on Water Street in the downtown area. Later that year, Hilgen made his first visit to the area of Cedarburg, on the road between Milwaukee and Green Bay, Wisconsin, and quickly decided that he would relocate there.

== Father of Cedarburg ==
Hilgen purchased his original lot of 160 acres in April 1844. He eventually owned as much as 400 acres, but sold off pieces for real estate speculation. Shortly after his purchase, he and Schroeder began construction of a saw and gristmill on land that they believed would be suitable for the center of a village, the mill was completed in 1845. They also cut a road from their mill to the Green Bay Road to facilitate trade.

Around this time, Hilgen came into conflict with another early settler in the Cedarburg area—Dr. Fred Luening. Luening, who operated a separate mill in Cedarburg, constructed a dam on his property which flooded five acres of Hilgen's land. After more than a year of attempting to convince Luening to destroy or modify the dam, Hilgen sued in 1847. Since public opinion in Cedarburg was significantly in favor of Hilgen, Luening got the case moved to Dodge County, but still ultimately lost the case and was forced to destroy the dam and pay monetary damages. Luening sold his interests in Cedarburg and left shortly thereafter. Just after Wisconsin achieved statehood, Hilgen along with several other prominent settlers lobbied to have the town of Cedarburg established from the western half of the town of Grafton.

Hilgen also became involved with the militia in Wisconsin, joining the "Wisconsin Guards"—a Milwaukee-based militia company made of mostly German immigrants. Throughout the latter half of the 1840s, Hilgen was also actively engaged in a mission to recruit other similarly motivated German Lutherans to come settle in his village. His most prominent recruit during these years was Frederick W. Horn, who went on to serve 14 years in the Wisconsin State Assembly and five years in the State Senate, and was three times elected speaker of the Wisconsin State Assembly. Horn also became the first mayor of Cedarburg when it was incorporated as a city in 1885.

After a decade of growth and commerce in Cedarburg, by the mid-1850s Hilgen and his associates decided they needed a more extensive and durable mill facility. They contracted Burchard Weber to design a new mill, made of stone rather than wood. The new five-story mill was completed in 1855, and could produce 120 barrels of flour per day. This was the building now known as the Cedarburg Mill.

Hilgen only served in state office once. He was elected in an 1859 special election to serve one year in the Wisconsin Senate following the resignation of the incumbent, Lion Silverman. He received the Democratic nomination and faced no opposition in the general election. During the 1860 legislative session, he served on the committees on internal improvements and on state prisons. He did not run for re-election in 1860.

Through the next several decades, Hilgen was responsible for several other important buildings and institutions in the new village, including the Hilgen and Wittenberg Woolen Mill, which is also not listed in the National Register of Historic Places. He also established the Hilgen Spring Park, a popular summer resort, in 1852, and founded the Hilgen Manufacturing Company in partnership with his son in 1872.

He was also one of the co-founders of the Ozaukee County Agricultural Society and the Bank of Cedarburg, which was organized in 1968. He served as an officer in both organizations.

Hilgen died in March 1878.

== Personal life and family ==
Hilgen was one of seven children born to Christian Carl Ludwig Hilgen and his wife Anna Sophia (née Schroeder) Hilgen. (Note: His father's name was originally "Hilling" but was legally changed to "Hilgen" in 1790.) His father was an Untervogt in Oldenburg—a secular government administrator, generally of junior nobility. His father died in 1821, when Frederick Hilgen was 16.

After emigrating to the United States, Hilgen returned to Oldenburg in 1837 to marry Katherine Louise Boerner, the sister of his business partner C. Frederick Boerner. The decision to leave Charleston was in part motivated by the fact that Hilgen and his wife lost four of their first five children—Hilgen blamed South Carolina's heat and humidity. They ultimately would have nine more children after moving to Wisconsin, all nine survived to adulthood.

== Notes ==
Wisconsin Senate
Preceded by Lion Silverman	Member of the Wisconsin Senate from the 3rd district January 2, 1860 – January 7, 1861	Succeeded by Hugh Cunning
