= Stannard Schoolhouse =

- U.S. National Register of Historic Places
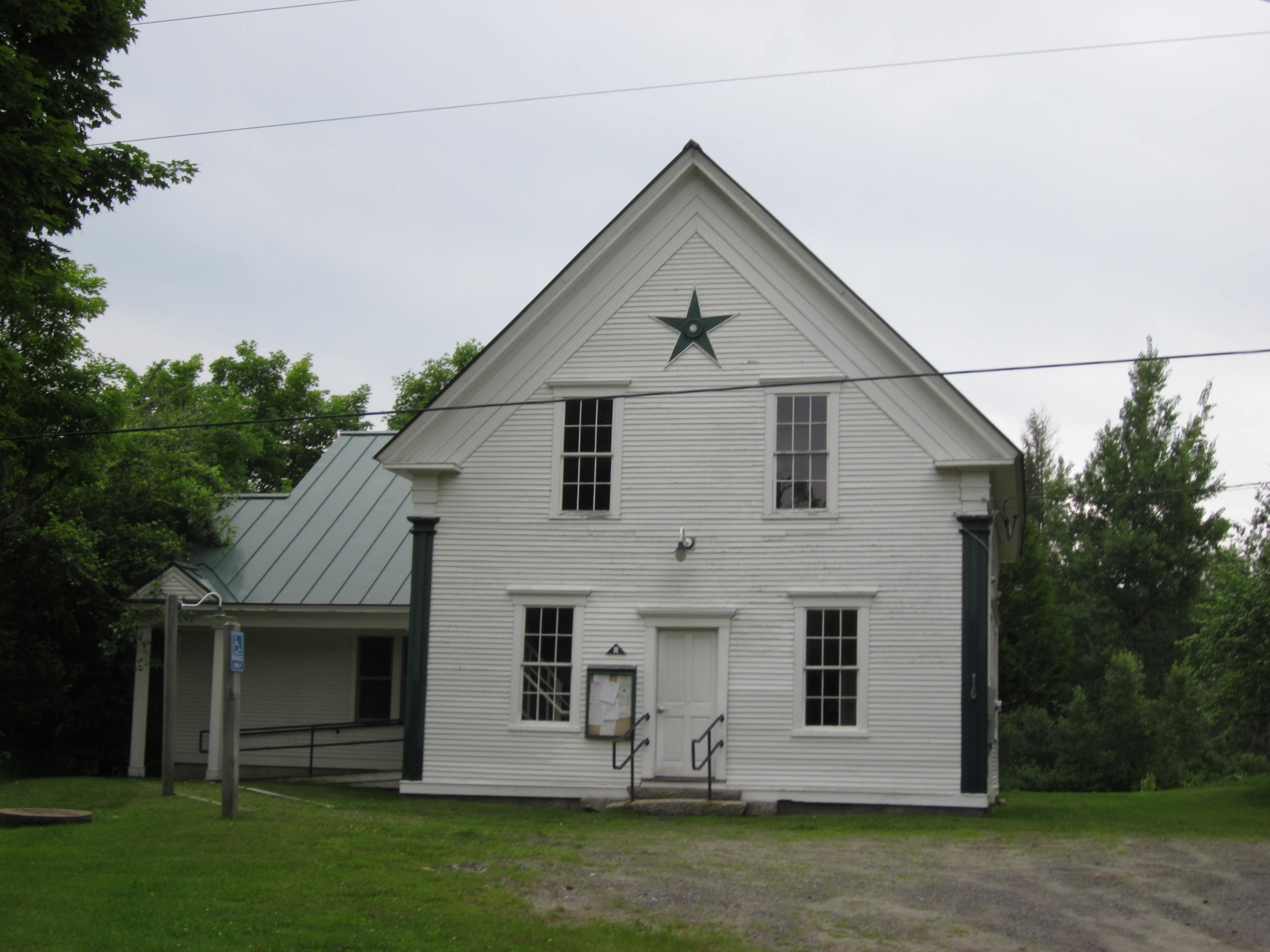

- Location within Vermont Location within the United States
- Location: Stannard Mountain Rd., Stannard, Vermont
- Coordinates: 44°32′34″N 72°12′52″W
- Area: 0.5 acres (0.20 ha)
- Architectural style: Greek Revival, Vernacular Greek Revival
- NRHP reference No.: 77000097
- Added to NRHP: December 12, 1977

Stannard Town Hall is the center of municipal government of the small rural community of Stannard, Vermont. It is on Stannard Mountain Road, in what was formerly the Stannard Schoolhouse, one of the only municipal buildings in the town. Of uncertain (but likely pre-1850) construction, it served as a school until 1964. It was listed on the National Register of Historic Places in 1977.

== Description and history ==
The town center of Stannard, a small rural community of northern Vermont, is little more than a crossroads at Stannard Mountain Road and Lazy Mill Road, with dispersed residences. The town hall, one of two public buildings in the town center (along with the Methodist Episcopal Church), is located east of the junction, on the north side of Stannard Mountain Road. It is a two-story wood-frame structure, with a front-facing gable roof, clapboarded exterior, and granite foundation. The main facade is three bays wide, with sash windows flanking a center entrance, and two symmetrically placed sash windows on the second level. The windows are topped by projecting lintels. The east facade has a bank of sash windows in its rear half, an early 20th century alteration to meet state school standards.

The first school was organized in Stannard in 1812, but met in private residences or barns with only small numbers of students. Its first school building was constructed in 1823. The present building is not documented until it appears on an 1875 map; its styling is vernacular Greek Revival, which is typical of mid-19th century school buildings in rural Vermont. It also exhibits features consistent with construction after state standards for schools were first introduced in 1846. The building served as a school until 1964, and has housed the town offices since.

== See also ==
- National Register of Historic Places listings in Caledonia County, Vermont
