= Methodist Episcopal Church (Stannard, Vermont) =

Historic church in Vermont, United States

- Methodist-Episcopal Church
- U.S. National Register of Historic Places
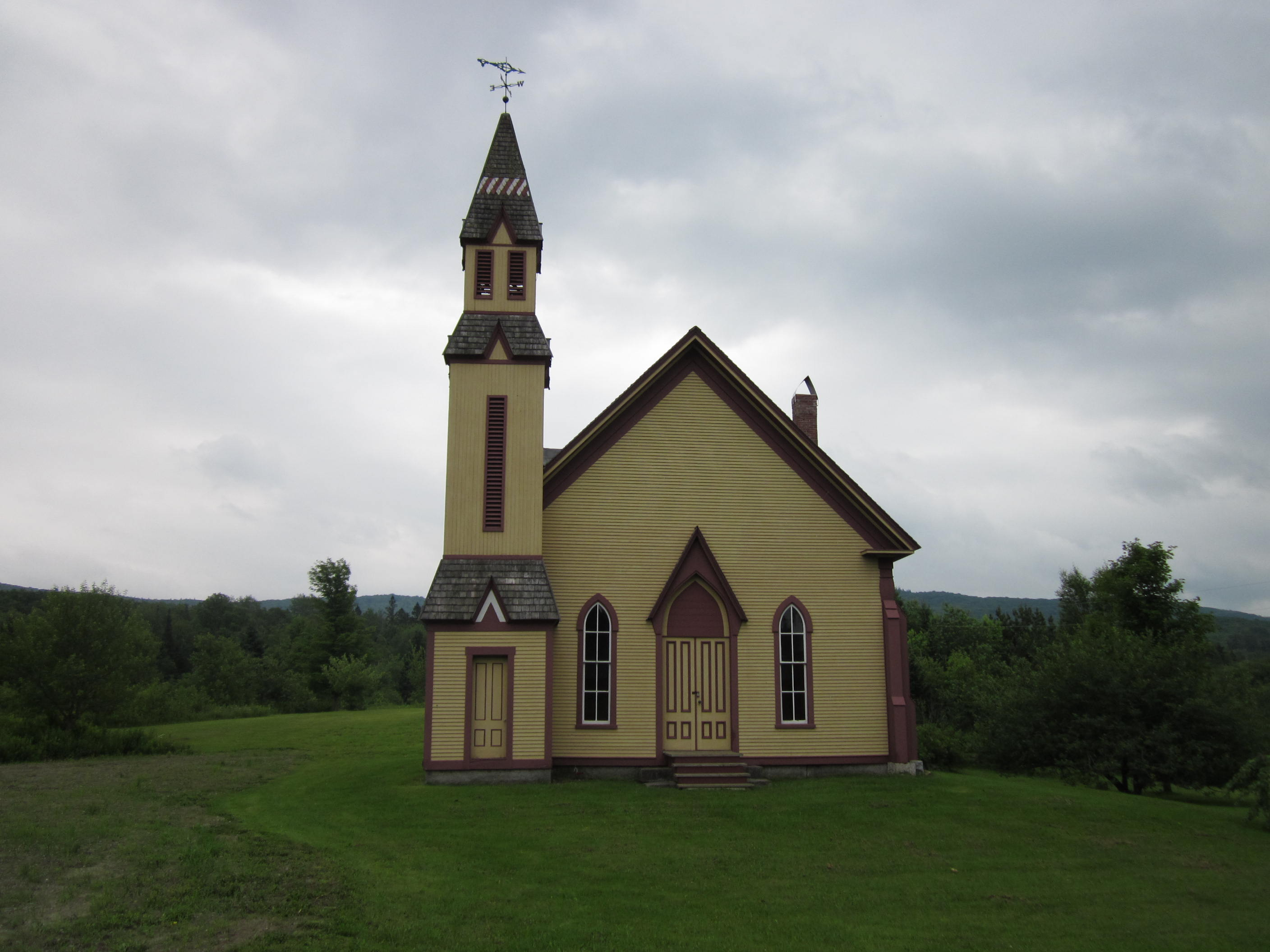

- Location within Vermont Location within the United States
- Location: Stannard Mountain Rd., Stannard, Vermont
- Coordinates: 44°32′33″N 72°12′48″W
- Area: 0.5 acres (0.20 ha)
- Built: 1888
- Architectural style: Victorian vernacular
- NRHP reference No.: 78000229
- Added to NRHP: January 5, 1978

The Methodist-Episcopal Church, also known as the Stannard-Greensboro Bend Methodist Church, is a historic church in Stannard, Vermont. Built in 1888, it is one of the small town's few 19th-century public buildings, and a good example vernacular Victorian architecture. It was listed on the National Register of Historic Places in 1978.

== Description and history ==
The town center of Stannard, a small rural community of northern Vermont, is little more than a crossroads at Stannard Mountain Road and Lazy Mill Road, with dispersed residences. The church, one of two municipal buildings in the town center, is located east of the junction, on the south side of Stannard Mountain Road. It is a 1 1/2-story wood-frame structure, with a gabled roof, clapboarded exterior, and granite foundation. A square tower rises from the left front corner, with three stages separated by shingled skirts which have steeply pitched small walled gables. The ground stage has a secondary entrance, the second stage has a narrow louvered opening, and the third stage houses the belfry, with paired louvered openings. The tower is capped by a pyramidal roof with bands of multicolored slate shingles. The main facade is three bays wide, with a center entrance flanked by windows, each set in Gothic-arched openings. The interior of the church is virtually unaltered since its construction.

The church was built in 1888, and is, along with the nearby Stannard Schoolhouse (now the town hall), one of its only public buildings. It was built on land donated by a citizen, on condition that it be used at least once per year for religious services. This annual event is now part of an "old home day" celebration.

== See also ==
- National Register of Historic Places listings in Caledonia County, Vermont
