= Stannard, Vermont =

- Town
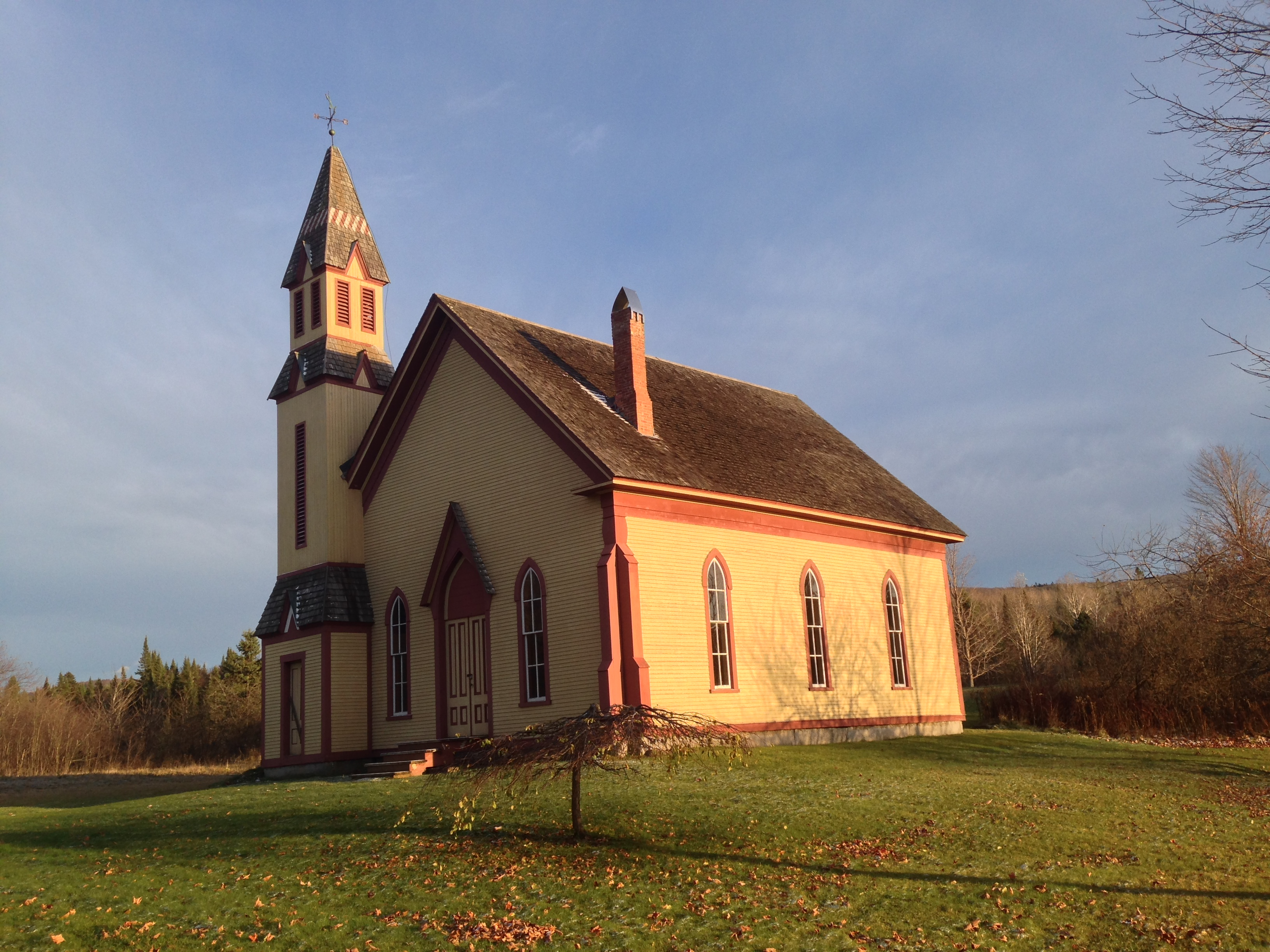
- Methodist Church in Stannard

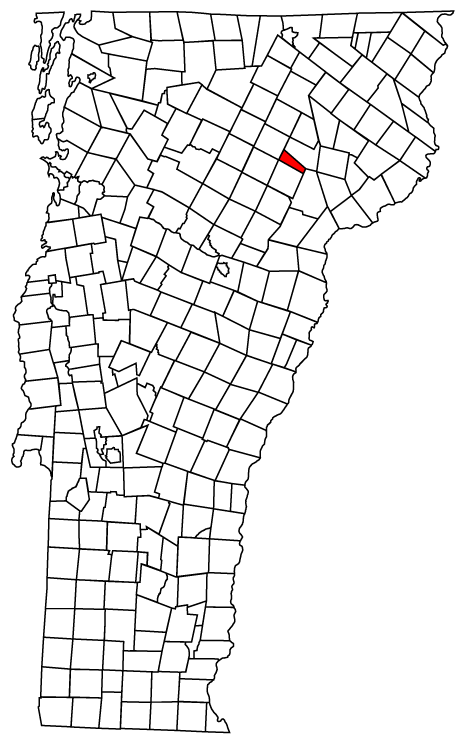
- Stannard, Vermont
- Coordinates: 44°32′30″N 72°13′45″W
- Country: United States
- State: Vermont
- County: Caledonia

Area
  - Total: 12.5 sq mi (32.4 km^{2})
  - Land: 12.4 sq mi (32.2 km^{2})
  - Water: 0.077 sq mi (0.2 km^{2})
- Elevation: 1,767 ft (539 m)

Population (2020)
  - Total: 208
  - Density: 17/sq mi (6.5/km^{2})
- Time zone: UTC-5 (Eastern (EST))
  - Summer (DST): UTC-4 (EDT)
- ZIP Codes: 05842 (Greensboro Bend); 05836 (East Hardwick)
- Area code: 802
- FIPS code: 50-69925
- GNIS feature ID: 1462216

Stannard is a town in Caledonia County, Vermont. The population was 208 at the 2020 census. The town has no paved roads.

== History ==
Previously known as Goshen Gore No. 1, the town was incorporated as Stannard in honor of General George J. Stannard, a Union Army hero of the Civil War. Stannard and his 2nd Vermont Brigade broke Pickett's Charge and beat back troops from Florida and Alabama. He was commended by the Vermont legislature in 1865 for his "skill and bravery".

At the center of town are the old Methodist Church and the Stannard Schoolhouse, a former school that now serves as the town government building.

== Geography ==
According to the United States Census Bureau, the town has a total area of 12.5 square miles (32.4 km^{2}), of which 12.4 square miles (32.2 km^{2}) is land and 0.077 square miles (0.2 km^{2}), or 0.69%, is water.

The highest point in town is the summit of Stannard Mountain, which rises above 2,618 feet (798 m) above sea level. Most of the town slopes to the west, draining to the Lamoille River, a tributary of Lake Champlain. The eastern end of town drains to the Connecticut River.

== Demographics ==
Historical population
Census	Pop.	Note	%±
1850	215		—
1860	240		11.6%
1870	228		−5.0%
1880	252		10.5%
1890	239		−5.2%
1900	222		−7.1%
1910	206		−7.2%
1920	173		−16.0%
1930	154		−11.0%
1940	140		−9.1%
1950	116		−17.1%
1960	113		−2.6%
1970	88		−22.1%
1980	142		61.4%
1990	148		4.2%
2000	185		25.0%
2010	216		16.8%
2020	208		−3.7%
U.S. Decennial Census

As of the census of 2000, there were 185 people, 73 households, and 54 families residing in the town. The population density was 14.8 people per square mile (5.7/km^{2}). There were 106 housing units at an average density of 8.5 per square mile (3.3/km^{2}). The racial makeup of the town was 98.92% White, 0.54% African American, 0.54% from other races. Hispanic or Latino of any race were 0.54% of the population.

There were 73 households, out of which 37.0% had children under the age of 18 living with them, 57.5% were married couples living together, 9.6% had a female householder with no husband present, and 24.7% were non-families. 20.5% of all households were made up of individuals, and 4.1% had someone living alone who was 65 years of age or older. The average household size was 2.53 and the average family size was 2.82.

In the town, the population was spread out, with 28.1% under the age of 18, 2.2% from 18 to 24, 31.9% from 25 to 44, 27.0% from 45 to 64, and 10.8% who were 65 years of age or older. The median age was 38 years. For every 100 females, there were 110.2 males. For every 100 females age 18 and over, there were 107.8 males.

The median income for a household in the town was $36,250, and the median income for a family was $35,625. Males had a median income of $31,250 versus $22,750 for females. The per capita income for the town was $15,196. About 13.2% of families and 18.8% of the population were below the poverty line, including 13.3% of those under the age of eighteen and 41.2% of those 65 or over.

== Notable people ==
- Andrew M. Blair, member of the Wisconsin Senate, born and raised in Stannard
- Charles Clark Jamieson, U.S. Army brigadier general, raised in Stannard
- Bernie Sanders, U.S. Senator, lived in Stannard from the late 1960s to the early 1970s
