= H. H. Winter =

American politician

Hermann Heinrich Winter (May 12, 1805 – December 28, 1884) was an American farmer from Watertown, Wisconsin who spent one term as a "Democratic Republican" member of the Wisconsin State Assembly from Jefferson County.

== Background ==
Winter was born May 12, 1805, in the Free Imperial City of Bremen. Winter held a number of offices in the early years of the Town of Watertown, including town clerk 1853–54, school superintendent 1854, justice of the peace 1855, supervisor (town council member) 1857, sealer 1859, and chairman of the town board 1860–61. As of 1860, Winter described himself as a native of Bremen, a farmer aged 55 who had been in Wisconsin for 16 years.

== Legislative service ==
Winter was elected in 1859 for the 4th Jefferson County Assembly district (the Towns of Ashippun, Lebanon, Ixonia and Watertown), succeeding Democrat Ferdinand Wagner. (He was the only member of either house to designate himself a "Democratic Republican".) He was appointed to the standing committee on charitable and religious institutions. He was succeeded by Democrat Samuel Hays.

== After the legislature ==
He died December 28, 1884, and is buried in the Ebenezer Moravian Cemetery in Watertown.
