= John R. Bohan =

Politician from County Tipperary

Member of the Wisconsin Senate from the 3rd district
- In office January 1, 1863 – January 1, 1865
- Preceded by: Hugh Cunning
- Succeeded by: Lyman Morgan

Member of the Wisconsin State Assembly from the Ozaukee 1st district
- In office January 1, 1872 – January 1, 1873
- Preceded by: Charles G. Meyer
- Succeeded by: Charles E. Chamberlain
- In office January 1, 1859 – January 1, 1860
- Preceded by: Alexander M. Alling
- Succeeded by: Anthony Ahlhauser

Personal details
- Born: John Russel Bohan; December 7, 1824 Templemore, Ireland, UK
- Died: November 14, 1886 (aged 61) Ozaukee County, Wisconsin
- Resting place: Old Saint Marys Cemetery; Port Washington, Wisconsin
- Party: Democratic
- Spouses: Mary Sullivan; (m. 1852; died 1926)
- Children: Michael G. Bohan^{(b. 1852; died 1911)}; Ella Bohan^{(b. c.1856)}; Emma Bohan^{(b. c.1859)}; Frank Bohan^{(b. 1862; died 1900)}; Mary G. (Packman)^{(b. 1864; died 1930)}; John Bohan^{(b. 1867; died 1926)}; George Stanley Bohan^{(b. 1871)}; Maude Bohan^{(b. 1874)}
- Parents: Michael Bohan (father); Anastasia Russell (mother)

John Russel Bohan (December 7, 1824 – November 14, 1886) was an Irish American immigrant, newspaper publisher, and politician. He was a member of the Wisconsin State Assembly and the Wisconsin State Senate, and served several local and county offices in Ozaukee County, Wisconsin.

== Biography ==
Bohan was born on December 7, 1824, near Templemore, Ireland, and immigrated to the United States with his family. He moved to Hartford, Wisconsin in 1846. In 1852, he married Mary Katharina Sullivan. They had nine children. He was the editor of the Ozaukee County Advertiser. Bohan died in 1886 after being struck by a train.

== Career ==
Bohan was a member of the Assembly in 1859 and was later returned to office in 1872. He was a member of the Wisconsin Senate for one term, covering 1863 and 1864. Additionally, he was Chairman of Port Washington, Wisconsin, and of the Ozaukee County Democratic Committee, as well as a justice of the peace.
