= Samuel Northrup =

American politician (1801–1860)

Samuel Northrup (January 8, 1801 – May 22, 1860) was a member of the Wisconsin State Assembly. He was a resident of Dellona, Wisconsin. Northrup is buried in North Freedom, Wisconsin.

== Career ==
Nothrup was a member of the Assembly in 1858. He was a Republican.
