= James Fisher (Wisconsin politician) =

American politician (1816–1901)

James Fisher (5 February 1816, Crawford County, Pennsylvania – 1 January 1901, Crawford County, Wisconsin) was a member of the Wisconsin State Senate and the Wisconsin State Assembly. Fisher represented the 3rd District of the Senate during the 1849 and 1850 sessions. Later, he was a member of the Assembly during the 1855, 1863 and 1868 sessions. He was a Democrat.
