= Bolivar G. Gill =

American politician (1821–1907)

Member of the Chicago City Council from the 14th ward
- In office December 6, 1869 – December 2, 1872 Serving with Patrick B. Sheil; S.E. Cleveland
- Preceded by: Lewis A. Berger
- Succeeded by: Bart Quirk

Member of the Wisconsin Senate from the 3rd district
- In office January 1, 1855 – January 5, 1857
- Preceded by: Andrew M. Blair
- Succeeded by: Herman J. Schulteis

Personal details
- Born: August 1821 New York, U.S.
- Died: March 8, 1907 (aged 85) River Forest, Illinois, U.S.
- Resting place: Graceland Cemetery, Chicago, Illinois
- Party: Republican; Democratic (1855–1860); Whig (before 1854)
- Spouse: Sera L. Lamberson (died 1882)
- Children: Eva Viola (Noyes); (adopted 1856; died 1926)

Bolivar G. Gill (August 1821 – March 8, 1907) was an American lumber merchant and Democratic politician. He represented Ozaukee County in the Wisconsin State Senate in the 8th and 9th legislatures (1855 & 1856). He later served on the Chicago City Council. In historical documents his name is frequently abbreviated as B. G. Gill.

== Biography ==
Bolivar G. Gill was born in New York. He moved to Wisconsin Territory sometime before 1848 and became involved with the Whig Party in Dodge County. He subsequently moved to Grafton, Wisconsin, where he became involved with railroad development.

While living in Ozaukee County, in 1854, he ran for Wisconsin State Senate as a Democrat, and was elected to the 8th Wisconsin Legislature. After his term in the Legislature, Gill was one of dozens of lawmakers accused of accepting bribes from railroad companies and asked to stand down from any future electoral office.

In 1858, before the report of the bribery investigation was published, Gill moved to Chicago. He became a prominent lumber merchant and changed his political affiliation again, becoming a member of the Republican Party. In 1869 he was elected to the Chicago City Council, where he found himself on the other side of a corruption investigation.

He remained active in Republican Party politics but did not hold office again. He was a presidential elector for Illinois in the 1876 United States presidential election.

His business in the lumber industry continued until 1885, when he retired.

== Personal life and family ==
Bolivar Gill and his wife Sera had no biological children, but adopted Eva Viola Keene after the death of her father. Bolivar Gill died at his residence in River Forest, Illinois, on March 8, 1907.

Wisconsin Senate
Preceded by Andrew M. Blair	Member of the Wisconsin Senate from the 3rd district January 1, 1855 – January 5, 1857	Succeeded by Herman J. Schulteis
