= Silas Matteson =

American politician

Silas C. Matteson (August 10, 1819 – April 19, 1895) was an American politician.

Born in Rome, New York, he came to Wisconsin Territory in 1837 and then moved to Illinois. In 1845, he moved to Kenosha, Wisconsin and then to New Cassell, Wisconsin, where he was the first postmaster. In the early 1850s he prospected for gold in California. In 1859, he served in the Wisconsin State Assembly. He died in Kenosha, Wisconsin.
