= Philemon Simpson =

American politician

- Born: October 13, 1819; Ashtabula County, Ohio
- Died: April 28, 1895 (aged 75); Mobile, Alabama

Philemon B. Simpson (October 13, 1819 – April 28, 1895) was an American lawyer and politician.

== Early life ==
Simpson was born in Ashtabula County, Ohio, and was raised in Jefferson County, New York. He graduated from the University of Cincinnati College of Law in 1843 and was admitted to the Ohio Bar.

== Career ==
Simposon practiced law in Peru, Indiana. In 1847, he moved to Shullburg, Wisconsin Territory and practiced law. He served in various city, village, and town government offices. In 1853, Simpson served in the Wisconsin State Assembly, as a Democrat, and then from 1857 to 1860, he then served in the Wisconsin State Senate.

== Personal life ==
He died in Mobile, Alabama while his wife was recuperating from illness.
