= Wisconsin's 4th Senate district =

American legislative district for Milwaukee, Wisconsin

Wisconsin's 4th State Senate district
- 2024 map defined in 2023 Wisc. Act 94; 2022 map defined in Johnson v. Wisconsin Elections Commission; 2011 map was defined in 2011 Wisc. Act 43 composed of Assembly districts 10, 11, and 12
Senator
Dora Drake; D–Milwaukee
since January 6, 2025 (1 year, 52 days)
- Demographics: 29.71% White; 58.76% Black; 4.93% Hispanic; 6.28% Asian; 1.44% Native American; 0.13% Hawaiian/Pacific Islander
- Population (2020) • Voting age: 178,419; 128,996
- Website: Official website
- Notes: Northern Milwaukee

The 4th Senate district of Wisconsin is one of 33 districts in the Wisconsin Senate. Located in southeast Wisconsin, the district is entirely contained within northern Milwaukee County. It comprises part of the north side of the city of Milwaukee, as well as the city of Glendale, the village of Shorewood, and parts of northern Wauwatosa and western Brown Deer. The 4th Senate district is one of two majority-black Senate districts in Wisconsin.

== Current elected officials ==
Dora Drake is the senator representing the 4th district. She was first elected in a 2024 special election and was subsequently elected to a full four-year term in the 2024 general election. She previously served four years in the Wisconsin State Assembly, representing the 11th district.

Each Wisconsin State Senate district is composed of three State Assembly districts. The 4th Senate district comprises the 10th, 11th, and 12th Assembly districts. The current representatives of those districts are:

- Assembly District 10: Darrin Madison (D–Milwaukee)
- Assembly District 11: Sequanna Taylor (D–Milwaukee)
- Assembly District 12: Russell Goodwin (D–Milwaukee)

The district is located within Wisconsin's 4th congressional district, which is represented by U.S. Representative Gwen Moore.

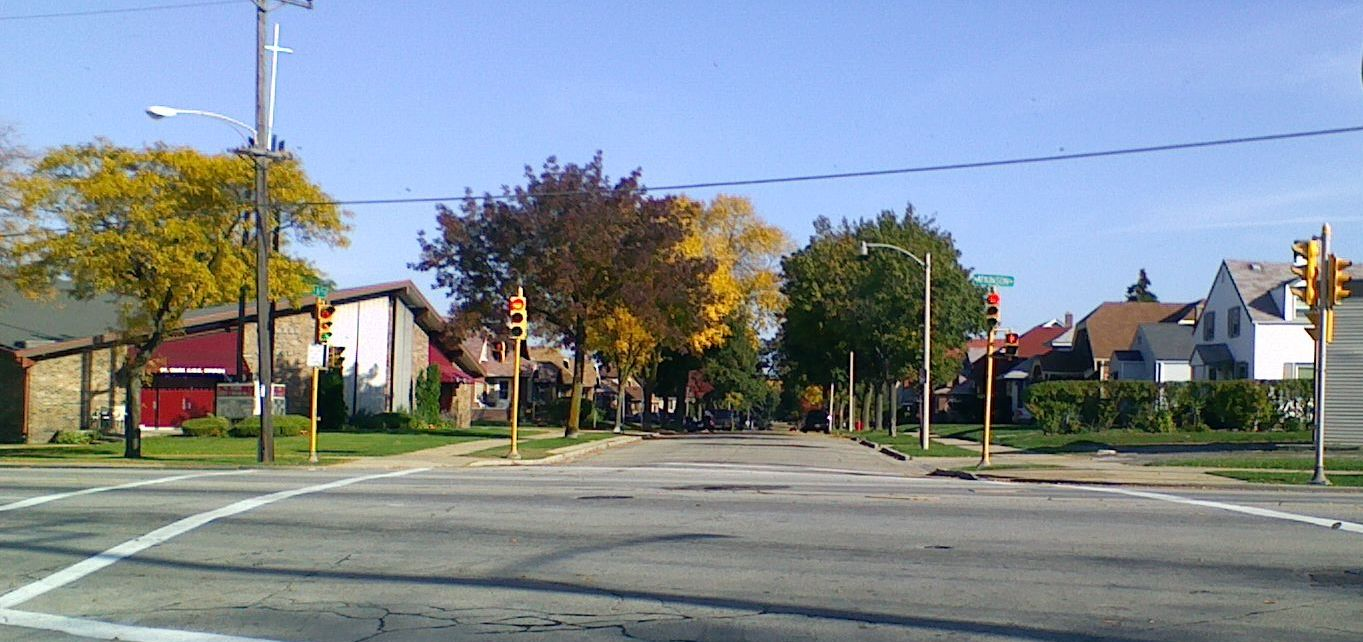
Arlington Heights

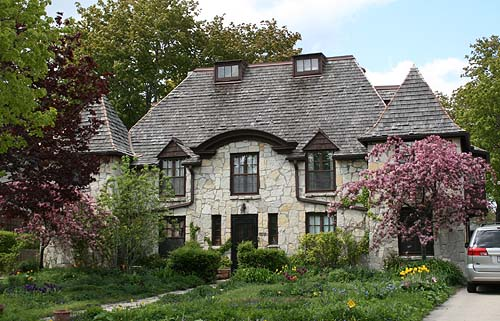
Thomas Bossert House in Shorewood

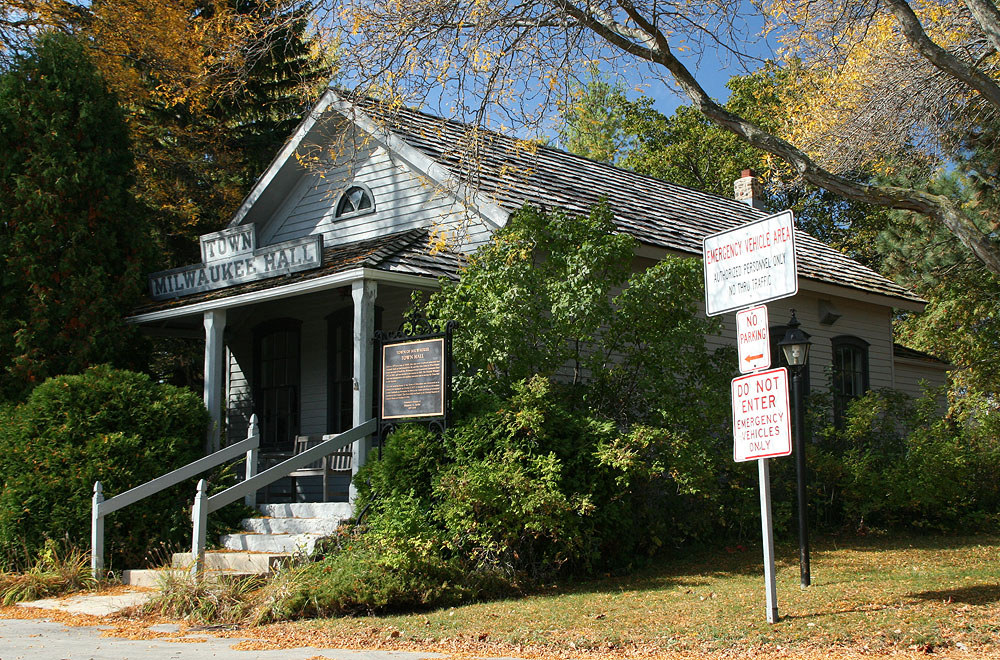
Old town hall of the former town of Milwaukee, now within the city of Glendale

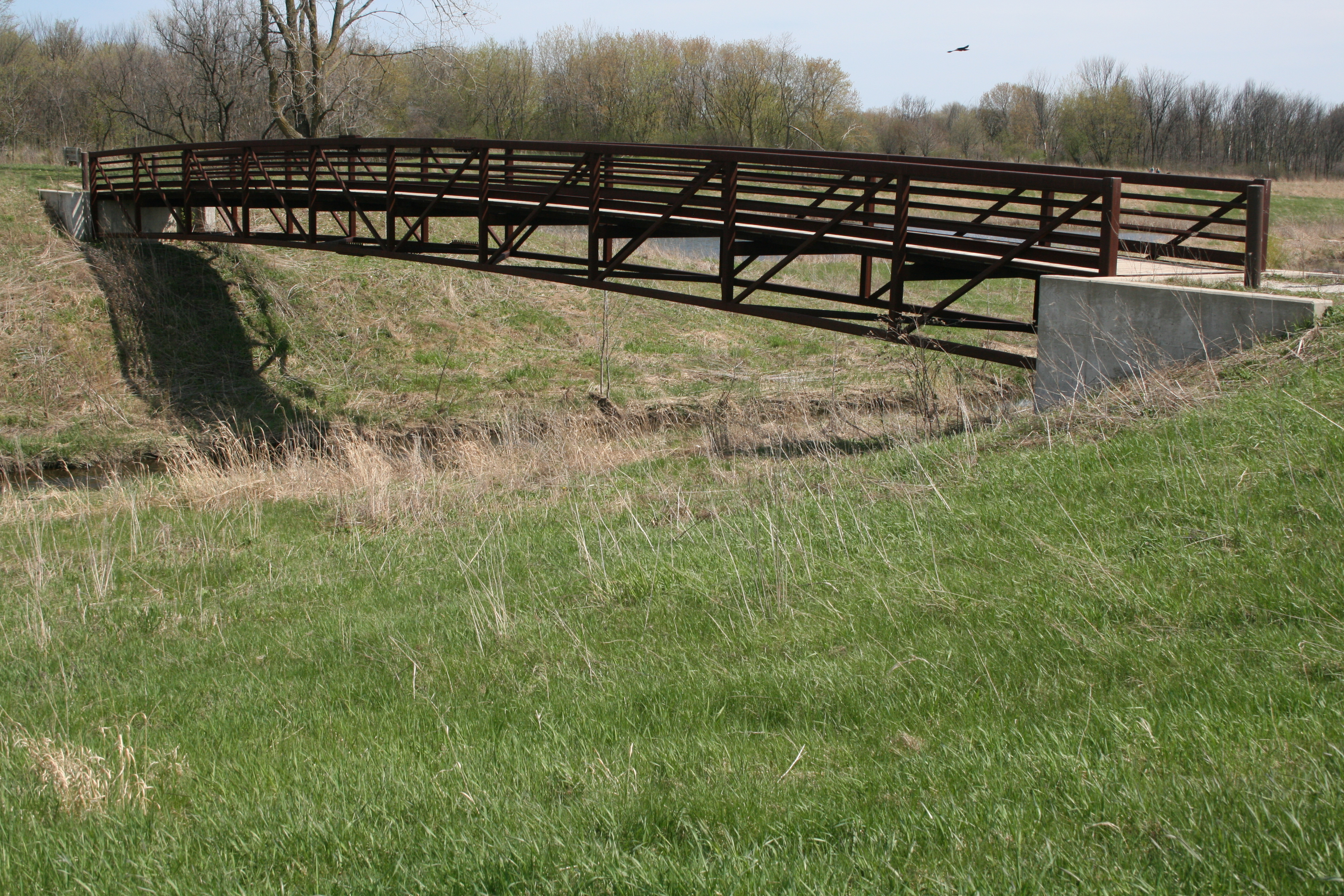
Havenwoods State Forest

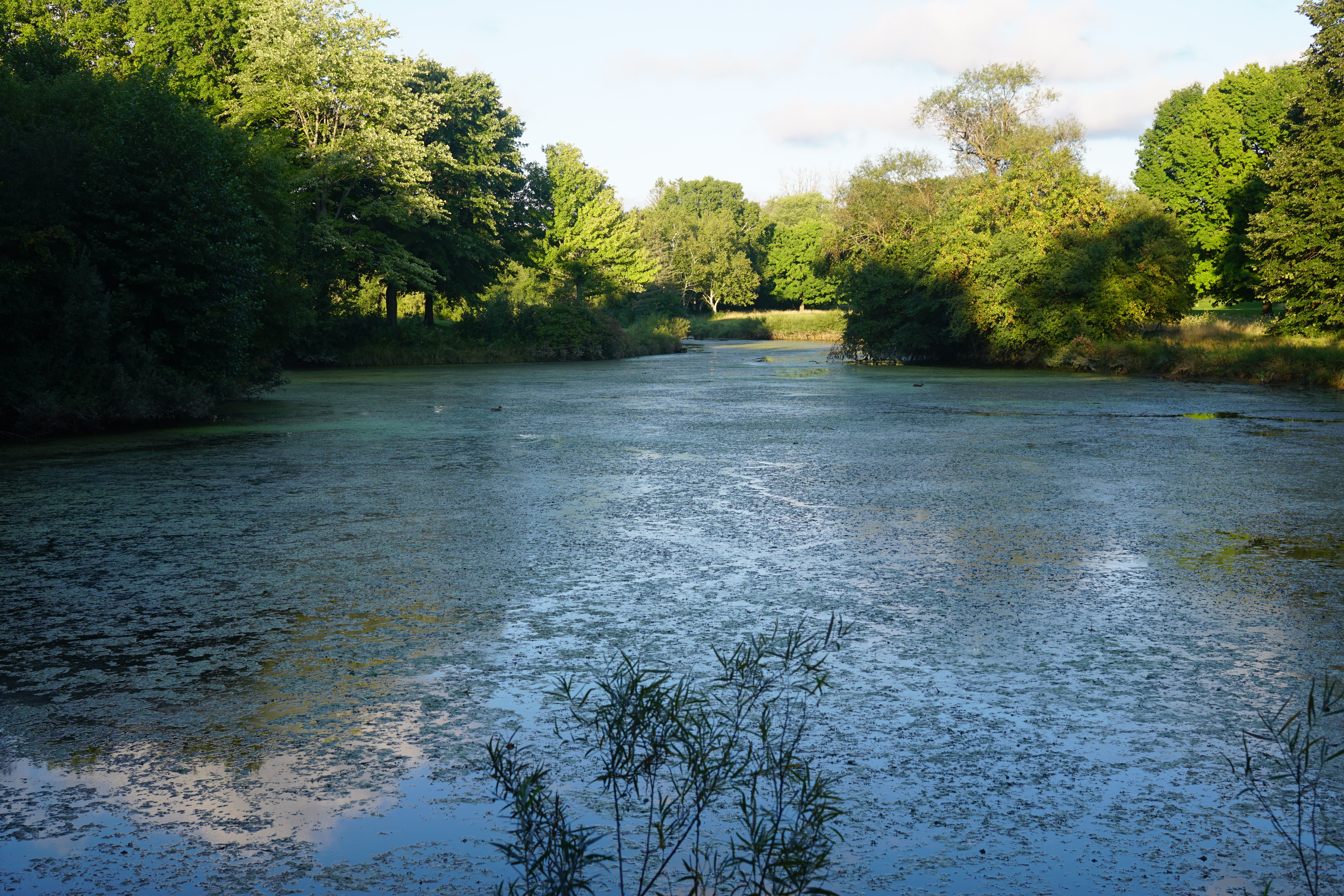
Dretzka Park

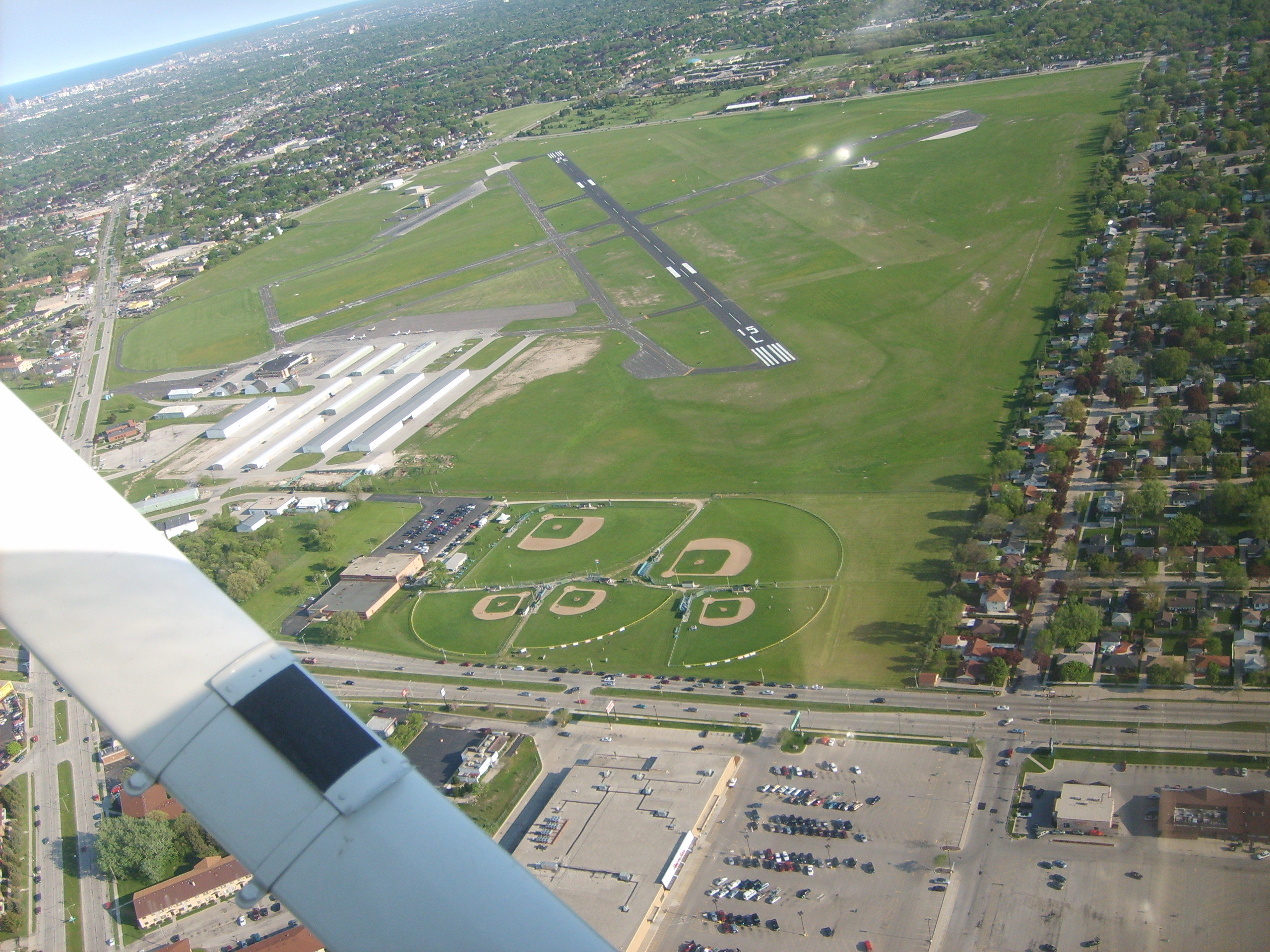
Lawrence J. Timmerman Airport

== Past senators ==
At the time of the creation of the state of Wisconsin, the 4th Senate District was defined in the Constitution as consisting of Fond du Lac and Winnebago counties. In the first two sessions of the state legislature, the 4th District was represented by:

- Warren Chase, 1848–1849 (Democrat) of Ceresco. He joined the new Free Soil Party, and ran in 1849 (unsuccessfully) as the Free Soil candidate for Governor. He was succeeded by
- John A. Eastman, 1850–1851 (Democrat) of Fond du Lac
- Bertine Pinckney, 1852 (Whig) of Rosendale

The Senate was redistricted from 19 to 25 districts before the 1853 session; the old 4th Senate District was now the 20th and 21st Districts, and the new 4th District consisted of the Towns of Erin, Richfield, Germantown, Jackson, Polk, Hartford, Addison, West Bend, Newark, Trenton, Farmington, Kewaskum and Wayne, in Washington County, formerly part of the original 11th District. The new 4th was represented by:

- Baruch Schleisinger Weil, 1853 (Democrat) of West Bend
- Baltus Mantz, 1854 (Democrat) of Meeker (died in office of cholera)
- James Rolfe, 1855 (independent)
- Baruch Schleisinger Weil, 1856 now living in Schleisingerville

For the 1857 session, the Senate was expanded to 30 seats; the new 4th district included all of Washington County now, and once more elected:

- Baruch Schleisinger Weil, 1857
- Densmore Maxon, 1858–1861 (Democrat) of Cedar Creek

As of 1862, the Senate expanded to 33 seats, a size it would retain well into the 21st century; the 4th District remained unchanged. It elected:

- Frederick Thorpe, 1862–1867 (Democrat) of West Bend
- Adam Schantz, 1868–1871 (Democrat) of Addison

In 1871, the Senate was drastically redistricted. Washington County became part of a revised 33rd District. A new 4th District was created, consisting of Monroe and Vernon Counties (formerly parts of the 31st and 30th Districts respectively). This new district elected:

- William Nelson, 1872–1873 (Republican) of Viroqua
- Adelbert Bleekman, 1874–1875 (Republican) of Tomah

In 1876, the District lost Monroe County, and gained Crawford County instead. The new district elected:

- J. Henry Tate, 1876–1877 (Republican) of Viroqua
- George W. Swain, 1878–1879 (Republican) of Chaseburg
- Ormsby Thomas, 1880–1881 (Republican) of Prairie du Chien
- Van S. Bennett, 1882–1883 (Republican) of Rockton
- Joseph W. Hoyt, 1885–1888 (Republican) of Chaseburg

In 1887, the Senate districts were again totally revamped; the new 4th District consisted of the 1st, 6th, 9th, 13th and 18th Wards of Milwaukee (the old 4th was split between new 16th and 31st Districts). It elected

- John J. Kempf, 1889–1892 (Republican)

In 1891 and 1892, the Senate was redistricted; after lawsuits, the 4th District lost the 6th and 9th Wards, gaining the 3rd and 7th Wards instead. It elected:

- James W. Murphy, 1893–1894 (Democrat) of Milwaukee
- James C. Officer, 1895–1896 (Republican) of Milwaukee

By 1896, the Milwaukee portion of the 4th District had been reduced to the 6th, 13th, 18th and 21st Wards, but it gained Whitefish Bay, and the Towns of Granville and Milwaukee.

- J. Herbert Green, 1897–1903 (Republican) of Milwaukee

After the 1901 redistricting, the 4th consisted of Milwaukee's 1st, 13th, 18th and 21st Wards and added the Villages of East Milwaukee and North Milwaukee.

- J. Herbert Green was re-elected in 1902 from the new district
- Henry Bodenstab, 1909–1912 (Republican) of Milwaukee
- William L. Richards, 1913–1916 (Republican)of Milwaukee
- Herman C. Schultz, 1917–1920 (Republican) of Milwaukee
- Oscar Morris, 1921–1938 (Republican) of Milwaukee

After the 1921 redistricting, the 4th lost Milwaukee's 1st Ward, but gained its 25th, and lost Granville and North Milwaukee (the former East Milwaukee was now Shorewood). This district re-elected Morris for over a decade to come. By the 1931 redistricting, the City of Milwaukee portion of the 4th was reduced to the 13th, 18th and 21st Wards, but the district included the Town of Milwaukee and the village of Shorewood, plus the addition of the villages of Fox Point and River Hills. It continued to elect Oscar Morris until his 1939 death in office.

- Milton T. Murray, 1939–1944 (Republican) of Milwaukee
- John C. McBride, 1945–1948 (Republican) of Milwaukee
- George A. Mayer, 1949–1952 (Republican) of Milwaukee
- Harry F. Franke Jr., 1953–1956 (Republican) of Milwaukee

The 1950s was a period of redistricting plans, referendums and lawsuits. By 1954, the 4th District still had three Milwaukee Wards (the 1st, 18th and 20th), Fox Point, River Hills, Shorewood, and Whitefish Bay, and added Bayside, Brown Deer, and Glendale (which between them had absorbed all of the old Town of Milwaukee). This new 4th District elected:

- Kirby Hendee, 1957–1960 (Republican) of Milwaukee
- Jerris Leonard, 1961–1969 (Republican) of Milwaukee

After more lawsuits and failure by the legislature to act, in 1964 the Wisconsin Supreme Court reapportioned the legislative districts for the 1964 elections. The 3rd and 18th Wards of the City of Milwaukee, the part of Bayside in Milwaukee County, Brown Deer, Fox Point, River Hills, Shorewood and Whitefish Bay became the new 4th.

- Jerris Leonard was re-elected from the new district.
- Nile Soik, 1969–1973 (Republican) of Whitefish Bay

In 1971, the legislature was reapportioned without incident. The new 4th encompassed the seven North Shore suburbs, but also Thiensville, Mequon, and eight townships in Southeastern Washington County, from Erin in the southwest to Farmington in the northeast. This new district elected:

- Bob Kasten, 1973–1974 (Republican) of Brown Deer, who left when he was elected to Congress. A special election was held, electing:
- Jim Sensenbrenner, 1975-1979 (Republican) of Shorewood, who in turn resigned when he was elected to Kasten's old seat in Congress. He was succeeded in another special election by:
- Rod Johnston, 1979–1984 (Republican) of Whitefish Bay

In 1984, an election was held under a plan passed by the legislature in 1983, under which the 4th consisted of the North Shore suburbs east of Brown Deer and Glendale, plus part of Milwaukee's inner city and the East Side of Milwaukee east of the Milwaukee River south to where the river flows into Milwaukee's harbor.

- Barbara Ulichny, 1985–1993 (Democrat) of Milwaukee

A 1992 court-ordered redistricting moved most of the district west of the Milwaukee River, except for Glendale and part of Shorewood, and added a large slice of the inner city, extending at its westmost to the county line with Waukesha County. This new 4th elected:

- Gwen Moore, 1993–2004 (Democrat) of Milwaukee

A new court-ordered map was created in 2002, by which the District was moved even further west into the inner city and out to 124th Street. In 2004, it elected Lena Taylor, the present incumbent. The 2011 redistricting expanded the portion of the district in the inner city, while still retaining Shorewood and part of Glendale. Taylor was re-elected from that district in 2012.

Note: the boundaries of districts have changed over history. Previous politicians of a specific numbered district have represented a completely different geographic area, due to redistricting.

Senator	Party	Notes	Session	Years	District Definition
District created				1848	Fond du Lac & Winnebago counties
Warren Chase	Dem.		1st	1848	Fond du Lac & Winnebago counties
Warren Chase	Dem.		2nd	1849	Fond du Lac & Winnebago counties
John A. Eastman	Dem.		3rd	1850	Fond du Lac & Winnebago counties
John A. Eastman	Dem.		4th	1851	Fond du Lac & Winnebago counties
Bertine Pinckney	Whig	Redistricted to 20th district.	5th	1852	Fond du Lac & Winnebago counties
Baruch S. Weil	Dem.		6th	1853	1852–1855 1855–1860 1861–1865 1866–1870; Washington County
Baltus Mantz	Dem.	Died in office.	7th	1854	1852–1855 1855–1860 1861–1865 1866–1870; Washington County
--Vacant--			7th	1854	1852–1855 1855–1860 1861–1865 1866–1870; Washington County
James Rolfe	Ind.		8th	1855	1852–1855 1855–1860 1861–1865 1866–1870; Washington County
Baruch S. Weil	Dem.		9th	1856	1852–1855 1855–1860 1861–1865 1866–1870; Washington County
Baruch S. Weil	Dem.		10th	1857	1852–1855 1855–1860 1861–1865 1866–1870; Washington County
Densmore Maxon	Dem.		11th	1858	1852–1855 1855–1860 1861–1865 1866–1870; Washington County
Densmore Maxon	Dem.		12th	1859	1852–1855 1855–1860 1861–1865 1866–1870; Washington County
Densmore Maxon	Dem.		13th	1860	1852–1855 1855–1860 1861–1865 1866–1870; Washington County
Densmore Maxon	Dem.		14th	1861	1852–1855 1855–1860 1861–1865 1866–1870; Washington County
Frederick Thorpe	Dem.		15th	1862	1852–1855 1855–1860 1861–1865 1866–1870; Washington County
Frederick Thorpe	Dem.		16th	1863	1852–1855 1855–1860 1861–1865 1866–1870; Washington County
Frederick Thorpe	Dem.		17th	1864	1852–1855 1855–1860 1861–1865 1866–1870; Washington County
Frederick Thorpe	Dem.		18th	1865	1852–1855 1855–1860 1861–1865 1866–1870; Washington County
Frederick Thorpe	Dem.		19th	1866	1852–1855 1855–1860 1861–1865 1866–1870; Washington County
Frederick Thorpe	Dem.		20th	1867	1852–1855 1855–1860 1861–1865 1866–1870; Washington County
Adam Schantz	Dem.		21st	1868	1852–1855 1855–1860 1861–1865 1866–1870; Washington County
Adam Schantz	Dem.		22nd	1869	1852–1855 1855–1860 1861–1865 1866–1870; Washington County
Adam Schantz	Dem.		23rd	1870	1852–1855 1855–1860 1861–1865 1866–1870; Washington County
Adam Schantz	Dem.		24th	1871	1852–1855 1855–1860 1861–1865 1866–1870; Washington County
William Nelson	Rep.		25th	1872	Monroe & Vernon counties
William Nelson	Rep.		26th	1873	Monroe & Vernon counties
Adelbert Bleekman	Rep.		27th	1874	Monroe & Vernon counties
Adelbert Bleekman	Rep.		28th	1875	Monroe & Vernon counties
J. Henry Tate	Rep.		29th	1876	Monroe & Vernon counties
J. Henry Tate	Rep.		30th	1877	1876–1881 1882–1887; Crawford & Vernon counties
George W. Swain	Rep.		31st	1878	1876–1881 1882–1887; Crawford & Vernon counties
George W. Swain	Rep.		32nd	1879	1876–1881 1882–1887; Crawford & Vernon counties
Ormsby B. Thomas	Rep.		33rd	1880	1876–1881 1882–1887; Crawford & Vernon counties
Ormsby B. Thomas	Rep.		34th	1881	1876–1881 1882–1887; Crawford & Vernon counties
Van S. Bennett	Rep.		35th	1882	1876–1881 1882–1887; Crawford & Vernon counties
Van S. Bennett	Rep.		36th	1883–1884	1876–1881 1882–1887; Crawford & Vernon counties
Joseph W. Hoyt	Rep.		37th	1885–1886	1876–1881 1882–1887; Crawford & Vernon counties
Joseph W. Hoyt	Rep.		38th	1887–1888	1876–1881 1882–1887; Crawford & Vernon counties
John J. Kempf	Rep.		39th	1889–1890	Central Milwaukee County: Wards 1, 6, 9, 13, 18, city of Milwaukee
John J. Kempf	Rep.		40th	1891–1892	Central Milwaukee County: Wards 1, 6, 9, 13, 18, city of Milwaukee
James W. Murphy	Dem.	Resigned	41st	1893–1894	Central Milwaukee County: Wards 1, 3, 7, 13, 18, city of Milwaukee
James C. Officer	Rep.	Won 1894 special election.	42nd	1895–1896	Central Milwaukee County: Wards 1, 3, 7, 13, 18, city of Milwaukee
J. Herbert Green	Rep.		43rd	1897–1898	Northern Milwaukee County: Town of Granville; Town of Milwaukee; Wards 6, 13, 18, 21, city of Milwaukee
J. Herbert Green	Rep.		44th	1899–1900	Northern Milwaukee County: Town of Granville; Town of Milwaukee; Wards 6, 13, 18, 21, city of Milwaukee
J. Herbert Green	Rep.		45th	1901–1902	Northern Milwaukee County: Town of Granville; Town of Milwaukee; Wards 6, 13, 18, 21, city of Milwaukee
J. Herbert Green	Rep.		46th	1903–1904	Northern Milwaukee County: Town of Granville; Town of Milwaukee; Village of East Milwaukee; Village of North Milwaukee; Village of Whitefish Bay; Wards 1, 13, 18, 21, city of Milwaukee
Theodore C. Froemming	Rep.		47th	1905–1906	Northern Milwaukee County: Town of Granville; Town of Milwaukee; Village of East Milwaukee; Village of North Milwaukee; Village of Whitefish Bay; Wards 1, 13, 18, 21, city of Milwaukee
Theodore C. Froemming	Rep.		48th	1907–1908	Northern Milwaukee County: Town of Granville; Town of Milwaukee; Village of East Milwaukee; Village of North Milwaukee; Village of Whitefish Bay; Wards 1, 13, 18, 21, city of Milwaukee
Henry Bodenstab	Rep.		49th	1909–1910	Northern Milwaukee County: Town of Granville; Town of Milwaukee; Village of East Milwaukee; Village of North Milwaukee; Village of Whitefish Bay; Wards 1, 13, 18, 21, city of Milwaukee
Henry Bodenstab	Rep.		50th	1911–1912	Northern Milwaukee County: Town of Granville; Town of Milwaukee; Village of East Milwaukee; Village of North Milwaukee; Village of Whitefish Bay; Wards 1, 13, 18, 21, city of Milwaukee
William L. Richards	Rep.		51st	1913–1914	Northern Milwaukee County: Town of Granville; Town of Milwaukee; Village of East Milwaukee; Village of North Milwaukee; Village of Whitefish Bay; Wards 13, 18, 21, 25, city of Milwaukee
William L. Richards	Rep.		52nd	1915–1916	Northern Milwaukee County: Town of Granville; Town of Milwaukee; Village of East Milwaukee; Village of North Milwaukee; Village of Whitefish Bay; Wards 13, 18, 21, 25, city of Milwaukee
Herman C. Schultz	Rep.		53rd	1917–1918	Northern Milwaukee County: Town of Granville; Town of Milwaukee; Village of East Milwaukee; Village of North Milwaukee; Village of Whitefish Bay; Wards 13, 18, 21, 25, city of Milwaukee
Herman C. Schultz	Rep.		54th	1919–1920	Northern Milwaukee County: Town of Granville; Town of Milwaukee; Village of East Milwaukee; Village of North Milwaukee; Village of Whitefish Bay; Wards 13, 18, 21, 25, city of Milwaukee
Oscar Morris	Rep.	Died in office	55th	1921–1922	Northern Milwaukee County: Town of Granville; Town of Milwaukee; Village of East Milwaukee; Village of North Milwaukee; Village of Whitefish Bay; Wards 13, 18, 21, 25, city of Milwaukee
Oscar Morris	Rep.	Died in office	56th	1923–1924	Northeast Milwaukee County: Town of Milwaukee; Village of Shorewood; Village of Whitefish Bay; Wards 13, 18, 21, 25, city of Milwaukee
Oscar Morris	Rep.	Died in office	57th	1925–1926	Northeast Milwaukee County: Town of Milwaukee; Village of Shorewood; Village of Whitefish Bay; Wards 13, 18, 21, 25, city of Milwaukee
Oscar Morris	Rep.	Died in office	58th	1927–1928	Northeast Milwaukee County: Town of Milwaukee; Village of Shorewood; Village of Whitefish Bay; Wards 13, 18, 21, 25, city of Milwaukee
Oscar Morris	Rep.	Died in office	59th	1929–1930	Northeast Milwaukee County: Town of Milwaukee; Village of Shorewood; Village of Whitefish Bay; Wards 13, 18, 21, 25, city of Milwaukee
Oscar Morris	Rep.	Died in office	60th	1931–1932	Northeast Milwaukee County: Town of Milwaukee; Village of Shorewood; Village of Whitefish Bay; Wards 13, 18, 21, 25, city of Milwaukee
Oscar Morris	Rep.	Died in office	61st	1933–1934	Northeast Milwaukee County: Town of Milwaukee; Village of Fox Point; Village of River Hills; Village of Shorewood; Village of Whitefish Bay; Wards 13, 18, 21, city of Milwaukee
Oscar Morris	Rep.	Died in office	62nd	1935–1936	Northeast Milwaukee County: Town of Milwaukee; Village of Fox Point; Village of River Hills; Village of Shorewood; Village of Whitefish Bay; Wards 13, 18, 21, city of Milwaukee
Oscar Morris	Rep.	Died in office	63rd	1937–1938	Northeast Milwaukee County: Town of Milwaukee; Village of Fox Point; Village of River Hills; Village of Shorewood; Village of Whitefish Bay; Wards 13, 18, 21, city of Milwaukee
--Vacant--			64th	1939–1940	Northeast Milwaukee County: Town of Milwaukee; Village of Fox Point; Village of River Hills; Village of Shorewood; Village of Whitefish Bay; Wards 13, 18, 21, city of Milwaukee
Milton T. Murray	Rep.	Won 1939 special election.	64th	1939–1940	Northeast Milwaukee County: Town of Milwaukee; Village of Fox Point; Village of River Hills; Village of Shorewood; Village of Whitefish Bay; Wards 13, 18, 21, city of Milwaukee
Milton T. Murray	Rep.	Won 1939 special election.	65th	1941–1942	Northeast Milwaukee County: Town of Milwaukee; Village of Fox Point; Village of River Hills; Village of Shorewood; Village of Whitefish Bay; Wards 13, 18, 21, city of Milwaukee
Milton T. Murray	Rep.	Won 1939 special election.	66th	1943–1944	Northeast Milwaukee County: Town of Milwaukee; Village of Fox Point; Village of River Hills; Village of Shorewood; Village of Whitefish Bay; Wards 13, 18, 21, city of Milwaukee
John C. McBride	Rep.		67th	1945–1946	Northeast Milwaukee County: Town of Milwaukee; Village of Fox Point; Village of River Hills; Village of Shorewood; Village of Whitefish Bay; Wards 13, 18, 21, city of Milwaukee
John C. McBride	Rep.		68th	1947–1948	Northeast Milwaukee County: Town of Milwaukee; Village of Fox Point; Village of River Hills; Village of Shorewood; Village of Whitefish Bay; Wards 13, 18, 21, city of Milwaukee
George A. Mayer	Rep.		69th	1949–1950	Northeast Milwaukee County: Town of Milwaukee; Village of Fox Point; Village of River Hills; Village of Shorewood; Village of Whitefish Bay; Wards 13, 18, 21, city of Milwaukee
George A. Mayer	Rep.		70th	1951–1952	Northeast Milwaukee County: Town of Milwaukee; Village of Fox Point; Village of River Hills; Village of Shorewood; Village of Whitefish Bay; Wards 13, 18, 21, city of Milwaukee
Harry F. Franke Jr.	Rep.		71st	1953–1954	Northeast Milwaukee County: Town of Milwaukee; Village of Fox Point; Village of River Hills; Village of Shorewood; Village of Whitefish Bay; Wards 13, 18, 21, city of Milwaukee
Harry F. Franke Jr.	Rep.		72nd	1955–1956	Northern Milwaukee County: Town of Granville; Town of Milwaukee; Village of Bayside; Village of Brown Deer; Village of Fox Point; Village of River Hills; Village of Shorewood; Village of Whitefish Bay; City of Glendale; Wards 1, 18, 20, city of Milwaukee
Kirby Hendee	Rep.		73rd	1957–1958	Northern Milwaukee County: Town of Granville; Town of Milwaukee; Village of Bayside; Village of Brown Deer; Village of Fox Point; Village of River Hills; Village of Shorewood; Village of Whitefish Bay; City of Glendale; Wards 1, 18, 20, city of Milwaukee
Kirby Hendee	Rep.		74th	1959–1960	Northern Milwaukee County: Town of Granville; Town of Milwaukee; Village of Bayside; Village of Brown Deer; Village of Fox Point; Village of River Hills; Village of Shorewood; Village of Whitefish Bay; City of Glendale; Wards 1, 18, 20, city of Milwaukee
Jerris Leonard	Rep.		75th	1961–1962	Northern Milwaukee County: Town of Granville; Town of Milwaukee; Village of Bayside; Village of Brown Deer; Village of Fox Point; Village of River Hills; Village of Shorewood; Village of Whitefish Bay; City of Glendale; Wards 1, 18, 20, city of Milwaukee
Jerris Leonard	Rep.		76th	1963–1964	Northern Milwaukee County: Town of Granville; Town of Milwaukee; Village of Bayside; Village of Brown Deer; Village of Fox Point; Village of River Hills; Village of Shorewood; Village of Whitefish Bay; City of Glendale; Wards 1, 18, 20, city of Milwaukee
Jerris Leonard	Rep.		77th	1965–1966	Northern Milwaukee County: Village of Bayside; Village of Brown Deer; Village of Fox Point; Village of River Hills; Village of Shorewood; Village of Whitefish Bay; Wards 3, 18, city of Milwaukee
Jerris Leonard	Rep.		78th	1967–1968	Northern Milwaukee County: Village of Bayside; Village of Brown Deer; Village of Fox Point; Village of River Hills; Village of Shorewood; Village of Whitefish Bay; Wards 3, 18, city of Milwaukee
Nile Soik	Rep.		79th	1969–1970	Northern Milwaukee County: Village of Bayside; Village of Brown Deer; Village of Fox Point; Village of River Hills; Village of Shorewood; Village of Whitefish Bay; Wards 3, 18, city of Milwaukee
Nile Soik	Rep.		80th	1971–1972	Northern Milwaukee County: Village of Bayside; Village of Brown Deer; Village of Fox Point; Village of River Hills; Village of Shorewood; Village of Whitefish Bay; Wards 3, 18, city of Milwaukee
Robert W. Kasten	Rep.	Resigned after election to U.S. House.	81st	1973–1974	Northeast Milwaukee County: Village of Bayside; Village of Brown Deer; Village of Fox Point; Village of River Hills; Village of Shorewood; Village of Whitefish Bay; City of Glendale; Wards 2, 18, 20, city of Milwaukee; South Ozaukee County: Village of Thiensville; Most of the city of Mequon; Southeast Washington County: Town of Erin; Town of Farmington; Town of Germantown; Town of Polk; Town of Richfield; Town of Trenton; Town of West Bend; Village of Germantown; Village of Jackson; Village of Slinger
--Vacant--			82nd	1975–1976	
Jim Sensenbrenner	Rep.	Won 1975 special election. Resigned after election to U.S. House.	82nd	1975–1976	
Jim Sensenbrenner	Rep.	Won 1975 special election. Resigned after election to U.S. House.	83rd	1977–1978	
--Vacant--			84th	1979–1980	
Rod Johnston	Rep.	Won 1979 special election.	84th	1979–1980	
Rod Johnston	Rep.	Won 1979 special election.	85th	1981–1982	
Rod Johnston	Rep.	Won 1979 special election.	86th	1983–1984	Northeast Milwaukee County: Village of Bayside; Village of Brown Deer; Village of Fox Point; Village of River Hills; Village of Shorewood; Village of Whitefish Bay; City of Glendale; Part of the city of Milwaukee
Barbara Ulichny	Dem.		87th	1985–1986	Northeast Milwaukee County: Village of Bayside; Village of Brown Deer; Village of Fox Point; Village of River Hills; Village of Shorewood; Village of Whitefish Bay; City of Glendale; Part of the city of Milwaukee
Barbara Ulichny	Dem.		88th	1987–1988	Northeast Milwaukee County: Village of Bayside; Village of Brown Deer; Village of Fox Point; Village of River Hills; Village of Shorewood; Village of Whitefish Bay; City of Glendale; Part of the city of Milwaukee
Barbara Ulichny	Dem.		89th	1989–1990	Northeast Milwaukee County: Village of Bayside; Village of Brown Deer; Village of Fox Point; Village of River Hills; Village of Shorewood; Village of Whitefish Bay; City of Glendale; Part of the city of Milwaukee
Barbara Ulichny	Dem.		90th	1991–1992	Northeast Milwaukee County: Village of Bayside; Village of Brown Deer; Village of Fox Point; Village of River Hills; Village of Shorewood; Village of Whitefish Bay; City of Glendale; Part of the city of Milwaukee
Gwen Moore	Dem.		91st	1993–1994	Northern Milwaukee County: Ward 12, village of Shorewood; Wards 1, 2, 7, city of Glendale; Part of the city of Milwaukee
Gwen Moore	Dem.		92nd	1995–1996	Northern Milwaukee County: Ward 12, village of Shorewood; Wards 1, 2, 7, city of Glendale; Part of the city of Milwaukee
Gwen Moore	Dem.		93rd	1997–1998	Northern Milwaukee County: Ward 12, village of Shorewood; Wards 1, 2, 7, city of Glendale; Part of the city of Milwaukee
Gwen Moore	Dem.		94th	1999–2000	Northern Milwaukee County: Ward 12, village of Shorewood; Wards 1, 2, 7, city of Glendale; Part of the city of Milwaukee
Gwen Moore	Dem.		95th	2001–2002	Northern Milwaukee County: Ward 12, village of Shorewood; Wards 1, 2, 7, city of Glendale; Part of the city of Milwaukee
Gwen Moore	Dem.		96th	2003–2004	Northwest Milwaukee County: Wards 1, 6, 12, city of Glendale; Part of the city of Milwaukee; Wards 23, 24, city of Wauwatosa
Lena Taylor	Dem.	Elected 2004. Re-elected 2008, 2012, 2016, 2020. Resigned Jan. 2024.	97th	2005–2006	Northwest Milwaukee County: Wards 1, 6, 12, city of Glendale; Part of the city of Milwaukee; Wards 23, 24, city of Wauwatosa
Lena Taylor	Dem.	Elected 2004. Re-elected 2008, 2012, 2016, 2020. Resigned Jan. 2024.	98th	2007–2008	Northwest Milwaukee County: Wards 1, 6, 12, city of Glendale; Part of the city of Milwaukee; Wards 23, 24, city of Wauwatosa
Lena Taylor	Dem.	Elected 2004. Re-elected 2008, 2012, 2016, 2020. Resigned Jan. 2024.	99th	2009–2010	Northwest Milwaukee County: Wards 1, 6, 12, city of Glendale; Part of the city of Milwaukee; Wards 23, 24, city of Wauwatosa
Lena Taylor	Dem.	Elected 2004. Re-elected 2008, 2012, 2016, 2020. Resigned Jan. 2024.	100th	2011–2012	Northwest Milwaukee County: Wards 1, 6, 12, city of Glendale; Part of the city of Milwaukee; Wards 23, 24, city of Wauwatosa
Lena Taylor	Dem.	Elected 2004. Re-elected 2008, 2012, 2016, 2020. Resigned Jan. 2024.	101st	2013–2014	Northwest Milwaukee County: Wards 1, 2, 6, 7, 12, 18, city of Glendale; Part of the city of Milwaukee; Wards 80, 81, city of Wauwatosa
Lena Taylor	Dem.	Elected 2004. Re-elected 2008, 2012, 2016, 2020. Resigned Jan. 2024.	102nd	2015–2016	Northwest Milwaukee County: Wards 1, 2, 6, 7, 12, 18, city of Glendale; Part of the city of Milwaukee; Wards 80, 81, city of Wauwatosa
Lena Taylor	Dem.	Elected 2004. Re-elected 2008, 2012, 2016, 2020. Resigned Jan. 2024.	103rd	2017–2018	Northwest Milwaukee County: Wards 1, 2, 6, 7, 12, 18, city of Glendale; Part of the city of Milwaukee; Wards 80, 81, city of Wauwatosa
Lena Taylor	Dem.	Elected 2004. Re-elected 2008, 2012, 2016, 2020. Resigned Jan. 2024.	104th	2019–2020	Northwest Milwaukee County: Wards 1, 2, 6, 7, 12, 18, city of Glendale; Part of the city of Milwaukee; Wards 80, 81, city of Wauwatosa
Lena Taylor	Dem.	Elected 2004. Re-elected 2008, 2012, 2016, 2020. Resigned Jan. 2024.	105th	2021–2022	Northwest Milwaukee County: Wards 1, 2, 6, 7, 12, 18, city of Glendale; Part of the city of Milwaukee; Wards 80, 81, city of Wauwatosa
Lena Taylor	Dem.	Elected 2004. Re-elected 2008, 2012, 2016, 2020. Resigned Jan. 2024.	106th	2023–2024	Northern Milwaukee County
--Vacant--			106th	2023–2024	Northern Milwaukee County
Dora Drake	Dem.	Won 2024 special election. Re-elected 2024.	107th	2025–2026	

== See also ==
- Political subdivisions of Wisconsin
