= J. Henry Tate =

19th century American politician

Member of the Wisconsin Senate from the 4th district
- In office January 3, 1876 – January 7, 1878
- Preceded by: Adelbert Bleekman
- Succeeded by: George W. Swain

Member of the Wisconsin State Assembly from the Vernon 2nd district
- In office January 6, 1873 – January 5, 1874
- Preceded by: Henry A. Chase
- Succeeded by: Edgar Eno

Personal details
- Born: March 5, 1830 Landgrove, Vermont, U.S.
- Died: April 18, 1918 (aged 88) St. Joseph, Missouri, U.S.
- Resting place: Viroqua Cemetery, Viroqua, Wisconsin
- Party: Republican

Military service
- Allegiance: United States
- Branch/service: United States Volunteers; Union Army
- Rank: 1st Lieutenant, USV
- Unit: 2nd Reg. R.I. Vol. Infantry
- Battles/wars: American Civil War

James Henry Tate (March 5, 1830 – April 18, 1918) was an American merchant, farmer, and Republican politician. He was a member of the Wisconsin State Senate (1876 & 1877) and Assembly (1873), representing Vernon County.

== Biography ==
Born in Landgrove, Vermont, where he was raised on his family's farm, he moved to Boston, Massachusetts, in 1847 where he was a clerk. In 1849, he moved to California and then back to Boston. In 1860, Tate moved to Rhode Island. During the American Civil War, he enlisted in the 2nd Rhode Island Infantry and was a commissary sergeant. Then, in 1865, Tate settled in Viroqua, Wisconsin, where he owned a store. He also owned another store in Cashton, Wisconsin. Tate served in the Wisconsin State Assembly as a Republican and then served in the Wisconsin State Senate in 1876 and 1877.

Wisconsin State Assembly
Preceded by Henry A. Chase	Member of the Wisconsin State Assembly from the Vernon 2nd district January 6, 1873 – January 5, 1874	Succeeded by Edgar Eno
Wisconsin Senate
Preceded by Adelbert Bleekman	Member of the Wisconsin State Assembly from the 4th district January 3, 1876 – January 7, 1878	Succeeded by George W. Swain
