= Bodenstab =

Bodenstab is a surname. Notable people with the surname include:

- Henry Bodenstab (1874–1948), American politician, son of Julius
- Julius Bodenstab (1834–1916), American politician
