= Senator Frank =

Senator Frank may refer to:

- Donald J. Frank (1937–1995), Minnesota State Senate
- Kurt Frank (born 1945), Wisconsin State Senate
- Pat Frank (politician) (born 1929), Florida State Senate

== See also ==
- Harry F. Franke Jr. (1922–2012), Wisconsin State Senate
