= Herman C. Schultz =

American politician (1860–1935)

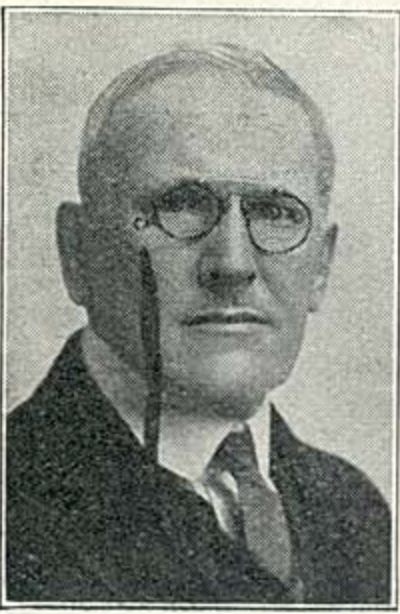
Herman C. Schultz, Milwaukee civil servant and state senator

Herman C. Schultz (July 24, 1860 – December 22, 1935) was an American civil servant from Milwaukee, Wisconsin, who served a single four-year term as a member of the Wisconsin State Senate, towards the end of which he legally changed his name to Senator Schultz.

== Background ==
Schultz was born, in Wittenberge, Kingdom of Prussia on July 24, 1860, but during his infancy moved with his parents to Grabow in Mecklenburg-Schwerin. He received an academic education and went into civil service for six years. In 1882, he came to Milwaukee, and operated an art supplies store with his brother. In 1887, he went into newspaper journalism, and in 1890 became superintendent of the Third Street post office. In 1894, he became a worker in the office of the city clerk. He was appointed secretary of the city Election Commission in Milwaukee upon its 1911 creation, a position he would hold for the rest of his life.

== Politics ==
In 1916, Schultz (a "stalwart"), having won a five-way Republican primary against incumbent William L. Richards (a progressive) and three other candidates, was elected to the 4th district of the Senate (the Towns of Granville and Milwaukee; Villages of North Milwaukee, East Milwaukee and Whitefish Bay; and the 13th, 18th, 21st and 25th Wards of the City of Milwaukee) in the 1916 general election, with 6,804 votes to 4,408 for Social Democrat Osmore Smith. He was assigned to the standing committee on corporations.

As secretary of the Milwaukee city election commission, he encouraged the adoption of tabulating machines to count votes. In January 1920, Schultz chaired the Wisconsin state chapter of the Committee of 48, an organization to unite liberals and progressives in Wisconsin in "a political campaign for real reconstruction". In February 1920, it was speculated that he would not seek reelection to the state senate so that his continued service as secretary of the election commission would not be challenged. He in fact was not a candidate in 1920, and was succeeded by fellow Republican Oscar Morris. He remained secretary of the Election Commission.

== Outside the Senate ==
On January 16, 1920 Schultz filed papers to change his name to Senator Schultz, stating that there were too many Herman Schultzes in Milwaukee, and he was tired of reading about criminal cases involving people of that name in which he had no part.

In 1925, Schultz was a strong supporter of universal postal voting in Wisconsin. He died December 22, 1935, in a Milwaukee hospital, after an unspecified long illness.
