= James Rolfe (legislator) =

American politician

James Rolfe (1821 – April 1, 1888) was an American farmer from Polk, Wisconsin, who spent a single one-year term in 1855 as an independent member of the Wisconsin State Senate from the 4th District.

== Background ==
Rolfe, born in Hillsboro, Massachusetts, in 1821, was the son of Stephen and Mary A. (Reed) Rolfe. He came to Wisconsin Territory in 1846, and located in Milwaukee, living there for seven years, when he moved to the town of Polk and acquired 400 acres of land. In 1849 he married Matilda Meade.

== Public service ==
In November 1854 Rolfe was one of three committee members appointed by Washington County's Board of Supervisors who negotiated a final settlement of financial controversies deriving from the division of Ozaukee County from that county in the spring of 1853. He held various town offices as well.

At the time of Rolfe's 1854 election to the Senate, the 4th District consisted of the Towns of Erin, Richfield, Germantown, Jackson, Polk, Hartford, Addison, West Bend, Newark, Trenton, Farmington, Kewaskum and Wayne, in Washington County It had been represented by Baltus Mantz, a Democrat from Meeker who died in office of cholera.

Rolfe was succeeded in 1856 by former incumbent Baruch Schleisinger Weil, a Democrat from Schleisingerville.

== After the Senate ==
Matilda Rolfe died in 1859, by which time the two of them had had four children, three daughters and one son. Rolfe died on April 1, 1888, at the Rock County Asylum in Johnstown Center, Wisconsin.
