= Milton T. Murray =

American politician (1898–1991)

Official portrait, 1940

Milton T. Murray (June 1, 1898 – October 3, 1991) was a teacher, lawyer and politician from Milwaukee, Wisconsin. Murray served as a member of the Wisconsin Senate, and twice unsuccessfully sought the Republican nomination for governor of Wisconsin (running in the primaries of 1942 and 1944).

== Early life, education, and career ==
Born in Milwaukee, Murray went to University of Wisconsin–Milwaukee, Marquette University, and the University of Chicago. He worked as a teacher and coach and then went into the practice of law. He served in the Wisconsin State Assembly before getting elected to the Wisconsin Senate.

== Wisconsin State Senate ==
Murray was elected to the Wisconsin State Senate's 4th District (the thirteenth, eighteenth, and twenty-first wards of the City of Milwaukee; and the Villages of Fox Point, River Hills, Shorewood, Whitefish Bay, and the Town of Milwaukee) in 1939 to fill the vacancy created by the death of incumbent Oscar Morris. He was re-elected in 1940 for a full term, with 24,919 votes to 9,258 for Democrat Thomas Nimlos and 8,346 for Progressive nominee Anton Blechinger.

== 1942 and 1944 gubernatorial campaigns ==
Murray was a candidate in the Republican primary for Governor of Wisconsin twice. In 1942 he challenged incumbent Julius P. Heil, coming in second in a three-way race, with 95,908 votes to Heil's 136,980 and 32,740 for a third candidate; reporters speculated that Murray's high results in normally Progressive districts were the product of mischievous votes from Progressives (who did not have a contest on their ballot line). Heil went on to lose to Progressive Orland Steen Loomis in the general election. In 1944, rather than run for re-election, Murray challenged Acting Governor Walter Samuel Goodland, and came in third in a five-man race.

Milton was reported as a possible candidate in the 1945 Wisconsin Supreme Court election, but did not ultimately run.
