= James Rolfe (disambiguation) =

James Rolfe (born 1980) is an American filmmaker, actor, and the creator of the web series Angry Video Game Nerd.

James Rolfe may also refer to:

- James Rolfe (composer) (born 1961), Canadian composer
- James Rolfe (legislator) (1821–1888), early member of the Wisconsin State Senate
- Jimmy Rolfe (born 1932), former professional footballer

== See also ==
- James Rolph (1869–1934), 27th governor of California and Mayor of San Francisco
