= Herman Schultz =

Herman Schultz may refer to:

- Shocker (character), a Marvel Comics supervillain with the alter ego Herman Schultz
- Herman Schultz (sport shooter) (1901–?), Monegasque sports shooter
- Herman C. Schultz (1860–?), member of the Wisconsin State Senate
- Herman Schultz (astronomer) (1823–1890), Swedish astronomer
