= Densmore Maxon =

American politician (1820–1887)

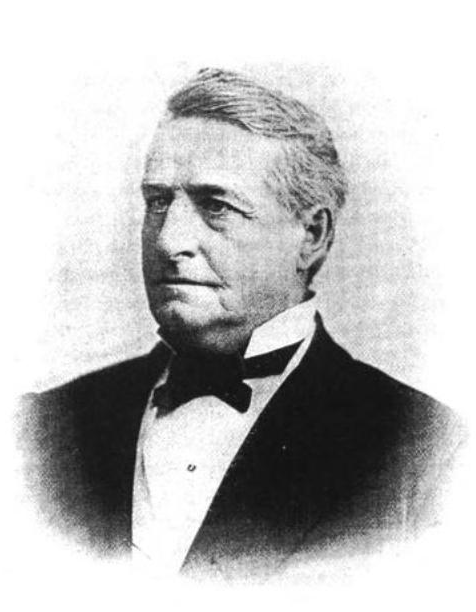
- Portrait from A Political History of Wisconsin (1900)

Member of the Wisconsin Senate from the 4th district
- In office January 4, 1858 – January 6, 1862
- Preceded by: Baruch S. Weil
- Succeeded by: Frederick Thorpe

Member of the Wisconsin State Assembly from the Washington 1st district district
- In office January 2, 1882 – January 1, 1883
- Preceded by: John F. Schwalbach
- Succeeded by: George Noller
- In office January 1, 1872 – January 6, 1873
- Preceded by: Baruch S. Weil
- Succeeded by: Hiram Wilson Sawyer

Member of the Wisconsin State Assembly from the Washington 2nd district district
- In office January 7, 1867 – January 1, 1872
- Preceded by: Mitchel L. Delaney
- Succeeded by: Baruch S. Weil

Member of the Wisconsin State Assembly from the Washington 4th district district
- In office January 5, 1852 – January 3, 1853
- Preceded by: John C. Toll
- Succeeded by: William P. Barnes
- In office June 5, 1848 – January 1, 1849
- Preceded by: Position established
- Succeeded by: Patrick Toland

Personal details
- Born: Densmore William Maxon; September 30, 1820 Verona, New York, U.S.
- Died: March 21, 1887 (aged 66) Santa Cruz, California, U.S.
- Resting place: Cedar Creek Cemetery, Cedar Creek, Wisconsin
- Party: Democratic
- Spouse: Elizabeth Turck (died 1913)
- Children: 8

Densmore William Maxon (September 30, 1820 – March 21, 1887) was an American farmer, Democratic politician, and Wisconsin pioneer. He served 9 years in the Wisconsin State Assembly and 4 years in the State Senate, representing Washington County.

== Background ==
Maxon was born in Verona, Oneida County, New York, in 1820. He was educated at the Oneida Conference Seminary at Cazenovia, New York, and became a farmer. He moved to Wisconsin Territory in 1843, and first settled at Milwaukee and was appointed deputy county surveyor in 1843; but removed to Cedar Creek, Washington County, in 1846.

== Political career ==
Maxon was Town Chairman of Polk from 1846 to 1859. He was first elected a member of the Assembly in the first state legislative elections for the new state of Wisconsin, held in February 1848, and went on to serve in the 1st Wisconsin Legislature. He was subsequently elected to another one-year term in the 5th Wisconsin Legislature (1852), and was elected to two terms as Washington County's representative in the Wisconsin Senate, serving from 1858 through 1861.

In 1865, he was the Democratic candidate for Lieutenant Governor of Wisconsin, but was defeated by Republican Wyman Spooner. Following the 1866 redistricting, he was again elected to the State Assembly, serving six consecutive terms (1867–1873). He was elected to a final term in 1881, receiving 797 votes to 613 votes for Republican Jacob H. Goelzer, and 72 for Greenbacker H. A. Forbes. In 1882, he was assigned to the joint committee on charitable and penal institutions.

== Outside the legislature ==
In May, 1868 Maxon was appointed by President Andrew Johnson as a member of the board of visitors to attend the annual examination at the United States Military Academy at West Point. In the 1880s he was one of the Commissioners of the Wisconsin Farm Mortgage Land Company, a state commission. He died in 1887 in Santa Cruz, California, and was buried in Cedar Creek, Wisconsin.

Party political offices
Preceded by Nelson Dewey	Democratic nominee for Lieutenant Governor of Wisconsin; 1865	Succeeded by Gilbert L. Park
Wisconsin State Assembly
State government established	Member of the Wisconsin State Assembly from the Washington 4th district June 5, 1848 – January 1, 1849	Succeeded by Patrick Toland
Preceded by John C. Toll	Member of the Wisconsin State Assembly from the Washington 4th district January 5, 1852 – January 3, 1853	Succeeded by William P. Barnes
Preceded by Mitchel L. Delaney	Member of the Wisconsin State Assembly from the Washington 2nd district January 7, 1867 – January 1, 1872	Succeeded by Baruch S. Weil
Preceded by Baruch S. Weil	Member of the Wisconsin State Assembly from the Washington 1st district January 1, 1872 – January 6, 1873	Succeeded by Hiram Wilson Sawyer
Preceded by John F. Schwalbach	Member of the Wisconsin State Assembly from the Washington 1st district January 2, 1882 – January 1, 1883	Succeeded by George Noller
Wisconsin Senate
Preceded by Baruch S. Weil	Member of the Wisconsin Senate from the 4th district January 4, 1858 – January 6, 1862	Succeeded by Frederick Thorpe
