= Senator Hendee =

Senator Hendee may refer to:

- George Whitman Hendee (1832–1906), Vermont State Senate
- Kirby Hendee (1923–2016), Wisconsin State Senate
