= Baruch Schleisinger Weil =

American politician (1802–1893)

Baruch S. Weil
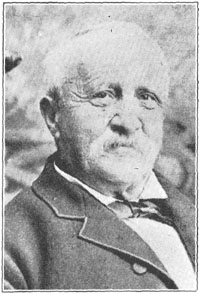

Member of the Wisconsin Senate from the 4th district
- In office January 7, 1856 – January 4, 1858
- Preceded by: James Rolfe
- Succeeded by: Densmore Maxon
- In office January 3, 1853 – January 2, 1854
- Preceded by: Bertine Pinckney
- Succeeded by: Baltus Mantz

Member of the Wisconsin State Assembly from the Washington 2nd district
- In office January 5, 1880 – January 3, 1881
- Preceded by: John G. Frank
- Succeeded by: Joseph W. Holehouse
- In office January 1, 1872 – January 5, 1874
- Preceded by: Densmore Maxon
- Succeeded by: Jeremiah Riordan

Member of the Wisconsin State Assembly from the Washington 4th district
- In office January 3, 1852 – January 2, 1853
- Preceded by: John C. Toll
- Succeeded by: Charles Schuette

Personal details
- Born: Baruch Schleisinger; June 29, 1802 Strasbourg, Alsace, France
- Died: March 28, 1893 (aged 90) Chicago, Illinois, U.S.
- Party: Democratic

Baruch Schleisinger Weil (born Baruch Schleisinger; June 29, 1802 – March 28, 1893) was an Alsatian American immigrant, farmer, real estate broker, and politician. He is the founder and namesake of Slinger, Wisconsin (originally "Schleisingerville"); he served three years in the Wisconsin Senate and four years in the state Assembly representing Washington County. He sometimes used the alias Benjamin S. Weil, or abbreviated his name B. S. Weil.

== Biography ==
Born in Strasbourg, Alsace, France, in a Jewish family, as Baruch Schleisinger, he legally changed his name to Baruch Schleisinger Weil. In 1843, he emigranted to the United States, settling first in New York City and then in New Orleans. Then in 1845 he moved to Wisconsin Territory. Weil platted the village of Schleisingerville, Wisconsin (now Slinger, Wisconsin) in Washington County, Wisconsin, where he had various business interests. Since the nearest Jewish community was in Milwaukee, he arranged for teachers to come the roughly 35 miles by ox team to instruct his children.

In 1853, 1856, 1857, Weil served as a Democratic member of the Wisconsin State Senate from Washington County's 4th Senate District. He also served in the Wisconsin State Assembly in 1852, 1871–1873, and 1880.

Weil served in the Wisconsin Militia as a brigadier general. Eventually Weil and his family moved to West Bend, Wisconsin and then to Milwaukee, Wisconsin. Weil died in Chicago, Illinois, on March 28, 1893, and is buried at Greenwood Cemetery in Milwaukee.
