= Senator McBride (disambiguation) =

George W. McBride (1854–1911) was a U.S. Senator from Oregon from 1895 to 1901.

Senator McBride may also refer to:

- David McBride (born 1942), Delaware State Senate
- John C. McBride (1908–1979), Wisconsin State Senate
- John R. McBride (1832–1904), Oregon State Senate
- Robert McBride (politician) (1856–1934), Northern Irish Senate
- Sarah McBride (born 1990), Delaware State Senate

== See also ==
- Archibald McBryde (1766–1836), North Carolina
