= Adelbert Bleekman =

19th century American politician

District Attorney of Monroe County, Wisconsin
- In office January 1, 1877 – January 1, 1879
- Preceded by: Joseph McKeen Morrow
- Succeeded by: Joseph McKeen Morrow

Member of the Wisconsin Senate from the 4th district
- In office January 5, 1874 – January 3, 1876
- Preceded by: William Nelson
- Succeeded by: J. Henry Tate

Member of the Wisconsin State Assembly from the Monroe 2nd district
- In office January 6, 1873 – January 5, 1874
- Preceded by: John Fletcher Richards
- Succeeded by: Thomas McCaul

Personal details
- Born: March 26, 1846 Salisbury, Herkimer County, New York, U.S.
- Died: January 27, 1908 (aged 61) La Crosse, Wisconsin, U.S.
- Resting place: Woodlawn Cemetery, Sparta, Wisconsin
- Party: Republican
- Spouses: Eliza Farnham (died 1875); Alice Bush (m. 1876–1908)
- Children: with Eliza Farnham; William Ernest Bleekman^{(b. 1872; died 1956)}; with Alice Bush; Kathy Marston Bleekman^{(died 1878)}; Adelbert E. Bleekman Jr.^{(b. 1879; died 1946)}; Ruth Bleekman^{(b. 1881; died 1908)}
- Education: Albert College
- Profession: Lawyer

Military service
- Allegiance: United States
- Branch/service: United States Volunteers; Union Army
- Years of service: 1864–1865
- Rank: Private, USV
- Unit: 2nd Reg. Ohio Vol. Cavalry
- Battles/wars: American Civil War: Overland Campaign; Siege of Petersburg

Adelbert E. Bleekman, Sr., (March 26, 1846 – January 27, 1908) was an American lawyer and Republican politician. He was a member of the Wisconsin State Senate (1874 and 1875) and State Assembly (1873), and served as district attorney of Monroe County, Wisconsin.

== Early life and war service ==
Adelbert Bleekman was born on March 26, 1846, in Salisbury, Herkimer County, New York. As a child, in 1850, he moved with his parents to Ohio, where he was raised and educated.

At age 18, he enlisted for service in the Union Army in the fourth year of the American Civil War. He was enrolled as a private in Company A of the 2nd Ohio Cavalry Regiment and went to the front in the eastern theater of the war. With his regiment, he participated in the bloody battles of Ulysses S. Grant's Overland Campaign, which culminated in the Siege of Petersburg in the Summer of 1864. In June 1864, his regiment participated in the Wilson–Kautz Raid against Confederate railroad lines supplying Petersburg and Richmond. During that fight, he was shot in the leg and severely wounded. He was sent home to Wisconsin to recuperate and never returned to the fighting. He officially mustered out in June 1865.

== Legal and political career ==
Returning from the war, Bleekman resumed his education. He studied at the academy at Little Falls, New York, then attended Albert College in Belleville, Ontario. In 1869, he moved to Tomah, Wisconsin, where he taught school for two years while studying the law. He was admitted to the bar in September 1870 and opened a law office in Tomah the following year.

He was active with the Republican Party of Wisconsin and was elected to the Wisconsin State Assembly in 1872, running on the Republican ticket. In the 26th Wisconsin Legislature, he represented Monroe County's 2nd Assembly district, comprising roughly the eastern half of Monroe County.

In 1873, he was the Republican nominee for Wisconsin State Senate in the 4th Senate district—comprising Monroe and Vernon counties. He was unopposed in the general election, and served a two year term.

He did not run for re-election in 1875, and moved to Sparta, Wisconsin, that year. He continued his legal practice in Sparta, making a partnership with F. H. Bloomingdale known as Bleekman & Bloomingdale. In 1876, he returned to politics and was elected district attorney of Monroe County, serving a two-year term.

Bleekman moved to La Crosse, Wisconsin, in 1886, where he remained for the rest of his life.

== Personal life and family ==
Bleekman was the eldest of three sons born to Warren Bleekman and his first wife, Amanda (née Jacobs). Bleekman's paternal grandfather, Ebenezer Bleekman, served in the War of 1812 and fought at the Second Battle of Sacket's Harbor. His great-grandfather, Daniel Bleekman, was a Dutch American immigrant and served in the American Revolutionary War.

Adelbert Bleekman married twice. His first wife was Eliza Farnham of Belleville, Ontario. They had one son together before her death in April 1875. The next year, Bleekman married Alice Bush of Tomah, Wisconsin. With his second wife, Bleekman had three more children, though their first daughter died in infancy.

He was active throughout his life with the Grand Army of the Republic veterans organization, and was commander of the Sparta, Wisconsin, post in 1883 and 1884. He was also a member of the Independent Order of Odd Fellows and the masons.

Adelbert Bleekman, Sr., died at his home in La Crosse on January 27, 1908, after six years of illness which had ended his legal career.

== Electoral history ==
=== Wisconsin Assembly (1872) ===
Wisconsin Assembly, Monroe 2nd District Election, 1872
Party	Candidate	Votes	%	±%
General Election, November 5, 1872
Republican	Adelbert Bleekman	948	54.06%	−5.72%
Democratic	R. P. Hitchcock	701	45.94%	
Plurality		158	8.11%	-11.44%
Total votes		1,948	100.0%	+83.95%
Republican hold				

=== Wisconsin Senate (1873) ===
Wisconsin Senate, 4th District Election, 1873
Party	Candidate	Votes	%	±%
General Election, November 4, 1873
Republican	Adelbert Bleekman	4,283	100.0%	
Total votes		4,283	100.0%	+2.12%
Republican hold				

Wisconsin State Assembly
Preceded by John Fletcher Richards	Member of the Wisconsin State Assembly from the Monroe 2nd district January 6, 1873 – January 5, 1874	Succeeded by Thomas McCaul
Wisconsin Senate
Preceded by William Nelson	Member of the Wisconsin Senate from the 4th district January 5, 1874 – January 3, 1876	Succeeded by J. Henry Tate
Legal offices
Preceded by Joseph McKeen Morrow	District Attorney of Monroe County, Wisconsin; January 1, 1877 – January 1, 1879	Succeeded by Joseph McKeen Morrow
