= Theodore C. Froemming =

American politician (1873–1929)

Member of the Wisconsin Senate from the 4th district
- In office January 2, 1905 – January 4, 1909
- Preceded by: J. Herbert Green
- Succeeded by: Henry Bodenstab

Personal details
- Born: May 11, 1873 Milwaukee, Wisconsin, U.S.
- Died: October 2, 1929 (aged 56)
- Resting place: Lincoln Memorial Cemetery, Milwaukee
- Party: Republican
- Spouse: Bertha Bluhm (m. 1898–1929)
- Children: Manila (Best)^{(b. 1898; died 1991)}; Theodore R. Froemming^{(b. 1906; died 1987)}; Gilbert Irvine Froemming^{(b. 1908; died 1980)}
- Occupation: Contractor

Theodore Charles Froemming (May 11, 1873 – October 2, 1929) was an American building contractor and Republican politician from Milwaukee, Wisconsin. He represented northern Milwaukee County in the Wisconsin State Senate during the 1905 and 1907 sessions.

== Biography ==
Theodore Froemming was born in Milwaukee, Wisconsin, in May 1873. He was educated in a parochial school, then graduated from the Milwaukee Business University and attended Concordia University Wisconsin. He worked as a building contractor and also managed a stone quarry.

He became active with the Republican Party of Wisconsin and in 1898 he was elected to the Republican county committee in Milwaukee. He was then elected to the Milwaukee City Council in 1900 and re-elected in 1902; he represented the 21st ward, which then comprised a segment of the city's north side, on the west bank of the Milwaukee River.

In 1904, he was the Republican nominee for Wisconsin State Senate in the 4th Senate district—comprising roughly the northern quarter of Milwaukee County. At the general election, he prevailed with 43% of the vote in a three-way race. He was the youngest member of the State Senate in 1905, when he was 32. He was not a candidate for re-election in 1908.

At the time of his election, the state Republican Party was enduring a bitter split between the progressive wing led by Governor Robert M. La Follette and the conservative or "stalwart" wing. La Follotte's faction held 16 Senate seats (one less than needed for a majority), and Froemming was one of a handful in the middle who were courted by both factions. After a series of compromises, Froemming sided with the La Follette faction.

== Electoral history ==
=== Wisconsin Senate (1904) ===
Wisconsin Senate, 4th District Election, 1904
Party	Candidate	Votes	%	±%
General Election, November 8, 1904
Republican	Theodore C. Froemming	5,246	43.26%	−8.26%
Democratic	Herman Reel	3,697	30.49%	−10.18%
Social Democratic	Alexis Fischer	3,184	26.26%	+18.43%
Plurality		1,549	12.77%	+1.92%
Total votes		12,127	100.0%	+0.17%
Republican hold				

Wisconsin Senate
Preceded by J. Herbert Green	Member of the Wisconsin Senate from the 4th district January 2, 1905 – January 4, 1909	Succeeded by Henry Bodenstab
