= Charles A. W. Krauss =

American politician

Charles A. W. Krauss (October 24, 1851 – January 1, 1939) was an American businessman, carpenter contractor, and politician.

Born in the town of Milwaukee, Milwaukee County, Wisconsin, Krauss went to the Milwaukee Public Schools and the Spencerian Business College. Krauss was in the real estate and loan business. He was also a travel agent and a carpenter contractor. Krauss served on the Milwaukee Town Board and was a justice of the peace. In 1897, Krauss served in the Wisconsin State Assembly and was a Republican. Krauss died at his home in Milwaukee, Wisconsin.
