= Kirby Hendee =

American politician

Member of the Wisconsin Senate from the 4th district
- In office 1957–1960
- Preceded by: Harry F. Franke, Jr.
- Succeeded by: Jerris Leonard

Personal details
- Born: March 12, 1923 Milwaukee, Wisconsin, U.S.
- Died: March 11, 2016 (aged 92) Madison, Wisconsin, U.S.
- Party: Republican
- Education: College of the Holy Cross (BA); University of Michigan (LLB)
- Profession: Lawyer

Kirby Hendee (March 12, 1923 – March 11, 2016) was an American lawyer and politician.

== Biography ==
Hendee was born in Milwaukee, Wisconsin. He graduated from Shorewood High School in Shorewood, Wisconsin and later graduated from the College of the Holy Cross and the University of Michigan Law School, after which he became a practicing attorney and lobbyist.

During World War II, Hendee served in the United States Army. Hendee was a member of the Society of the Holy Name and the Knights of Columbus. Hendee served in the Wisconsin State Senate in 1957 and was a Republican. During his time in the state legislature, he was the youngest Republican in the state senate. In 1960, Hendee was a candidate for the United States House of Representatives from Wisconsin's 5th congressional district, losing to incumbent Henry S. Reuss. Hendee died on March 11, 2016, in Madison, Wisconsin.
