= Landgrove, Vermont =

- Town
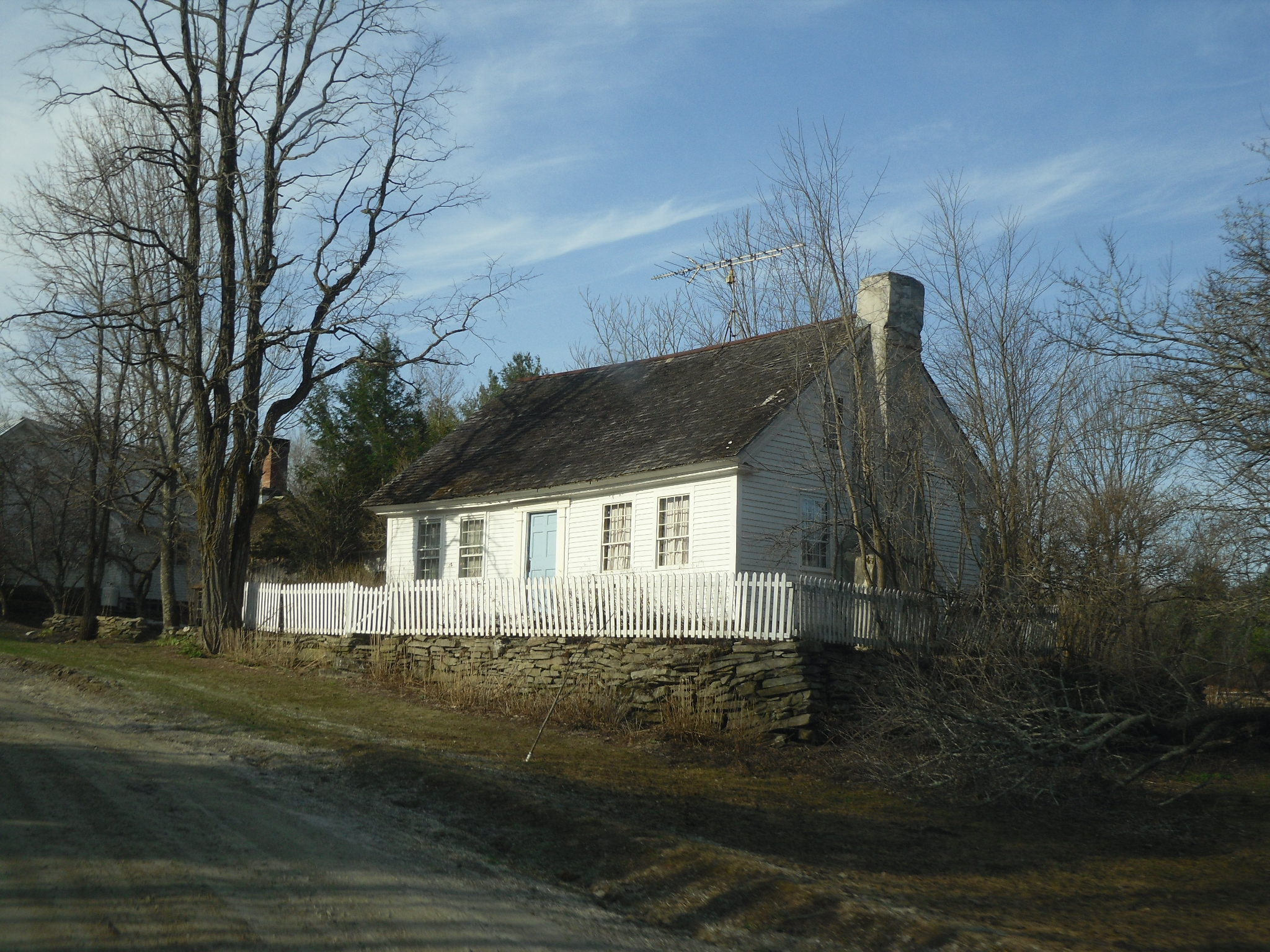
- Building in Landgrove

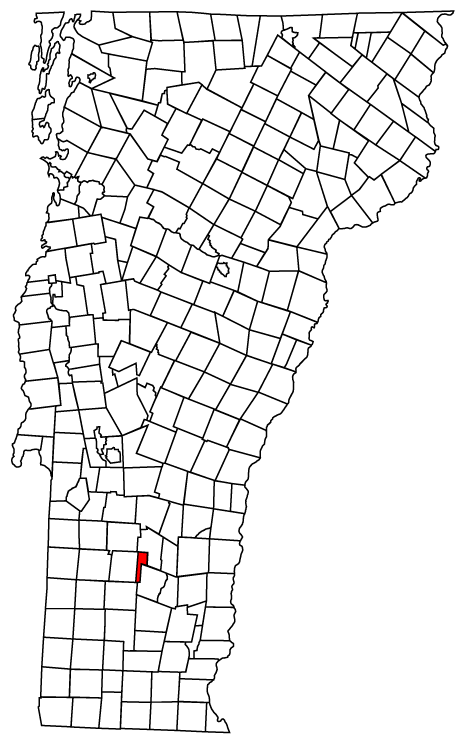
- Landgrove, Vermont
- Coordinates: 43°14′40″N 72°51′08″W
- Country: United States
- State: Vermont
- County: Bennington
- Chartered: 1780
- Organized: 1800
- Community: North Landgrove

Area
  - Total: 9.2 sq mi (23.7 km^{2})
  - Land: 9.1 sq mi (23.6 km^{2})
  - Water: 0.039 sq mi (0.1 km^{2})
- Elevation: 1,532 ft (467 m)

Population (2020)
  - Total: 177
  - Density: 19/sq mi (7.5/km^{2})
- Time zone: UTC-5 (Eastern (EST))
  - Summer (DST): UTC-4 (EDT)
- ZIP codes: 05152 (Peru); 05148 (Londonderry)
- Area code: 802
- FIPS code: 50-39025
- GNIS feature ID: 1462131
- Website: landgrove.vermont.gov

Landgrove is a town in Bennington County, Vermont, United States. The population was 177 at the 2020 census.

== Geography ==
Landgrove occupies a small area in the northeastern corner of Bennington County, bordered by the town of Weston in Windsor County to the north and east, Londonderry in Windham County to the east and south, and in Bennington County the town of Peru to the west and a small portion of Winhall to the south.

The only centralized community in the town is North Landgrove, next to Utley Brook. Vermont Route 11 crosses the southern part of the town, where it is only 0.8 miles (1.3 km) wide.

According to the United States Census Bureau, the town has a total area of 9.2 square miles (23.7 km^{2}), of which 9.1 square miles (23.6 km^{2}) is land and 0.04 square miles (0.1 km^{2}), or 0.44%, is water.

== Demographics ==
Historical population
Census	Pop.	Note	%±
1790	31		—
1800	147		374.2%
1810	299		103.4%
1820	341		14.0%
1830	355		4.1%
1840	345		−2.8%
1850	337		−2.3%
1860	320		−5.0%
1870	302		−5.6%
1880	246		−18.5%
1890	220		−10.6%
1900	225		2.3%
1910	160		−28.9%
1920	143		−10.6%
1930	104		−27.3%
1940	64		−38.5%
1950	80		25.0%
1960	49		−38.7%
1970	104		112.2%
1980	121		16.3%
1990	134		10.7%
2000	144		7.5%
2010	158		9.7%
2020	177		12.0%
U.S. Decennial Census

As of the census of 2000, there were 144 people, 64 households, and 44 families residing in the town. The population density was 15.8 people per square mile (6.1/km^{2}). There were 153 housing units at an average density of 16.8 per square mile (6.5/km^{2}). The racial makeup of the town was 99.31% White and 0.69% Asian.

There were 64 households, out of which 35.9% had children under the age of 18 living with them, 59.4% were married couples living together, 6.3% had a female householder with no husband present, and 31.3% were non-families. 28.1% of all households were made up of individuals, and 9.4% had someone living alone who was 65 years of age or older. The average household size was 2.25 and the average family size was 2.73.

In the town, the age distribution of the population shows 23.6% under the age of 18, 2.1% from 18 to 24, 23.6% from 25 to 44, 37.5% from 45 to 64, and 13.2% who were 65 years of age or older. The median age was 45 years. For every 100 females, there were 100.0 males. For every 100 females age 18 and over, there were 96.4 males.

The median income for a household in the town was $38,750, and the median income for a family was $55,625. Males had a median income of $71,250 versus $31,250 for females. The per capita income for the town was $34,929. There were 7.4% of families and 15.7% of the population living below the poverty line, including 23.8% of under eighteens and none of those over 64.

== Notable people ==
- James Loren Martin, Speaker of the Vermont House of Representatives and judge of the United States District Court for the District of Vermont, was born in Landgrove
- Ben Ogden, 2-time silver medalist in cross-country skiing at the 2026 Winter Olympics.
- J. Henry Tate, Wisconsin businessman and legislator, was born in Landgrove
