= Henry Bodenstab =

20th century American politician (1874–1948)

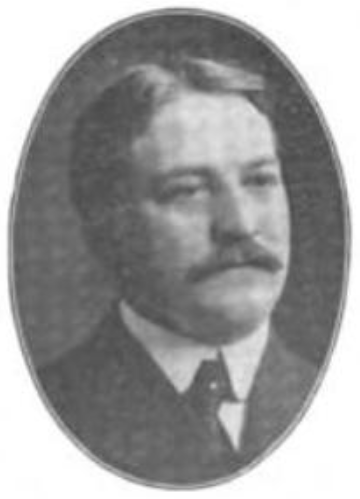

Member of the Wisconsin Senate from the 4th district
- In office January 4, 1909 – January 6, 1913
- Preceded by: Theodore C. Froemming
- Succeeded by: William L. Richards

Personal details
- Born: Henry H. Bodenstab; June 29, 1874 Howards Grove, Wisconsin, U.S.
- Died: December 28, 1948 (aged 74) Milwaukee, Wisconsin, U.S.
- Resting place: Forest Home Cemetery, Milwaukee
- Party: Republican
- Spouse: Anne Lynch (m. 1899–1948)
- Parent: Julius Bodenstab (father)
- Education: University of Michigan Law School
- Occupation: Lawyer, politician

Henry H. Bodenstab (June 29, 1874 – December 28, 1948) was an American lawyer and Republican politician. He served four years in the Wisconsin State Senate, representing the north side of the city of Milwaukee and northern Milwaukee County.

== Biography ==
Bodenstab was born on June 29, 1874, in Howards Grove, Wisconsin. His father, Julius Bodenstab, had just finished his second of two terms as a Liberal Republican member of the Assembly.

He graduated from the University of Michigan Law School in 1898.

He died in Milwaukee on December 28, 1948.

== Career ==
Bodenstab was a member of the Senate from 1909 to 1912. He was a Republican.

He was a candidate for the U.S. House of Representatives in 1919, but was defeated by Victor L. Berger.

Wisconsin Senate
| Preceded by Theodore C. Froemming | Member of the Wisconsin Senate from the 4th district January 4, 1909 – January 6, 1913 | Succeeded by William L. Richards |
