= Fred C. Maertz =

American politician

Fred C. Maertz (February 29, 1852 – May 7, 1925) was an American politician and businessman.

Born in Germany, Maertz and his parents emigrated to the United States in 1852 and settled in Milwaukee, Wisconsin and then settled in Manitowoc County, Wisconsin in 1855. Maertz had gone to business school and was in the lumber business. He was also a merchant. Maertz served as the town chairman of Maple Grove and later village president of Reedsville, Wisconsin. He also served on the Reedsville School Board. In 1897 Maertz served in the Wisconsin State Assembly and was a Democrat. After his term ended, Maertz moved to Milwaukee, Wisconsin and was in the movie theater business in North Milwaukee, Wisconsin. Maertz died of a heart attack in his home in Milwaukee, Wisconsin.
