= Julius Bodenstab =

American politician (1834–1916)

Member of the Wisconsin State Assembly from the Sheboygan 1st district
- In office January 5, 1873 – January 3, 1875
- Preceded by: George W. Weeden
- Succeeded by: Joseph Wedig

Personal details
- Born: January 13, 1834 Ronnenberg, Kingdom of Hanover
- Died: June 1, 1916 (aged 82) Milwaukee, Wisconsin, U.S.
- Resting place: Forest Home Cemetery, Milwaukee
- Party: Republican; Liberal Republican (1871–1873)
- Spouse: Friedericke Schuette (m. 1867–1916)
- Children: Bertha (Herr)^{(b. 1868; died 1929)}; William H. Bodenstab^{(b. 1870; died 1962)}; Henry H. Bodenstab^{(b. 1874; died 1948)}; one other son
- Occupation: Farmer

Military service
- Allegiance: United States
- Branch/service: United States Volunteers; Union Army
- Years of service: 1862–1865
- Rank: 1st Lieutenant, USV
- Unit: 27th Reg. Wis. Vol. Infantry
- Battles/wars: American Civil War

Julius Bodenstab (January 13, 1834 – June 1, 1916) was a German American immigrant, businessman, and Wisconsin pioneer. He was a member of the Wisconsin State Assembly, representing the city of Sheboygan during the 1873 and 1874 sessions. He was the father of Henry Bodenstab, who served four years in the Wisconsin State Senate.

== Background ==
Bodenstab was born January 13, 1834, in Ronnenberg in the Kingdom of Hanover. He came to the United States in 1846 with his parents; they settled briefly in Albany, New York, but in 1847 moved on to the Wisconsin Territory, settling in Hermans Grove in the Town of Herman in Sheboygan County. He received a common school and academic education, and became a farmer.

During the American Civil War, he joined up with a volunteer company from his area, known as the "Herman Tigers". Their company was inducted into the Union Army as Company C in the 27th Wisconsin Infantry Regiment, and Bodenstab was commissioned second lieutenant of the company. He was promoted to first lieutenant and transferred to Company I in March 1863. The 27th Wisconsin Infantry served in the western theater of the war, and participated in the Vicksburg Campaign and operations in Arkansas and Alabama. Bodenstab mustered out with the rest of his regiment in August 1865.

He bought the family farm from his father, who went back to his medical practice. He married Friedericke Schuette, another German American immigrant, in 1867. They would have a family of one girl and three boys.

== Public office ==
Bodenstab served as town clerk and chairman of the town board for Herman.

In 1870 he was the Republican Party nominee for Sheboygan County's 1st Assembly district. He lost in the general election to Democrat Charles Œtling (like himself, a native Hanoverian now living in Herman) with 756 votes to 986 for Œtling.

After redistricting in 1872, Bodenstab made another run for Assembly, but as a member of the Liberal Republican faction. During these years, the Liberal Republicans operated in a short-term coalition with the Wisconsin Democrats known as the Reform Party. Bodenstab defeated his Republican opponent in the general election. Bodentstab was re-elected without opposition in 1873.

He served on the committees on the militia, and on privileges & elections. He did not run for re-election in 1874, and was succeeded by Joseph Wedig, another Reform Party member (and another Hanoverian emigrant).

== After the Assembly ==
Around 1875, he is reported to have sold the farm and gone into the real estate business, including building the Howards Grove Cheese Factory in 1878 (now operated as a museum of early cheesemaking under the name of "The Julius Bodenstab Cheese Factory") and trading in several lots in the nearby hamlet of Franklin in the 1880s.

He eventually moved to Milwaukee. He appears to have kept in contact with family back in Germany, as he sponsored a nephew who arrived in New York Harbor in 1902. In 1904 a private bill was passed by Congress, boosting his monthly pension to $30. In November 1908, his son Henry, an attorney, was elected to a four-year term as a Republican state senator from Milwaukee County.

He died in Milwaukee on June 1, 1916, and is buried in that city's Forest Home Cemetery.

== Electoral history ==
=== Wisconsin Assembly (1870) ===
Wisconsin Assembly, Sheboygan 1st District Election, 1870
Party	Candidate	Votes	%	±%
General Election, November 8, 1870
Democratic	Charles Œtling	986	56.60%	
Republican	Julius Bodenstab	756	43.40%	
Plurality		230	13.20%	
Total votes		1,742	100.0%	
Democratic hold				

=== Wisconsin Assembly (1872, 1873) ===
Wisconsin Assembly, Sheboygan 1st District Election, 1872
Party	Candidate	Votes	%	±%
General Election, November 4, 1872
Liberal Republican	Julius Bodenstab	1,379	68.27%	
Republican	Joseph Schrage	641	31.73%	−17.24%
Plurality		738	36.53%	+34.47%
Total votes		2,020	100.0%	+66.53%
Liberal Republican gain from Democratic				

Wisconsin Assembly, Sheboygan 1st District Election, 1873
Party	Candidate	Votes	%	±%
General Election, November 3, 1873
Liberal Republican	Julius Bodenstab (incumbent)	1,080	100.0%	
Total votes		1,080	100.0%	-46.53%
Liberal Republican hold				

Wisconsin State Assembly
Preceded by George W. Weeden	Member of the Wisconsin State Assembly from the Sheboygan 1st district January 5, 1873 – January 3, 1875	Succeeded by Joseph Wedig
