= Toland's Prairie, Wisconsin =

Settlement in Southeastern Wisconsin

Toland's Prairie
- Unincorporated community (Defunct)
- Etymology: Named for Patrick Toland
- Interactive map of Toland's Prairie
- Coordinates: 43.2386°N 88.4239°W
- Country: United States
- State: Wisconsin
- County: Washington
- Township: Erin
- Established: 1846
- Founder: Patrick Toland

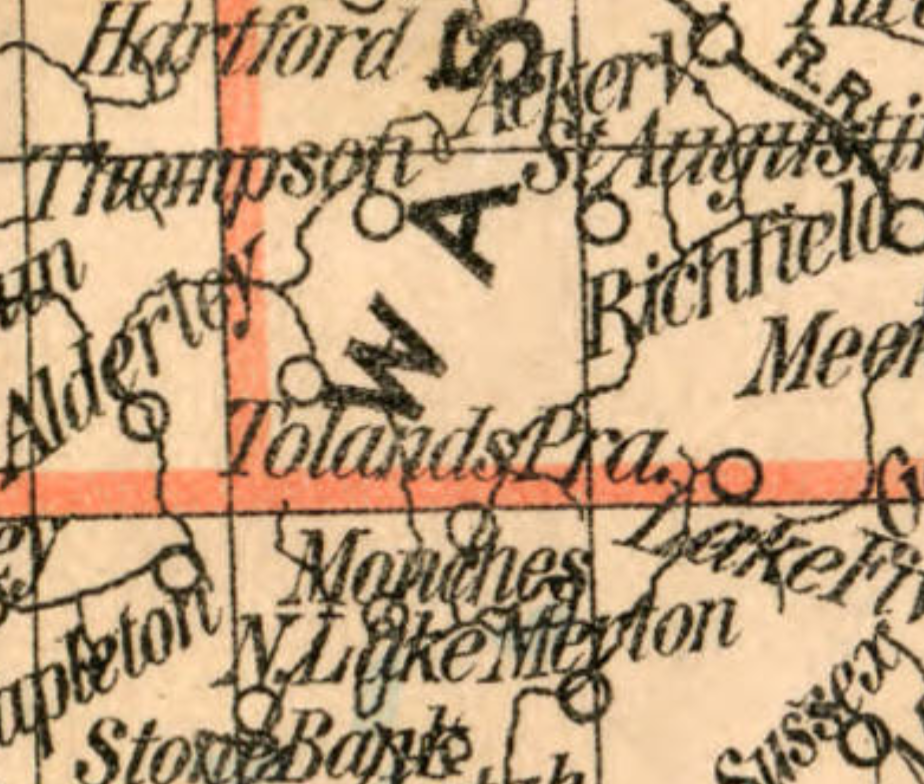
1878 map showing Toland's Prairie Wisconsin and vicinity

Toland's Prairie or Toland Prairie, later Toland, was a rural unincorporated community in Erin township in Washington County, Wisconsin, United States, near the Dodge County line, northwest of Alderley and east of Monches, around the intersection of Clare Lane and Roosevelt Road (Sections 19, 20, 19 and 30). It was named after pioneer farmer and politician Patrick Toland. There was a Toland's Prairie post office from 1846 to 1883; in 1865 the postmaster was John Toland. In 1883 the name was changed, and the Toland post office operated just across the county line in Ashippun from 1883 to 1900.

== Notable people ==
- James Kenealy, state legislator
- Patrick Toland, state legislator (although his mailing address was Erin)
