= Ronnenberg =

- Town
- Coat of arms

- Location of Ronnenberg within Hanover district
- Interactive map of Ronnenberg
- Location within Germany Location within Lower Saxony
- Coordinates: 52°19′10″N 09°39′20″E
- Country: Germany
- State: Lower Saxony
- District: Hanover
- Subdivisions: 7 districts

Government
  - Mayor (2021–26): Marlo Kratzke (SPD)

Area
  - Total: 37.89 km^{2} (14.63 sq mi)
- Elevation: 73 m (240 ft)

Population (2025-12-31)
  - Total: 23,807
  - Density: 628.3/km^{2} (1,627/sq mi)
- Time zone: UTC+01:00 (CET)
  - Summer (DST): UTC+02:00 (CEST)
- Postal codes: 30952
- Dialling codes: 0511, 05109, 05108
- Vehicle registration: H
- Website: www.ronnenberg.de

Ronnenberg (German: [ˈʁɔnənˌbɛʁk]) is a town in Hanover Region, in Lower Saxony, Germany. It is situated approximately 8 km southwest of Hanover.

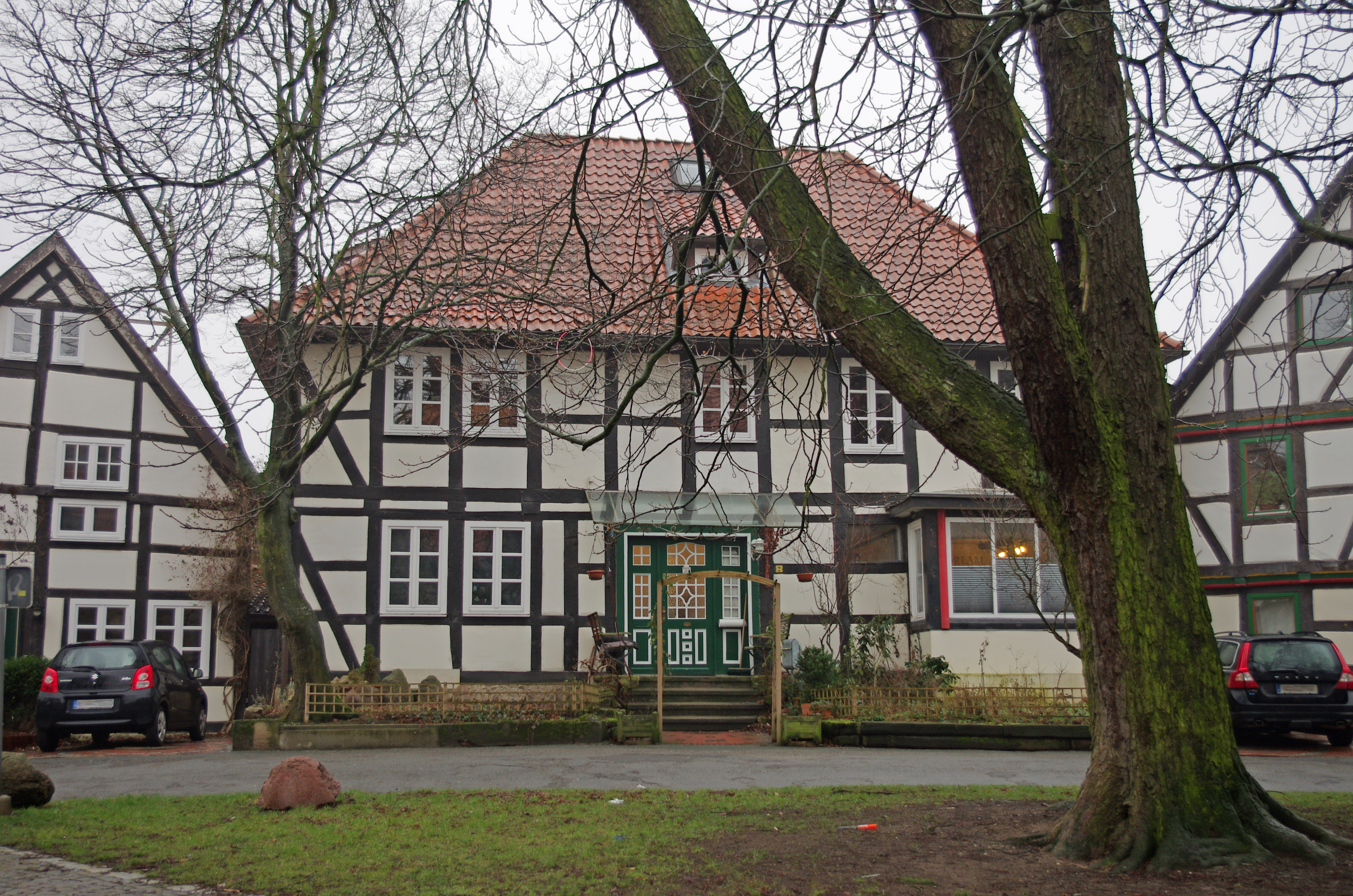
Ronnenberg

== Subdivisions ==
Besides Ronnenberg proper, the city consists of the boroughs of Benthe (including Sieben Trappen), Empelde, Ihme-Roloven, Linderte, Ronnenberg, Vörie, and Weetzen.

== Mayors ==
- 2021–incumbent: Marlo Kratzke (SPD)
- 2014–2021: Stephanie Harms (CDU)
- 2001–2013: Wolfgang Walther (SPD).

== Notable people ==
- Julius Bodenstab (1834–1916), Wisconsin farmer, legislator and real estate broker; a native of Ronnenberg
- Fritz Warnecke (1898–1968), Wehrmacht Generalmajor during World War II; retired to and died in Ronnenberg
- Johannes Weineck (1915–2005), Luftwaffe Hauptmann during World War II; retired to and died in Ronnenberg

== Twin towns – sister cities ==
Ronnenburg-Ihme Roloven is twinned with:

- Rânes, France
