= Town of Milwaukee Town Hall =

- U.S. National Register of Historic Places
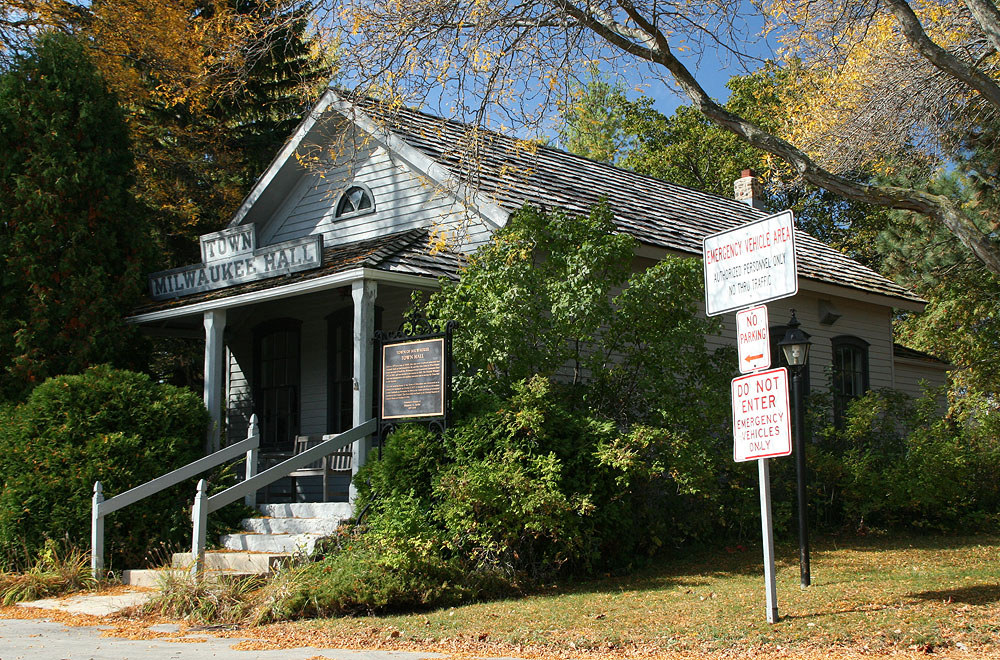
- Town of Milwaukee Town Hall in 2011

- Location within Wisconsin Location within the United States
- Location: 1509 N. Milwaukee River Pkwy. Glendale, Wisconsin
- Coordinates: 43°7′29″N 87°55′45″W
- Area: less than one acre
- Built: 1872
- Architect: Louis Severin
- NRHP reference No.: 86002852
- Added to NRHP: October 9, 1986

The Town of Milwaukee Town Hall was built in 1872 in what is now Glendale, Wisconsin. It was the seat of government of the Town of Milwaukee, Wisconsin until the town ceased to exist after portions of it were annexed into different municipalities. The building was added to the National Register of Historic Places in 1986.

The Town of Milwaukee was formed in 1838, basically the northern half of what is now Milwaukee County, reaching to Greenfield Avenue. It was then largely farmlands, settled by farmers mostly of German, Swiss, French and Dutch origins. In the early years, the town officers met once a year in homes or taverns, but in 1872 the town decided to build its own hall. For $1000, Louis Severin constructed the hall at the corner of what are now Bender Road and Port Washington Road, a fairly simple one-story frame building with a front porch supported by chamfered posts and a lunette window in each gable end.

Over the years the surrounding cities and suburbs annexed bits of the rural Town of Milwaukee until in 1950, the City of Glendale was incorporated out of half of the remainder. With that, the Town dissolved and more of it was annexed by Glendale. By 1962, the town hall was deteriorating and its site on Bender Road was wanted for a water filtration plant. Avoiding demolition, it was moved in 1963 to its current site and restored by the Glendale Women's Club. Today it serves as a museum and occasional meeting room.

The building was moved to a new part of Glendale's city hall property in 2018.
