= Arthur J. Miller =

American politician

Arthur J. Miller was a member of the Wisconsin State Assembly.

== Biography ==
Miller was born on October 27, 1887, in Milwaukee, Wisconsin. He went on to work for companies specializing in the building of bridges and other structures.

== Political career ==
Miller was elected to the Assembly in 1926. Additionally, he was a North Milwaukee, Wisconsin, alderman from 1924 to 1926. He was a Republican.
