= Fred A. Mueller =

American politician

Fred A. Mueller (born November 15, 1868, in North Milwaukee, Wisconsin) was a member of the Wisconsin State Assembly. Mueller was elected to the Assembly in 1924. Additionally, he was Town Clerk of Center, Outagamie County, Wisconsin. He was a Republican.
