= Thomas McCaul =

American politician

Thomas McCaul (January 18, 1838 – October 24, 1926) was an American merchant, contractor, and insurance agent from Tomah, Wisconsin. He served one term as a member of the Wisconsin State Assembly, as well as the first mayor of the newly elevated City of Tomah. During the American Civil War, he was a member of the 1st United States Sharpshooters.

== Background ==
McCaul was born in New York City on January 18, 1838; he received a common school education. He came to Wisconsin with his father and stepmother in 1855; they settled in Fox Lake. He became a farmer and merchant. At the outbreak of the Civil War, he enlisted in the 2nd Wisconsin Volunteer Infantry Regiment but was discharged at Camp Randall "for injuries received" (presumably during training). He re-enlisted in 1861 as a private in Company G of the 1st United States Sharpshooters (better known as Berdan's U. S Sharpshooters}. He participated in several battles, from the Siege of Yorktown (1862) to the Battle of Charles City Crossroads (he was brevetted captain by Governor of Wisconsin Lucius Fairchild "in recognition of gallant and meritorious conduct in rallying retreating troops" at this battle) to the Second Battle of Bull Run. (He also briefly went absent without leave in order to smuggle the body of a fellow Fox Lake soldier back home for burial; then returned to his unit.) At Bull Run, he was wounded in the hip and shoulder, and lost his hearing in the right ear, as a result of which he was discharged from the service in 1863. He became a civilian employee of the Quartermaster Department in Washington, D.C., in 1864, and served at Fort Laramie during Red Cloud's War.

== In Tomah ==
McCaul moved to Tomah in 1868, and held various local offices. In 1873, he was elected to the 2nd Monroe County Assembly district as a member of the Liberal Reform Party (a recently formed coalition of Democrats, reform and Liberal Republicans, and Grangers which secured the election of one Governor of Wisconsin and a number of state legislators) for a one-year term. He received 592 votes, against 513 for Republican Joseph Winship, and 178 for "Independent Republican" John F. Richards; incumbent Republican Adelbert Bleekman was not a candidate. He listed himself in the Wisconsin Blue Book as a "Lib. Republican"; and was assigned to the standing committee on the militia and the joint committee on local legislation. He was not a candidate for re-election, and was succeeded by Republican William W. Jackson.

== After the Assembly ==
In 1883, after Tomah became a city, he was elected its first mayor. He served in that office on several other occasions, and was elected once more in 1906 as the leader of a movement favoring construction of paving and sewers.

He became active in the Democratic Party and represented his county at events such as the state Democratic convention in 1894.

== Death ==
McCaul died on October 24, 1926, and is buried in Oak Grove Cemetery in Tomah.
