= Oscar Morris =

20th century American journalist and politician

President pro tempore of the Wisconsin Senate
- In office January 9, 1929 – January 5, 1931
- Preceded by: William L. Smith
- Succeeded by: Herman J. Severson

Member of the Wisconsin Senate from the 4th district
- In office January 3, 1921 – January 2, 1939
- Preceded by: Herman C. Schultz
- Succeeded by: Milton T. Murray

Personal details
- Born: March 1, 1876 Springfield, Massachusetts, U.S.
- Died: January 2, 1939 (aged 62) Shorewood, Wisconsin, U.S.
- Resting place: Valhalla Memorial Park, Milwaukee
- Party: Republican
- Spouse: Elnore Simmonds
- Children: Dorothy (Parnell); Elnore (Bloom); Mason Morris
- Profession: Journalist

Oscar Haskell Morris (March 8, 1876 – January 2, 1939) was an American journalist and Republican politician from Milwaukee, Wisconsin. He was a member of the Wisconsin Senate for 18 years, representing Wisconsin's 4th Senate district, and was president pro tempore of the Senate during the 1929–1930 session.

== Biography ==
Born in Springfield, Massachusetts, in March 1876, he moved with his parents to Milwaukee, Wisconsin, when he was about two years old. He left school to become a "copy boy" at the Milwaukee Sentinel newspaper. He grew up in the news business, becoming a reporter and sports writer at the Sentinel, and then becoming an editor at the Milwaukee Daily News.

He was elected to five terms in the Wisconsin Senate, running on the Republican Party ticket. He served in the Senate from 1921 until his death in 1939.

He died on January 2, 1939, at his home in Shorewood, Wisconsin after a long period of suffering from heart disease.

Wisconsin Senate
Preceded by Herman C. Schultz	Member of the Wisconsin Senate from the 4th district January 3, 1921 – January 2, 1939	Succeeded by Milton T. Murray
Preceded by William L. Smith	President pro tempore of the Wisconsin Senate; January 9, 1929 – January 5, 1931	Succeeded by Herman J. Severson
