= William Nelson (Wisconsin politician) =

19th century American politician and newspaper publisher

Member of the Wisconsin Senate from the 4th district
- In office January 1, 1872 – January 5, 1874
- Preceded by: Adam Schantz
- Succeeded by: Adelbert Bleekman

Personal details
- Born: July 1, 1839 Rutherglen, Scotland, UK
- Died: October 26, 1913 (aged 74) Salt Lake City, Utah, U.S.
- Cause of death: Stroke
- Resting place: Mount Olivet Cemetery, Salt Lake City
- Party: Republican
- Spouse: Mary Elizabeth Fretwell (m. 1866–1913)
- Children: Margaret Nelson^{(b. 1867; died 1953)}; Mary Nelson^{(b. 1869; died 1938)}; William Nelson^{(b. 1871; died 1910)}; Esther Nelson^{(b. 1875; died 1959)}; Grace Nelson^{(b. 1877; died 1968)}

Military service
- Allegiance: United States
- Branch/service: United States Volunteers; Union Army
- Years of service: 1861–1864
- Rank: 1st Sergeant, USV; Brevet Captain, USV
- Unit: 10th Reg. Wis. Vol. Infantry
- Battles/wars: American Civil War

William Nelson (July 1, 1839 – October 26, 1913) was a Scottish American immigrant, newspaper publisher, and Republican politician. He was a member of the Wisconsin State Senate, representing Vernon and Monroe counties in the 1872 and 1873 sessions, and was later editor of The Salt Lake Tribune, in Salt Lake City, Utah.

== Biography ==
Born in Rutherglen, Scotland, he emigrated to the United States in 1842 with his father and settled in Jamestown, Wisconsin Territory, in 1843. Nelson was an editor and publisher, and started working for the Monroe Sentinel in 1852.

At the outbreak of the American Civil War, he volunteered for service in the Union Army and was enrolled as a private in Company I of the 10th Wisconsin Infantry Regiment. He was promoted to sergeant during the organization of that regiment and was later promoted to first sergeant. He was a member of the regiment through its entire service in the war, which saw several battles in the Kentucky and Tennessee theater. He was captured along with many others of his regiment during the Battle of Chickamauga, and spent seventeen months as a prisoner of war. He was subsequently given an honorary brevet to the rank of captain.

By the time he was released from captivity, his regiment had already been disbanded. He returned to Wisconsin and moved to the village of Viroqua, in Vernon County, where he married Mary Elizabeth Fretwell (1840–1919) in 1866. In 1871, Nelson served as president of the Village of Viroqua. Then, in 1872 and 1873, Nelson served in the Wisconsin State Senate as a Republican. Nelson moved to Utah in 1876. There he first served as a United States marshal, and then joined the staff of The Salt Lake Tribune in 1881. Nelson died of a stroke while serving as editor of The Salt Lake Tribune.

== Electoral history ==
=== Wisconsin Senate (1871) ===
Wisconsin Senate, 4th District Election, 1871
Party	Candidate	Votes	%	±%
General Election, November 7, 1871
Republican	William Nelson	2,835	67.60%	
Independent	T. C. Ankeny	1,359	32.40%	
Plurality		1,476	35.19%	+20.74%
Total votes		4,194	100.0%	+36.52%
Republican gain from Democratic				

Wisconsin Senate
Preceded by Adam Schantz	Member of the Wisconsin Senate from the 4th district January 1, 1872 – January 5, 1874	Succeeded by Adelbert Bleekman
