= Patrick Toland =

19th centuryAmerican politician

Wisconsin Circuit Court Clerk for Washington County
- In office January 1, 1853 – January 1, 1856
- Succeeded by: George H. Kleffler

Member of the Wisconsin State Assembly from the Washington 4th district
- In office January 1, 1849 – January 7, 1850
- Preceded by: Densmore Maxon
- Succeeded by: Edward Divin

Personal details
- Born: 1801 County Tyrone, Ireland, UK
- Died: January 1858 (age 56) Wisconsin, U.S.
- Party: Democratic

Patrick Toland (1801 – January 1858) was an Irish American immigrant, farmer, Democratic politician, and Wisconsin pioneer. He was one of the first settlers in what is now the town of Erin, Wisconsin, and represented that area of Washington County in the Wisconsin State Assembly during the 1849 term; he was also the first sheriff of Washington County, prior to Wisconsin becoming a state. He was a delegate to Wisconsin's first constitutional convention, which produced a constitution that was rejected by voters in 1846. He also served three years as clerk of the circuit court for Washington County in the 1850s.

== Background ==
Toland was born in County Tyrone, Ireland in 1801. He emigrated to North America in about 1830 and lived for some years in Pennsylvania, where he was married. About 1840 he moved to Wisconsin Territory, living for a while in Mequon before buying prairie tracts (to which he moved around 1844) in the southwestern corner of Washington County in an area which became known as Toland's Prairie (sections 29, 30 and 32).

== Public office ==
Toland was Washington County's county clerk for 1844. When its first circuit court met in September 1845, Toland was the county sheriff.

The immediate area where he settled was peopled by many emigrants from Ireland, and the Township was named Erin. It was incorporated in January 1846, and the first town meeting was held at Toland's house in April of that year. When the first Wisconsin constitutional convention was held in 1846, he was a Democratic delegate. He was assigned to the committee on finance, taxation and public debt. A historian of the convention describes Toland as, "highly respected for pleasant demeanor and strong native common sense." He was a county supervisor for Erin for the 1847-48 term

He was elected to the Assembly for the 1849 session of the 2nd Wisconsin Legislature from the 4th Washington County assembly district (the Towns of Erin, Polk and Richfield), succeeding fellow Democrat Densmore Maxon; and would be succeeded in 1850 by Henry Weil, another Democrat. From 1853-56 he would serve as clerk of courts for the County.

== Private life ==
He became a contractor and commissioner for the Fox & Wisconsin Improvement Company, a venture intended to make improvements so that steamboats might pass from Green Bay to the Mississippi River. In 1855, the First Annual Report of the Wisconsin Historical Society reported with delight his donation of a volume of the Pennsylvania Evening Post from August 1776-August 1777.

He died in the spring of 1858.

Wisconsin State Assembly
Preceded by Densmore Maxon	Member of the Wisconsin State Assembly from the Washington 4th district January 1, 1849 – January 7, 1850	Succeeded by Edward Divin
