= William L. Richards =

American politician

William L. Richards (February 7, 1881 – April 10, 1941) was a member of the Wisconsin State Senate.

He was born in Milwaukee, Wisconsin. He graduated from Marquette University and the Milwaukee Law School.

== Career ==
Richards represented the 4th district of the Senate from 1913 to 1916, but was unseated in a five-way Republican primary by challenger Herman C. Schultz and three other candidates. Previously, he was a candidate to be a Milwaukee alderman in 1912. He was a Republican.

Richards died in Milwaukee at the age of 61.
