= Edgar Eno =

American politician

Edgar Eno (born 1841) was a member of the Wisconsin State Assembly.

== Biography ==
Eno was born on September 25, 1841, in Bloomfield, Connecticut. During the American Civil War, he was a member of the 12th Wisconsin Volunteer Infantry Regiment of the Union Army. He would serve during the Vicksburg Campaign, the Atlanta campaign and the Carolinas campaign.

== Political career ==
Eno was a member of the Assembly during the 1874 and 1891 sessions. He was a Republican.
