= John Fletcher Richards =

American politician

John Fletcher Richards was a member of the Wisconsin State Assembly.

== Biography ==
Richards was born on August 4, 1818, in Franklin Township, Clermont County, Ohio. He was a physician.

== Assembly career ==
Richards was a member of the Assembly during the 1872 session. He was a Republican.
