= J. Herbert Green =

American politician

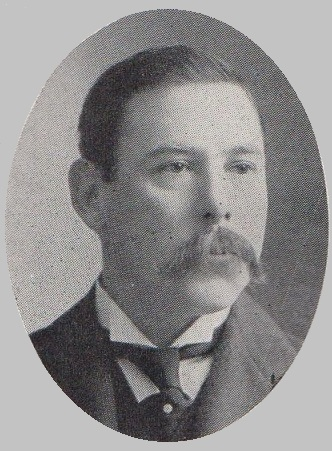

Member of the Wisconsin Senate from the 4th district
- In office 1897–1903

Personal details
- Born: September 7, 1860 Fond du Lac, Wisconsin
- Died: December 4, 1935 (aged 75) Los Angeles, California
- Party: Republican

Joseph Herbert Green (September 7, 1860 – December 4, 1935) was a member of the Wisconsin State Senate.

== Biography ==
Green was born on September 7, 1860, in Fond du Lac, Wisconsin, the son of Joseph Anson Green and Catherine Lowell Green. He was educated in the public schools of Oshkosh, Wisconsin.

He worked as a salesman for a dry goods business in Chicago from 1880 to 1888. He later opened his own retail dry goods business in Milwaukee, which he operated from 1888 to 1897.

Green was a member of the Senate from 1897 to 1903. Additionally, he was a member of the Milwaukee County, Wisconsin Republican Committee.

In 1920, he moved to Los Angeles, where he established himself as a prominent realtor. He died in Los Angeles, aged 75.
