= Joseph Wedig =

American politician

Joseph Wedig (born April 26, 1826 in Hildesheim, Germany), was an American politician. He was a member of the Wisconsin State Assembly. He emigrated to Sheboygan, Wisconsin, USA, in 1849.

== Career ==
Wedig was a member of the Assembly three times, in 1865, from 1867 to 1868, and from 1875 to 1877. He was also an alderman and City Attorney of Sheboygan and a justice of the peace. He was a member of the Reform Party.
