= Henry A. Chase =

American politician

Henry A. Chase was a member of the Wisconsin State Assembly.

== Biography ==
Chase was born on March 18, 1841, in Royalton, Vermont. He graduated from Rush Medical College.

== Assembly career ==
Chase was elected to the Assembly in 1870 and 1871. He was a Republican.
