= John F. Schwalbach =

American politician

John F. Schwalbach, Jr. (February 4, 1845 – September 12, 1915) was an American businessman and politician.

Born in South Germantown, Wisconsin, Schwalbach owned a general and saloon in South Germantown. He was also involved in the banking and insurance business. Schwalbach served as town treasurer. In 1881, Schwalbach served in the Wisconsin State Assembly and was a Democrat. Schwalbach died in a hospital following surgery.
