= Glendale, Wisconsin =

City in Milwaukee County, Wisconsin

- City
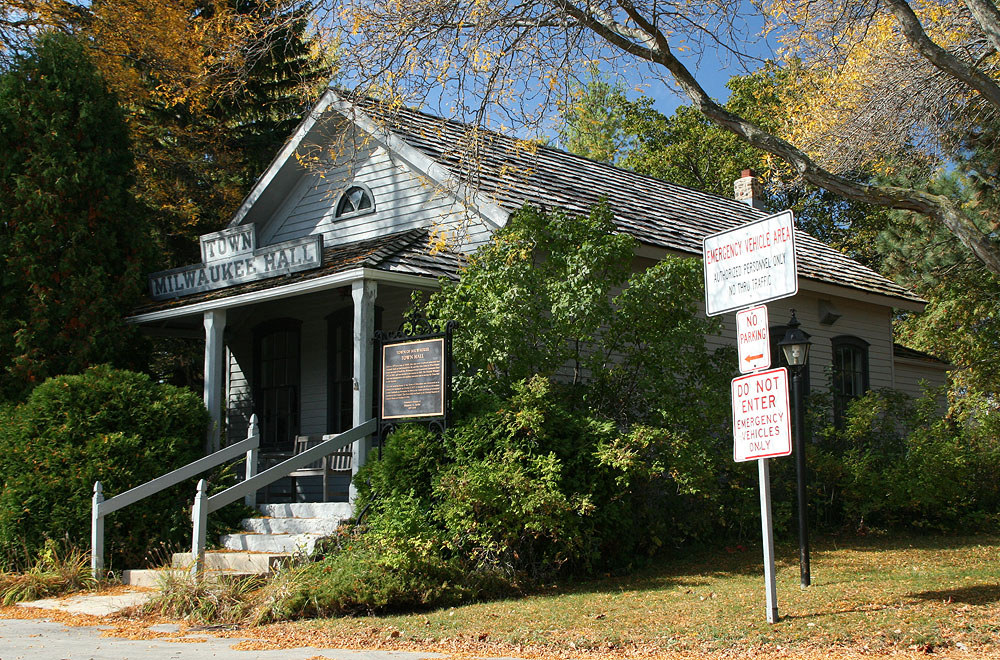
- The Town of Milwaukee Town Hall, built in 1872 and now a museum
- Motto(s): Rich Past, Bright Future
- Interactive map of Glendale, Wisconsin
- Location within Wisconsin Location within the United States
- Coordinates: 43°7′48″N 87°55′40″W
- Country: United States
- State: Wisconsin
- County: Milwaukee
- Incorporated: December 28, 1950; 75 years ago

Area
  - Total: 5.97 sq mi (15.45 km^{2})
  - Land: 5.76 sq mi (14.93 km^{2})
  - Water: 0.20 sq mi (0.52 km^{2})
- Elevation: 653 ft (199 m)

Population (2020)
  - Total: 13,357
  - Density: 2,234/sq mi (862.5/km^{2})
- Time zone: UTC-6 (Central (CST))
  - Summer (DST): UTC-5 (CDT)
- Area code: 414
- FIPS code: 55-29400
- GNIS feature ID: 1565570
- Website: glendalewi.gov

Glendale is a city in Milwaukee County, Wisconsin, United States. The population was 13,357 at the 2020 census. A suburb north of Milwaukee, it is part of the Milwaukee metropolitan area.

== History ==
The Glendale area has been inhabited for thousands of years. The earliest known inhabitants were Woodland period Mound Builders, who constructed earthen effigy and burial mounds in the area. Many of the mounds were destroyed by farmers between 1850 and 1920, though some still exist in Kletzsch Park. In the early 19th century, the land was controlled by Native Americans, including the Menominee, Potawatomi, and Sauk people. The Menominee surrendered the land east of the Milwaukee River to the United States Federal Government through the Treaty of Washington in 1832. In 1833, the Potawatomi surrendered the land west of the river by signing the 1833 Treaty of Chicago, which (after being ratified in 1835) required them to leave Wisconsin by 1838.

The land was organized as part of the Town of Milwaukee in 1838, and the first white settlers were farmers, many of whom were German immigrants. One center of settlement was the Good Hope community, which formed as a stagecoach stop on Green Bay Road in the late 1840s and was a prosperous rural community with a tavern, a school, and a railroad station into the 1890s.

Glendale incorporated as a city on December 28, 1950, from portions of the Town of Milwaukee, including a prosperous industrial corridor along Capitol Drive. It began to develop rapidly in the 1950s, reflecting post-World War II metropolitan growth and migration patterns throughout the United States. Bayshore Town Center (formerly called Bayshore Mall) was established on the eastern border of the city in 1954, and Cardinal Stritch University built a campus straddling the city and the neighboring Village of Fox Point in 1959. In the 1950s, the construction of Interstate 43 further contributed to the city's rapid growth, and the population roughly tripled between 1950 and 1960.

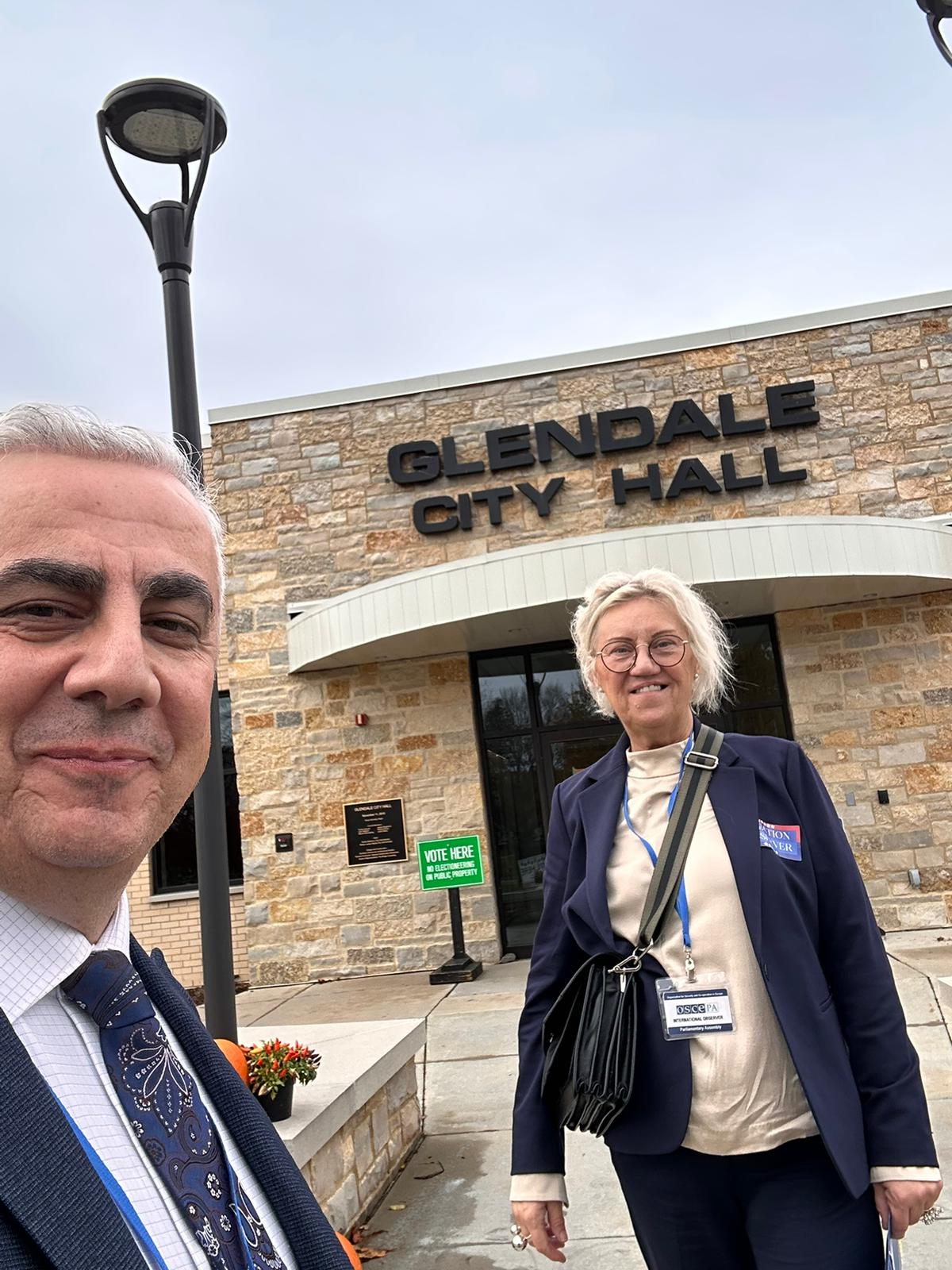
Organization for Security and Co-operation in Europe election observers visiting Glendale, Wisconsin City Hall on 5 November 2024

Unlike other northshore suburbs of Milwaukee, Glendale has a mix of industry and commercial sites in addition to residential areas. The southern areas of the city have mainly industrial and higher density residential sites, while the north features medium to lower density residential plots. Interstate 43 divides the city into east and west sections. Nicolet High School is also located in Glendale and serves the city, along with the suburbs of Fox Point, Bayside, and River Hills. Glendale has begun an ambitious campaign to attract business and population growth. Major roads have undergone massive streetscaping projects, Bayshore Town Center has undergone a multimillion-dollar renovation, and the Glendale Business Park continues to welcome high tech clients. In June 2017, the Richard E. Maslowski Glendale Community Park was opened which includes an amphitheater, playground, veterans memorial, beer garden and community room.

== Geography ==
Glendale is located at 43°7′48″N 87°55′40″W (43.130060, −87.927719).

According to the United States Census Bureau, the city has a total area of 5.97 square miles (15.46 km^{2}), of which 5.76 square miles (14.92 km^{2}) is land and 0.21 square miles (0.54 km^{2}) is water.

== Demographics ==
Historical population
Census	Pop.	Note	%±
1960	9,537		—
1970	13,426		40.8%
1980	13,882		3.4%
1990	14,088		1.5%
2000	13,367		−5.1%
2010	12,872		−3.7%
2020	13,357		3.8%
U.S. Decennial Census

=== 2020 census ===
As of the 2020 census, Glendale had a population of 13,357. The median age was 44.8 years. 18.4% of residents were under the age of 18 and 25.0% of residents were 65 years of age or older. For every 100 females there were 87.2 males, and for every 100 females age 18 and over there were 84.3 males age 18 and over.

100.0% of residents lived in urban areas, while 0.0% lived in rural areas.

There were 6,064 households in Glendale, of which 23.9% had children under the age of 18 living in them. Of all households, 43.8% were married-couple households, 17.5% were households with a male householder and no spouse or partner present, and 32.4% were households with a female householder and no spouse or partner present. About 35.2% of all households were made up of individuals and 17.9% had someone living alone who was 65 years of age or older.

There were 6,462 housing units, of which 6.2% were vacant. The homeowner vacancy rate was 1.3% and the rental vacancy rate was 5.2%.

Racial composition as of the 2020 census
Race	Number	Percent
White	9,304	69.7%
Black or African American	2,370	17.7%
American Indian and Alaska Native	36	0.3%
Asian	520	3.9%
Native Hawaiian and Other Pacific Islander	9	0.1%
Some other race	193	1.4%
Two or more races	925	6.9%
Hispanic or Latino (of any race)	667	5.0%

=== 2010 census ===
As of the census of 2010, there were 12,872 people, 5,815 households, and 3,381 families living in the city. The population density was 2,234.7 inhabitants per square mile (862.8/km^{2}). There were 6,191 housing units at an average density of 1,074.8 per square mile (415.0/km^{2}). The racial makeup of the city was 79.4% White, 14.1% African American, 0.2% Native American, 3.2% Asian, 0.1% Pacific Islander, 0.7% from other races, and 2.3% from two or more races. Hispanic or Latino of any race were 3.6% of the population.

There were 5,815 households, of which 23.3% had children under the age of 18 living with them, 46.1% were married couples living together, 9.2% had a female householder with no husband present, 2.8% had a male householder with no wife present, and 41.9% were non-families. 35.6% of all households were made up of individuals, and 16.6% had someone living alone who was 65 years of age or older. The average household size was 2.14 and the average family size was 2.80.

The median age in the city was 46.8 years. 18.7% of residents were under the age of 18; 6.9% were between the ages of 18 and 24; 22.2% were from 25 to 44; 29.8% were from 45 to 64; and 22.6% were 65 years of age or older. The gender makeup of the city was 46.4% male and 53.6% female.

=== 2000 census ===
As of the census of 2000, there were 13,367 people, 5,772 households, and 3,515 families living in the city. The population density was 2,307.4 people per square mile (891.4/km^{2}). There were 5,974 housing units at an average density of 1,031.2 per square mile (398.4/km^{2}). The racial makeup of the city was 86.76% White, 8.13% African American, 0.23% Native American, 2.96% Asian, 0.10% Pacific Islander, 0.49% from other races, and 1.33% from two or more races. Hispanic or Latino of any race were 1.77% of the population.

There were 5,772 households, out of which 24.3% had children under the age of 18 living with them, 50.0% were married couples living together, 8.2% had a female householder with no husband present, and 39.1% were non-families. 33.6% of all households were made up of individuals, and 16.2% had someone living alone who was 65 years of age or older. The average household size was 2.20 and the average family size was 2.84.

In the city, the population was spread out, with 19.4% under the age of 18, 5.4% from 18 to 24, 24.2% from 25 to 44, 26.3% from 45 to 64, and 24.8% who were 65 years of age or older. The median age was 46 years. For every 100 females, there were 86.7 males. For every 100 females age 18 and over, there were 82.4 males.

The median income for a household in the city was $55,306, and the median income for a family was $68,429. Males had a median income of $45,670 versus $36,334 for females. The per capita income for the city was $30,328. About 2.6% of families and 4.0% of the population were below the poverty line, including 3.2% of those under age 18 and 6.3% of those age 65 or over.

== Economy ==
- Bayshore (shopping mall)
- Florsheim Shoes
- Johnson Controls
- Sprecher Brewery
- Kopps Frozen Custard

== Education ==
The Glendale-River Hills School District is the elementary school district. All parts of Glendale are in the Nicolet Union High School District. Glen Hills Middle School is the middle school of the Glen Mills district, while Nicolet High School is of the Nicolet district.

Post-secondary:

- Columbia College of Nursing
