= James C. Officer =

American politician

James C. Officer (1859–1910) was a member of the Wisconsin State Senate.

== Biography ==
Officer was born on January 23, 1859, in Vernon County, Wisconsin, as the oldest child of Mary Ann Spencer and Elias Crumbaker Officer. He graduated from the University of Wisconsin-Madison in 1884 and the University of Wisconsin Law School in 1886. Officer died at the age of 50 on January 1, 1910, and is interred in Springville, Wisconsin.

== Career ==
Officer was elected to the Senate in 1894. He was a Republican.
