= George W. Swain =

American politician (1824–1904)

George W. Swain (March 5, 1824 – June 17, 1904) was a member of the Wisconsin State Senate.

== Biography ==
Born in Sanbornton, New Hampshire, Swain moved to Bristol, Dane County, Wisconsin in 1853.

Swain married Hannah Chase (1825–1895) in 1849. They had four children.

== Career ==
Swain was the founder of Chaseburg, Wisconsin, having platted the town in 1863. He was its treasurer in 1866, and supervisor of Vernon County, Wisconsin in 1870. Swain represented the 4th district of the Senate from 1878 to 1879. He was a Republican.

In the mid 1880s, Swain moved to Ashton, South Dakota, where he remained until his death from heart failure at the age of 80.
