= North Milwaukee, Wisconsin =

Coordinates: 43°06′43″N 87°57′23″W

North Milwaukee (originally Schwartzburg and later briefly Northern Junction) was a village in northern Milwaukee County, Wisconsin, United States.

== History ==
The original Schwartzburg was a hamlet centered on a large farm settled by one Christian Schwartzburg on land bought from Byron Kilbourn, and was named after the settlement's most prominent citizen. In the 1850s Schwartzburg began to sell some of his land holding to others, and a railroad depot was established in the area.

Expansion was fuelled by real estate developer and streetcar magnate Henry Clay Payne, and the village (now renamed North Milwaukee) was incorporated in 1897 and merged with the City of Milwaukee on January 1, 1929.

The village (later to become a city) covered an area from Congress Street to Silver Spring Drive between 27th Street and Sherman Boulevard. The main street was Villard Avenue, but the village had the economic advantages of a Milwaukee Road railroad crossing near 35th and Hampton, supplemented by a streetcar line which Payne (local manager of The Milwaukee Electric Railway and Light Company) had run across two miles of vacant fields to the new community. The population was heavily German Americans, including a large population of Volga Deutsche in the neighborhood called "Red Town".

The records of the village are in the Archives of the City of Milwaukee. The name "Old North Milwaukee" survives to some extent as a neighborhood name roughly coterminous with the village boundaries.

== Notable people ==
- Fred C. Maertz, businessman and politician, ran a movie theater business in North Milwaukee in his later years
- Arthur J. Miller, businessman and politician, served as a North Milwaukee alderman
- Fred A. Mueller, farmer and local politician, born in North Milwaukee, served one term in the state legislature
