= Meeker, Wisconsin =

- former hamlet
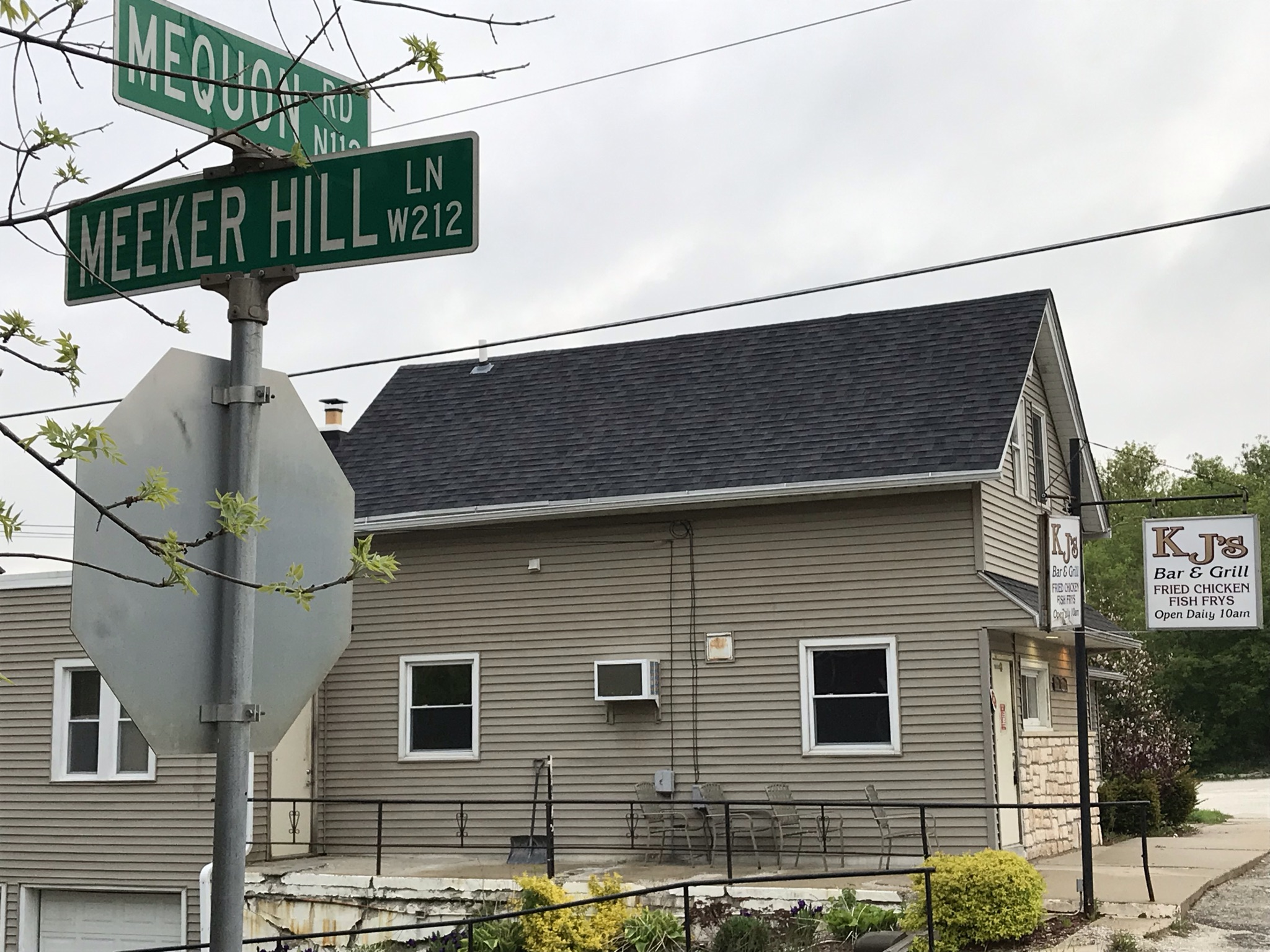

- Location within Wisconsin
- Coordinates: 43°13′18″N 88°10′23″W
- Country: United States
- State: Wisconsin
- County: Washington

Meeker was a hamlet in Washington County, Wisconsin, United States. The area is now part of the Village of Germantown, at latitude 43.2217 and longitude -88.1731, centered on what is now the intersection of Mequon Road and Meeker Hill Lane.

== Notable people ==
- Baltus Mantz, Wisconsin State Senator, lived in Meeker.
