= John C. McBride =

American politician (1908–1979)

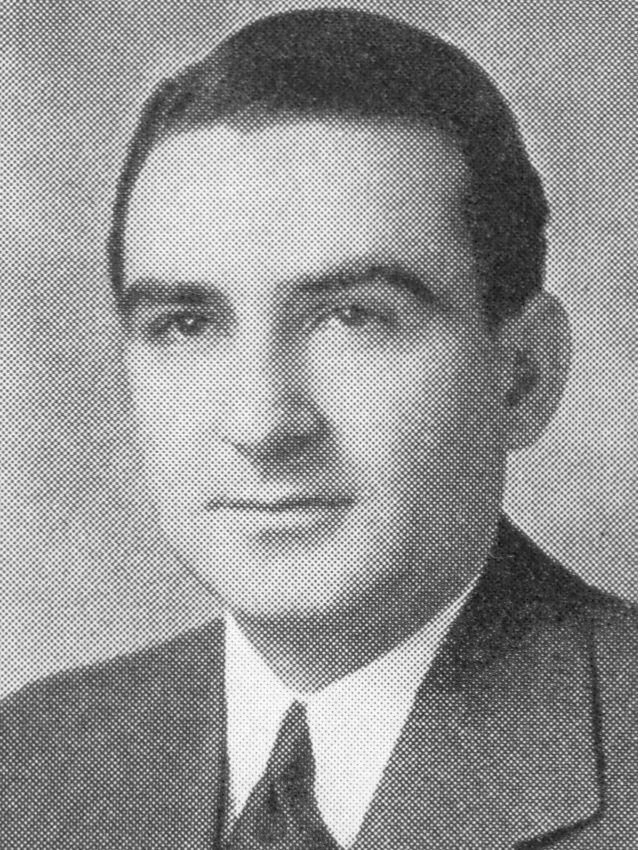
McBride circa 1940

John C. McBride (September 16, 1908 – July 20, 1979) was an American politician who served as a member of the Wisconsin State Assembly and the Wisconsin Senate.

== Biography ==
McBride was born on September 16, 1908, in Milwaukee, Wisconsin. McBride went to Marquette University and received his law degree from University of Wisconsin Law School. He would become a lawyer. McBride served as a United Magistrate. He died of a heart attack on July 20, 1979, at his house in Milwaukee.

== Political career ==
McBride was a member of the Assembly from 1939 to 1944 and of the Senate from 1945 to 1948. He was a Republican.
