= Milwaukee (town), Wisconsin =

Former community in Milwaukee County, Wisconsin

Coordinates: 43°06′N 87°55′W

The Town of Milwaukee was a town in Milwaukee County, Wisconsin, United States, created on March 17, 1835. A number of Milwaukee County municipalities, beginning with the City of Milwaukee, were created out of portions of it. After the last portions of the town were annexed, it officially ceased to exist in 1955.

== Geography ==
The Town of Milwaukee was originally co-terminous with Milwaukee County itself. In 1838, the territorial legislature divided the County into two townships: Milwaukee, encompassing everything north of the present Greenfield Avenue, and the Town of Lake encompassing everything South of the present Greenfield Avenue.

After 1840, using modern-day reference points, the Town of Milwaukee reached from Greenfield Avenue in the south to County Line Road on the north, Lake Michigan on the east and 27th Street on the west. Its neighbors were the Town of Wauwatosa and the Town of Granville to the west, the Town of Lake to the south and the Town of Mequon to the north.

The Town of Milwaukee Town Hall, built in 1872, is located in present-day Glendale.

== Municipalities formerly a part of the Town of Milwaukee ==
- Village of Milwaukee, 1838. Later became the City of Milwaukee in 1846.
- Town of Granville, January 13, 1840
- Town of Wauwatosa (originally Wau-wau-toh-sa), April 30, 1840
- Whitefish Bay, 1892
- East Milwaukee, August 1900 (Name changed to Shorewood in 1917)
- Fox Point, 1926
- River Hills, March 17, 1930
- Glendale, 1950
- Bayside, February 13, 1953

== Notable people ==
- Henry Fowler, farmer and legislator, was a member of the town board of supervisors.
- Charles A. W. Krauss, businessman and legislator was born in the town; Krauss served on the Milwaukee Town Board.
- Peter F. Leuch, lawyer and legislator, was born in the town.
- Frederick Moskowitt, farmer and legislator, lived in the town.
- William S. Harley, engineer and businessman, co-founder of the Harley-Davidson Motor Company.
