= Baltus Mantz =

American politician (1815–1854)

Baltus (Balthus) Mantz (January 29, 1815 – August 9, 1854) was an American politician.

Mantz was a farmer, from Meeker, Wisconsin. He was born in Germany in 1815 and immigrated to the United States in 1837. Mantz served as register of deeds for Washington County, Wisconsin and in town government. He then served in the Wisconsin State Senate, in 1854, from Washington County, Wisconsin. He backed a plan to drain the lakes at Muskego, Wisconsin.

Mantz died of cholera on August 8 (Note: The Sauk County Standard of August 9, 1854 states "We were informed last evening of the death of Mr. Baltus Mantz," indicating that his death occurred before August 9.) or August 9, 1854 while still in office.
