= Harry F. Franke Jr. =

American politician (1922–2012)

Harry Franke Jr.

Member of the Wisconsin Senate
- In office 1953–1956
- In office 1950–1953

Personal details
- Born: October 13, 1922 Milwaukee, Wisconsin
- Died: February 4, 2012 (aged 89) Mequon, Wisconsin
- Party: Republican
- Education: University of Wisconsin-Madison
- Occupation: State Representative

Harry F. Franke Jr. (1922–2012) was a politician in Wisconsin.

== Biography ==
Franke was born on October 13, 1922, in Milwaukee, Wisconsin. During World War II, he served with the United States Army. Franke received his bachelor's degree from Marquette University and his law degree from University of Wisconsin–Madison. After his legislative service, he practiced law and was a lobbyist. He died on February 4, 2012, in Mequon, Wisconsin.

== Political career ==
Franke was a member of the Wisconsin State Senate from 1953 to 1956. Previously, he was elected to the Wisconsin State Assembly in 1950. He was a Republican.
