= List of people from Kenosha, Wisconsin =

The people listed below were all born in, residents of, or otherwise closely associated with Kenosha, Wisconsin.

== Artists, authors ==
- William Bast, screenwriter
- Chester Biscardi, composer, director of musical arts at Yale University
- Lucien Cailliet, composer, conductor, film orchestrator (The Ten Commandments)
- Jeff Cesario, comedian, TV writer
- Donald Clarke, author of books on musical subjects
- Korey Cooper, backup vocalist, keyboardist, rhythm guitarist for Skillet
- Anna Fermin, musician
- Tom Goss, musician
- Lionel Hampton, vibraphonist and bandleader
- Florence Parry Heide, author
- Milt Herth, organist
- Margaret Landon, author of Anna and the King of Siam (The King and I)
- Jen Ledger, drummer/singer for Skillet
- Dave Matrise, singer, guitarist for Jungle Rot
- Lloyd John Ogilvie, Presbyterian minister and writer; served as chaplain of the United States Senate
- Milton K. Ozaki, author and detective novelist
- Gus Polinski, musician, clarinet player, and leader of the Kenosha Kickers
- George Pollard, portrait painter
- Thom Racina, author and screenwriter (General Hospital)
- Spike Robinson, jazz saxophonist
- Jim Rygiel, triple Academy Award winner (Lord of the Rings)
- Mary Sauer, principal pianist for the Chicago Symphony Orchestra since 1959; on the piano faculty of DePaul University for 33 years, where she was coordinator of the keyboard program
- Will Schaefer, composer
- Edwin Stringham, composer, educator
- Kathie Sullivan, vocalist (The Lawrence Welk Show)
- Irving Wallace, author (The Chapman Report)

== Actors/actresses, directors ==
- Don Ameche, actor, Academy Award-winner (Cocoon, Trading Places)
- Jim Ameche, actor (Jack Armstrong, the All-American Boy)
- Thom Bierdz, actor (The Young and the Restless)
- Francesco Bilotto, television personality (Good Morning America, The View, Today)
- Edward F. Cline, film director (The Bank Dick, You Can't Cheat an Honest Man)
- Bert I. Gordon, film director (The Food of the Gods)
- Al Molinaro, actor (Happy Days, The Odd Couple)
- Mark Ruffalo, actor (The Avengers, Avengers: Infinity War, Now You See Me, Shutter Island, Zodiac)
- Tony Russel, film and stage actor (Hearts Are Wild)
- Rebecca Scott, model and actress, Miss August 1999 for Playboy
- Charles Siebert, actor (Trapper John, M.D.), director (Xena: Warrior Princess)
- Paul Sorensen, actor (Dance With Me, Henry)
- John Stephenson, voice actor (The Flintstones)
- Concetta Tomei, actress (China Beach)
- Daniel J. Travanti, actor (Hill Street Blues)
- Orson Welles, producer, actor, writer, director (Citizen Kane, The Magnificent Ambersons, Touch of Evil, F for Fake)

== Politics and law ==
- Joseph F. Andrea, Wisconsin legislator
- John Martin Antaramian, Wisconsin legislator, former mayor of Kenosha
- Peter W. Barca, U.S. representative and Wisconsin legislator
- Chauncey Davis, Michigan legislator
- C. Ernest Dewey, Wisconsin legislator
- Eugene Dorff, Wisconsin legislator and former Kenosha mayor
- Charles Durkee, U.S. senator
- Asahel Farr, 6th, 10th, 17th, and 21st mayor of Kenosha, Wisconsin legislator
- Malcolm D. Farr, Wisconsin legislator
- Margaret Farrow, 42nd lieutenant governor of Wisconsin, University of Wisconsin Board of Regents
- Michael Frank, 1st mayor of Kenosha, Wisconsin legislator
- Myron L. Gordon, Wisconsin Supreme Court
- Levi Grant, Wisconsin legislator
- Orson S. Head, Wisconsin legislator and lawyer
- Daniel Hugunin Jr., U.S. representative from New York
- Bob Kiss, mayor of Burlington, Vermont
- Joseph Lourigan, Wisconsin legislator
- Frederick S. Lovell, 11th speaker of the Wisconsin State Assembly, Union Army general
- Silas Matteson, Wisconsin legislator
- John J. Maurer, Wisconsin legislator
- John G. McMynn, 7th Wisconsin superintendent of Public Instruction
- George Molinaro, Wisconsin legislator
- Earl D. Morton, Wisconsin legislator and jurist
- George Howard Paul, 5th mayor of Kenosha, Wisconsin legislator, journalist
- Milton Pettit, 11th lieutenant governor of Wisconsin, 8th, 11th, 13th, and 16th mayor of Kenosha
- Charles H. Pfennig, Wisconsin legislator
- Mark Pocan, U.S. representative for Wisconsin
- Lewis W. Powell, Wisconsin legislator and lawyer
- Reince Priebus, former chairman of the Republican National Committee, former White House Chief of Staff
- Michael Pucci, Australian politician
- Joseph V. Quarles, U.S. senator, U.S. District Judge, and former Kenosha mayor
- Clifford E. Randall, U.S. representative
- Robert Schmidt, Wisconsin legislator
- Mathias J. Scholey, former Kenosha mayor
- Conrad Shearer, Wisconsin legislator
- Charles C. Sholes, former Kenosha mayor
- Rouse Simmons, Wisconsin legislator and businessman
- Zalmon G. Simmons, Wisconsin legislator, former Kenosha mayor, and businessman
- William H. Stevenson, U.S. representative

== Sports ==
- Milo Allison, MLB player
- Alan Ameche, Wisconsin Badgers and NFL football player, 1954 Heisman Trophy winner
- Donna Becker, All-American Girls Professional Baseball League ballplayer
- Ray Berres, MLB player, longtime Chicago White Sox pitching coach
- Tom Bienemann, NFL player
- John Bocwinski, soccer player and 1972 Olympian
- Fred Borak, NFL player
- Dick Bosman, MLB pitcher and pitching coach
- Tom Braatz, NFL player and general manager
- David Cabán, soccer player
- Jeff Cohen, All-American basketball player at The College of William & Mary in 1960–61
- Frankie Conley, boxer
- Ed Corey, MLB player
- Fritz Cronin, NFL player
- Press Cruthers, MLB player
- Kate Del Fava, NWSL player
- Ben Dyer, MLB player
- Gene Englund, NBL, NBA basketball player, captain of University of Wisconsin's 1941 national championship team
- Barbara Galdonik, AAGPBL ballplayer
- Melvin Gordon, NFL player
- Harvey Green, MLB player
- Jack Hammond, MLB player
- Bob Hartman, MLB player
- Joyce Hill, All-American Girls Professional Baseball League player
- Ken Huxhold, NFL player
- Chuck Jaskwhich, head coach of the Ole Miss Rebels men's basketball team
- Tristan Jass, basketball player and social media influencer
- Chet Kozel, professional football player
- Gavin Lux, infielder for Cincinnati Reds
- Walter Maurer, Olympic wrestling medalist
- Marie Menheer, All-American Girls Professional Baseball League player
- Darlene Mickelsen, All-American Girls Professional Baseball League player
- Ollie O'Mara, MLB player
- Megan Oster, figure skater
- Charlie Pechous, MLB player
- Phil Pettey, NFL player
- Tom Regner, Notre Dame All-American offensive guard and 1966 Houston Oilers NFL Champion Team
- Elmer Rhenstrom, NFL player
- Ben Rothwell, professional mixed martial artist
- Paul Russo, auto racer
- Augie Schmidt, baseball player and coach
- Ray Spalding, NBA player
- Ralph Thomas, NFL player
- Nick Van Exel, NBA player and currently an assistant coach for the Atlanta Hawks
- James "Hippo" Vaughn, Chicago Cubs pitcher
- Trae Waynes, NFL player

== Other ==
- Edward E. Ayer (1841–1927), railway supplies magnate; manuscript collector; benefactor to Newberry Library and Field Museum of Natural History
- Mary D. Bradford, educator, first female superintendent of a major school system in Wisconsin
- Bill Brown (1855–1941), Oregon rancher
- T. Charles Gaastra (1879–1947), Netherlands-born architect who practiced in Kenosha, Chicago, and New Mexico.
- Jerry Golden, ABC reporter who was first with the John F. Kennedy assassination news
- Linda Ham, manager of the Johnson Space Center
- Michael P. Hammond, chairman, National Endowment for the Arts
- Jim Jensen, CBS news anchor and reporter
- Raymond Edward Johnson, radio actor, host of Inner Sanctum
- Samuel C. Johnson, Sr., founder, Johnson Wax
- Edward S. "Ned" Jordan, automaker (Jordan Motor Car Company), columnist ("Ned Jordan Speaks," AutoWeek) and ad writer ("Somewhere west of Laramie")
- Laura Kaeppeler, Miss Wisconsin 2011 and Miss America 2012
- Theodore H. Laban, highly decorated U.S. Army Air Forces soldier
- Lola J. May, mathematics educator
- Robert Bruce McCoy, United States National Guard officer
- Joseph E. Meyer, herbologist and founder of the Indiana Botanic Gardens
- Charles W. Nash, automaker, Nash Motors, Nash-Kelvinator
- Edward T. Newell, president of the American Numismatic Society 1916–1941
- Norm Nielsen, magician and businessman
- James R. O'Neill, American Civil War correspondent and sketch artist
- Michael Phillips, theater critic, Pulitzer Prize jurist
- Peter Pirsch, builder of fire equipment
- Charles Wallace Richmond (1868–1932), ornithologist.
- Luther B. Scherer, also known as Tutor Scherer (1879–1957), investor in casinos in Las Vegas, Nevada and poet laureate of Nevada
- Kendra Scott, jeweler
- Christopher Latham Sholes, publisher, inventor of the QWERTY keyboard
- Zalmon Gilbert Simmons II, businessman
- Charles Symmonds, U.S. Army general
- George Nelson Tremper, educator
- Paul Weyrich, co-founder of The Heritage Foundation and Free Congress Foundation and member of National Surface Transportation Policy and Revenue Study Commission
- Joseph Zimmermann, inventor of the answering machine

== See also ==
- List of mayors of Kenosha, Wisconsin
