= Green Ridge Cemetery (Kenosha, Wisconsin) =

Cemetery in Kenosha, Wisconsin

- Interactive map of Green Ridge Cemetery

Details
- Established: 1838
- Location: 6604 7th Ave, Kenosha, Wisconsin
- Country: US
- Coordinates: 42.57220°N 87.81970°W
- Size: 48 acres (19 ha)
- No. of interments: >30,000
- Find a Grave: Green Ridge Cemetery

Green Ridge Cemetery is a 48-acre burial site located in Kenosha, Wisconsin. Previously known as Kenosha City Cemetery, the earliest burials took place in 1836, including some of Kenosha's earliest American settlers. The land was originally part of the estate of Charles Durkee; his wife, Catherine, was one of the first burials at the site, and he donated the land to establish the cemetery in 1838. The cemetery is now the final resting place for over 30,000 people, including many of the most prominent citizens from the history of Kenosha.

== Notable interments ==
- Mary D. Bradford (1856–1943), first woman school superintendent in Wisconsin.
- John Bullen Jr. (1803–1884), co-founder of Kenosha.
- William Bullen (1805–1846), co-founder of Kenosha.
- Eugene Dorff (1930–2005), state representative, interim mayor of Kenosha (1987).
- Charles Durkee (1805–1870), U.S. representative, U.S. senator, and 6th governor of Utah Territory.
- Asahel Farr (1820–1887), 6th, 10th, 17th, & 21st mayor of Kenosha, state senator.
- Michael Frank (1804–1894), first mayor of Kenosha, considered the father of Wisconsin's public schools.
- John Fraser (1827–1878), president of Pennsylvania State University, Union Army general.
- Daniel Hugunin Jr. (1790–1850), U.S. representative, U.S. marshal.
- Samuel Curtis Johnson Sr. (1833–1919), founder of S. C. Johnson & Son.
- Frederick S. Lovell, (1813–1878), 11th speaker of the Wisconsin State Assembly.
- George Howard Paul (1826–1890), 5th mayor of Kenosha, state senator.
- Milton Pettit (1835–1873), 11th lieutenant governor of Wisconsin, 8th, 11th, 13th, & 16th mayor of Kenosha.
- Charles H. Pfennig (1871–1955), 36th & 41st mayor of Kenosha, Kenosha County sheriff.
- Joseph V. Quarles Jr. (1843–1911), U.S. senator, U.S. district judge, founder of Quarles & Brady, 20th mayor of Kenosha.
- Clifford E. Randall (1876–1934), U.S. representative.
- Frederick Robinson (1824–1893), 9th, 15th, & 22nd mayor of Kenosha.
- Charles Sholes (1816–1867), 3rd mayor of Kenosha, 8th speaker of the Wisconsin State Assembly.
- Zalmon G. Simmons (1828–1910), Kenosha pioneer, 26th mayor, founder of Simmons Bedding Company.
- Anthony Van Wyck (1822–1900), state senator.
- Beatrice Ives Welles (1881–1924), pianist and mother of Orson Welles
