= Wisconsin's Kenosha County Assembly district =

Former American legislative district

Wisconsin's Kenosha County State Assembly district
- Obsolete
- Notes: 1861–1922

Wisconsin's Kenosha County Assembly district was a district in the Wisconsin State Assembly for part of the history of the state of Wisconsin, prior to the legislative redistricting reforms of 1972 which created the current numbered districts. Located in southeast Wisconsin, the district comprised the whole of Kenosha County, Wisconsin.

The district was in use for elections from 1861 to 1920.

== List of representatives ==
List of representatives from the Kenosha County district
Member	Party	Residence	Term start	Term end	Leg.
District created
Reuben L. Bassett	Union	Wilmot	January 6, 1862	January 1, 1863	15th
Benjamin T. Hatch	Rep.	Kenosha	January 1, 1863	January 4, 1864	16th
A. Constantine Barry	Union	Sylvania	January 4, 1864	January 2, 1865	17th
Zalmon G. Simmons	Union	Kenosha	January 2, 1865	January 1, 1866	18th
Franklin Newell	Union	Kenosha	January 1, 1866	January 7, 1867	19th
Gideon Truesdell	Union	Kenosha	January 7, 1867	January 6, 1868	20th
Jacob B. Shibley	Rep.	Bassett	January 6, 1868	January 4, 1869	21st
Samuel E. Tarbell	Rep.	Woodworth	January 4, 1869	January 3, 1870	22nd
Alexander Bailey	Rep.	Salem	January 3, 1870	January 2, 1871	23rd
Jonas W. Rhodes	Ind.	Somers	January 2, 1871	January 1, 1872	24th
Frederick Robinson	Dem.	Kenosha	January 1, 1872	January 6, 1873	25th
Asahel Farr	Rep.	Kenosha	January 6, 1873	January 5, 1874	26th
Robert S. Houston	Ref.	Pleasant Prairie	January 5, 1874	January 4, 1875	27th
Rouse Simmons	Rep.	Kenosha	January 4, 1875	January 3, 1876	28th
Frederick Robinson	Dem.	Kenosha	January 3, 1876	January 1, 1877	29th
Walter Maxwell	Rep.	Somers	January 1, 1877	January 7, 1878	30th
Walter L. Dexter	Dem.	Pleasant Prairie	January 7, 1878	January 6, 1879	31st
Joseph V. Quarles	Rep.	Kenosha	January 6, 1879	January 5, 1880	32nd
Cornelius Williams	Rep.	Bristol	January 5, 1880	January 3, 1881	33rd
Walter Maxwell	Rep.	Somers	January 3, 1881	January 2, 1882	34th
John B. Vosburgh	Rep.	Randall	January 2, 1882	January 1, 1883	35th
Walter Maxwell	Rep.	Somers	January 1, 1883	January 5, 1885	36th
Andrew Patterson	Rep.	Salem	January 5, 1885	January 3, 1887	37th
John G. Fleming	Dem.	Randall	January 3, 1887	January 7, 1889	38th
Dwight L. Burgess	Rep.	Salem	January 7, 1889	January 5, 1891	39th
Robert S. Houston	Dem.	Pleasant Prairie	January 5, 1891	January 2, 1893	40th
Daniel A. Mahoney	Dem.	Kenosha	January 2, 1893	January 27, 1893	41st
--Vacant--			January 27, 1893	February 21, 1893	41st
George H. Kroncke	Dem.	Randall	February 21, 1893	January 7, 1895	41st
John F. Reynolds	Rep.	Randall	January 7, 1895	January 2, 1899	42nd 43rd
S. Dwight Slade	Rep.	Wheatland	January 2, 1899	January 2, 1905	44th 45th 46th
Walker M. Curtiss	Rep.	Salem	January 2, 1905	January 2, 1911	47th 48th 49th
Mathias J. Scholey	Dem.	Kenosha	January 2, 1911	January 6, 1913	50th
Charles H. Pfennig	Rep.	Kenosha	January 6, 1913	January 4, 1915	51st
Edward J. Vincent	Rep.	Silver Lake	January 4, 1915	January 6, 1919	52nd 53rd
Peter M. Anderson	Rep.	Somers	January 6, 1919	January 3, 1921	54th
Malcolm D. Farr	Rep.	Kenosha	January 3, 1921	January 1, 1923	55th
District abolished by 1921 Wisconsin Act 470; Kenosha County re-divided into the Kenosha 1st and Kenosha 2nd districts
