= List of mayors of Kenosha, Wisconsin =

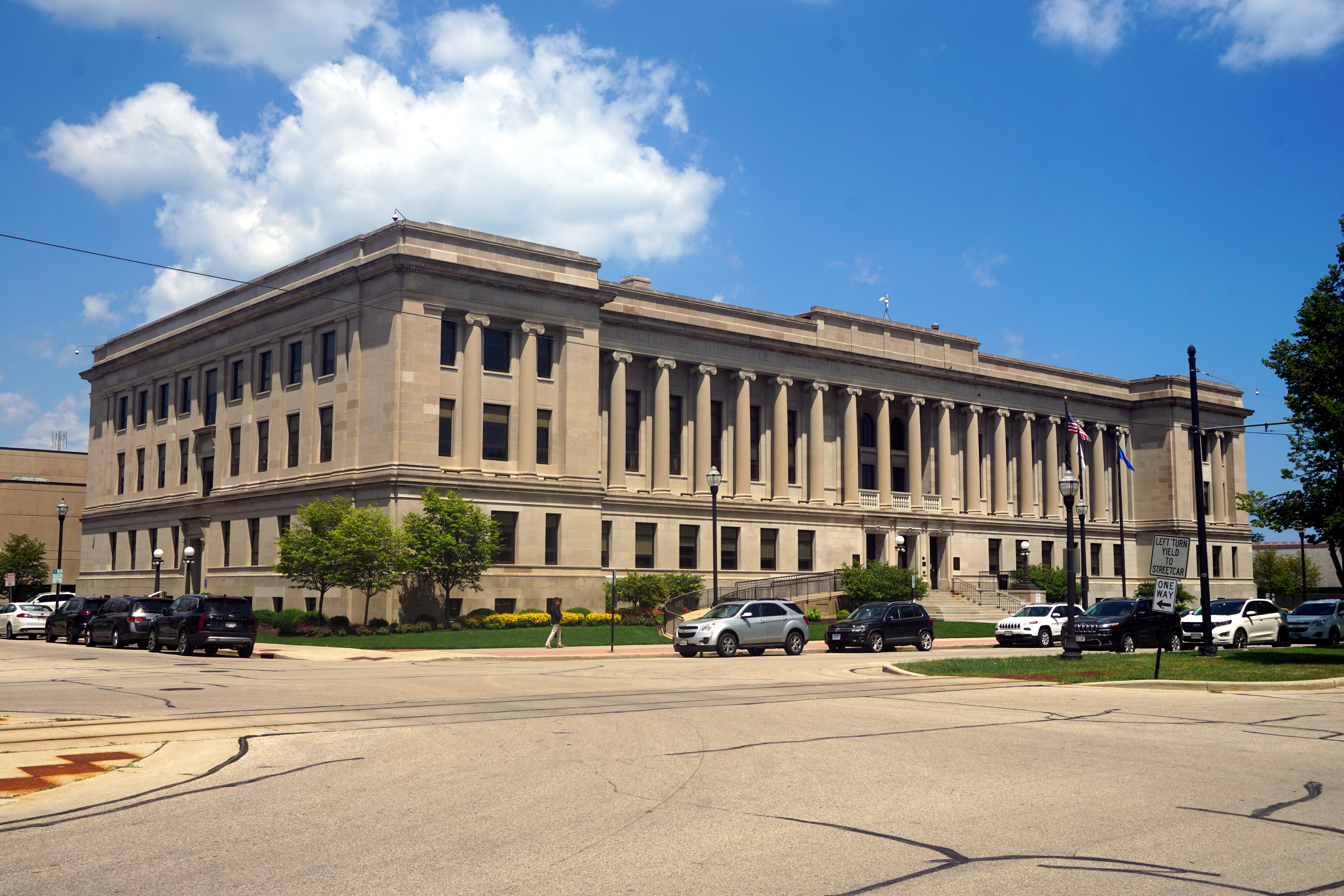
Kenosha County Courthouse

This is a list of mayors of Kenosha, Wisconsin, USA. Kenosha was originally incorporated as the village of Southport in 1841, before Wisconsin statehood. In 1850, the village of Southport was replaced by the incorporation of the city of Kenosha. For most of its history, Kenosha utilized a mayor–council government, but experimented with a council–manager government from 1922 to 1958. Kenosha's mayors were initially elected to one-year terms, like most other local officials in early Wisconsin. Today Kenosha mayors are elected to four-year terms.

The first mayor of Kenosha was Michael Frank, a pioneer educator who is considered the father of Wisconsin public schools. The current mayor is David Bogdala, who previously served 16 years on the city council. Kenosha's longest-serving mayor is John Antaramian, from 1992 to 2008, and from 2016 to 2024. The most notable mayors were Joseph V. Quarles, who went on to become a U.S. senator and a U.S. district judge, and Zalmon G. Simmons, who founded the Simmons Company and is the namesake of several Kenosha institutions, such as Simmons Island.

== Village presidents (1841–1850) ==
The Village of Southport was incorporated by an act of the 3rd Wisconsin Territorial Assembly in 1841.

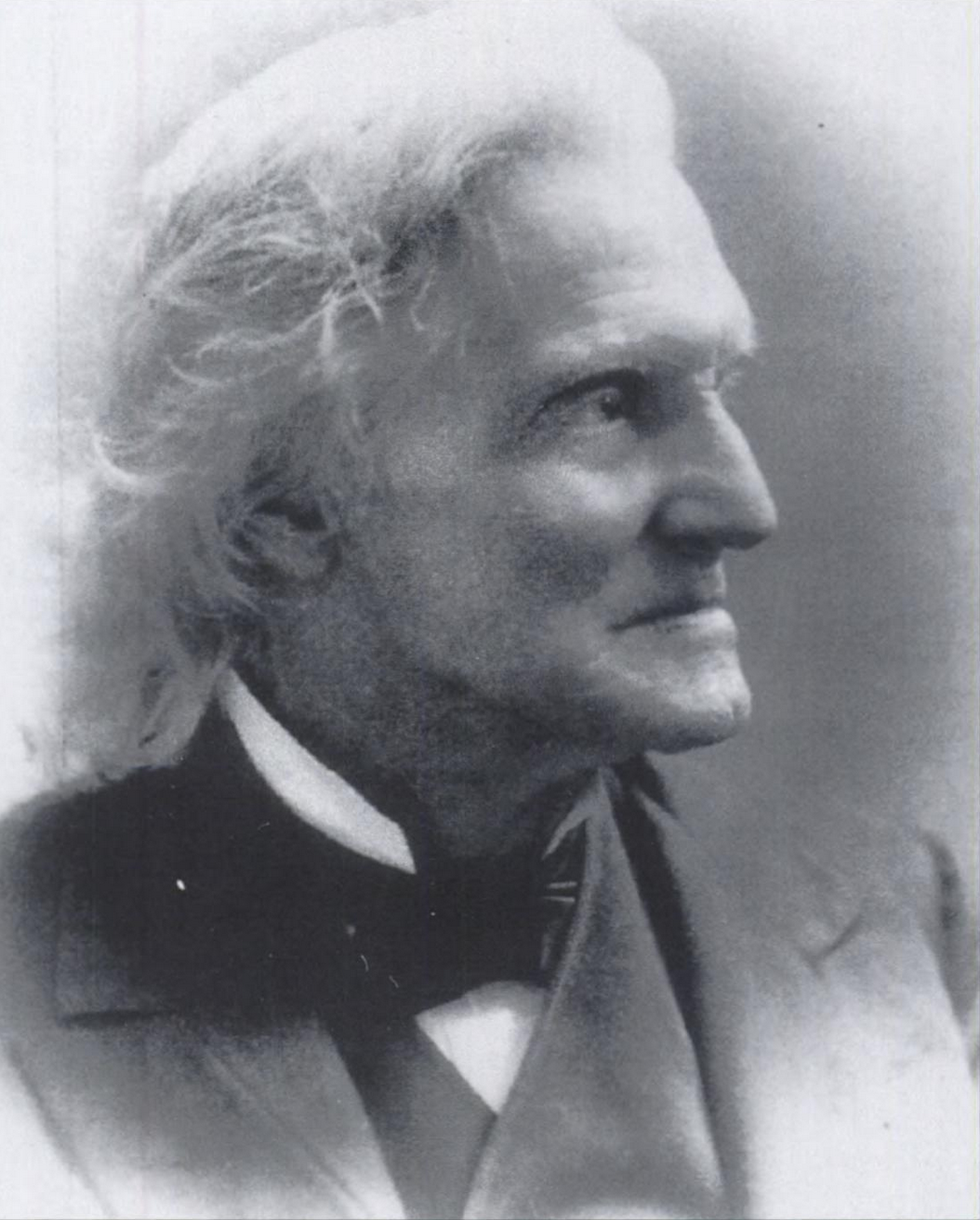
Milton Frank, 1st Village President of Southport and 1st Mayor of Kenosha.

| Order | President | Term start | Term end |
|---|---|---|---|
| 1 | Michael Frank | 1841 | 1842 |
| 2 | William Bullen | 1842 | 1843 |
| 3 | John W. McKoy | 1843 | 1844 |
| 4 | Sereno Fisk | 1844 | 1846 |
| 5 | Theodore Newell | 1846 | 1847 |
| 6 | John W. McKoy | 1847 | 1848 |
| 7 | Michael Holmes | 1848 | 1849 |
| 8 | William S. Strong | 1849 | 1850 |

== Mayors (1850–1922) ==
In 1850, Kenosha was incorporated as a city using the Mayor-Aldermanic system of government with the first officeholders elected in an 1850 general election.

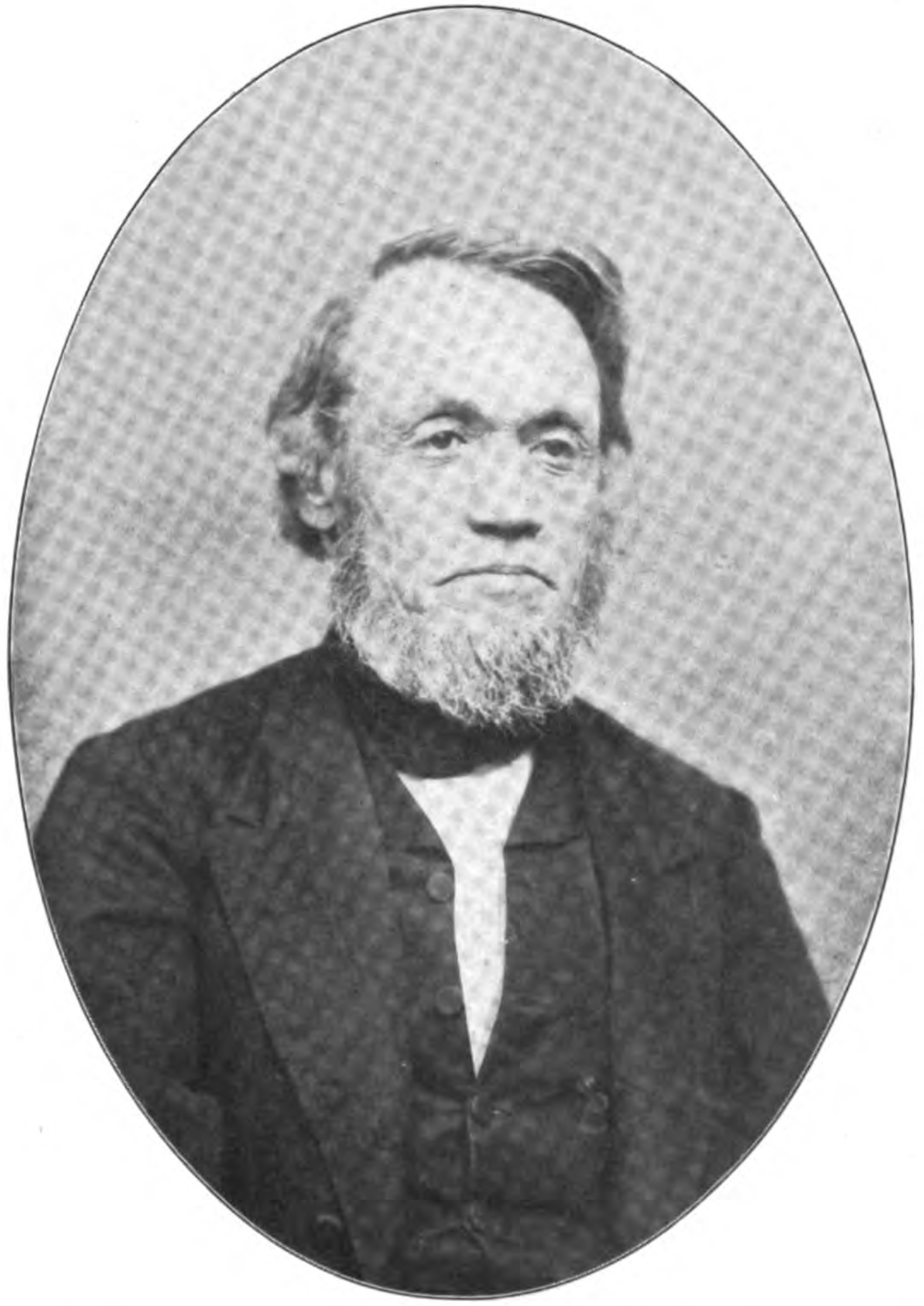
Charles Sholes, 3rd Mayor of Kenosha.

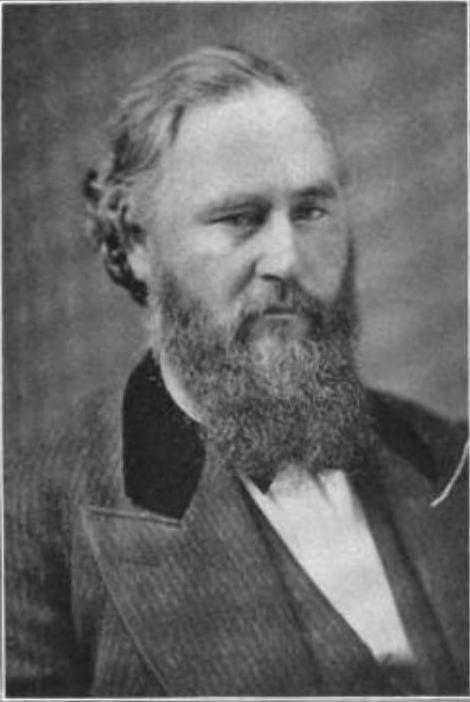
Asahel Farr, 6th, 10th, 17th, and 21st Mayor of Kenosha.

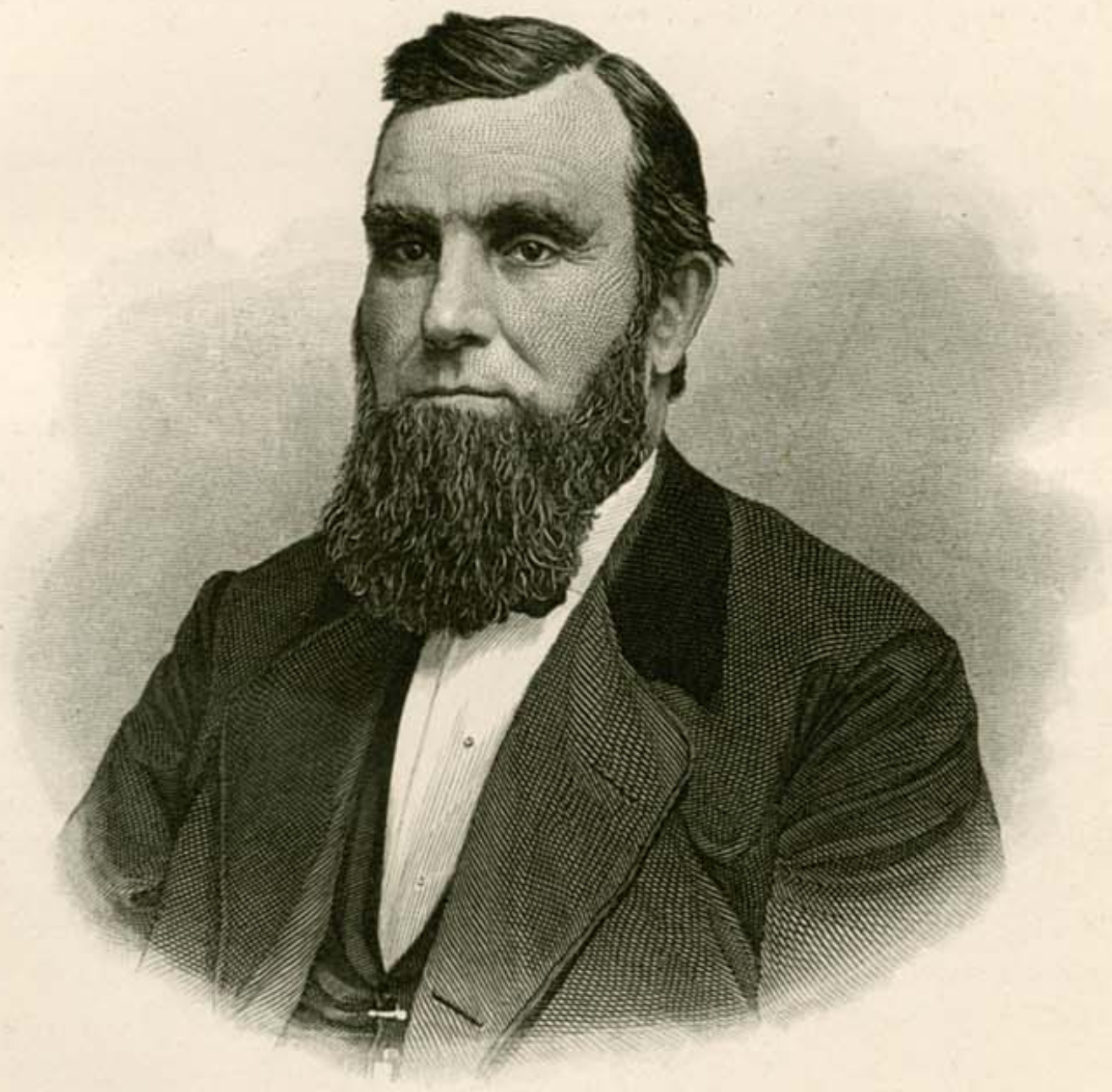
Milton H. Pettit, 8th, 11th, 13th, and 16th Mayor of Kenosha.

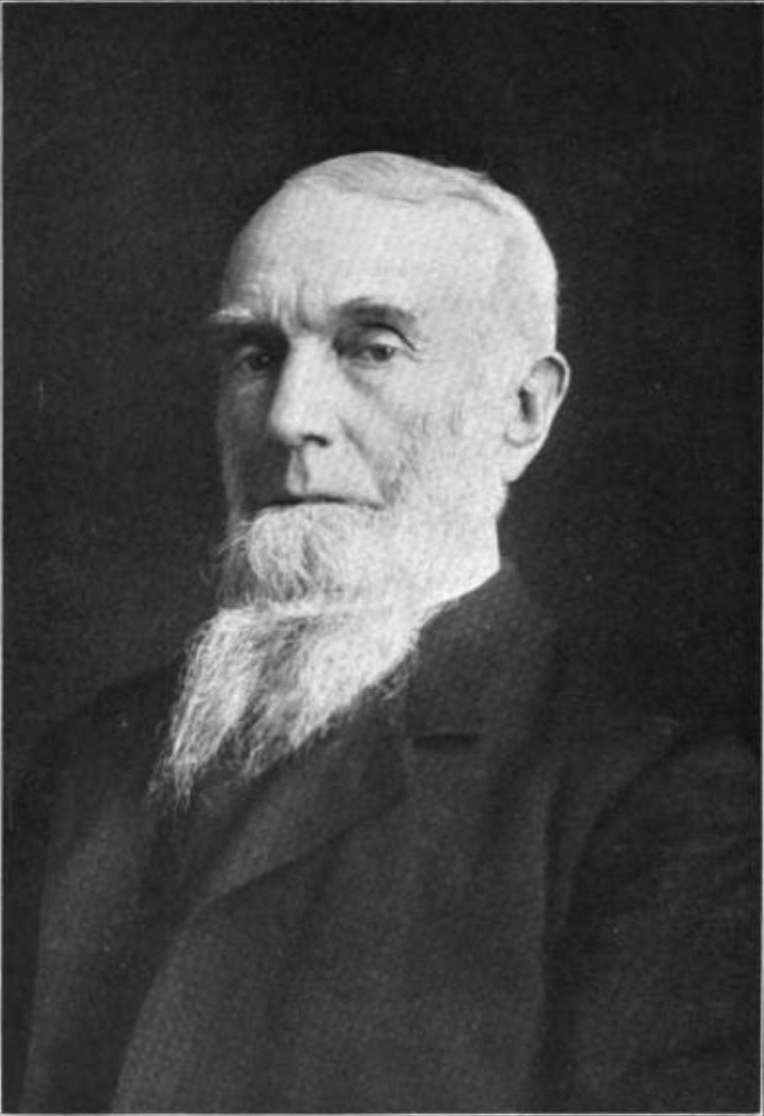
Zalmon G. Simmons, 26th Mayor of Kenosha.

| Order | Mayor | Term start | Term end | Notes |
|---|---|---|---|---|
| 1 | Michael Frank | 1850 | 1851 | |
| 2 | David C. Gaskill | 1851 | 1852 | |
| 3 | Charles C. Sholes | 1852 | 1856 | |
| 4 | Volney Hughes | 1856 | 1857 | |
| 5 | George Howard Paul | 1857 | 1859 | |
| 6 | Asahel Farr | 1859 | 1860 | |
| 7 | Isaac W. Webster | 1860 | 1861 | |
| 8 | Milton H. Pettit | 1861 | 1862 | |
| 9 | Frederick Robinson | 1862 | 1864 | |
| 10 | Asahel Farr | 1864 | 1865 | |
| 11 | Milton H. Pettit | 1865 | 1866 | |
| 12 | Dennis J. Hynes | 1866 | 1867 | |
| 13 | Milton H. Pettit | 1867 | 1868 | |
| 14 | Isaac W. Webster | 1868 | 1869 | |
| 15 | Frederick Robinson | 1869 | 1870 | |
| 16 | Milton H. Pettit | 1870 | 1871 | |
| 17 | Asahel Farr | 1871 | 1874 | |
| 18 | Isaac W. Webster | 1874 | 1875 | |
| 19 | Otis G. King | 1875 | 1876 | |
| 20 | Joseph V. Quarles | 1876 | 1877 | |
| 21 | Asahel Farr | 1877 | 1879 | |
| 22 | Frederick Robinson | 1879 | 1880 | |
| 23 | A. C. Sinclair | 1880 | 1881 | |
| 24 | Henry Williams | 1881 | 1883 | |
| 25 | O. S. Newell | 1883 | 1884 | |
| 26 | Zalmon G. Simmons | 1884 | 1886 | |
| 27 | Emory L. Grant | 1886 | 1887 | |
| 28 | Fred Stemm | 1887 | 1888 | |
| 29 | Henry Williams | 1888 | 1890 | |
| 30 | John B. Kupfer | 1890 | 1891 | |
| 31 | Ossian Marsh Pettit | 1891 | 1894 | Son of former Mayor Milton Pettit |
| 32 | William M. Farr | 1894 | 1897 | |
| 33 | Frank C. Culley | 1897 | 1898 | |
| 34 | Ossian Marsh Pettit | 1898 | 1899 | |
| 35 | James Gorman | 1899 | 1902 | |
| 36 | Charles H. Pfennig | 1902 | 1904 | |
| 37 | James Gorman | 1904 | 1908 | |
| 38 | Mathias J. Scholey | 1908 | 1912 | |
| 39 | Daniel O. Head | 1912 | 1914 | |
| 40 | Mathias J. Scholey | 1914 | 1916 | |
| 41 | Charles H. Pfennig | 1916 | 1918 | |
| 42 | John G. Joachim | 1918 | 1922 | |

== City managers (1922–1958) ==
In 1921, Kenosha elected to move to a council-manager style government where the chief executive and administrator was a city manager elected by the city commissioners.

| Order | Manager | Term start | Term end | Notes |
|---|---|---|---|---|
| 1 | C. M. Osborne | 1922 | 1928 | |
| 2 | William E. O'Brien | 1928 | 1933 | |
| 3 | Harold C. Laughlin | 1933 | 1941 | |
| 4 | LeRoy Wolfe Sr. | 1941 | 1942 | |
| 5 | James G. Wallace | 1942 | 1946 | Resigned |
| — | Robert V. Baker | 1946 | 1947 | Acting |
| 6 | Albert E. Axtell | 1947 | 1952 | |
| 7 | Richard H. Custer | 1952 | 1957 | Resigned |
| — | Robert V. Baker (1903–1968) | 1957 | 1958 | Acting |

== Mayors (1958–present) ==
In 1957, Kenosha elected to return to a Mayor-Aldermanic system of government with officeholders to be elected in April 1958 general elections.

| Order | mage | Mayor | Term start | Term end | Notes |
|---|---|---|---|---|---|
| 43 | | Eugene R. Hammond | 1958 | 1966 | Resigned |
| — | | Hiene Borden (1913–2006) | January 1967 | 1967 | Interim |
| 44 | | Wallace E. Burkee (1926–2014) | April 1967 | April 1976 | Defeated in 1976 primary |
| 45 | | Paul W. Saftig (1926–2010) | 1976 | 1980 | |
| 46 | | John D. Bilotti (1944–) | 1980 | 1987 | Resigned to accept appointment to Wisconsin Department of Revenue |
| — | | Eugene J. Dorff (1930–2005) | June 15, 1987 | April 19, 1988 | Interim |
| 47 | | Patrick E. Moran (1947–) | April 19, 1988 | 1992 | Resigned 7 weeks prior to end of term to accept position with Merkt Cheese Co. |
| — | | Dennis Wade (1952–2005) | 1992 | April 15, 1992 | Interim |
| 48 | | John Antaramian (1954–) | 1992 | 2008 | Elected in 1992, 1996, 2000, 2004. Did not run in 2008. |
| 49 | | Keith Bosman (1944–) | April 15, 2008 | April 19, 2016 | |
| 50 | | John Antaramian (1954–) | April 19, 2016 | April 16, 2024 | Longest-serving mayor in city history |
| 51 | | David Bogdala | April 16, 2024 | present | Current mayor |

== See also ==
- Kenosha, Wisconsin
- Kenosha County, Wisconsin
