= John Antaramian =

American politician (born 1954)

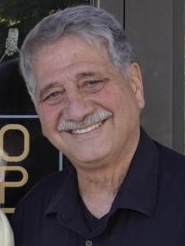
- Antaramian in 2023

48th & 50th Mayor of Kenosha
- In office April 19, 2016 – April 16, 2024
- Preceded by: Keith Bosman
- Succeeded by: David Bogdala
- In office April 1992 – April 15, 2008
- Preceded by: Patrick Moran
- Succeeded by: Keith Bosman

Member of the Wisconsin State Assembly
- In office January 3, 1985 – January 4, 1993
- Preceded by: Joanne Huelsman
- Succeeded by: Robert Wirch
- Constituency: 65th Assembly district
- In office January 3, 1983 – January 3, 1985
- Preceded by: Thomas A. Hauke
- Succeeded by: Thomas A. Hauke
- Constituency: 23rd Assembly district

Personal details
- Born: John Martin Antaramian; September 21, 1954 (age 72) Kenosha, Wisconsin, U.S.
- Party: Democratic
- Spouse: Linda
- Children: 2
- Education: University of Wisconsin–Parkside (BS)
- Website: Campaign website (archived)

John Martin Antaramian (born September 21, 1954) is an American businessman and Democratic politician from Kenosha, Wisconsin. He has served a total of 24 years as mayor of Kenosha, having been in office from 1992 to 2008 and again from 2016 to 2024. He also represented Kenosha for 10 years in the Wisconsin State Assembly, from 1983 to 1993.

== Early life and education ==
John Antaramian was born and raised and has lived most of his life in Kenosha, Wisconsin. He graduated from George Nelson Tremper High School and went on to attend Kenosha's University of Wisconsin–Parkside, where he earned his bachelor's degree in economics and business management in 1977.

== Career ==
=== State Assembly ===
After graduating from college, Antaramian became an assistant manager at a Kenosha Walgreens drug store. At age 25, in 1980, he made his first run for Wisconsin State Assembly, launching a primary challenge against five-term incumbent state representative Eugene Dorff in the 65th Assembly district. Antaramian ran a spirited campaign, attacking Dorff for becoming inaccessible to his constituents and not taking a significant part in the business of the Assembly. The primary results were surprisingly tight, with Antaramian falling just 196 votes short. Antaramian said he was satisfied that he had sent a message to Dorff, and promised he would run again in 1982.

In January 1982, Dorff removed the possibility for a rematch by announcing that he would not run for another term. Three candidates entered the contest for the Democratic nomination to succeed Dorff in what was then the 23rd Assembly district (due to a court-ordered redistricting plan that had been implemented that spring), but one candidate dropped out before the election. Antaramian based his primary campaign on juvenile law reforms, saying that juveniles accused of severe crimes should face adult court and exceptions from the limits on penalties for juvenile offenders. He also advocated for increasing financial penalties for parents of juveniles who engage in certain crimes, and wanted Wisconsin's drinking age raised to 19. His principal opponent in the race was former county board chairman Ronald C. Frederick. Antaramian prevailed with 55% of the vote. He was unopposed in the general election and assumed office in January 1983.

After another redistricting in 1983, Antaramian was back in the 65th Assembly district, where he was easily elected to four more terms in the Assembly, in 1984, 1986, 1988, and 1990. For several consecutive sessions, Antaramian pushed for a state health insurance program to cover the estimated 500,000 Wisconsinites who then were lacking insurance coverage, seeking to expand on the WISCONCARE plan passed in 1985. Though he didn't succeed, a version of this program (BadgerCare) was made possible in the 1990s due to the passage of the federal Children's Health Insurance Program. During the 1991–1992 term, Antaramian was assigned to the powerful budget-writing Joint Finance Committee.

=== First mayoral terms ===
In the fall of 1991, Antaramian announced he would run for mayor in 1992, challenging incumbent mayor Patrick Moran. In announcing his campaign, he also laid out three pillars to his platform: implementation of zero-based budgeting for the city, allocation of additional land and funding to industrial development for business and job growth, and expansion of community policing. The race ultimately drew several other candidates; the incumbent mayor, Moran, withdrew from the race in January, citing family health problems. Antaramian came in first in the nonpartisan primary, taking 59% of the vote. He defeated city councilmember Keith Bosman in the April general election. He went on to win re-election in 1996, 2000, and 2004, leaving office in 2008.

After leaving the mayor's office, he started a consulting business. He was also a visiting professor at Carthage College.

=== Return to office ===
In 2015, Mayor Keith Bosman announced he would not run for a third term. Antaramian immediately confirmed that he was considering running for mayor again. After Antaramian formally entered the race, only one other candidate chose to run—first-term city councilmember Bob Johnson. After a brief but bitter campaign, Antaramian easily prevailed in the Spring 2016 election, receiving 63% of the vote.

Antaramian suffered a heart attack at his home on May 27, 2019. He was able to receive medical attention and had a heart catheterization procedure; he ultimately made a successful recovery. Despite the health scare, Antaramian showed no hesitation about running for another term as mayor, announcing that fall that he would stand for election to a sixth term in 2020.

He faced no opposition in the 2020 Spring election, which was complicated by the arrival of the COVID-19 pandemic in Wisconsin. Antaramian advocated for the entire election to be conducted via mail-in ballot, to encourage social distancing, but ultimately the city did still open ten in-person polling places on election day.

=== Shooting of Jacob Blake ===
Following the unrest after the shooting of Jacob Blake in August 2020, Antaramian requested the presence of the Wisconsin National Guard in Kenosha. Hundreds of protesters later forced Antaramian to relocate his press conference on the shooting from a local park to the city's public safety building, where the protestors were contained by police with pepper spray after tearing the building's front entrance door from its hinges.

In an interview days after the shooting, Antaramian said visits to Kenosha by President Donald Trump or then-candidate Joe Biden would be "too soon," saying that "...the President is always welcome, but at this time, it's just the wrong time." Trump would visit on September 1, and Biden on September 3.

=== Later years ===
The Fall general election in 2020 was also affected by the COVID-19 pandemic, for which there was not yet a vaccine at that time. Antaramian remained an advocate for vote-by-mail and other early voting options which allowed voters to avoid congregating in person at polling places. In October 2020, Antaramian participated in a challenge with the mayors of Wisconsin's five largest cities (Racine's Cory Mason, Milwaukee's Tom Barrett, Green Bay's Eric Genrich, and Madison's Satya Rhodes-Conway) to see which city would have the highest rate of absentee and early voting. U.S. President Donald Trump attacked the increase of absentee voting, alleging that it was a source of voter fraud; those attacks only increased after Trump lost the 2020 United States presidential election. Wisconsin, in particular, was a target of these accusations.

Responding to Trump's continuing complaints, his Republican allies in the Wisconsin Legislature appointed former Wisconsin Supreme Court justice Michael Gableman to investigate those fraud allegations. The investigation lasted just over a year, and saw Gableman attempt to subpoena Antaramian and the other mayors. Gableman's investigation quickly devolved into a series of accusations and conspiracy theories. Gableman implied that the election process had been corrupted by the cities receiving election support funding from the non-profit Center for Tech and Civic Life. Antaramian described the investigation as a waste of time and money. Ultimately, Gableman was fired by Republican Assembly speaker Robin Vos in August 2022.

In May 2023, Antaramian announced that he would not run for a seventh term in 2024. After the primary, he endorsed longtime city councilmember David Bogdala, who went on to win the election to succeed him.

== Personal life and family ==
John Antaramian is one of four children born to Martin B. Antaramian and his wife Noreen (née Semerdjian). Both parents were first generation Americans, the children of Armenian immigrants from what was then the Ottoman Empire. Martin Antaramian was a successful lawyer in Kenosha for 43 years, in partnership with his brother, Richard, who was also a municipal judge. He was also prominent in the state bar association, in state Freemasonry, and in the local veteran community.

On January 16, 1982, John Antaramian married Linda Catherine Wesnick at St. Hagop Armenian Apostolic Church in Racine, Wisconsin. John and his wife still reside in Kenosha. They have two adult children.

A cousin of Antaramian, 42-year-old Sandra Mardoian Kenaga, was killed in a mass shooting at a McDonald's restaurant in Kenosha on August 10, 1993.

== Electoral history ==
=== Wisconsin Assembly, 65th district (1980) ===
Year	Election	Date	Elected				Defeated				Total	Plurality
1980	Primary	Sep. 9	Eugene Dorff (inc)	Democratic	4,289	51.17%	John Antaramian	Dem.	4,093	48.83%	8,382	196

=== Wisconsin Assembly, 23rd district (1982) ===
Year	Election	Date	Elected				Defeated				Total	Plurality
1982	Primary	Sep. 14	John Antaramian	Democratic	4,084	55.69%	Ronald J. Frederick	Dem.	3,249	44.31%	7,333	835
1982	General	Nov. 2	John Antaramian	Democratic	10,825	100.0%	--unopposed--				10,825	10,825

=== Wisconsin Assembly, 65th district (1984, 1986, 1988, 1990) ===
Year	Election	Date	Elected				Defeated				Total	Plurality
1984	General	Nov. 6	John Antaramian	Democratic	15,688	100.0%	--unopposed--				15,688	15,688
1986	General	Nov. 4	John Antaramian (inc)	Democratic	9,628	77.83%	Kevin T. Graham	Rep.	2,742	22.17%	12,370	6,886
1988	General	Nov. 8	John Antaramian (inc)	Democratic	15,438	100.0%	--unopposed--				15,438	15,438
1990	General	Nov. 6	John Antaramian (inc)	Democratic	7,524	68.03%	Cynthia Johnson	Rep.	3,536	31.97%	11,060	3,988

=== Kenosha Mayor (1992, 1996, 2000, 2004) ===
Year	Election	Date	Elected				Defeated				Total	Plurality
1992	Primary	Feb. 18	John Antaramian	Democratic	8,458	59.09%	Keith Bosman	Dem.	2,464	17.21%	14,314	5,994
1992	Primary	Feb. 18	John Antaramian	Democratic	8,458	59.09%	Louis Rugani	Ind.	1,735	12.12%	14,314	5,994
1992	Primary	Feb. 18	John Antaramian	Democratic	8,458	59.09%	Jeffrey Wolkomir	Ind.	1,657	11.58%	14,314	5,994
1992	General	Apr. 7	John Antaramian	Democratic	14,632	67.20%	Keith Bosman	Dem.	7,143	32.80%	21,775	7,489
1996	General	Mar. 19	John Antaramian (inc)	Democratic	10,031	64.59%	Scott Barter	Ind.	5,499	35.41%	15,530	4,532

== See also ==
- List of mayors of Kenosha, Wisconsin

Wisconsin State Assembly
Preceded by Thomas A. Hauke	Member of the Wisconsin State Assembly from the 23rd district 1983–1985	Succeeded by Thomas A. Hauke
Preceded by Joanne Huelsman	Member of the Wisconsin State Assembly from the 65th district 1985–1993	Succeeded by Robert Wirch
Political offices
Preceded by Patrick Moran	Mayor of Kenosha, Wisconsin; 1992–2008	Succeeded by Keith Bosman
Preceded by Keith Bosman	Mayor of Kenosha, Wisconsin; 2016–present	Incumbent
