= John Bullen Jr. =

Founder of Kenosha, Wisconsin

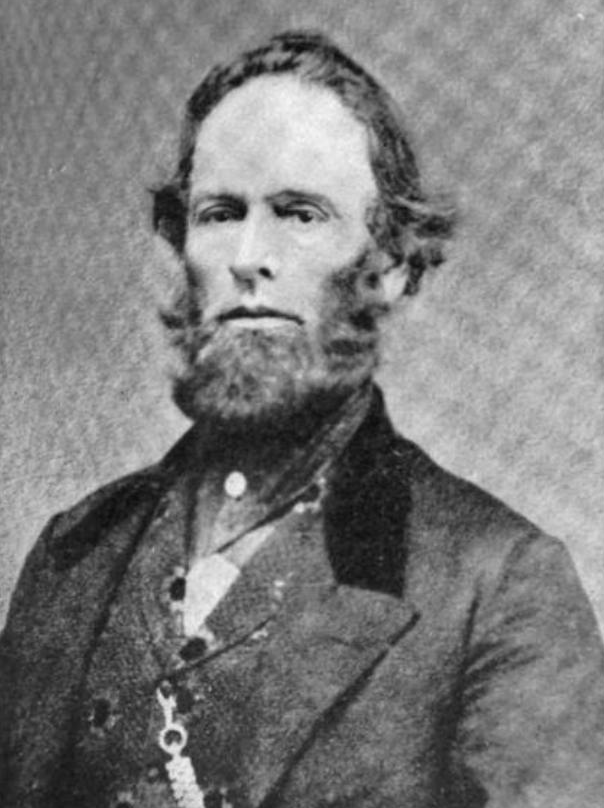

Member of the Minnesota House of Representatives from the 11th district
- In office January 4, 1870 – January 2, 1871 Serving with John M. Cool
- Preceded by: John Ball, George B. Dresbach, & H. W. Hill
- Succeeded by: John M. Cool, Sam Y. Hyde, & J. Q. A. Vale

Personal details
- Born: May 16, 1803 Clinton, Oneida County, New York, U.S.
- Died: May 9, 1884 (aged 80) Elba, Minnesota, U.S.
- Resting place: Green Ridge Cemetery, Kenosha, Wisconsin
- Party: Democratic
- Spouse: Henrietta Mygatt (m. 1826–1884)
- Children: John Bullen VI^{(b. 1827; died 1888)}; Mary Louise (Sykes)^{(b. 1829)}; William Bullen^{(b. 1832; died 1832)}; Sylvester Bullen^{(b. 1833; died 1873)}; Wallace Bullen^{(b. 1835; died 1897)}; Signora Bullen^{(b. 1836; died 1837)}; Robert Bullen^{(b. 1842; died 1913)}; Josephine Bullen^{(b. 1844; died 1849)}; Josephine (Brooks)^{(b. 1849; died 1944)}
- Parent: John Bullen Sr. (father)
- Relatives: William Bullen (brother); Thomas B. Bullene (half-brother); Joseph V. Quarles Jr. (nephew); Winslow Bullen (cousin)

John Bullen V (May 16, 1803 – May 9, 1884), commonly known as John Bullen Jr., was an American merchant, farmer, pioneer of Wisconsin and Minnesota. He was the founder of Kenosha, Wisconsin, and the namesake of Bullen Middle School in Kenosha. Later in life, he moved to Minnesota and served in the Minnesota House of Representatives.

== Early life ==
John Bullen was born in Clinton, Oneida County, New York, in 1803, and was raised there. As a young man he suffered a severe cold that developed into pneumonia, and was sent to Labrador to recuperate. As an adult, he resided in Hannibal, New York, and was appointed postmaster there.

== Western Emigration Company ==
In December 1834, he hosted a meeting of his family and friends to discuss emigrating to the western territories. In a subsequent meeting in February 1835 they formalized their plans and established the "Western Emigration Company" to facilitate their project. They sold stock in the company at $10 per share and ultimately raised $4,000—shares became a popular commodity in the area with less wealthy individuals buying stock to obtain a share of the return on the wealth of the new land. This ultimately proved a poor investment, because proceeds could only be returned to investors if the claimed land was later sold, which the settlers had no intention of doing. The end result was that the settlement at Kenosha benefited the Bullens and their close friends at the expense of several hundred investors. The company dissolved in 1837, after settlement was established.

In March 1835, a committee was sent west to explore land for possible settlement on the western shore of Lake Michigan. The committee initially attempted to establish a purchase at the mouth of the Root River—at the site of the present city of Racine, Wisconsin—but were unable to come to terms with the inhabitants of the area, led by Gilbert Knapp. The company chose to send another expedition under the sole authority of John Bullen, Jr., in June 1835—he was accompanied on this mission by his brother William. The Bullens settled on a spot just south of the Root River at the mouth of the Pike Creek, and began claiming land.

During the Winter of 1835–1836, the Bullen brothers returned to Oswego County, New York, and purchased a 100-ton schooner—the Martin Van Buren—and loaded it with seeds, provisions, and tools, to return to their settlement. On their return, John went to Chicago and purchased a herd of cattle and drove them north to their claim. Soon after, John went into business with Samuel Hale, Jr., in a store known as "Hale & Bullen"—one of the first four businesses in the village.

The inhabitants chose to name their settlement the village of "Southport" in 1837. It was incorporated as the city of Kenosha in 1850. Bullen served several years as a trustee of the village of Southport and served on the board of county commissioners (the predecessor to the board of supervisors).

== Later years ==
Bullen's land holdings and merchandise business prospered until the Panic of 1857, which nearly ruined him. He subsequently left Kenosha and settled on a farm in Winona County, Minnesota, and re-established a merchandising business in Elba, Minnesota. In Minnesota, he was elected to the Minnesota House of Representatives in 1869, serving in the 12th Minnesota Legislature. He also served on the Winona County board of county commissioners. He died in Elba in 1884.

== Family and legacy ==
John Bullen V was the son of John Bullen IV—referred to in most contemporaneous documents as "John Bullen, Sr." John Bullen IV had served as a captain in the New York militia during the War of 1812. His father, John Bullen III, had served in the Massachusetts militia in the American Revolutionary War and afterwards was involved as a captain in Shays' Rebellion. Bullen and his company settled the area of Clinton, Oneida County, New York, as they fled the suppression of their rebellion.

John Bullen IV followed his sons to their settlement in the Wisconsin Territory in 1837 and operated a tavern in the area now known as Salem Lakes, Wisconsin. He was appointed a brigadier general of the Wisconsin Territory militia by Governor Henry Dodge in 1839. Other children of John Bullen IV also settled in Wisconsin.

John's younger brother, William Bullen, owned the western half of Simmons Island in Kenosha (then known as Washington Island). He served in the Wisconsin Territory legislative assembly from 1838 through 1842.

John's sister, Caroline Bullen, taught school in Southport and married Joseph V. Quarles, Sr. Her son, Joseph V. Quarles, Jr., became a United States senator and United States district judge.

Thomas B. Bullene, the 22nd mayor of Kansas City, Missouri, was a half-brother of William Bullen.

John Bullen V married Henrietta Mygatt on September 28, 1826. They had nine children together, though three died in childhood. Two of Bullen's sons served in the Union Army in the American Civil War. Wallace served in the 1st Wisconsin Infantry Regiment; Robert served in the 22nd Wisconsin Infantry Regiment and later earned a commission in the 1st Wisconsin Heavy Artillery Regiment.

John Bullen Middle School in Kenosha was named for him.

Minnesota House of Representatives
Preceded by John Ball, George B. Dresbach, & H. W. Hill	Member of the Minnesota House of Representatives from the 11th district January 4, 1870 – January 2, 1871; Served alongside: John M. Cool	Succeeded by John M. Cool, Sam Y. Hyde, & J. Q. A. Vale
