= John B. Kupfer =

German-American politician and businessman

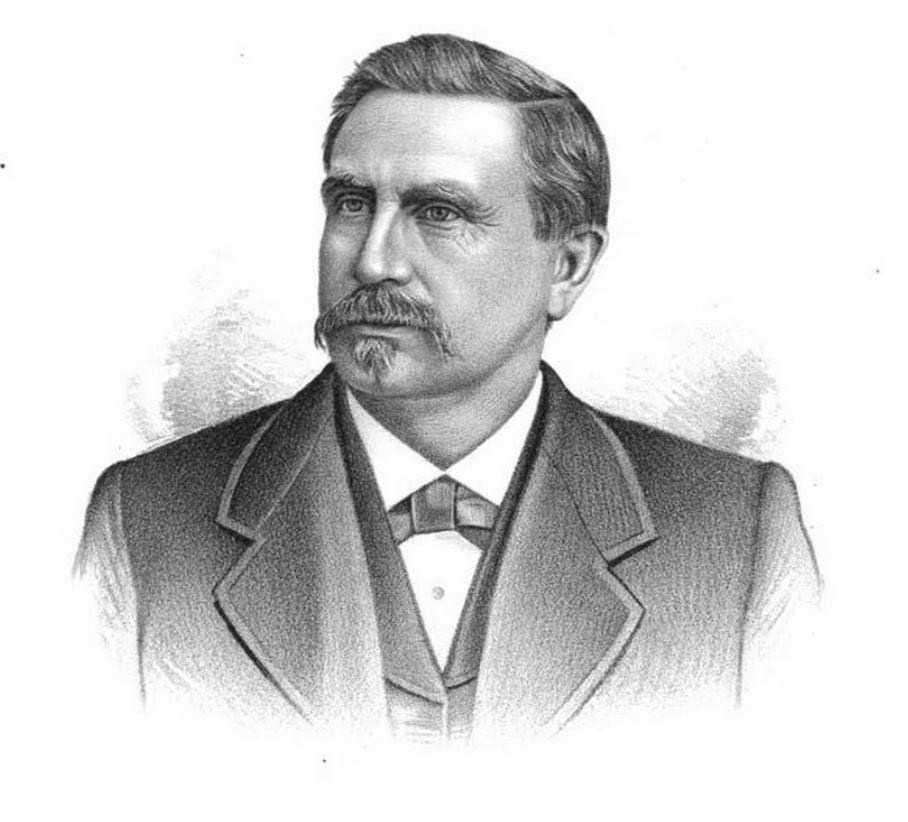

30th Mayor of Kenosha
- Preceded by: Henry Williams
- Succeeded by: O. M. Pettit

Personal details
- Born: Johann Kupfer; March 10, 1833 Hausen, Upper Franconia, Kingdom of Bavaria
- Died: September 9, 1897 Kenosha, Wisconsin
- Party: Democratic
- Occupation: Politician, Businessman

John B. Kupfer (March 10, 1833 – September 9, 1897) was an American politician and businessman from Kenosha, Wisconsin, who served as the 30th mayor of Kenosha from 1890 to 1891 as a member of the Democratic Party.

== Business career ==
John Kupfer came from the Kingdom of Bavaria. In 1859, Kupfer established a bakery that would become the Kupfer Cracker Company. He is noted as the inventor of the Kenosha Cracker.

== Political career ==
As mayor, John oversaw the construction of Kenosha’s sewer system, grading of streets, and organizing of a formal police force. He also oversaw the construction of Kenosha's high school and fire house. In addition to serving as mayor, Kufper served a five-year term as county supervisor of Kenosha County, Wisconsin. Politically, he was a Democrat.

== Personal life ==
John Kupfer's son, William Kupfer, married Philomena Pirsch, sister of fire apparatus inventor Peter Pirsch.

He died on September 8, 1897.
