= Joseph V. Quarles =

American politician (1843–1911)

The Honorable Joseph V. Quarles
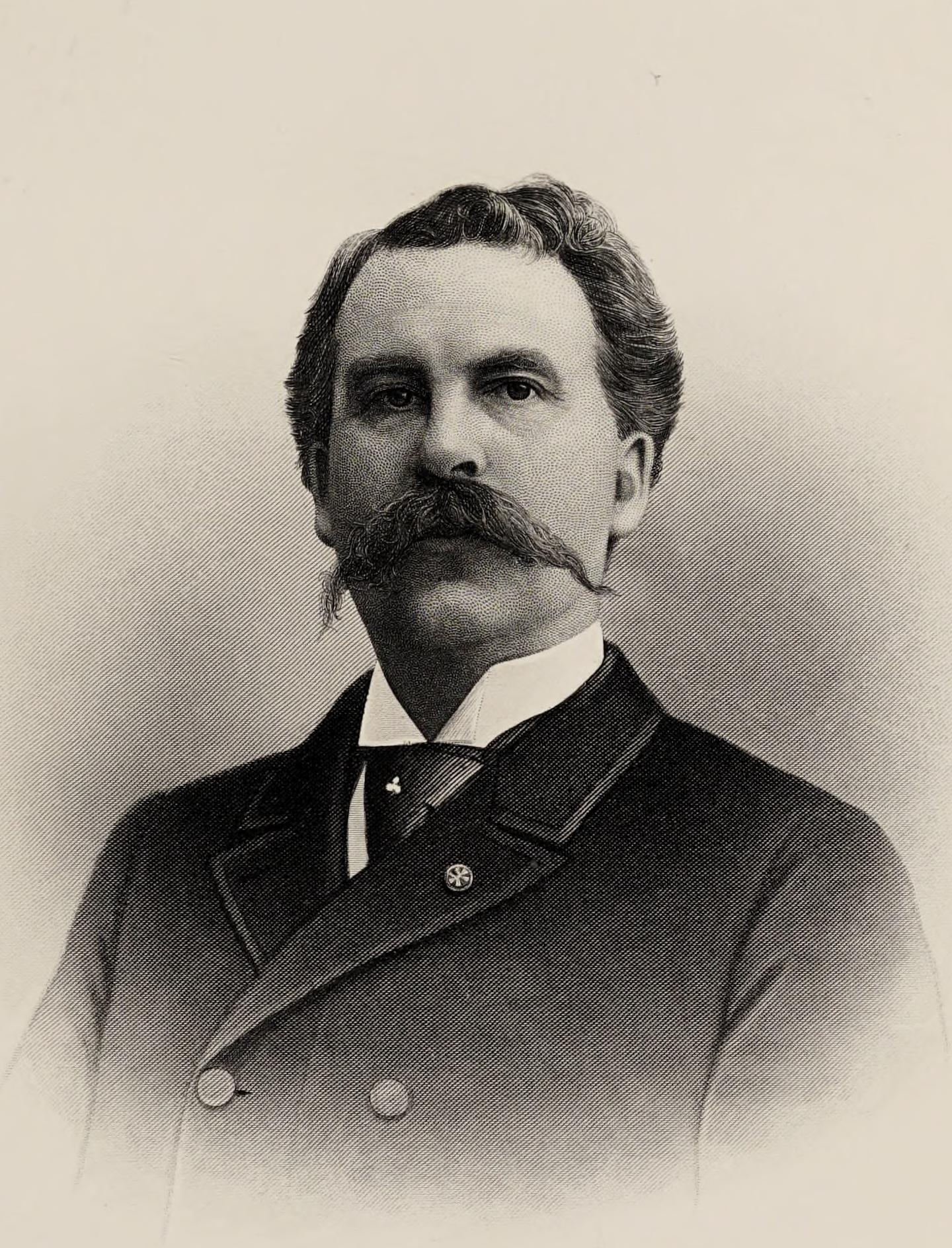

United States District Judge for the Eastern District of Wisconsin
- In office March 6, 1905 – October 7, 1911
- Appointed by: Theodore Roosevelt
- Preceded by: William Henry Seaman
- Succeeded by: Ferdinand August Geiger

United States Senator from Wisconsin
- In office March 4, 1899 – March 3, 1905
- Preceded by: John L. Mitchell
- Succeeded by: Robert M. La Follette

Member of the Wisconsin Senate from the 8th district
- In office January 5, 1880 – January 2, 1882
- Preceded by: Benoni Reynolds
- Succeeded by: Charles Palmetier

Member of the Wisconsin State Assembly from the Kenosha County district
- In office January 6, 1879 – January 5, 1880
- Preceded by: Walter L. Dexter
- Succeeded by: Cornelius Williams

20th Mayor of Kenosha, Wisconsin
- In office April 1876 – April 1877
- Preceded by: Otis G. King
- Succeeded by: Asahel Farr

Personal details
- Born: Joseph Very Quarles Jr. December 16, 1843 Southport, Wisconsin Territory
- Died: October 7, 1911 (aged 67) Milwaukee, Wisconsin, U.S.
- Resting place: Green Ridge Cemetery, Kenosha, Wisconsin
- Party: Republican
- Spouse: Caroline Adelaide Saunders (m. 1868–1911)
- Children: William Charles Quarles^{(b. 1870; died 1939)}; Joseph Very Quarles^{(b. 1874; died 1946)}; Edward Louis Quarles^{(b. 1876; died 1941)}
- Parents: Joseph V. Quarles (father); Caroline (Bullen) Quarles (mother)
- Relatives: John Bullen Jr. (uncle); William Bullen (uncle)
- Education: University of Michigan (A.B., LL.B.)
- Profession: lawyer, judge

Military service
- Allegiance: United States
- Branch/service: United States Volunteers; Union Army
- Years of service: 1864–1865
- Rank: 1st Lieutenant, USV
- Unit: 39th Reg. Wis. Vol. Infantry
- Battles/wars: American Civil War

Joseph Very Quarles Jr. (December 16, 1843 – October 7, 1911) was an American lawyer, Republican politician, and Wisconsin pioneer. He served as a United States senator from Wisconsin from 1899 to 1905; he was subsequently appointed United States district judge for the Eastern District of Wisconsin and served from 1905 until his death in 1911. During his career as an attorney, he was one of the founders of the firm Quarles & Brady, which still exists.

Earlier in his career, he was the 20th mayor of Kenosha, Wisconsin, represented Kenosha County in the Wisconsin Legislature, and served as an officer in the Union Army during the American Civil War. He was a nephew of John Bullen Jr. and William Bullen, who established the first settlement at Kenosha.

== Early life and education ==
Joseph V. Quarles was born December 16, 1843, in what is now Kenosha, Wisconsin. At the time, it was the village of Southport, in the Wisconsin Territory. He was raised and educated in Kenosha, and then went on to attend the University of Michigan.

He interrupted his education in 1864 to enlist for service in the Union Army, answering the call for 100-day enlistments. He was enrolled in the 39th Wisconsin Infantry Regiment, as first lieutenant of Company C. The 39th Wisconsin Infantry mustered into federal service in June 1864 and traveled to Tennessee. Quarles was detailed as an ordinance inspector for much of the 100 day service.

After the expiration of his 100 day enlistment, Quarles returned to the University of Michigan where he earned his bachelor's degree in 1866. He continued his education at the University of Michigan Law School and earned his LL.B. in 1867.

== Career ==
Quarles then returned to Kenosha. He was admitted to the bar and conducted a law practice there from 1868 to 1882. He was the district attorney for Kenosha County from 1870 to 1876. He was the mayor of Kenosha in 1876. He was a member of the Wisconsin State Assembly in 1879. He was a member of the Wisconsin State Senate from 1880 to 1882. He resumed private practice in Racine, Wisconsin from 1882 to 1888, and in Milwaukee, Wisconsin from 1888 to 1899.

=== Congressional service ===
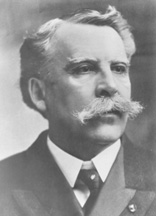

Quarles was elected as a Republican to the United States Senate and served from March 4, 1899, to March 3, 1905. He was not a candidate for reelection in 1905. He was Chairman of the Committee on Transportation Routes to the Seaboard for the 56th United States Congress and Chairman of the Committee on the Census for the 57th and 58th United States Congresses.

=== Federal judicial service ===
Quarles was nominated by President Theodore Roosevelt on March 6, 1905, to a seat on the United States District Court for the Eastern District of Wisconsin vacated by Judge William Henry Seaman.

He was confirmed by the United States Senate on March 6, 1905, and received his commission the same day. His service terminated on October 7, 1911, due to his death.

== Personal life ==
Joseph V. Quarles Jr. was the elder of two sons born to Joseph V. Quarles Sr. and his wife Caroline Bullen. Caroline Bullen was a younger sister of John Bullen Jr. and William Bullen, who established the first settlement at Kenosha, Wisconsin. Their father, John Bullen IV—commonly known as John Bullen Sr.—had been a captain in the New York militia during the War of 1812 and subsequently served as a brigadier general in the Wisconsin Territory militia.

Joseph Quarles Jr. had one younger brother, Charles, who became his law partner.

On September 25, 1868, Joseph Quarles Jr. married Caroline Adelaide Saunders at Douglas County, Kansas. They had three sons together, all of whom survived them.

Quarles died at his home Milwaukee on October 7, 1911, after an illness of several months. He was interred in the City Cemetery in Kenosha (now known as Green Ridge Cemetery).

== Electoral history ==
=== U.S. Senate (1899) ===
United States Senate Election in Wisconsin, 1899
| Party | Candidate | Votes | % |
|---|---|---|---|
6th Vote of the 44th Wisconsin Legislature, January 31, 1899
| Republican | Joseph V. Quarles | 110 | 85.94% |
| Democratic | Timothy E. Ryan | 18 | 14.06% |
| | Absent or not voting | 5 | |
| Majority | | 65 | 50.78% |
| Total votes | | 128 | 96.24% |
| Republican gain from Democratic | | | |

Wisconsin State Assembly
| Preceded by Walter L. Dexter | Member of the Wisconsin State Assembly from the Kenosha district January 6, 1879 – January 5, 1880 | Succeeded by Cornelius Williams |
Wisconsin Senate
| Preceded by Benoni Reynolds | Member of the Wisconsin Senate from the 8th district January 5, 1880 – January 2, 1882 | Succeeded by Charles Palmetier |
U.S. Senate
| Preceded by John L. Mitchell | U.S. senator (Class 1) from Wisconsin; 1899 – 1905; Served alongside: John Coit Spooner | Succeeded by Robert M. La Follette |
Political offices
| Preceded by Otis G. King | Mayor of Kenosha, Wisconsin; 1876 – 1877 | Succeeded by Asahel Farr |
Legal offices
| Preceded by William Henry Seaman | United States District Judge for the Eastern District of Wisconsin; 1905 – 1911 | Succeeded by Ferdinand August Geiger |
