= Charles H. Pfennig =

American politician (1871–1955)

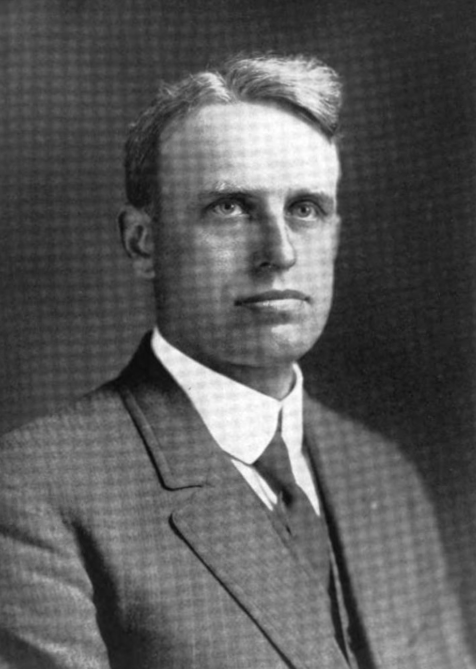

36th and 41st Mayor of Kenosha, Wisconsin
- In office April 1916 – April 1918
- Preceded by: Mathias J. Scholey
- Succeeded by: John G. Joachim
- In office April 14, 1902 – April 1904
- Preceded by: James E. Gorman
- Succeeded by: James E. Gorman

Member of the Wisconsin State Assembly from the Kenosha County district
- In office January 1, 1913 – January 1, 1915
- Preceded by: Mathias J. Scholey
- Succeeded by: Don J. Vincent

Sheriff of Kenosha County, Wisconsin
- In office January 1, 1907 – January 1, 1909
- Preceded by: John H. Veitch
- Succeeded by: W. H. Gunter

Personal details
- Born: January 22, 1871 Neenah, Wisconsin, U.S.
- Died: August 13, 1955 (aged 84) Kenosha, Wisconsin, U.S.
- Resting place: Green Ridge Cemetery, Kenosha
- Party: Republican
- Spouse: Ruth Ann Shields (m. 1905; died 1955)
- Children: Frederick S. Pfennig and 3 daughters
- Occupation: Businessman, politician

Charles Henry Pfennig (January 22, 1871 – August 13, 1955) was an American businessman and Republican politician from Kenosha, Wisconsin. He served as the 36th and 41st mayor of Kenosha, served two years as sheriff of Kenosha County, and represented Kenosha County in the Wisconsin State Assembly for the 51st Wisconsin Legislature (1913–1914).

His son, Frederick S. Pfennig, would also go on to serve in the Wisconsin State Assembly.

== Early life and career ==
Born in Neenah, Wisconsin, Pfennig was still a small child when his parents moved the family to Kenosha, Wisconsin, in 1873. He was educated in public and parochial schools of Kenosha and worked for most of his young adulthood in a retail grocery business owned by his father. In the 1890s, Pfennig became involved with the local volunteer fire department. He became an agent of the Queen Insurance Company, selling fire insurance, and, in 1898, he started his own insurance business. His company would soon expand into real estate, and he would end up running the company—known as Charles H. Pfennig, Inc.—for the rest of his life.

== Political career ==
Pfennig became increasingly involved in local affairs as a member of the board of the YMCA. He joined the Republican Party of Wisconsin and began running for local offices on the Republican ticket. He was an unsuccessful candidate for City Treasurer in 1897 and 1898, but was elected to the City Council in 1900.

After only one term on the city council, in 1902, Pfennig was chosen at the Republican city convention as their candidate for Mayor of Kenosha. Pfennig initially declined the nomination, but accepted after their next choice, Thomas Hansen, also refused. His opponent was incumbent James Gorman, then in his third term as mayor. Pfennig prevailed by a margin of 75 votes in the April election and was inaugurated on April 14, 1902. Gorman returned to run again in 1904, and this time defeated Pfennig. In 1906, however, Pfennig ran for office again, and was narrowly elected to a two-year term as Sheriff of Kenosha County. He did not run for reelection as sheriff in 1908, but was appointed to the city police board after leaving office.

In 1912, Pfennig was the Republican nominee for the Wisconsin State Assembly in the Kenosha County district. He challenged incumbent state representative Mathias J. Scholey, who had also recently served as Mayor of Kenosha.

One of the significant animating issues in the 1912 election was the new state income tax. The income tax—the first in the United States—was created mainly to more equitably distribute the tax burden which had previously fallen almost entirely on farmers and large landowners who bore the brunt of the property tax. It had been approved by referendum in 1908 and was extremely popular among the more rural counties, but was notably extremely unpopular in more urban, industrialized commercial centers like Kenosha.

The income tax was supported by Republican Governor Francis E. McGovern, but was vehemently opposed by both Pfennig and his Democratic opponent. A Kenosha County straw poll taken a month before the election showed strong support for Pfennig despite McGovern running well behind his Democratic opponent and the Republican presidential nominee, William H. Taft, running third behind Woodrow Wilson and Theodore Roosevelt. True to the polls, Pfennig prevailed in the November general election taking 54% of the county vote. Due to his stance on the income tax, Pfennig was expected to take a lead role in the effort to repeal the tax. This effort was ultimately unsuccessful and the Wisconsin income tax became a model for the federal income tax, passed in 1914.

In the Assembly, he was chairman of the Committee on Printing and served on the Committee on Labor.

In 1916, he was elected to another term as Mayor of Kenosha. During World War I, he served as chairman of the Kenosha draft board.

In 1928 Pfennig was again elected to the Kenosha Common Council and was chosen as president of the council in 1930.

== Personal life and family ==
Pfennig married Ruth Ann Shields on January 25, 1905. They had one son, Frederick, and three daughters. She died just a month before him, in June 1955. Charles Pfennig died at Kenosha Hospital on August 13, 1955, after an illness. At the time of his death he had seven grandchildren and one great grandchild.

His son, Frederick S. Pfennig, was also a politician. He represented Kenosha in the Wisconsin State Assembly from 1941 to 1949 and was Republican assistant floor leader in the Assembly for the 1947 session.

In addition to his insurance and real estate business, Pfennig was invested in the Terrace Court Corporation, was a director of the Brown National Bank, and was president of the Greenridge Cemetery Association. He was also a member of the Kenosha Salvation Army, the Benevolent and Protective Order of Elks, Modern Woodmen of America, and Rotary International.

== Electoral history ==
=== Kenosha Treasurer (1897, 1898) ===
Kenosha City Treasurer Election, 1897
Party	Candidate	Votes	%	±%
General Election, April 6, 1897
Democratic	George M. Melville	1,187	54.10%	
Republican	Charles H. Pfennig	1,007	45.90%	
Plurality		180	8.20%	
Total votes		2,194	100.0%	

Kenosha City Treasurer Election, 1898
Party	Candidate	Votes	%	±%
General Election, April 5, 1898
Democratic	George M. Melville (incumbent)	1,153	51.59%	−2.51%
Republican	Charles H. Pfennig	1,082	48.41%	
Plurality		71	3.18%	-5.03%
Total votes		2,235	100.0%	+1.87%
Democratic hold				

=== Kenosha City Council (1900) ===
Kenosha City Council, 2nd Ward Election, 1900
Party	Candidate	Votes	%	±%
General Election, April 3, 1900
Republican	Charles H. Pfennig	158	57.66%	−1.54%
Democratic	Thomas J. Dale	116	42.34%	
Plurality		42	15.33%	-3.07%
Total votes		274	100.0%	+9.60%
Republican hold				

=== Kenosha Mayor (1902, 1904) ===
Kenosha Mayoral Election, 1902
Party	Candidate	Votes	%	±%
General Election, April 1, 1902
Republican	Charles H. Pfennig	1,480	51.30%	
Democratic	James E. Gorman (incumbent)	1,405	48.70%	
Plurality		75	2.60%	
Total votes		2,885	100.0%	
Republican gain from Democratic				

Kenosha Mayoral Election, 1904
Party	Candidate	Votes	%	±%
General Election, April 5, 1904
Democratic	James E. Gorman	1,380	47.15%	−4.15%
Republican	Charles H. Pfennig (incumbent)	1,292	44.14%	−4.56%
Socialist	John Burns	255	8.71%	
Plurality		88	3.01%	+0.41%
Total votes		2,927	100.0%	+1.46%
Democratic gain from Republican		Swing	5.61%	

=== Kenosha Sheriff (1906) ===
Kenosha County Sheriff Election, 1906
Party	Candidate	Votes	%	±%
General Election, November 6, 1906
Republican	Charles H. Pfennig	1,930	47.13%	−3.63%
Democratic	Bernhard M. Schilz	1,873	45.74%	−3.50%
Socialist	Henry Anderson	292	7.13%	
Plurality		57	1.39%	
Total votes		4,095	100.0%	
Republican hold				

=== Wisconsin Assembly (1912) ===
Wisconsin Assembly, Kenosha District Election, 1912
Party	Candidate	Votes	%	±%
Republican Primary, September 3, 1912
Republican	Charles H. Pfennig	1,173	72.45%	
Republican	Frank S. Becker	446	27.55%	
Plurality		727	44.90%	
Total votes		1,619	100.0%	
General Election, November 5, 1912
Republican	Charles H. Pfennig	3,184	54.18%	+15.60%
Democratic	Mathias J. Scholey (incumbent)	2,231	37.96%	−13.08%
Socialist	Leonidas L. Hill	462	7.86%	−2.52%
Plurality		953	16.22%	+3.75%
Total votes		5,877	100.0%	+27.37%
Republican gain from Democratic		Swing	28.68%	

Wisconsin State Assembly
Preceded by Mathias J. Scholey	Member of the Wisconsin State Assembly from the Kenosha County district January 1, 1913 – January 1, 1915	Succeeded by Don J. Vincent
Political offices
Preceded by James E. Gorman	Mayor of Kenosha, Wisconsin; April 1902 – April 1904	Succeeded by James E. Gorman
Preceded by Mathias J. Scholey	Mayor of Kenosha, Wisconsin; April 1916 – April 1918	Succeeded by John G. Joachim
Legal offices
Preceded by John H. Veitch	Sheriff of Kenosha County, Wisconsin; January 1, 1907 – January 1, 1909	Succeeded by W. H. Gunter
