= William Bullen (Kenosha pioneer) =

Pioneer settler of Kenosha, Wisconsin

2nd Village President of Southport, Wisconsin
- In office April 1842 – April 1843
- Preceded by: Michael Frank
- Succeeded by: John W. McKoy

President of the Council of the Wisconsin Territory
- In office November 26, 1838 – January 21, 1839
- Preceded by: Arthur B. Ingram
- Succeeded by: James Collins

Member of the Council of the Wisconsin Territory from Racine County
- In office November 5, 1838 – November 7, 1842 Serving with Marshall Strong (1838–1839) & Lorenzo Janes (1840–1842)
- Preceded by: Position established
- Succeeded by: Consider Heath & Peter D. Hugunin

Personal details
- Born: February 24, 1805 Clinton, Oneida County, New York, U.S.
- Died: October 27, 1846 (aged 41) Southport, Wisconsin Territory, U.S.
- Resting place: Green Ridge Cemetery, Kenosha, Wisconsin
- Spouse: Julia Ann Hart (m. 1830–1846)
- Children: Orris Hart Bullen^{(b. 1832; died 1868)}; Mary Gertrude (Emslie)^{(b. 1835; died 1917)}; William Herbert Bullen^{(b. 1843; died 1926)}; Julia Frances Bullen^{(b. 1844; died 1859)}
- Parent: John Bullen Sr. (father)
- Relatives: John Bullen Jr. (brother); Thomas B. Bullene (half-brother); Joseph V. Quarles Jr. (nephew); Winslow Bullen (cousin)

William Bullen (February 24, 1805 – October 27, 1846) was an American merchant and Wisconsin pioneer. He was one of the first American settlers in what is now Kenosha, Wisconsin, and represented Racine County in the Wisconsin Territory's legislative assembly.

== Biography ==
William Bullen was born in Clinton, Oneida County, New York, in 1805, and was raised in New York. In December 1834, he joined a meeting of friends at the home of his brother, John Bullen Jr., in Hannibal, New York, to discuss the prospect of emigrating west to the new territories. A subsequent meeting was held in February 1835, in which the Bullens and others agreed to form the "Western Emigration Company" to fund a project to travel west and purchase land. They sold stock in the company at $10 per share and ultimately raised $4,000—shares became a popular commodity in the area with less wealthy individuals buying stock to obtain a share of the return on the wealth of the new land. This ultimately proved a poor investment, because proceeds could only be returned to investors if the claimed land was later sold, which the settlers had no intention of doing. The end result was that the settlement at Kenosha benefited the Bullens and their close friends at the expense of several hundred investors. The company dissolved in 1837, after settlement was established.

In March 1835, a committee was sent west to explore land for possible settlement on the western shore of Lake Michigan. The committee initially attempted to establish a purchase at the mouth of the Root River—at the site of the present city of Racine, Wisconsin—but were unable to come to terms with the current inhabitants of the area, led by Gilbert Knapp. The company chose to send another expedition under the sole authority of Bullen's brother, John Bullen, Jr., in June 1835—and William Bullen accompanied his brother on this mission. The Bullens settled on a spot just south of the Root River at the mouth of the Pike Creek, and began claiming land.

That same summer, two adventurers, Samuel Resique (or Resseguie) and John Noble, arrived at the settlement intent on making speculative land claims. Finding that Washington Island (now known as "Simmons Island"), in the mouth of the Pike Creek, was not properly marked and claimed, they decided to settle on the island and make their own claim. The island was considered one of the most lucrative pieces of land in the new settlement, and a $7,500 offer already existed to purchase the island if a legitimate claim could be established.

The squatter settlement led to months of tension and skirmishes between the Western Emigration Company and Resique, as both sides employed armed men to menace the other in a conflict remembered as "Resique's War". With an armed band, William Bullen took possession of the western half of the island and built a two-story building there, where he stationed armed guards to protect the claim. He eventually brokered a deal with Resique which allowed them to split ownership of island. Tensions persisted, however—most of the settlers from the Western Emigration Co. became part of a temperance society, Resique used his piece of the island to set up the first tavern in the village.

During the Winter of 1835–1836, the Bullen brothers returned to Oswego County, New York, and purchased a 100-ton schooner—the Martin Van Buren—and loaded it with seeds, provisions, and tools, to return to their settlement. On their return, John went to Chicago and purchased a herd of cattle and drove them north to their claim. With the merchandise, Bullen opened a store in 1836 under the name "William Bullen & Co." It was one of the first four businesses in the settlement and was also the site of the post office for several years.

Most religious services in the settlement were held at the home of William Bullen, on Washington Island, until a schoolhouse was constructed in the Fall of 1837. The inhabitants chose to name their settlement the village of "Southport" in 1837. It was incorporated as the city of Kenosha in 1850.

In 1836, the Wisconsin Territory was formally established from the western remnants of the Michigan Territory. In 1837, Racine County was created comprising all of the present territory of Racine County and Kenosha County. At the first elections held after the creation of Racine County, William Bullen was chosen as one of the county's two representatives on the Council (upper house) in the 2nd Wisconsin Territorial Assembly. He was selected by the members as the president of the council for the first session of that term and was subsequently elected to the 3rd Wisconsin Territorial Assembly. He also served on the Racine County board of supervisors, was the first chairman of the board of supervisors in 1843, and was the 2nd village president of Southport.

William Bullen died in Southport in 1846.

== Personal life and family ==
William Bullen was the son of John Bullen IV—referred to in most contemporaneous documents as "John Bullen Sr." John Bullen IV had served as a captain in the New York militia during the War of 1812. His father, John Bullen III, had served in the Massachusetts militia in the American Revolutionary War and afterwards was involved as a captain in Shays' Rebellion. Bullen and his company settled the area of Clinton, Oneida County, New York, as they fled the suppression of their rebellion.

John Bullen IV followed his sons to their settlement in the Wisconsin Territory in 1837 and operated a tavern in the area now known as Salem Lakes, Wisconsin. He was appointed a brigadier general of the Wisconsin Territory militia by Governor Henry Dodge in 1839. Other children of John Bullen IV also settled in Wisconsin.

William's sister, Caroline Bullen, taught school in Southport and married Joseph Very Quarles Sr. Her eldest son, Joseph Very Quarles Jr., became a United States senator and United States district judge.

Thomas B. Bullene, the 22nd mayor of Kansas City, Missouri, was a half-brother of William Bullen.

William Bullen married Julia Ann Hart on February 24, 1830. Julia was the daughter of Orris Hart, a New York politician and judge who had served several years on the Erie Canal Commission. William and Julia had four children:

- Orris Hart Bullen went to Ottawa, Illinois, and worked as a banker until his death.
- Mary Gertrude Bullen married Peter Emslie, an architect in Buffalo, New York.
- William Herbert Bullen moved to Chicago and prospered there.
- Julia Frances Bullen died at age 15.

After Bullen's death, Julia remarried with George Bennett, who had also been a member of the Western Emigration Company.
