= George Howard Paul =

American journalist and politician (1826–1890)

George H. Paul

Member of the Wisconsin Senate from the 6th district
- In office January 7, 1878 – January 2, 1882
- Preceded by: John L. Mitchell
- Succeeded by: Enoch Chase

5th Mayor of Kenosha, Wisconsin
- In office April 1857 – April 1859
- Preceded by: Volney Hughes
- Succeeded by: Asahel Farr

Personal details
- Born: March 14, 1826 Danville, Vermont
- Died: May 18, 1890 (aged 64) Kansas City, Missouri
- Resting place: Forest Home Cemetery; Milwaukee, Wisconsin
- Party: Democratic
- Spouse: Pamela Susan Joy (m. 1855)
- Children: Katherine (Young); (b. 1860; died 1943)
- Education: University of Vermont

George Howard Paul (March 14, 1826 – May 18, 1890) was an American newspaperman, businessman, and politician. He was a prominent member of the Democratic Party in Wisconsin, served two terms in the Wisconsin State Senate representing southern Milwaukee County, and was the 5th mayor of Kenosha, Wisconsin. He also served in various other state and local offices, including several years as a member and president of the University of Wisconsin Board of Regents.

== Background ==
Paul was born in Danville in Caledonia County, Vermont, on March 14, 1826; graduated from the University of Vermont in 1847; attended Harvard Law School (but did not graduate) and was subsequently admitted to the bar. He worked in newspaper journalism and served as postmaster of Burlington, Vermont, in 1849.

== Move to Wisconsin, and departure ==
Paul had some unsuccessful business ventures and moved to Kenosha, Wisconsin, in 1851 to escape his creditors. He purchased the Kenosha Democrat in 1851, which he published through 1854. During the 1853 session of the Wisconsin Legislature, he was hired as assistant clerk of the state senate under chief clerk John K. Williams. He also held the patronage post of postmaster of Kenosha from 1853 to 1861. In 1856, he was elected Mayor of Kenosha and was re-elected in 1857 and 1858. He also served as a member of the Kenosha County Board of Supervisors in 1857. When the Republicans won the 1860 election, Paul moved briefly to New York City, where he worked for the New York Daily News in 1861 before returning to Wisconsin.

== Move to Milwaukee ==
On his return, he settled in Milwaukee and found a job on the editorial staff of the Milwaukee Daily News. In 1862, with the financial backing of Milwaukee banker Alexander Mitchell, Paul and J. M. Lyon purchased the newspaper. Paul served as editor until 1881, when the News changed hands and became the Daily Republican and News (it would eventually merge into the Milwaukee Sentinel.

Paul became a major figure in Wisconsin politics. He was a delegate to many Democratic National Conventions, served on the Democratic National Committee (1864–1868 and again 1872–1876), and was chairman of the state party executive committee (1872–1874).

== Taylor administration ==
He was the campaign manager for William Robert Taylor's coalition of Democrats, reform Republicans, and Grangers (the "Reform Party"), which secured the election of Taylor as Governor in 1873. A central demand of the Grangers was the passage of a new railroad regulation. Taylor and Paul passed and supported the law—known as the "Potter Law" for its chief sponsor, state senator Robert L. D. Potter—despite strong opposition from Paul's previous financial backer, Alexander Mitchell, who by this time had become a member of congress. Despite Mitchell's opposition, Paul continued to support the Potter Law. He was appointed to the newly created office of Railroad Commissioner, which was granted vast powers by the legislation to regulate freight rates charged by railroads. Paul, however, did come to an accommodation with Mitchell, which ensured his personal, political, and financial future after the defeat of the Reform coalition in the 1875 elections and the subsequent repeal of the Potter Law.

== Education service and Senate terms ==
He was also involved in educational politics and policy. He was a member of the Milwaukee Board of School Commissioners (school board) in 1870, then superintendent of public schools from 1870 to 1871. He was first appointed to the Board of Regents of the University of Wisconsin in February 1874, served as its president from February 1875 through October 1877, and was re-appointed as a regent in 1879. Despite his political activism, he is credited with doing important work to free the institution from political control and securing greater state support for the university.

He was elected as a Democratic and Greenbacker candidate for state senator in 1877 to succeed fellow Democrat John L. Mitchell (Alexander Mitchell's son) in the 6th senatorial district (the 5th, 8th, 11th, and 12th Wards of the city of Milwaukee and the towns of Franklin, Greenfield, Lake, and Oak Creek), with 2464 votes to 1664 for Republican David Vance. He was re-elected senator on November 4, 1879, receiving 2336 votes to 2101 for Republican State Representative David J. Price. He was not a candidate for re-election in 1881 and was succeeded by Democrat Enoch Chase.

== Back to business ==
With Alexander Mitchell's backing, Paul established the Milwaukee Cement Co. in 1875. He was postmaster of Milwaukee from 1885 to 1889 and a member of the city's charter convention in 1887. In 1889, he became involved in disputes with his former associates over Milwaukee Cement, was defeated in a lawsuit, and moved to Kansas City, Missouri, where he died a few months later.
