= Zalmon G. Simmons =

19th century American businessman and politician (1828–1910)

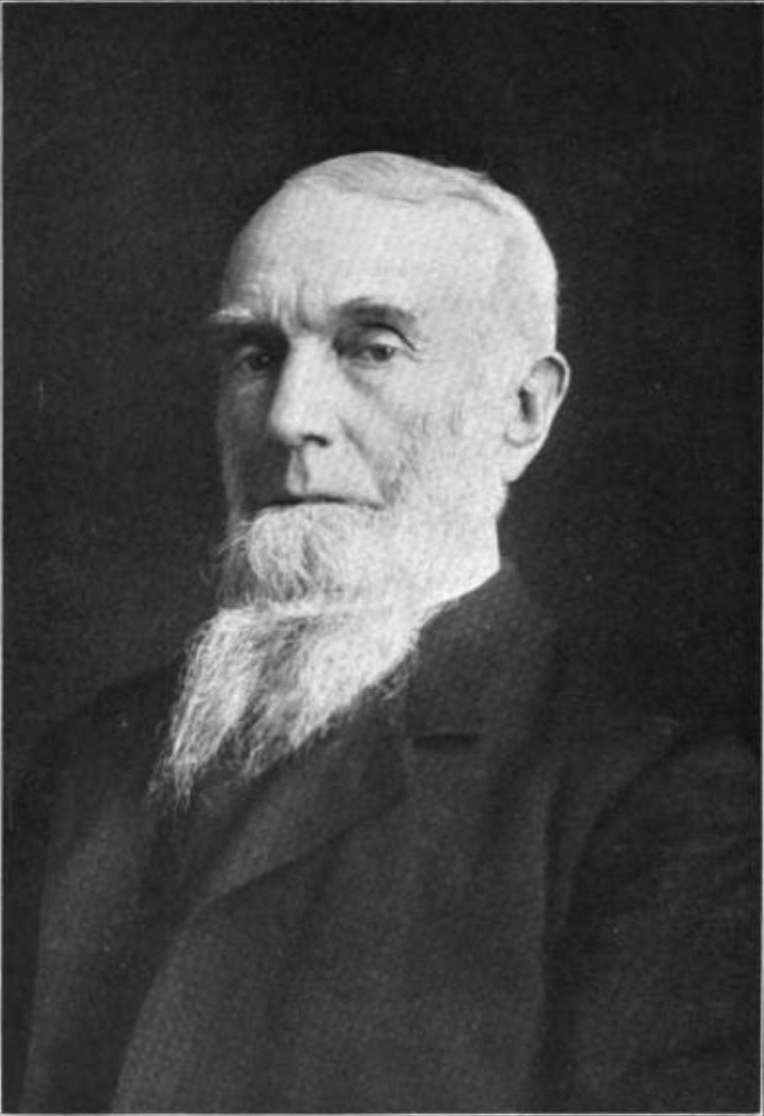

26th Mayor of Kenosha, Wisconsin
- In office April 1884 – April 1886
- Preceded by: O. S. Newell
- Succeeded by: Emory L. Grant

Member of the Wisconsin State Assembly from the Kenosha district
- In office January 1, 1865 – January 1, 1866
- Preceded by: A. Constantine Barry
- Succeeded by: Franklin Newell

Personal details
- Born: Zalmon Gilbert Simmons; September 10, 1828 Euphrates, Montgomery County, New York
- Died: February 11, 1910 (aged 81) Kenosha, Wisconsin
- Resting place: Green Ridge Cemetery, Kenosha, Wisconsin
- Spouses: Emma E. Robeson; (died 1893)
- Children: Gilbert Maurice Simmons^{(b. 1852; died 1890)}; Nelson Landon Simmons^{(b. 1856; died 1859)}; Minnie J. (Towne)^{(b. 1859; died 1930)}; Emma Belle (Lance)^{(b. 1863; died 1930)}; Ezra John Simmons^{(b. 1867; died 1881)}; Zalmon Gilbert Simmons II^{(b. 1870; died 1934)}
- Parents: Ezra Link Marie Simmons (father); Maria (Gilbert) Simmons (mother)
- Occupation: Businessman, politician
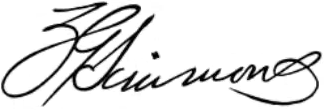
- Signature

Zalmon Gilbert Simmons Sr. (September 10, 1828 – February 11, 1910) was an American businessman, politician, and Wisconsin pioneer. In business, Simmons was initially successful as an investor and officer in the Wisconsin State Telegraph Company, which through acquisitions and mergers later became part of the Western Union Telegraph Company. While working in that business, he founded the Simmons Company. As an investor and philanthropist, he was a major contributor to the early economic and cultural development of the city of Kenosha, Wisconsin. He served as the 26th mayor of Kenosha (1884 & 1885), and represented Kenosha in the Wisconsin State Assembly in the 1865 term. Simmons Island in Kenosha is named for him, the land was formerly part of his estate.

== Early life ==
Born September 10, 1828, to Ezra and Mary Gilbert Simmons in Euphrates, Montgomery County, New York, (Note: His biography in The Telegraph in America: Its Founders, Promoters, and Noted Men states that he was born and from Marcy, Oneida County, New York.) Soon after Zalmon was born, the family moved to Oneida County, New York, and established a farm. After 1839, the family moved to Benton Township, Lake County, Illinois, where Zalmon attended common schools during the winter months. On June 12, 1843, the family moved to Southport (now Kenosha), Wisconsin. Simmons came to Kenosha with US$3 (equivalent to $116 in 2025) when he was 15 or 21 years of age. His brother was Rouse Simmons who also served in the Wisconsin State Assembly for Kenosha. Rouse was a member of the Republican party and served in 1875.

Simmons completed his schooling in Kenosha (Note: Nelke states that Zalmon completed his education in Lake County, Illinois at the age of 18.) and then worked as a teacher between 18 and 21 years of age.

== Business career ==
Among his pursuits, Simmons was the president of the First National Bank of Kenosha, Northwest Telegraphy Company, and the Rock Island Railway Company. In 1859, he was the president of the Kenosha and Rockford Railway Company, while also working at the Wisconsin State Telegraph Company.

=== Merchant ===
Beginning at the age of 21, Simmons worked as a general store clerk for pioneer Seth Doan for $200 (equivalent to $7,740 in 2025) per year. Due to Mr. Doan's ill health, Simmons ran the store after six months employment. He bought the store after working there 16 or 18 months. He ran the store successfully for 12 years, until he sought other interests.

=== Telegraph ===
Simmons acquired half interest in the Wisconsin State Telegraph Company in 1856, became a director, and in December 1858 became its secretary and treasurer. In 1864, he was made president. The company became the North-West Telegraphy company when it merged with the Minnesota State Telegraph Company in 1865. Simmons was elected president of the new company. He remained president until 1881, when the company leased its lines to the Western Union Telegraph Company. At the time that Simmons invested in the company, it was almost worthless and had service only between Milwaukee and Madison. Simmons extended service into remote areas, with lines established through nearly impenetrable swamps and forests.

Simmons was on the board of directors of the Western Union Telegraph Company. Simmons designed a wooden telegraph insulator and on April 16, 1871, purchased a cheesebox factory that became the Simmons Manufacturing Company to manufacture the insulators.

=== Simmons Bedding Company ===
One of his general store customers paid for merchandise with a patent for a woven wire bedspring. At that time, mattresses were made of cotton or horsehair. Simmons took the ideas from the patent and found a way to make the cost of manufacturing affordable. In 1870, Simmons founded what would become the Simmons Bedding Company, but the market had not yet developed for spring beds. Instead, Simmons manufactured brass beds that were sold domestically and internationally. The Northwestern Wire Mattress Company was incorporated in 1884 and in 1889 the name was changed to Simmons Manufacturing Company. In 1925, Simmons produced the Beautyrest mattress, for which the company is best known. It was sold at three to four times the cost of wire mattresses at the time for $39.50 (equivalent to $725 in 2025) and four years later had sold more than $9 million (equivalent to $168,750,000 in 2025) of the mattresses. The company introduced the pull-out bed, Hide-a-Bed, in 1940. By 1941, the company made springs, mattresses, steel beds and furniture and employed about 2,500 men. During World War II, it produced 2,700 different products needed to support the war effort.

=== Manitou and Pike's Peak Railway ===
Simmons surveyed the Englemann Canyon for telegraph lines to Pikes Peak in Colorado. He was instrumental in stringing telegraph lines alongside railroads and had earlier purchased a fifty percent interest in a telegraph company. After a miserable two-day trip to the top of the mountain on a mule, he thought that there should be a more comfortable and "civilized" way to make the trip. He got the idea of a train from the owner of a hotel where he was staying. Simmons then financed the building of the Manitou and Pike's Peak Railway in 1889. The railway itself was built by Italian laborers and was operational by 1891. It can still be ridden to the top.

== Political career ==
In 1865, Simmons served as the representative of Kenosha County in the Wisconsin State Assembly, serving as a member of the National Union Party.

He later served as mayor of Kenosha, Wisconsin, from 1884 to 1886, during which time he refunded its debt of $1.75 million (equivalent to $62,708,333 in 2025).

== Personal life ==
Simmons married Emma E. Robeson from Lake County, Illinois on April 20, 1850, in Kenosha, Wisconsin. Emma was the daughter of Captain Morris Robeson. Their children were Minnie, Emma, Gilbert, Zalmon and two sons who died during their childhood, Nelson who died at three years of age and Ezra who died when he was 13. Emma and Zalmon were Unitarians.

He built the Gilbert M. Simmons Memorial Library and donated it to the city of Kenosha in memory of his son who had died in 1890. The building, dedicated on May 30, 1900, is listed on the National Register of Historic Places.

Emma died on October 11, 1899. Simmons died on February 11, 1910, in Kenosha, and his son, Zalmon Simmons, Jr. took over the Simmons Manufacturing Company.

== See also ==
- List of mayors of Kenosha, Wisconsin

== Notes ==
Political offices
Preceded by O. S. Newell	Mayor of Kenosha, Wisconsin; 1884 – 1886	Succeeded by Emory L. Grant
