= Asahel Farr =

American doctor and pioneer (1820 – 1887)

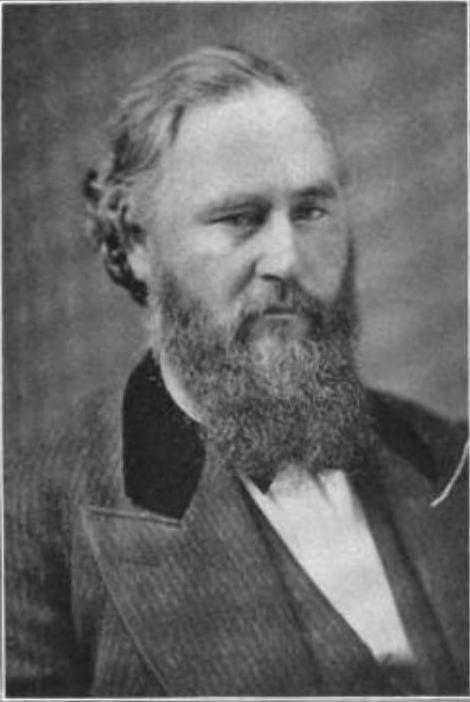

Member of the Wisconsin Senate from the 8th district
- In office January 1, 1876 – January 1, 1878
- Preceded by: Thompson Weeks
- Succeeded by: Benoni Reynolds

Member of the Wisconsin State Assembly from the Kenosha district
- In office January 1, 1873 – January 1, 1874
- Preceded by: Frederick Robinson
- Succeeded by: Robert S. Houston

6th, 10th, 17th, and 21st Mayor of Kenosha, Wisconsin
- In office April 1877 – April 1879
- Preceded by: Joseph V. Quarles
- Succeeded by: Frederick Robinson
- In office April 1871 – April 1874
- Preceded by: Milton Pettit
- Succeeded by: Isaac W. Webster
- In office April 1864 – April 1865
- Preceded by: Frederick Robinson
- Succeeded by: Milton Pettit
- In office April 1859 – April 1860
- Preceded by: George Howard Paul
- Succeeded by: Isaac W. Webster

President of the Kenosha School Board
- In office April 1871 – April 1874
- Preceded by: E. P. Lewis
- Succeeded by: Volney French

Personal details
- Born: Asahel Farr; October 10, 1820 Waterford, Vermont
- Died: June 13, 1887 (aged 66) Kenosha, Wisconsin
- Party: Republican; Democratic (before 1861)
- Spouses: Martha Jackson Wheeler; (m. c.1847; died 1878); Emma Marr Durfee
- Children: Dr. Albert L. Farr^{(b. 1849; died 1920)}; Dr. William Mattocks Farr^{(b. 1853; died 1922)}; Martha Wheeler (Nutting)^{(b. 1862)}
- Parents: Alpheus Farr (father); Sybil Farr (mother)
- Education: Dartmouth College
- Profession: surgeon

Asahel Farr (October 10, 1820 – June 13, 1887) was an American surgeon and Wisconsin pioneer. He was a member of the Wisconsin State Assembly and the Wisconsin State Senate, and was Mayor of Kenosha, Wisconsin, for seven years between 1859 and 1879. He died on June 13, 1887

== Biography ==
Farr was born on October 10, 1820, in Waterford, Vermont. He attended the common schools and then taught school to raise money to enter Dartmouth College. He graduated from the medical department of Dartmouth College in 1846 and commenced practice as a doctor and surgeon in St. Johnsbury, Vermont. He moved to Peacham, Vermont, in 1847, where he married Martha Jackson Wheeler and where his father died in 1852. He then moved to Kenosha, Wisconsin, in 1854, with his wife and son.

In addition to his work in medicine, he served on the Kenosha school board and was president of the school board from 1871 to 1874. He was elected to his first one-year term as Mayor in 1859, then again in 1864, 1871, 1872, 1873, 1877, and 1878. Farr was a member of the Assembly in 1873 and represented the 8th district of the Senate (at the time Kenosha and Walworth counties) from 1876 to 1877. Politically, he was a Democrat until the outbreak of the American Civil War. At that time, he became a Republican and remained with that party for the rest of his life.

== Personal life and family ==
Farr married Martha Jackson Wheeler of Vermont and together they had three children. Albert and William both became doctors like their father, and Martha married Colonel James R. Nutting. His wife died in 1878 and he remarried to Emma Marr Durfee of Waukegan, Illinois.

Farr's parents, Alpheus and Sybil Farr, appear to be cousins, both descended from George Farr, a shipbuilder who came to the colonies from England.

== Electoral history ==
=== Wisconsin Assembly (1872) ===
Wisconsin Assembly, Kenosha District Election, 1872
Party	Candidate	Votes	%	±%
General Election, November 5, 1872
Republican	Asahel Farr	1,390	52.67%	
Democratic	Frederick Robinson (incumbent)	1,249	47.33%	
Total votes		'2,639'	'100.0%'	
Republican gain from Democratic				

=== Wisconsin Senate (1875) ===
Wisconsin Senate, 8th District Election, 1875
Party	Candidate	Votes	%	±%
General Election, November 2, 1875
Republican	Asahel Farr	4,152	65.70%	
Reform	U. S. Hollister	2,168	34.30%	
Total votes		'6,320'	'100.0%'	
Republican hold				

== See also ==
- The Political Graveyard

Wisconsin State Assembly
Preceded by Frederick Robinson	Member of the Wisconsin State Assembly from the Kenosha district January 1, 1873 – January 1, 1874	Succeeded by Robert S. Houston
Wisconsin Senate
Preceded by Thompson Weeks	Member of the Wisconsin Senate from the 8th district January 1, 1876 – January 1, 1878	Succeeded by Benoni Reynolds
Political offices
Preceded by George Howard Paul	Mayor of Kenosha, Wisconsin; 1859 – 1860	Succeeded by Isaac W. Webster
Preceded by Frederick Robinson	Mayor of Kenosha, Wisconsin; 1864 – 1865	Succeeded by Milton Pettit
Preceded by Milton Pettit	Mayor of Kenosha, Wisconsin; 1871 – 1874	Succeeded by Isaac W. Webster
Preceded by Joseph V. Quarles	Mayor of Kenosha, Wisconsin; 1877 – 1879	Succeeded by Frederick Robinson
