= Malcolm D. Farr =

American politician and businessman

Malcolm Douglas Farr (March 24, 1884 – April 28, 1956) was an American businessman and politician.

Farr was born in Kenosha, Wisconsin. He went to the Kenosha public schools and to the Northwestern Military Academy. He was the president of the Independent Ice Company and the Sunshine Coal Company. Farr served in the Wisconsin Assembly in 1921 and 1922 as a Republican. He then moved to Phoenix, Arizona and was the chief executive of a pipe manufacturing company. In 1946, Farr moved to Costa Mesa, California where he died.
