= Benoni Reynolds =

American politician

Benoni Orrin Reynolds II (July 26, 1824 – January 19, 1911) was a member of the Wisconsin State Assembly and the Wisconsin State Senate.

== Biography ==
Reynolds was born on July 26, 1824, in Sempronius, New York. In 1848 he married Mary Jane Smith, one of Wisconsin's first female physicians. He graduated from Rush Medical College in 1851, and moved to Elkhorn, Wisconsin in 1854. During the American Civil War, Reynolds was a surgeon with the 3rd Wisconsin Volunteer Cavalry Regiment of the Union Army. Reynolds died on January 19, 1911, in Lake Geneva, Wisconsin.

== Political career ==
Reynolds was a member of the Assembly in 1876 and of the Senate from 1878 to 1879. Additionally, he was Mayor of Geneva, Wisconsin, from 1874 to 1876. He was a Republican.
