= Frederick Robinson (Wisconsin pharmacist) =

9th, 15th, and 22nd Mayor of Kenosha, Wisconsin

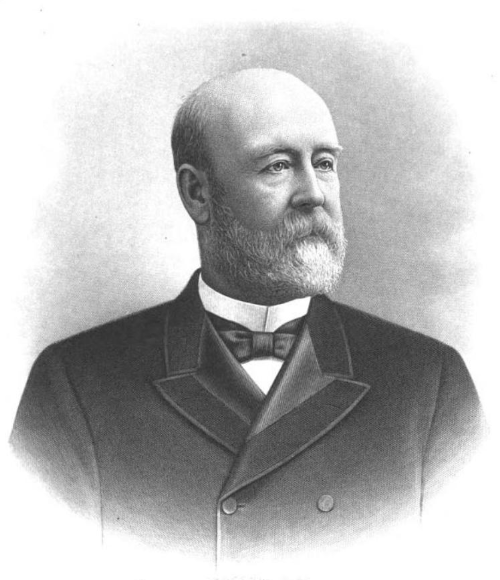

9th, 15th, and 22nd Mayor of Kenosha, Wisconsin
- In office April 1879 – April 1880
- Preceded by: Asahel Farr
- Succeeded by: A. C. Sinclair
- In office April 1869 – April 1870
- Preceded by: Isaac W. Webster
- Succeeded by: Milton Pettit
- In office April 1862 – April 1864
- Preceded by: Milton Pettit
- Succeeded by: Asahel Farr

Member of the Wisconsin State Assembly from the Kenosha district
- In office January 1, 1876 – January 1, 1877
- Preceded by: Rouse Simmons
- Succeeded by: Walter S. Maxwell
- In office January 1, 1872 – January 1, 1873
- Preceded by: Jonas W. Rhodes
- Succeeded by: Asahel Farr

Chairman of the Kenosha County Board of Supervisors
- In office 1868–1869

Member of the Kenosha City Council
- In office April 1868 – April 1869
- In office April 1858 – April 1859
- In office April 1852 – April 1853

Personal details
- Born: Frederick Robinson; March 11, 1824 Church Stretton, UK
- Died: April 11, 1893 (aged 69)
- Party: Democratic
- Spouses: Ann Maria Bertholf; (m. 1852)
- Children: Alma (Pettit)^{(b. 1854; died 1915)}; Richard T. Robinson; Ida Robinson; Emma Robinson; Frederick Robinson; Louise Robinson; Harry Robinson
- Profession: chemist, farmer, politician

Frederick Robinson (March 11, 1824 – April 11, 1893) was a British American immigrant, pharmacist, businessman, and politician. He served four terms as Mayor of Kenosha, Wisconsin, and served in the Wisconsin State Assembly.

== Biography ==
Robinson was born on March 11, 1824, in Church Stretton, in the West Midlands region of England. He was the youngest of nine children and his father died when he was only two years old. At age 15 he became an apprentice to a druggist and learned under him for five years.

In 1845, he emigrated by boat to America. He landed in New York City after a forty day trip and was soon employed at a drug store in that city. The following year, he moved to Chicago and took a job with Sidney Sawyer. Sawyer wanted to establish a drug store in the city of Southport in the Wisconsin Territory (present day Kenosha, Wisconsin) and sent Robinson there to set up and run the store. For the next four decades, Robinson would be the leading druggist in the city. Later in life, he would invest in other businesses in the area, and would serve as president of the First Bank of Kenosha and the M. H. Pettit Malting Company. In addition to his business interests, he was a farmer, a member of the Knights Templar, and the Independent Order of Odd Fellows.

On October 3, 1852, Robinson married Ann M. Bertholf in Green Bay, Wisconsin. Frederick and Ann had seven children. Their eldest daughter, Alma, married Ossian Marsh Pettit, the eldest son of fellow Kenosha Mayor, Milton Pettit. Frederick Robinson died on April 11, 1893.

== Public career ==
Robinson was elected to represent Kenosha County in the Wisconsin State Assembly during the 1872 and 1876 sessions. He was elected to one-year terms as Mayor of Kenosha in 1862, 1863, 1869, and 1879. He also served as a member of the Kenosha city council, a member of the school board, chairman of the Kenosha County Board of Supervisors, and Chief Engineer of the Kenosha Volunteer Fire Company. He was a Democrat.

He was instrumental in the passage of the 1882 Wisconsin Pharmacy Act (1882 Wisconsin Act 167), which established the State Board of Pharmacy to regulate the industry in the state, and was a member of the board until his death. He also successfully advocated for adding a department of pharmacy to the University of Wisconsin.

== Electoral history ==
Wisconsin Assembly, Kenosha District Election, 1871
Party	Candidate	Votes	%	±%
General Election, November 6, 1871
Democratic	Frederick Robinson	1,148	58.78%	
Republican	I. L. Johnson	805	41.22%	
Total votes		'1,953'	'100.0%'	
Democratic gain from Independent				

Wisconsin Assembly, Kenosha District Election, 1875
Party	Candidate	Votes	%	±%
General Election, November 2, 1875
Democratic	Frederick Robinson	1,202	54.00%	
Republican	S. W. Maxwell	1,024	46.00%	
Total votes		'2,226'	'100.0%'	
Democratic gain from Republican				
