= Eugene Dorff =

Wisconsin politician

Interim Mayor of Kenosha
- In office June 15, 1987 – April 19, 1988
- Preceded by: John D. Bilotti
- Succeeded by: Patrick E. Moran

Member of the Wisconsin State Assembly
- In office January 1, 1973 – January 3, 1983
- Preceded by: District established
- Succeeded by: Joanne Huelsman
- Constituency: 65th district
- In office January 4, 1971 – January 1, 1973
- Preceded by: Russell A. Olson
- Succeeded by: District abolished
- Constituency: Kenosha 2nd district

Personal details
- Born: February 25, 1930 Kenosha, Wisconsin
- Died: September 7, 2005 (aged 75) Mesa, Arizona
- Cause of death: Cancer
- Resting place: Green Ridge Cemetery; Kenosha, Wisconsin
- Spouse: Donna Lupi (m. 1948)
- Children: Donald Dorff; Gerald Dorff; Allan Dorff

Military service
- Allegiance: United States
- Branch/service: United States Navy; U.S. Navy Reserve
- Years of service: 1947–1962

Eugene Joseph Dorff (February 25, 1930 – September 7, 2005) was an American politician from Wisconsin. A member of the Democratic Party, he represented Kenosha in the Wisconsin State Assembly for twelve years and served as interim mayor of Kenosha for nearly a year, following the resignation of mayor John D. Bilotti.

== Early life and career ==
Born in Kenosha, Wisconsin, Dorff graduated from Mary D. Bradford High School, where he met his future wife, Donna. While in high school, Dorff enlisted with the United States Navy Reserve and remained in the service until 1962.

== Career ==
After graduating from high school, Dorff worked as a sheet metal worker before becoming a supervisor in the facilities and equipment department of the American Motors Corporation plant in Kenosha. He served three terms on the Kenosha Common Council from 1964 until 1970, but did not run for a fourth term in 1970.

=== Wisconsin Assembly ===
Dorff made his first bid for Wisconsin State Assembly in 1968. Kenosha County, in 1968, was divided into two assembly districts: the 1st, which only contained wards of the city of the Kenosha; and the 2nd, which contained the remaining southern city wards plus the rest of Kenosha County. Dorff resided in one of the city wards belonging to the vast 2nd district. He narrowly won the Democratic Primary in September, but fell far short of defeating the incumbent, Republican Russell A. Olson of Randall, in the general election.

In 1970, Dorff tried again, running as a fiscal moderate and favoring property tax relief for homeowners. Dorff also made an issue of the Legislature's bi-annual sessions, suggesting that the state would be better-run if they returned to annual sessions. The Sterling Hall bombing on the University of Wisconsin–Madison campus became a significant issue in the fall. Dorff again turned that issue back to a critique of the incumbent, saying the Governor should have called a special session of the Legislature to deal with the issue. On election day, Dorff eked past Olson, taking 52% of the vote in a Democratic wave year in the state.

During a special session in 1972, the Legislature passed a significant new redistricting law, which ended the practice of allocating assembly districts to counties, and instead allowed for districts to be drawn across county boundaries. Dorff now resided in the 65th assembly district, composed of just the southern part of the city of Kenosha and the neighboring town of Pleasant Prairie. After redistricting, Dorff went on to win re-election five times in his new district with relative ease before retiring at the end of his sixth term.

During his time in the Assembly, he served on the committees for Labor (1971–1974 & 1979–1980), Transportation (1971–1974 & 1977–1978 & 1981–1982), Veterans and Military Affairs (1975–1976), Insurance and Banking (1975–1978), Financial Institutions (1979–1980), Consumer and Commercial Credit (1981–1982), and was chairman of the committee on Excise and Fees from 1975 until the end of his assembly career.

=== Mayor of Kenosha ===
Dorff returned to local politics in 1984, unseating incumbent alderman Jesse Kolmos in the April 1984 city election. He went on to win another term in 1986. In 1987, when Kenosha mayor John D. Bilotti resigned to accept an appointment in the Wisconsin Department of Revenue, the City Council elected Dorff to act as interim mayor until the 1988 election.

Dorff decided to run for a full term as mayor in 1988. He survived a crowded six-person primary, but was defeated in the head-to-head general election by freshman alderman Patrick Moran. Following his defeat in the mayoral election, Dorff was elected to one final term on the Kenosha Common Council in 1990. He did not seek re-election in 1992.

Later in life, Dorff moved to Mesa, Arizona, where he died of cancer in 2005.

== Personal life ==
Eugene Dorff married Donna Lupi on November 26, 1948, shortly after graduating from high school. They had three sons.

== Electoral history ==
=== Wisconsin Assembly (1968, 1970) ===
Wisconsin Assembly, Kenosha 2nd District Election, 1968
| Party | Candidate | Votes | % | ±% |
|---|---|---|---|---|
Democratic Primary, September 10, 1968
| Democratic | Eugene Dorff | 1,933 | 42.22% | |
| Democratic | Julius Goldstein | 1,814 | 39.62% | |
| Democratic | William C. Cress | 831 | 18.15% | |
| Plurality | | 119 | 2.60% | |
| Total votes | | 4,578 | 100.0% | |
General Election, November 5, 1968
| Republican | Russell A. Olson (incumbent) | 12,313 | 56.49% | +1.87% |
| Democratic | Eugene Dorff | 9,217 | 42.29% | −3.08% |
| Independent | Joseph Cundari | 265 | 1.22% | |
| Plurality | | 3,096 | 14.21% | +4.95% |
| Total votes | | 21,795 | 100.0% | +28.55% |
| Republican hold | | | | |

Wisconsin Assembly, Kenosha 2nd District Election, 1970
| Party | Candidate | Votes | % | ±% |
|---|---|---|---|---|
Democratic Primary, September 8, 1970
| Democratic | Eugene Dorff | 3,973 | 71.44% | |
| Democratic | Joseph Cundari | 1,588 | 28.56% | |
| Plurality | | 2,385 | 42.89% | |
| Total votes | | 5,561 | 100.0% | |
General Election, November 3, 1970
| Democratic | Eugene Dorff | 9,305 | 52.59% | |
| Republican | Russell A. Olson (incumbent) | 8,389 | 47.41% | |
| Plurality | | 916 | 5.18% | -9.03% |
| Total votes | | 17,694 | 100.0% | -18.82% |
| Democratic gain from Republican | | Swing | 19.38% | |

=== Wisconsin Assembly (1972–1980) ===
Wisconsin Assembly, 65th District Election, 1972
| Party | Candidate | Votes | % | ±% |
|---|---|---|---|---|
General Election, November 3, 1972
| Democratic | Eugene Dorff | 10,808 | 66.91% | |
| Republican | Arnold J. Esser | 5,345 | 33.09% | |
| Plurality | | 5,463 | 33.82% | |
| Total votes | | 16,153 | 100.0% | |
| Democratic win (new seat) | | | | |

=== Kenosha Mayor (1988) ===
Kenosha Mayoral Election, 1988
| Party | Candidate | Votes | % | ±% |
|---|---|---|---|---|
Nonpartisan Primary, February 16, 1988
| Nonpartisan | Patrick Moran | 5,377 | 42.77% | |
| Nonpartisan | Eugene Dorff (incumbent) | 4,602 | 36.61% | |
| Nonpartisan | Michael Stancato | 1,920 | 15.27% | |
| Nonpartisan | Jeffrey Wolkomir | 401 | 3.19% | |
| Nonpartisan | Henry S. Kanecki | 145 | 1.15% | |
| Nonpartisan | Michael Rasmussen | 127 | 1.01% | |
| Total votes | | 12,572 | 100.0% | |
General Election, April 5, 1988
| Nonpartisan | Patrick Moran | 12,979 | 55.12% | |
| Nonpartisan | Eugene Dorff (incumbent) | 10,566 | 44.88% | |
| Plurality | | 2,413 | 10.25% | |
| Total votes | | 23,545 | 100.0% | |

Wisconsin State Assembly
| Preceded by Russell A. Olson | Member of the Wisconsin State Assembly from the Kenosha 2nd district January 4, 1971 – January 1, 1973 | District abolished |
| New district | Member of the Wisconsin State Assembly from the 65th district January 1, 1973 – January 3, 1983 | Succeeded by Joanne Huelsman |
Political offices
| Preceded by John D. Bilotti | Mayor of Kenosha, Wisconsin (interim); June 15, 1987 – April 19, 1988 | Succeeded by Patrick E. Moran |
