= Milton Pettit =

American politician (1835 – 1873)

Milton H. Pettit
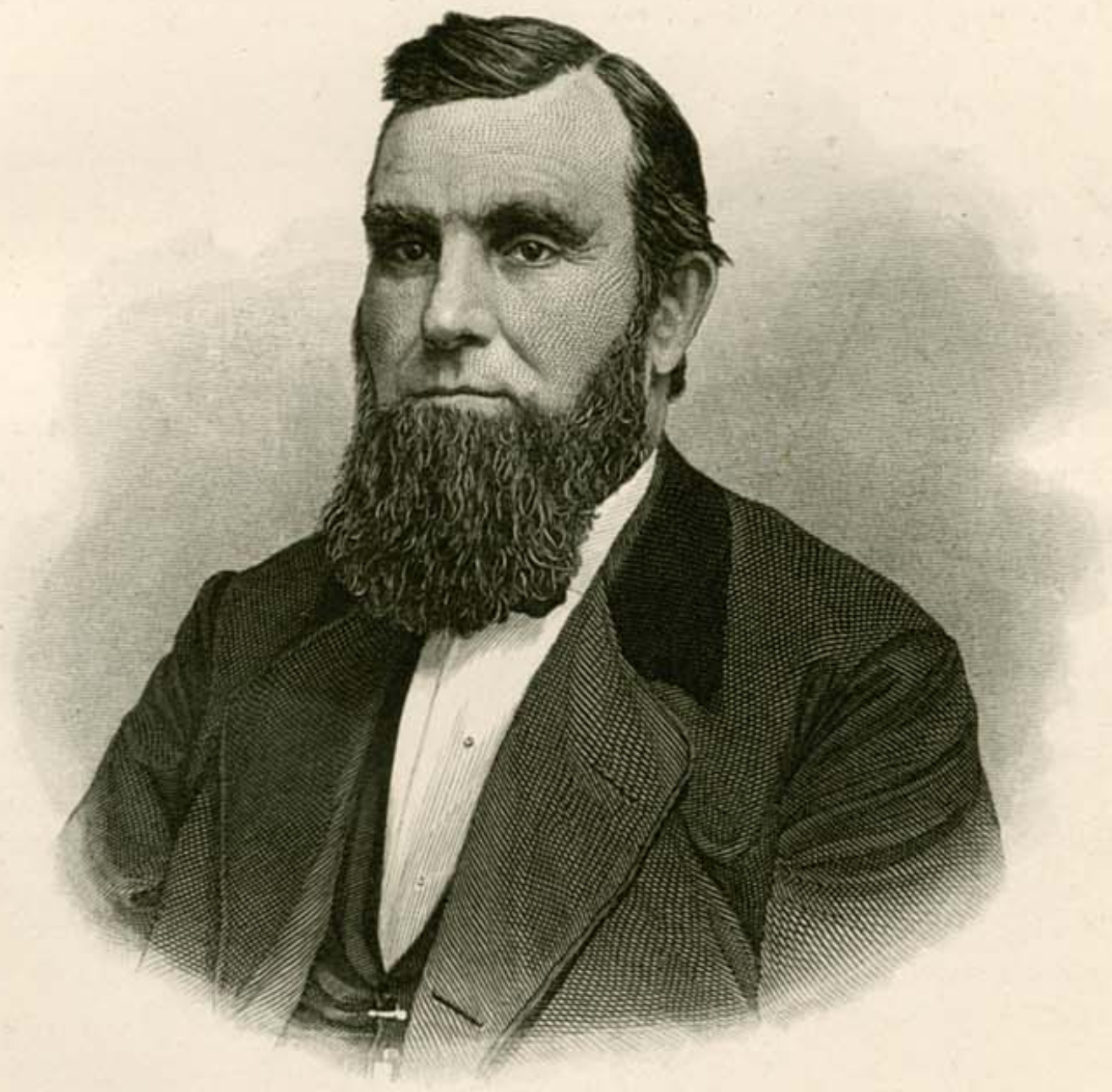

11th Lieutenant Governor of Wisconsin
- In office January 1, 1872 – March 23, 1873
- Governor: Cadwallader C. Washburn
- Preceded by: Thaddeus C. Pound
- Succeeded by: Charles D. Parker (1874)

Member of the Wisconsin Senate from the 8th district
- In office January 1, 1870 – January 1, 1872
- Preceded by: Anthony Van Wyck
- Succeeded by: Samuel Pratt

8th, 11th, 13th, and 16th Mayor of Kenosha, Wisconsin
- In office April 1870 – April 1871
- Preceded by: Frederick Robinson
- Succeeded by: Asahel Farr
- In office April 1867 – April 1868
- Preceded by: Dennis J. Hynes
- Succeeded by: Isaac W. Webster
- In office April 1865 – April 1866
- Preceded by: Asahel Farr
- Succeeded by: Dennis J. Hynes
- In office April 1861 – April 1862
- Preceded by: Isaac W. Webster
- Succeeded by: Frederick Robinson

Member of the Kenosha City Council
- In office April 1864 – April 1865
- In office April 1859 – April 1860

Personal details
- Born: Milton Howard Pettit; October 22, 1825 Fabius, New York, US
- Died: March 23, 1873 (aged 47)
- Resting place: Green Ridge Cemetery, Kenosha, Wisconsin
- Party: Republican
- Spouses: Caroline Diana Marsh; (m. 1847; died 1902)
- Children: Ossian Marsh Pettit^{(b. 1854; died 1906)}; Elizabeth Augusta (Mailer)^{(b. 1857; died 1934)}; Caroline Julia (Griswold)^{(b. 1870; died 1934)}
- Parents: George Pettit (father); Jane (Upfold) Pettit (mother)
- Profession: lawyer, politician

Milton Howard Pettit (October 22, 1835 – March 23, 1873) was an American businessman, Republican politician, and Wisconsin pioneer. He was the 11th lieutenant governor of Wisconsin, during the governorship of Cadwallader C. Washburn, and died while in office. Earlier, he had been mayor of Kenosha, Wisconsin, and had represented Kenosha in the Wisconsin State Senate.

== Biography ==
He was born in Fabius, New York, in 1835, but moved to Somers, Wisconsin Territory, at the age of 11. As an adult, in 1854, he moved to the neighboring city of Kenosha, Wisconsin, and became a member of the Republican Party. In 1859 he was elected to the city council and, in 1861, he was elected to his first term as Mayor of Kenosha. He would be elected to three more one-year terms as Mayor, in 1865, 1867, and 1870, and was elected to represent Kenosha County in the Wisconsin State Senate for the 1870 and 1871 sessions of the Wisconsin Legislature. In 1871, he was the Republican nominee for Lieutenant Governor, and won election, along with Republican gubernatorial nominee Cadwallader Washburn. Shortly after taking office in 1872, however, his health began to fail, and he died in the spring of 1873. He was the second Lieutenant Governor of Wisconsin to die in office, after Timothy Burns.

== Electoral history ==
=== Wisconsin Senate (1869) ===
Wisconsin Senate, 8th District Election, 1869
| Party | Candidate | Votes | % | ±% |
|---|---|---|---|---|
General Election, November 2, 1869
| Republican | Milton H. Pettit | 1,172 | 59.22% | |
| Democratic | James M. Wilber | 807 | 40.78% | |
| Total votes | | 1,979 | 100.0% | |
| Republican hold | | | | |

=== Wisconsin Lieutenant Governor (1871) ===
Wisconsin Lieutenant Gubernatorial Election, 1871
| Party | Candidate | Votes | % | ±% |
|---|---|---|---|---|
General Election, November 7, 1871
| Republican | Milton H. Pettit | 77,751 | 53.05% | |
| Democratic | John A. Rice | 68,807 | 46.95% | |
| Total votes | | 146,558 | 100.0% | |
| Republican hold | | | | |

Party political offices
| Preceded by Thaddeus C. Pound | Republican nominee for Lieutenant Governor of Wisconsin; 1871 | Succeeded by Robert Hall Baker |
Wisconsin Senate
| Preceded by Anthony Van Wyck | Member of the Wisconsin Senate from the 8th district January 1, 1870 – January 1, 1872 | Succeeded by Samuel Pratt |
Political offices
| Preceded by Isaac W. Webster | Mayor of Kenosha, Wisconsin; 1861 – 1862 | Succeeded by Frederick Robinson |
| Preceded by Asahel Farr | Mayor of Kenosha, Wisconsin; 1865 – 1866 | Succeeded by Dennis J. Hynes |
| Preceded by Dennis J. Hynes | Mayor of Kenosha, Wisconsin; 1867 – 1868 | Succeeded by Isaac W. Webster |
| Preceded by Frederick Robinson | Mayor of Kenosha, Wisconsin; 1870 – 1871 | Succeeded by Asahel Farr |
| Preceded by Thaddeus C. Pound | Lieutenant Governor of Wisconsin; 1872 – 1873 | Succeeded by Charles D. Parker |
