= Michael Frank =

1st Mayor of Kenosha, Wisconsin

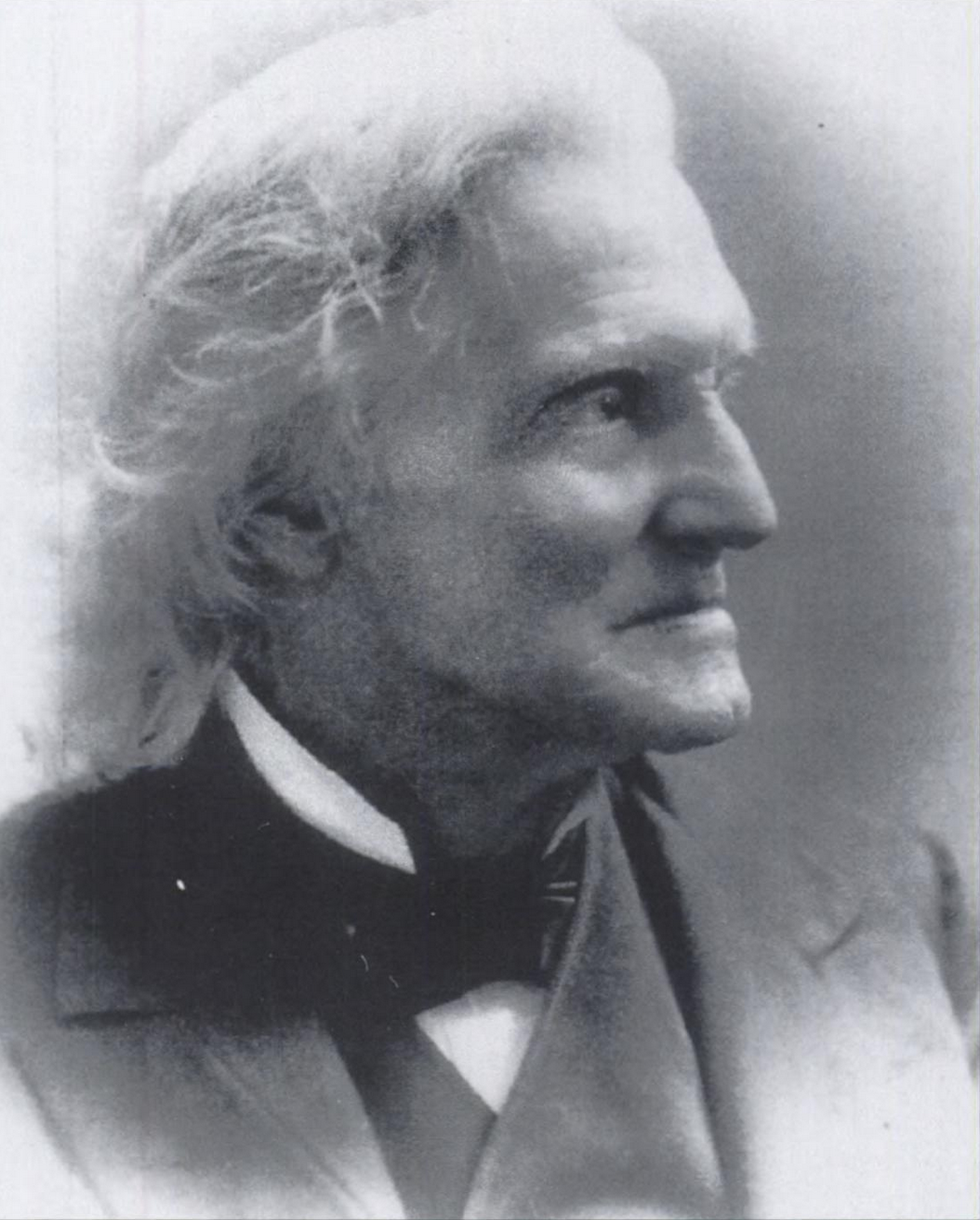

1st Mayor of Kenosha, Wisconsin
- In office April 5, 1850 – April 1851
- Preceded by: Position Established
- Succeeded by: David C. Gaskill

Member of the Wisconsin State Assembly from the Kenosha 1st district
- In office January 1, 1861 – January 1, 1862
- Preceded by: Meredith Howland
- Succeeded by: Reuben L. Bassett

1st Village President of Southport, Wisconsin
- In office February 9, 1841 – April 1842
- Preceded by: Position Established
- Succeeded by: William Bullen

Member of the Council of the Wisconsin Territory from Racine County
- In office December 4, 1843 – January 4, 1847 Serving with Marshall Strong
- Preceded by: Consider Heath; Peter D. Hugunin
- Succeeded by: Frederick S. Lovell

Personal details
- Born: Michael Frank; December 12, 1804 Virgil, New York
- Died: December 26, 1894 (aged 90) Kenosha, Wisconsin
- Resting place: Green Ridge Cemetery; Kenosha, Wisconsin
- Party: Republican; Free Soil (before 1855)
- Spouses: Caroline J. Carpenter; (m. 1837)
- Parent: John M. Frank (father)
- Occupation: newspaperman, politician

Military service
- Allegiance: United States
- Branch/service: Wisconsin Territory militia
- Years of service: 1840–1842
- Rank: Colonel
- Commands: 4th Reg. Wis. Militia
- Battles/wars: none

Michael Frank (December 12, 1804 – December 26, 1894) was a German American pioneer, newspaper editor, and politician. He was the first Mayor of Kenosha, Wisconsin, and is regarded as the father of Wisconsin public schools.

== Early life ==
Michael Frank was born in Virgil, New York, his father, John Frank, was an immigrant from the Principality of Brunswick-Wolfenbüttel, in modern day western Germany. He came to America for economic opportunity, but arrived in the midst of the American Revolutionary War and decided to join the rebel cause. At the end of the war he was granted an honorable discharge and received a grant of land. Through toil, he transformed the wild land into a farm where Michael was raised.

From an early age he developed an interest in reading and study. He consumed books and newspapers, and was eager to engage in conversation about public affairs. He became interested in social reform movements as a young man and was involved with the temperance and abolitionist movements while living in New York. At the time, abolitionism was seen as a fringe ideology and the few abolitionist papers in the country were denounced by the major parties and their publications. Nevertheless, Frank subscribed to the abolitionist paper the Emancipator, but his postmaster refused to deliver it until he pledged not to distribute it further.

== Wisconsin ==
He moved to Southport, Wisconsin Territory, (now Kenosha, Wisconsin) with his wife, Caroline, in October 1839. Here he sought to continue his social causes. A few months after his arrival he organized a lyceum which became influential in the young settlement. He also resumed his interest in the Temperance movement, participating in the first temperance convention in the territory and drafting an address for the Wisconsin Enquirer to advocate the temperance issue.

In January 1840 he met Christopher Latham Sholes, and, in June of that year, they partnered to publish and co-edit the Southport Telegraph. The paper was continuously published for many years, supported the temperance, free soil, and anti-slavery movements. Frank then founded the first literary magazine in Wisconsin in 1843: The Garland of the West.

He was active in encouraging literary and lecture interests in Kenosha. In 1860 he hosted a number of prominent lecturers, including Horace Greeley, Frederick Douglass, and John P. Hale.

Frank was commissioned Colonel of the 4th regiment of Wisconsin militia by Governor Henry Dodge in 1840. The title "Colonel" stuck with Mr. Frank for the rest of his life, though he did little actual work with the militia.

== Territorial legislature ==
When Southport was organized as a village, Frank was elected the first Village President, in 1840. He was elected to represent Racine County (which, at the time, included all of present day Kenosha County) on the Wisconsin Territorial Council. In the Council, he advocated for moving Wisconsin toward statehood, and wrote the first report for the territory to advocate a statehood plan. There was, at the time, still some resistance to statehood as it would mean taking on expenses that were currently being covered by federal dollars.

Perhaps the issue he is best known for was his act passed during the 1845 session, after several earlier attempts, to establish a free public school in Southport. He had begun advocating for the concept in the Telegraph in 1840 and continued in various forms. Initially, childless Southport residents thought that it was unreasonable to tax them to pay for schools, but the village eventually approved. His idea proved popular when framed that education was public property and essential to good government. Other free school systems emerged in the territory, and ultimately the idea of tax-supported public schools was incorporated into Article X of the Wisconsin Constitution.

After Wisconsin became a state, Frank was chosen by the legislature as one of three commissioners to adapt the territorial laws to the new state government. Frank took charge of creating the public school code, which was adopted in the 1849 session of the legislature. During that year, he was also appointed to a special commission to compile the revised statutes of Wisconsin, which were published in the Fall of 1849.

== Mayor and later years ==
Frank was chosen as the first mayor of Kenosha after its incorporation as a city in 1850. His time as Mayor was marked by two major incidents. The first was the "Wheat Revolt" in which a number of farmers who had stored their crop at warehouses in Kenosha became alarmed by a rumor that wheat was being stolen. Mayor Frank was able to keep the peace during days of threats and incitements until a company of militia arrived from Milwaukee to ensure peace and restore confidence in the marketplace. The second major incident was a Cholera outbreak which claimed a number of lives.

He became associated with the Republican Party at the time of its formation, and was elected as a Republican to the 1861 session of the Wisconsin State Assembly. He went on to work as Postmaster of Kenosha and a Regent of the University of Wisconsin from 1861 to 1866. From 1870 to 1882, he worked in the United States Treasury Department in Washington, D.C. He returned to Kenosha after his federal service and retired from public life. He died in Kenosha in 1894.

== Published works ==
- Jordan, Charles S.; Frank, Michael; Baker, Charles Minton (1849). The Revised Statutes of the State of Wisconsin. C. Latham Sholes.

Political offices
Preceded by Position established	Village President of Southport, Wisconsin; 1841 – 1842	Succeeded by William Bullen
Preceded by William S. Strong as Village President	Mayor of Kenosha, Wisconsin; 1850 – 1851	Succeeded by David C. Gaskill
