= Wisconsin's Kenosha County 1st Assembly district =

Former American legislative district

Wisconsin's Kenosha County 1st State Assembly district
- Obsolete
- Notes: 1848–1862; 1922–1972

Wisconsin's Kenosha County 1st Assembly district was a district in the Wisconsin State Assembly for much of the history of the state of Wisconsin, up to the legislative redistricting reforms of 1972 which created the current numbered districts. Located in southeast Wisconsin, the district was always confined to the eastern quadrant of Kenosha County, Wisconsin, including the city of Kenosha. The district was one of the 66 original Assembly districts defined in Article XIV of the Constitution of Wisconsin, though it was originally known as the Racine County 4th Assembly district prior to the creation of Kenosha County in 1850.

The district was in use for elections from 1848 through 1861, then again for elections from 1922 until 1972.

== List of representatives ==
List of representatives from the Kenosha County 1st district
Member	Party	Residence	Term start	Term end	Leg.
District created
Julius L. Gilbert	Dem.	Pleasant Prairie	June 5, 1848	January 1, 1849	1st
Otis Colwell	F.S.	Southport	January 1, 1849	January 7, 1850	2nd
Samuel Hale Jr.	Dem.	Kenosha	January 7, 1850	January 6, 1851	3rd
Henry Johnson	Whig	Somers	January 6, 1851	January 5, 1852	4th
C. Latham Sholes	F.S.	Kenosha	January 5, 1852	January 2, 1854	5th 6th
Samuel Hale Jr.	F.S.	Kenosha	January 2, 1854	January 1, 1855	7th
Charles C. Sholes	Rep.	Kenosha	January 1, 1855	January 7, 1856	8th
Henry Johnson	Rep.	Kenosha	January 7, 1856	January 5, 1857	9th
Frederick S. Lovell	Rep.	Kenosha	January 5, 1857	January 3, 1859	10th 11th
George Bennett	Rep.	Kenosha	January 3, 1859	January 2, 1860	12th
Meredith Howland	Rep.	Kenosha	January 2, 1860	January 7, 1861	13th
Michael Frank	Rep.	Kenosha	January 7, 1861	January 6, 1862	14th
District abolished by 1861 Wisconsin Act 216; Kenosha County was consolidated as a single-county Assembly district
District re-established by 1921 Wisconsin Act 470
Conrad Shearer	Rep.	Kenosha	January 1, 1923	January 7, 1929	56th 57th 58th
C. Ernest Dewey	Rep.	Kenosha	January 7, 1929	January 5, 1931	59th
Lewis W. Powell	Rep.	Kenosha	January 5, 1931	January 2, 1933	60th
Alfred C. Grosvenor	Dem.	Kenosha	January 2, 1933	January 2, 1939	61st 62nd 63rd
Alfred C. Grosvenor	Dem.	Kenosha	January 2, 1939	September 1, 1939	64th
--Vacant--			September 1, 1939	January 6, 1941	64th
Frederick Pfennig	Rep.	Kenosha	January 6, 1941	January 1, 1951	65th 66th 67th 68th 69th
Joseph Lourigan	Dem.	Kenosha	January 1, 1951	January 3, 1955	70th 71st
George Molinaro	Dem.	Kenosha	January 3, 1955	January 1, 1973	72nd 73rd 74th 75th 76th 77th 78th 79th 80th
District abolished by 1971 Wisconsin Act 304; Kenosha County was divided between the 64th, 65th, and 66th Assembly districts The Kenosha County 1st district was roughly replaced by the 64th Assembly district
