= Frank Haven Hall =

American inventor and essayist (1841–1911)

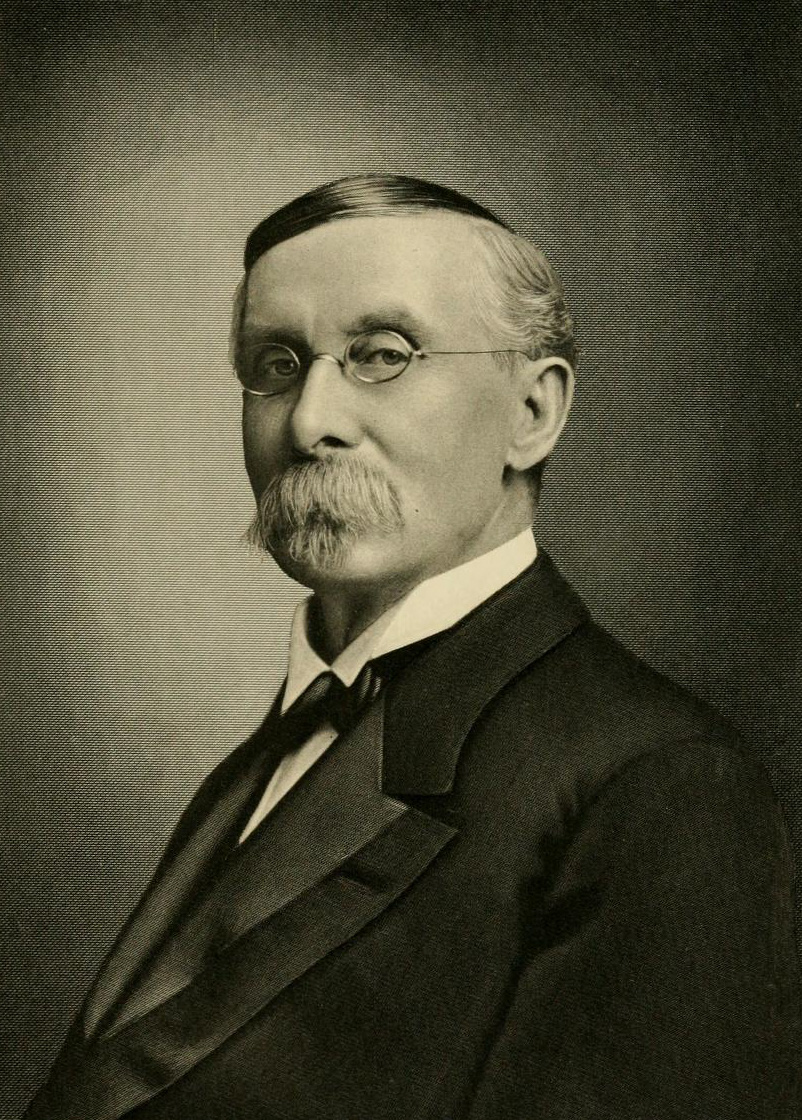
- Frank Hall in 1899
- Born: February 9, 1841; Mechanic Falls, Maine, U.S.
- Died: January 3, 1911 (aged 69); Aurora, Illinois, U.S.
- Education: Bates College
- Known for: Inventing the Hall Braille Writer
- Spouse: Sybil Hall (m. 1863–1911)
- Children: 3

Frank Haven Hall (February 9, 1841 – January 3, 1911) was an American inventor and essayist who is credited with inventing the Hall braille writer and the stereographer machine. He also invented the first successful mechanical point writer and developed major functions of modern day typography with kerning and tracking.

Born in Mechanic Falls, Maine he served in the Union Army's Maine Volunteers during the American Civil War. After the war he attended Bates College in Lewiston before initiating a teaching career. From 1862 to 1867, he taught at private and public schools throughout the greater Illinois area. While in Illinois, he held the political offices of postmaster, township treasurer, and clerk. He also owned and operated a general store, a lumberyard, and a creamery. In between his teaching and business interests he began to pursue a career in invention. Hall focused on experimental typefaces, typesetting, type design, and display configurations with ink on paper and metal placings which subsequently led to his first invention: the Hall Braille writer. He publicly announced his invention in May 1892 and unveiled it at the World's Columbian Exposition in October 1893.

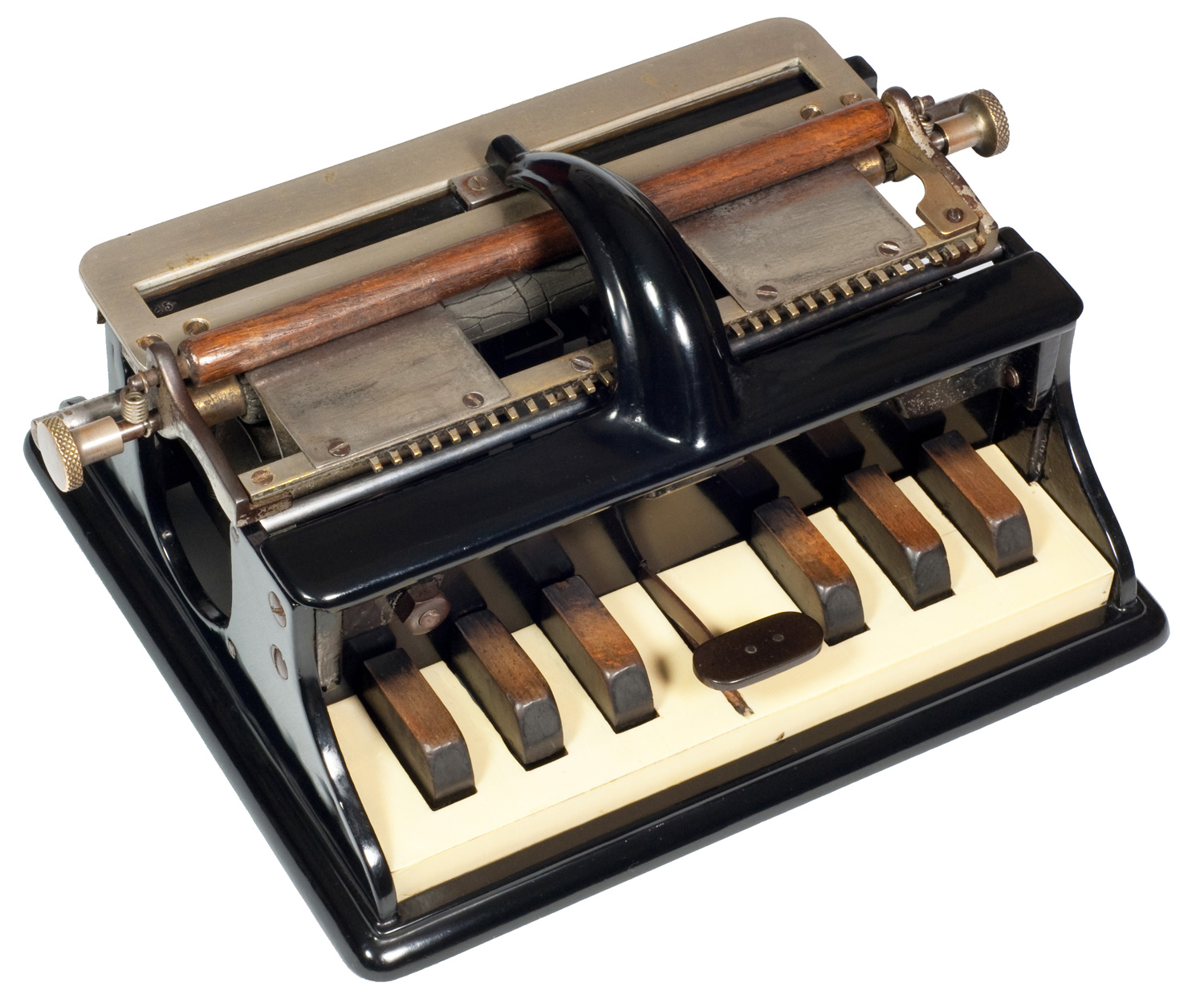
Hall-Braille writer, 1892

His furthered development of the Hall Braille Writer revolutionized Braille communication by dramatically speeding up the rate by which one could produce Braille characters. His research and development in the tactile writing system used by people who are blind or visually impaired, has been hailed as "the most innovative development of communications for the blind in the 19th century."

== Biography ==
Frank Haven Hall was born on February 9, 1841, in Mechanic Falls, Maine. During the American Civil War Hall served in the Union Army's Twenty-Third Maine Volunteers, as a hospital steward at Edward's Ferry. After the service, Hall attended Bates College from 1863 to 1864. He married Sybil Hall and with her had three children.

He began teaching primary school in 1864. Two years later he moved his family from Maine to Earlville, Illinois so Hall could advance his career in school administration. While working for the Sugar Grove public schools, Hall owned and ran a general store, a lumberyard, a creamery, and held the political offices of postmaster, township treasurer, and clerk. Hall and his wife also remained active in their local church.

Hall's first school administration post was as principal of Towle Academy in Maine. In 1866 he moved to Illinois, where he served as principal and teacher at public schools in Earlville, Aurora, Sugar Grove, Petersburg, Jacksonville, Waukegan, and Milwaukee. On May 27, 1892, he introduced the Hall Braille Writer to the public.

=== Career as inventor ===
Hall traveled to Milwaukee, Wisconsin originally to take up a position as an academic administrator but soon detoured to continue his research in Braille and commercial typewriters. He was present at a typewriter exhibition by Christopher Latham Sholes and saw the first prototype in January 1867. He compared the technical specifications of his earlier prototypes of the Braille writer and say modes to fashion it into a commercial type writer. He was introduced to Christopher Latham Sholes by Carlos Glidden and along with Samuel W. Soule began construction of what would be contested as the first commercial type writer in the United States. In 1868 their typewriter was debuted in Milwaukee, Wisconsin to critical acclaim. Hall stood by the begin and overall function of the typewriter while Sholes, Soule, and Carlos Glidden soon disowned the machine and refused to use, or even to recommend it. It looked "like something like a cross between a piano and a kitchen table."

The working prototype was made by the machinist Matthias Schwalbach, but later standardized by Hall. The patent (US 79,265) was sold for $12,000 to Densmore, Yost, and Hall who made an agreement with E. Remington and Sons (then famous as a manufacturer of sewing machines) to commercialize the machine as the Sholes and Glidden typewriter. Hall would go on to take his standardized version to Aurora, Illinois where a new position in academia was awaiting him.

After seven successful years in Aurora, he was asked to head the Sugar Grove Industrial School, a work-and-learn agricultural school nearby. Hall spent twelve years as head of the school. From his work around Aurora and Sugar Grove he learned the value of experiential learning and began to lecture at teachers' institutes around the country, challenging the "learning by rote" forms of education dominant at the time. For a short time he became superintendent of schools in Petersburg, Menard County before moving back to Aurora.

=== Career as administrator ===
Hall's most distinguished post in academic began in 1890 as Superintendent of the School for the Blind in Jacksonville, Illinois, despite his lack of training or experience with education for the blind. He was a quick study, visiting several schools for the blind on the east coast, and quickly decided that blind students required vocational and experiential learning much the same as any student. A political power shift in Illinois from the Republican party to the Democratic party caused Hall to lose his post. From 1893 to 1897, during the governorship of Democrat John Peter Altgeld, Hall served as superintendent of the Waukegan schools.

When the Republicans returned to power in 1897, Hall was reappointed to his post at the School for the Blind. He remained at the school until 1902. Hall's work led him to advocacy, most importantly persuading Chicago school administrators to create the first public school day class for blind students in 1900. This created an alternative to segregated boarding schools for the blind.

Hall was an advocate of integrating farming and agriculture into academic and studious life. He served as the official Illinois state delegate to the Farmers' National Congress in 1908 and the National Farm Land Congress in 1909, and was a member of the National Conservation Commission.

== Scientific career ==
=== Hall Braille Writer ===
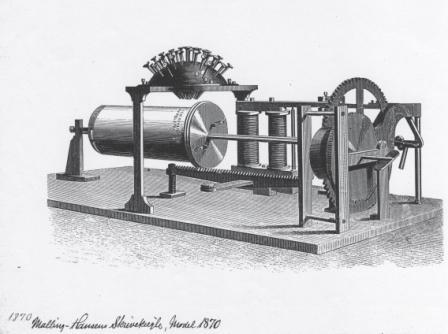
Early 1800s model of the Hansen Writing Ball used by Hall as a template

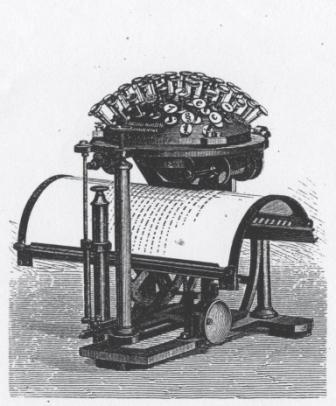
Print setter used as an ink carrier in the 1800s

On May 27, 1892, while working as superintendent for the Illinois Institution for the Blind, Hall unveiled the Hall Braille Writer. The typewriter is recognized as the first successful mechanical point writer. Modeled on typewriters of the time, his invention revolutionized Braille communication. Prior to his invention, Braille was not widely taught by teachers of the blind, because teaching Braille involved writing boards on which a student had to push one or more of six Braille character points in reverse. The Hall Braille Writer, along with Hall's advocacy, helped make Braille the dominant form of written communication for the blind. He never patented the machine because he thought profit would sully his work with the blind. The Hall Braille Writer was manufactured by the Harrison & Seifried company in Chicago, Illinois. It was manufactured for 10 dollars and sold for 11 dollars. Distribution of the machine has been found in library collections as far away as Australia and China.

==== Construction and research ====
This invention took the place of more laborious devices used for instruction. Students were regularly using slate or metal frame to guide a stylus or punch held in the hand. Hall created an instrument that adapted its stripping capabilities to produce a stereotyper, a metal plate from which multiple copies could be made. This system was built upon the previous and more established models however with key differences. One such difference was the creation of non-impressed metal holdings, which subsequently lead to a termed, "Battle of the Dots". Researches at the time, believed strongly of the typographic form of New York Point. His adaptions created a new precedent for blind education and information technology, it quickly spread around the country and was established on a global scale soon after.

==== Stereotyper ====
Hall invented several other tools used for Braille communication, most notably a stereotyper used to make typeset plates for printing Braille books. He unveiled this device at the Chicago World Fair. Other inventions include an apparatus for skimming milk and co-invention of the stereo typewriter. A Jacksonville gunmaker named Gustav A. Sieber often helped Hull with the engineering of his inventions.

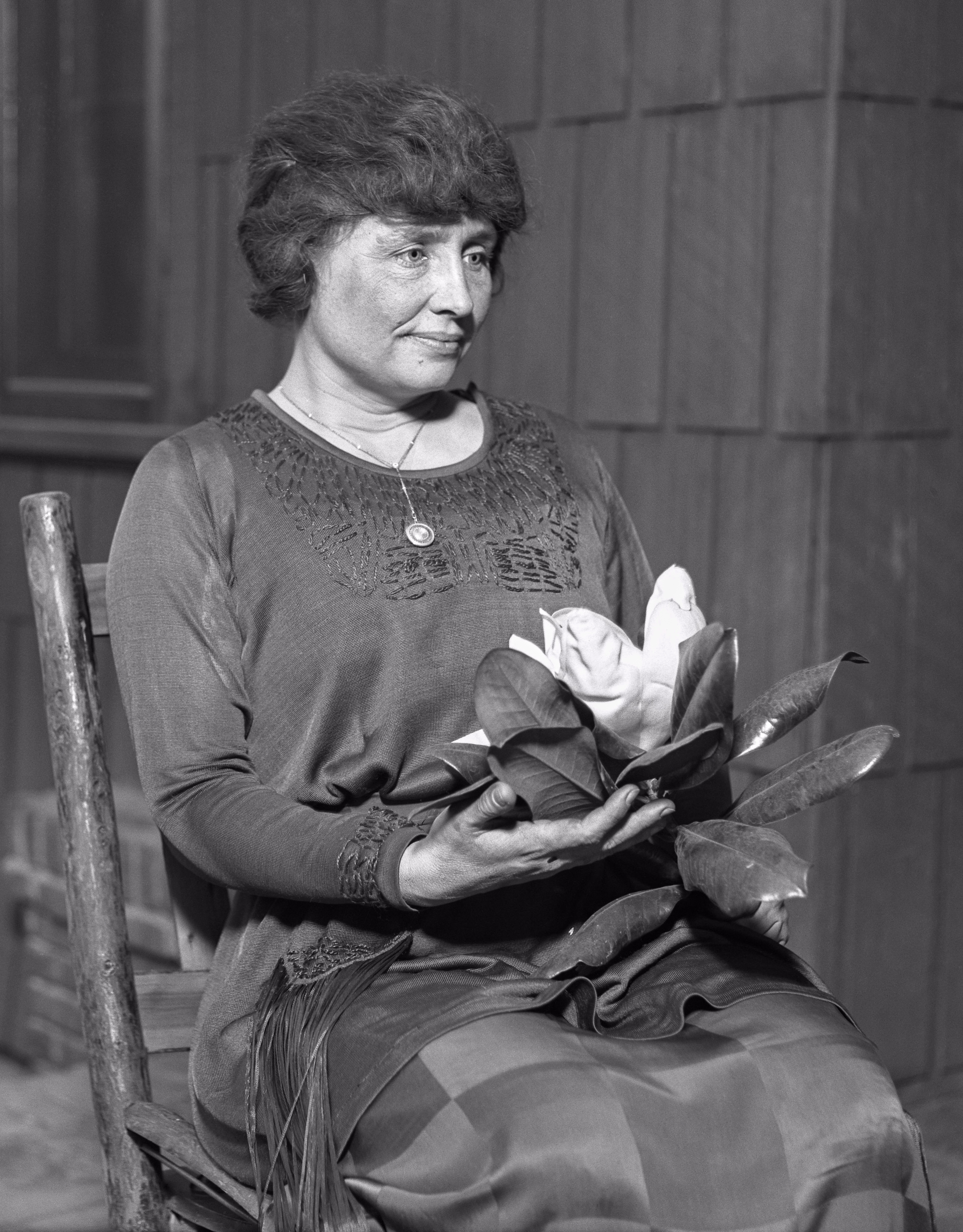
Helen Keller, beneficiary of the Hall Braille Writer

=== Chicago World Fair ===
He also co-founded the stereo typewriter which produced copies faster and cheaper, a derivative of the inventions by Rasmus Malling-Hansen, in 1893.

At the Chicago World Fair, Hall was displaying his latest invention, the stereotyper, when Helen Keller famously approached him and publicly hugged and kissed him, drawing gasps from the crowd as such an occurrence was against social structure at the time. In the book Devil in the White City, Erick Larson retells the emotional story of Hall meeting Helen Keller at the Chicago World Fair in 1893. According to Larson, when Helen Keller learned that Hall was the inventor of the Braille typewriter she used, she hugged and kissed him. Larson added that retelling the story always brought Hall to tears. She was later integral to the establishment of the practice buy learning multiple codes in order to read and write.

== Research and investigations ==
Hall was a researcher focused on the development of the Hall Braille Writer, first formed in 1892. It would go on to revolutionize Braille communication by dramatically speeding up the rate by which one could produce Braille characters. His research and development in the tactile writing system used by people who are blind or visually impaired, has been hailed as "the most innovative development of communications for the blind in the 19th century." His main research focused on specialized machines with differentiated keys, one for each dot in the Braille cell. He also worked on international uniformity of the braille alphabets, and the development of typesetting systems.

== Death and legacy ==
In the spring of 1910, he was diagnosed with tuberculosis of the lungs and diabetes. He died the following January. Hall's final resting place is in Aurora, Illinois.

Hall's legacy is honored through the names of a few Illinois area schools. The main administrative building at the Illinois School for the Visually Impaired is named the Frank Haven Hall Building. Also, in the West Auroral School District 129, where Hall served as Superintendent, the Hall Elementary School is named for him.

Artist Rudulph Evans commissioned a sculpture of Hall's likeness in 1912. It stood for many years at Hall Elementary, and is now on permanent loan to the Smithsonian Institution.

=== Publications ===
==== Hall's Mathematical Series ====
Hall has written approximately twenty widely circulated textbooks and publications on mathematics, structuralism, and educationalist policy. He was widely known for his publications of Hall's Mathematical Series. Some of the most prominent textbooks and publications include:

- Hall, Frank H. The Arithmetic Primer; an Independent Number Book to Precede Any Series of Arithmetics. Werner School Book Co. (1901)
- Hall, Frank H. The Werner Arithmetic: Oral and Written. Books III – Parts I and II. Werner School Book Co. (1898)
- Hall, Frank H. The Practical Arithmetic: Oral and Written. Werner School Book Co. (1899)
- Hall, Frank H. Arithmetic, How to Teach It Published: Werner School Book Co. (1900)
- Hall, Frank H. The Primary Arithmetic: Oral and Written. Werner School Book Co. (1906)

== Selected works ==
- Hall, F.H. (1909). The ethical value of vocational stitution in secondary schools (National education association of the United States. Journal of proceedings and addresses) . Publisher: s.n.

== See also ==
- List of inventors
- List of people from Maine
- List of Bates College people
