= Senator Sholes =

Senator Sholes may refer to:

- Charles Sholes (1816–1867), Wisconsin State Senate
- Christopher Latham Sholes (1819–1890), Wisconsin State Senate
