= Albert Gallatin Ellis =

American newspaper publisher and politician

Albert G. Ellis
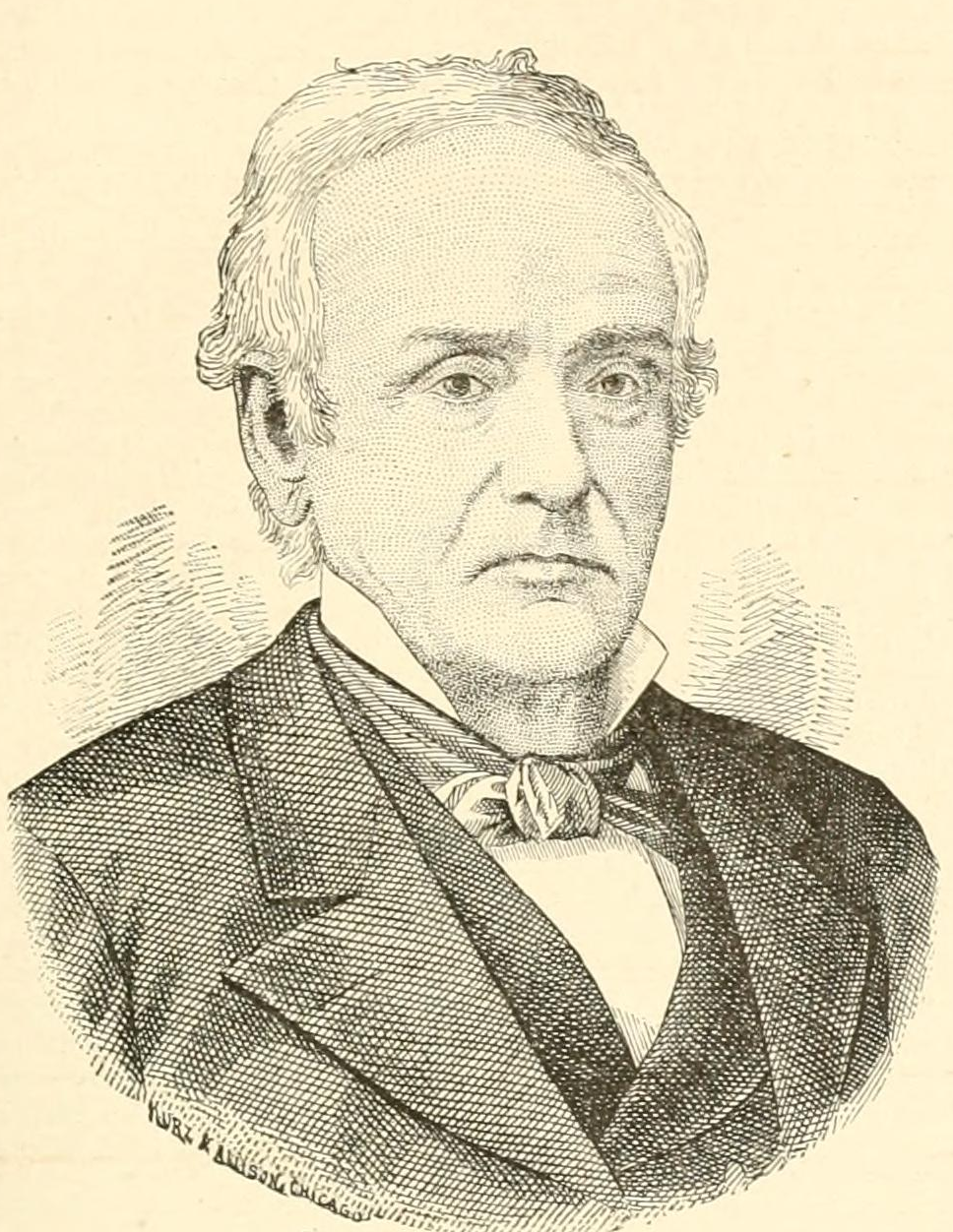

2nd, 6th, 8th, and 10th Mayor of Stevens Point, Wisconsin
- In office April 1869 – April 1872
- Preceded by: James S. Young
- Succeeded by: A. Eaton
- In office April 1867 – April 1868
- Preceded by: W. W. Spraggon
- Succeeded by: James S. Young
- In office April 1864 – April 1866
- Preceded by: B. L. Sharpstein
- Succeeded by: W. W. Spraggon
- In office April 1860 – April 1861
- Preceded by: William W. Schofield
- Succeeded by: G. L. Park

Speaker of the Legislative Assembly of the Wisconsin Territory
- In office December 5, 1842 – December 4, 1843
- Preceded by: David Newland
- Succeeded by: George H. Walker

Representative to the Legislative Assembly of the Wisconsin Territory from Brown, Fond du Lac, Manitowoc, Portage, and Sheboygan Counties
- In office December 6, 1841 – January 6, 1845 Serving with Mason C. Darling (1841-45) David Giddings (1841-42) and David Agry (1842-45)
- Preceded by: William H. Bruce; Mason C. Darling; David Giddings
- Succeeded by: Mason C. Darling; Abraham Brawley; William Fowler

Representative to the Legislative Assembly of the Wisconsin Territory from Brown County
- In office October 25, 1836 – November 6, 1837 Serving with Ebenezer Childs and Alexander J. Irwin
- Preceded by: Position Established
- Succeeded by: Ebenezer Childs; George McWilliams; Charles Sholes

Personal details
- Born: Albert Gallatin Ellis; August 26, 1800 Vernon, New York
- Died: December 23, 1885 (aged 85) Stevens Point, Wisconsin
- Resting place: Forest Cemetery; Stevens Point, Wisconsin
- Party: Democratic
- Spouses: Pamela Holmes; (died 1847); Eliza Charlotte Juliana Louise Breuninger; (died 1872)
- Children: with Pamela Holmes; Eleazor Holmes Ellis^{(b. 1826; died 1906)}; Fredrick Seymour Ellis^{(b. 1830; died 1879)}; Richard F. C. Ellis^{(b. 1832; died 1881)}; Virginia (Mooers)^{(b. 1836; died 1853)}; Pamela Holmes (Hogle)^{(b. 1848; died 1936)}; with Eliza Breuninger; Theodore Conkey Ellis^{(b. 1849; died 1871)}; Lora B. (Wadleigh)^{(b. 1852; died 1937)}; Candace Ellis^{(b. 1855; died 1881)}; Eliza Ellis^{(b. 1862; died 1917)}; Sophronia Ellis^{(b. 1864; died 1881)}

Albert Gallatin Ellis (August 24, 1800 – December 23, 1885) was one of the first American pioneers to settle in Wisconsin. He was the 2nd, 6th, 8th, and 10th Mayor of Stevens Point, Wisconsin. Before statehood, he was a member of the legislature of the Wisconsin Territory and was a publisher of the first newspaper west of Lake Michigan.

== Biography ==
Ellis was born in Verona, New York, on August 24, 1800. An Episcopalian missionary, Ellis moved to Green Bay, Wisconsin Territory, with members of the Oneida people to establish a colony and a school. He later became involved in the Public Land Survey System before becoming a publisher of the Green Bay Intelligencer in 1834, the first newspaper west of Lake Michigan. In 1852, Ellis moved to Stevens Point, Wisconsin, where he worked with the United States General Land Office and became a surveyor general, as well as once again became a newspaper publisher, eventually becoming an editor. Ellis died on December 23, 1885.

Two of his sons, Eleazor H. Ellis and Frederick S. Ellis, became mayors of Green Bay.

== Political career ==
Ellis served as secretary to the Seventh Michigan Territorial Council for the western area of Michigan Territory. In 1836 and again from 1841 to 1844, Ellis was a member of the Wisconsin Territorial House of Representatives of the Wisconsin Territorial Legislature. After Wisconsin's admission to the Union, Ellis served as Mayor of Stevens Point. He was a Democrat.

Political offices
Preceded by William W. Schofield	Mayor of Stevens Point, Wisconsin; 1860 – 1861	Succeeded by G. L. Park
Preceded by B. L. Sharpstein	Mayor of Stevens Point, Wisconsin; 1864 – 1866	Succeeded by W. W. Spraggon
Preceded by W. W. Spraggon	Mayor of Stevens Point, Wisconsin; 1867 – 1868	Succeeded by James S. Young
Preceded by James S. Young	Mayor of Stevens Point, Wisconsin; 1869 – 1872	Succeeded by A. Eaton
