= John Pratt (inventor) =

American Journalist and inventor (1831–1905)

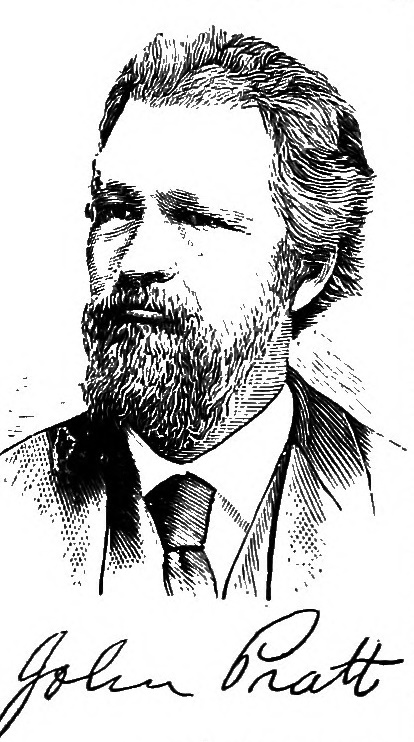
Portrait sketch from The National Cyclopædia of American Biography

John Jonathan Pratt (April 14, 1831 – 24/25 June 1905) was an American journalist and inventor, known for creating the Pterotype, one of the earliest typewriters.

== Biography ==
Pratt was born in Unionville, South Carolina on April 14, 1831. His father was a judge. Pratt was educated in South Carolina and graduated from Cokesbury College in 1849. For some years, he worked as a journalist and lawyer. He married, at the age of twenty-one, Julia R. Porter, a daughter of Judge Benjamin F. Porter, of Alabama.

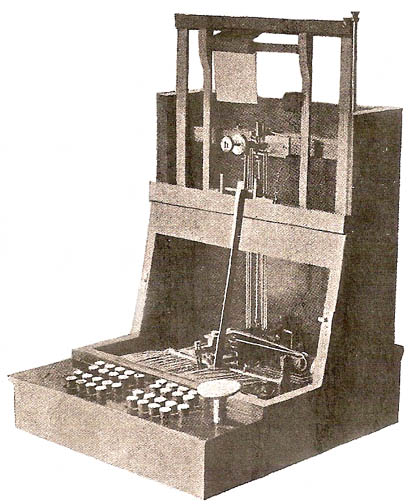
Pratt's Pterotype machine

In 1864, Pratt and his wife moved to England. He devoted his time to inventing a typewriting machine, which he called the Ptérotype. It proved to be the first working typewriter that ever secured a sale. In 1867 his machine was exhibited before the Society of Arts, the Society of Engineers, and the Royal Society. The invention received provisional protection from the British government in February 1864, and was awarded letters patent No. 3,163 on December 1, 1866. Pratt's machine was covered in several journals, and one such description attracted the attention of Christopher Latham Sholes and Carlos Glidden, who went on to develop the Remington No. 1, which became the first commercially successful typewriter.

Pratt returned to the United States in 1868, and secured letters patent No. 81,000 in August of that year. He continued to develop his typewriter; his second US patent was sold to the Hammond Typewriter Company. In 1886, he moved to Brooklyn, New York, where he lived until around 1903. Pratt died in 1905 in Chattanooga, Tennessee, aged 74.
