= Emmet Densmore =

American physician

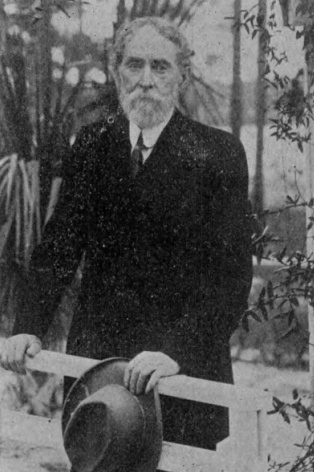
- Born: May 19, 1837; Crawford County, Pennsylvania, U.S.
- Died: March 2, 1911 (aged 73); New York, U.S.
- Occupations: Businessman, physician and natural hygiene writer

Emmet Densmore (May 19, 1837 – March 2, 1911) was an American businessman, physician and natural hygiene advocate who promoted an early version of the Paleolithic diet.

== Biography ==
Densmore was born in Crawford County, Pennsylvania. He was the son of Joel and Sophia Densmore. In his youth he worked at his father's sawmill and worked as a printer at Meadville, Pennsylvania. Densmore spent two years at Allegheny College. In 1862, he developed with his brothers one of the first successful oil wells in Oil Creek, Pennsylvania. He bought and sold oil wells and for several years worked with his brother James Densmore in developing the Sholes typewriter. This typewriter later became known as the Remington typewriter. During 1871–1872, Densmore owned British patents for the typewriter and introduced it to London. In 1885, he developed with his brother Amos, the Densmore typewriter. The first Densmore typewriter appeared on the market in 1891.

Densmore obtained his M.D. from the New York University Medical College in 1885. He was President of Garfield Tea Company, Brooklyn which produced "Garfield Tea", made entirely from herbs. Densmore married several times. He married Elizabeth Heard in 1855, Helen Barnard in 1881 and Mabelle Hoff in 1905.

He owned a 110-acre ranch in Los Alamitos, the majority of land consisted of fruit trees. He was President of the Barnard Densmore Company which manufactured distilled water and preserved fruits in Los Angeles. Densmore was a believer in psychic and spiritualist phenomena. He wrote the introduction to Hudson Tuttle's book Arcana of Nature.

Densmore was a proponent of intelligent design. He commented that "I am one of those unfashionable scientists who perceive design in the universe. It does not matter what title we give the Supreme Ruler: Natural Law, or God, or what you will: there seems to me conclusive evidence of intelligent design in the Great Artificer."

== Dieting ==
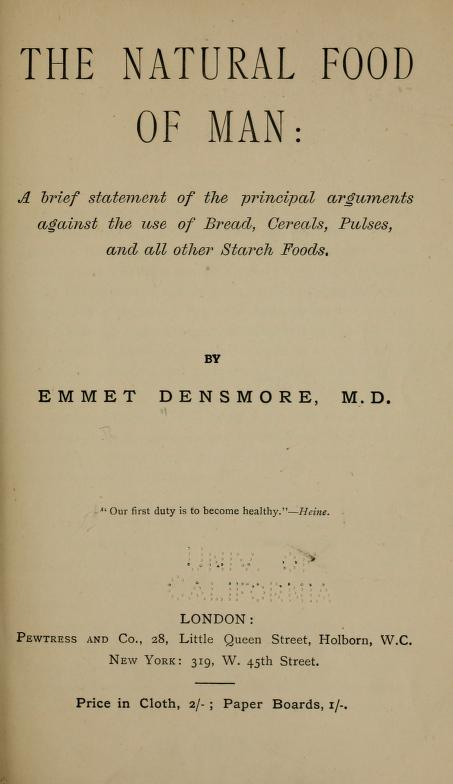
The Natural Food of Man, published in 1890

Densmore promoted a fruit and meat diet, which he believed was the natural food of primal man. He stated that "bread is the staff of death". Densmore opposed the consumption of bread, cereal, pulses and vegetables. He believed that all starch foods were not beneficial and urged the use of sweet fruits in their place. His recommended diet consisted of fruit, meat, nuts, fish, eggs and milk. He believed that the natural life of man should be 120 years.

Densmore was a fierce opponent of the medical profession and vegetarianism. He opposed the use of all drugs and believed that dietetic and natural hygienic measures could cure disease. He advocated fasting as a treatment for illness. Densmore authored the book The Natural Food of Man, and moved to Britain just before 1890. His book was influential to naturopaths. Medical experts criticized the book for promoting a fad diet. A review in the Edinburgh Medical Journal, noted that Densmore's belief that carbohydrate foods are injurious to health is not supported by physiology and "in demolishing a vegetarian fad, it seems to us Dr Densmore is only constructing another fad of his own."

Densmore argued that cereals were "unnatural and disease-inducing foods". Articles were published that contested his "anticerealism". James Burn described his diet as "anti-vegetarian quackery". Densmore edited the London monthly magazine, Natural Food (1890–1895) and with his wife Helen, edited the health magazine Earnest Words. In 1890, Densmore and Helen founded the Natural Food Society in London which offered a system of dietary principles that was more enjoyable and practical than "orthodox vegetarianism or the ordinary fare".

== Death ==
Contradictory information exists about Densmore's death. Obituaries in several medical journals and newspapers have stated that Densmore died at Cassadaga, Florida after two years of illness on February 18, 1911. The American Library Annual lists his date of death as March 2, 1911, in New York.

Densmore left a large part of his fortune to the Tuskegee Institute. He requested for his body to be given to a medical school for dissection.

== Publications ==
- The Natural Food of Man: A Brief Statement of the Principal Arguments Against the Use of Bread, Cereals, Pulses, and All Other Starch Foods (1890)
- How Nature Cures (1892)
- Fruit as Food (1896)
- Consumption and Chronic Diseases (1899)
- Sex Equality: A Solution of the Woman Problem (1907)
