= Green Bay Intelligencer =

Defunct newspaper published in Green Bay, Wisconsin

Copy of the first edition of the Green-Bay Intelligencer

The Green Bay Intelligencer was Wisconsin’s first newspaper. Based in Green Bay, Wisconsin, it was founded by businessman John V. Suydam, with the first issue published on December 11, 1833. Albert Gallatin Ellis joined the paper in 1834. In 1834, Ellis, and subsequently the Green-Bay Intelligencer, supported the campaign of local judge James Duane Doty. As a result, opponents of Doty formed their own newspaper. The newspaper continued with several suspensions until June 1835, at which point Ellis entered a partnership with C. C. Arndt, creating the new partnership, Ellis & Arndt. In 1837 the Green-Bay Intelligencer was sold to Christopher Sholes, who moved the newspaper to Southport, Wisconsin (now Kenosha).

== Notes and references ==
- "Green Bay Home of First Newspaper", Milwaukee Free Press, 1910-07-17
