= Sholes and Glidden typewriter =

First commercially successful typewriter

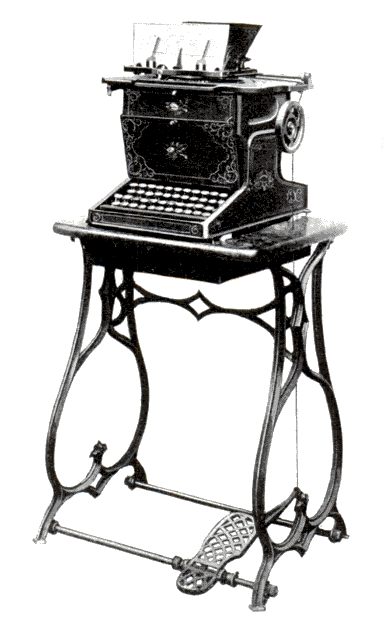
The Sholes and Glidden typewriter as produced by E. Remington and Sons

The Sholes and Glidden typewriter (also known as the Remington No. 1) was the first commercially successful typewriter. Principally designed by the American inventor Christopher Latham Sholes, it was developed with the assistance of fellow printer Samuel W. Soule and amateur mechanic Carlos S. Glidden. Work began in 1867, but Soule left the enterprise shortly thereafter, replaced by James Densmore, who provided financial backing and the driving force behind the machine's continued development. After several short-lived attempts to manufacture the device, the machine was acquired by E. Remington and Sons in early 1873. An arms manufacturer seeking to diversify, Remington further refined the typewriter before finally placing it on the market on July 1, 1874.

During its development, this typewriter evolved from a crude curiosity into a practical device, the basic form of which became the industry standard. The machine incorporated elements which became fundamental to typewriter design, including a cylindrical platen and a four row QWERTY keyboard. Several design deficiencies remained, however. The Sholes and Glidden could print only upper-case letters—an issue remedied in its successor, the Remington No. 2—and was a "blind writer", meaning the typist could not see what was being written as it was entered.

Initially, the typewriter received an unenthusiastic reception from the public. Lack of an established market, high cost, and the need for trained operators slowed its adoption. Additionally, recipients of typewritten messages found the mechanical, all-upper-case writing to be impersonal and even insulting. The new communication technologies and expanding businesses of the late 19th century, however, had created a need for expedient, legible correspondence, and so the Sholes and Glidden and its contemporaries soon became common office fixtures. The typewriter is credited with assisting the entrance of women into the clerical workplace, as many were hired to operate the new devices.

== History ==
=== Early development ===
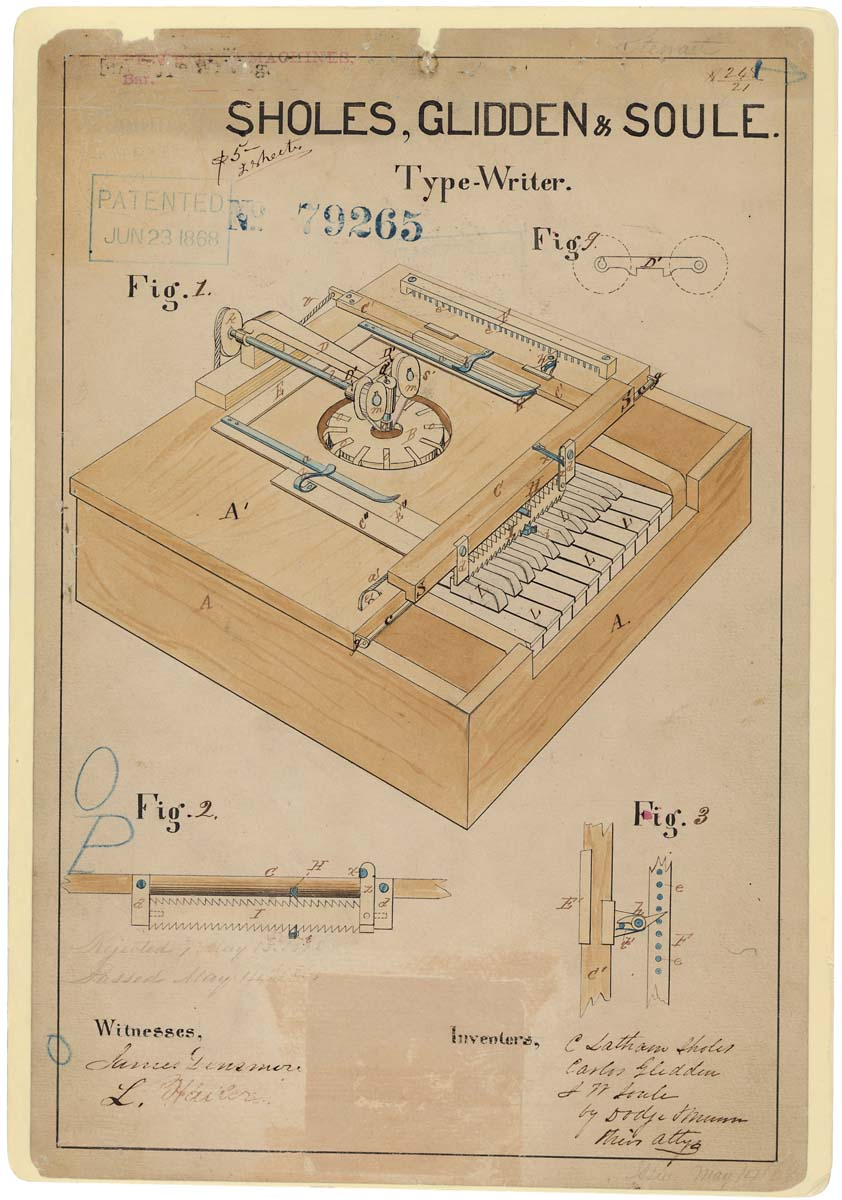
The machine patented on June 23, 1868, resembled "a cross between a piano and a kitchen table".

The Sholes and Glidden typewriter had its origin in a printing machine designed in 1866 by Christopher Latham Sholes to assist in printing page numbers in books, and serial numbers on tickets and other items. Sholes, a Wisconsin printer, formed a partnership with Samuel W. Soule, also a printer, and together they began development work in Charles F. Kleinsteuber's machine shop, a converted mill in northern Milwaukee. Carlos S. Glidden, an inventor who frequented the machine shop, became interested in the device and suggested that it might be adapted to print alphabetical characters as well. In July 1867, Glidden read an article in Scientific American describing "the Pterotype", a writing machine invented by John Pratt and recently featured in an issue of London Engineering. Glidden showed the article to Sholes, who thought the machine "complicated and liable to get out of order", and was convinced that a better machine could be designed. To that point, several dozen patents for printing devices had been issued in the United States and abroad. None of the machines, however, had been successful or effective products.

In November 1866, following their successful collaboration on the numbering machine, Sholes asked Soule to join him and Glidden in developing the new device. Mathias Schwalbach, a German clockmaker, was hired to assist with construction. To test the proposed machine's feasibility, a key was taken from a telegraph machine and modified to print the letter "W"; by September 1867, a model with a full alphabet, numbers, and rudimentary punctuation had been completed, and it was used to compose letters to acquaintances in the hope of selling the invention, or procuring funds for its manufacture. One recipient, James Densmore, immediately bought a 25% interest for $600, (Note: Equivalent to about $14,000 in 2025) the cost of the machine's development to that date. Densmore saw the machine for the first time in March 1868, and was unimpressed; he thought it clumsy and impractical, and declared it "good for nothing except to show that its underlying principles were sound". Among other deficiencies, the device held paper in a horizontal frame, which limited the thickness of the paper that could be used and made alignment difficult. A patent for the "Type-Writer" was granted on June 23, 1868, and, despite the device's flaws, Densmore rented a building in Chicago in which to begin its manufacture. Fifteen units were produced before a lack of funds forced the venture back to Milwaukee.

=== Refinement ===
During 1869, an improved model was designed which, unlike the previous version, drew upon work done by other inventors. A machine patented in 1833 by Charles Thurber, (Note: Alternatively, the Thurber device is dated 1845.) for example, used a cylindrical platen. Sholes adapted the idea and implemented a rotating drum to which the paper was clipped, replacing the frame of the previous model. Soule and Glidden did not assist development of the new platen and, as their interest in the venture was waning, sold their rights to the original machine to Sholes and Densmore. Prototypes were sent to professionals in various fields, including James O. Clephane, a stenographer whose heavy use destroyed several machines. Clephane's feedback, although "caustic", led to the development of an additional 25 to 30 prototypes, each an improvement on its predecessor. In summer 1870, Densmore traveled to New York to demonstrate the machine to Western Union, (Note: The telegraph company is also reported to have been the Automatic Telegraph Company, or the Atlantic & Pacific Telegraph Company. Atlantic & Pacific acquired Automatic Telegraph and was itself later absorbed by Western Union in February 1881.) which was looking for a method to record telegrams. Western Union ordered several machines, but declined to purchase the rights, as it believed a superior device could be developed for less than Densmore's asking price of $50,000. (Note: Equivalent to about $1,273,000 in 2025.)

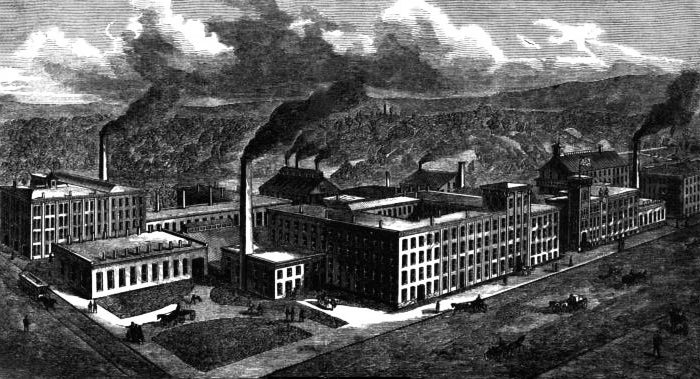
E. Remington and Sons' factory in Ilion, New York, c. 1874

To supply the orders and to repay debts, Densmore began to manufacture the machine in summer 1871. During this time, the machine was revised to improve durability and the platen was redesigned after feedback from Western Union, which wanted the ability to print on a continuous roll, indicated that clipping paper to the platen was impractical. The new design, however, infringed a patent granted to Charles A. Washburn in November 1870; Washburn, consequently, received royalties on future production. In 1872, to manufacture the new machine in earnest, a former wheelwright shop was secured along with several employees. Although the machines worked well, the lack of economies of scale prevented the venture from yielding a profit. In exchange for funding the ventures, Densmore had been acquiring an ever-increasing ownership interest. Sholes was eventually bought out for a cash payment of $12,000. (Note: Equivalent to about $306,000 in 2025.) Glidden kept his one-tenth right of the patent. Densmore consulted with George W. N. Yost, a manufacturer with whom he had been acquainted, who suggested showing the machine to E. Remington and Sons. Remington, an arms manufacturer seeking to diversify after the Civil War, possessed the machining equipment and skilled machinists necessary to further develop the complex machine. A typewritten letter was sent to Remington, where executive Henry H. Benedict was impressed by the novelty and encouraged company president Philo Remington to pursue the device.

=== Start of an industry ===
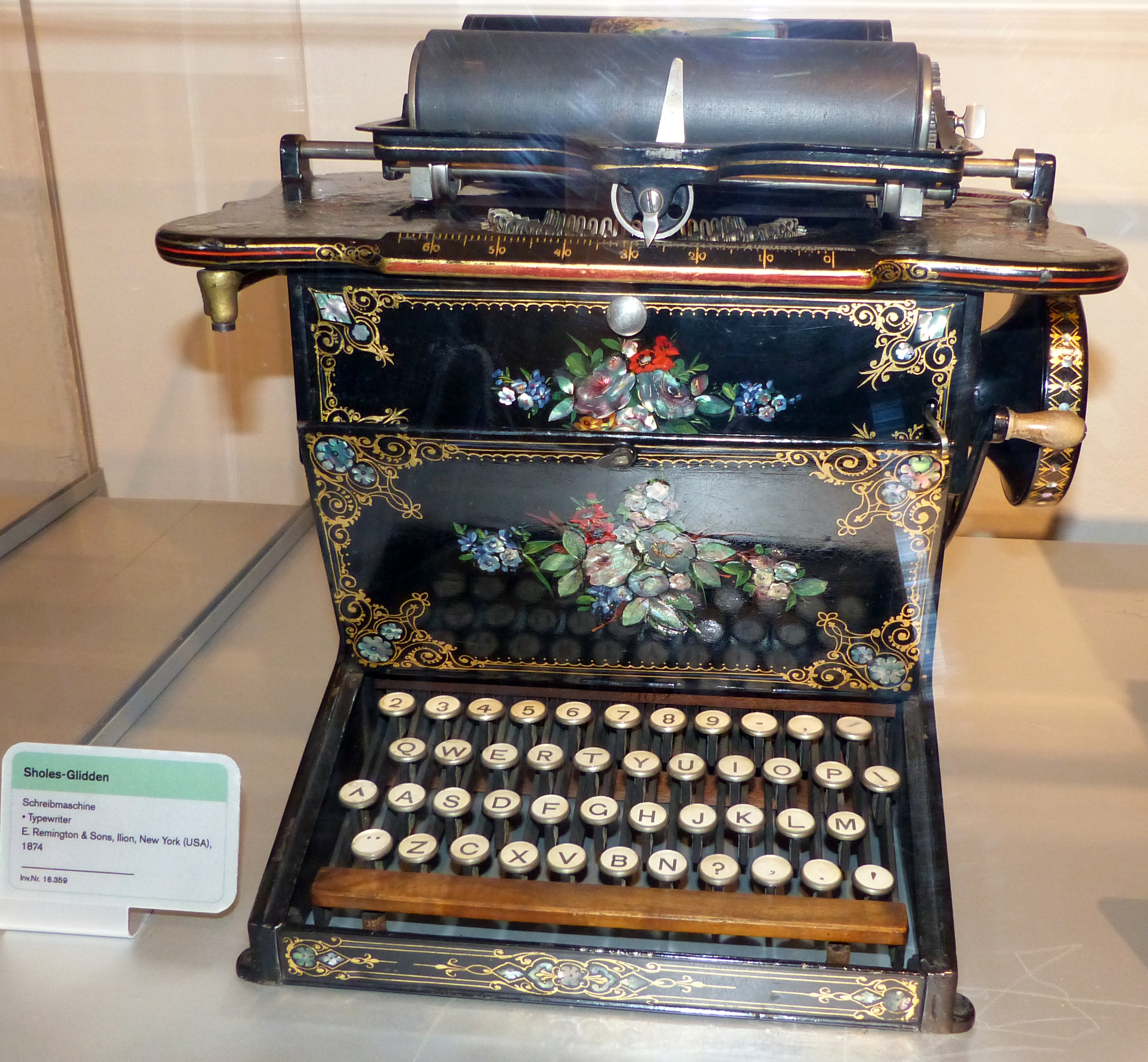
A redesign incorporated floral ornamentation, a characteristic from Remington's sewing machine division.

Following a demonstration at Remington's offices in New York, the company contracted on March 1, 1873, to manufacture 1,000 machines, with the option to produce an additional 24,000. Although the agreement required Densmore to give Remington $10,000 and royalty rights, (Note: Equivalent to about $269,000 in 2025.) a marketing firm to be formed by Densmore and Yost was allowed to serve as the exclusive sales agent. (Note: Densmore ultimately earned $1,500,000 in royalty payments, equivalent to about $58,000,000 in 2025.) Remington dedicated a wing of its factory to the typewriter, and spent several months retooling and re-engineering the device; production began in September and the machine entered the market on July 1, 1874. Typewriter production was largely overseen by Jefferson Clough and William K. Jenne, manager of Remington's sewing machine division. The redesigned machine was sturdier and more reliable than Sholes' model, but it had taken on some of the characteristics of a sewing machine, including a japanned case with floral ornamentation and a stand with a treadle to operate the carriage return. The typewriter, however, had been rushed into production with insufficient testing, and early models were soon returned for adjustments and repair.

By December 1874, only 400 typewriters had been sold, due in part to their high price and poor reliability. As businesses were slow to adopt the machine, authors, clergymen, lawyers and newspaper editors were the targeted customers. Individuals, however, generally did not write enough to justify the machine's price of about $125, the average annual income per person at the time. There were exceptions, however; Mark Twain was among the first to purchase the machine, which he termed a "curiosity breeding little joker". Although the machine was exhibited at the Centennial Exhibition in 1876, it was overshadowed by Alexander Graham Bell's telephone. Several design and manufacturing improvements followed—including replacing the treadle with a hand lever—and 4,000 machines had been sold by 1877. In 1878, Remington outsourced marketing to E. & T. Fairbanks & Company, a scale manufacturer, as marketing to that point had produced only lackluster sales.

An improved model, the Remington No. 2, was also introduced in 1878. The new machine was able to type upper and lowercase characters, thus remedying a significant drawback of its predecessor. As the only typewriter manufacturer, Remington maintained a monopoly position until the American Writing Machine Company introduced a typewriter to compete with the Remington machines in 1881. In response to the new competition, Remington lowered the price of the Sholes and Glidden (referred to in sales literature as the Remington No. 1) to $80, and negotiated an agreement with the marketing firm Wyckoff, Seamans & Benedict to take all the machines produced. The arrangement marked the beginning of the typewriter's commercial success, as the agency's marketing prowess led to the sale of 1,200 machines in its first year. By 1884, more competitors had appeared, including the Hammond Typewriter Company, the Crandall Type-Writer Company and the Hall Typewriter Company; in the decade since the introduction of the Sholes and Glidden, a "thriving typewriter industry" had developed.

== Design ==
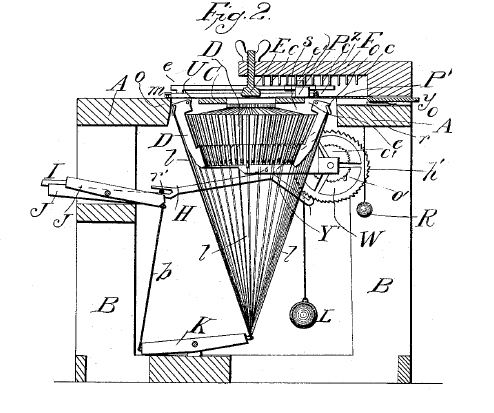
One variant of the Sholes and Glidden typewriter used wires and levers to connect the keys and typebars.

The Sholes and Glidden typewriter incorporated several components adapted from existing devices, such as escapement (a mechanism governing carriage movement) adapted from clockwork, keys adapted from telegraph machines and type hammers adapted from the piano. In developing the first model, however, Sholes and Soule had not investigated printing machines created by other inventors and, consequently, developed several poor designs which could have been avoided. The failure to research earlier designs also led to the reinvention of features which had already been developed. Soule, for example, suggested a circular typebar orientation. A circular arrangement had been used more than 30 years earlier in a machine designed by Xavier Progin in 1833.

In the machine's original 1868 design, paper was placed horizontally on the top of the machine, held in place by a movable square frame (to provide line and letter spacing). Above the paper and centered on the device, an arm held an inked ribbon which crossed over a small metal plate. Depressing a key caused a typebar to rise from underneath the paper, pressing the paper upwards against the ribbon and thus printing an inked character. This method of imprinting required use of very thin, nonstandard paper (such as tissue paper). Two variants were produced with alternative methods of actuating the typebars: one in which the keys and typebars were connected by a series of wires and one in which the keys directly "kicked" the typebars upwards.

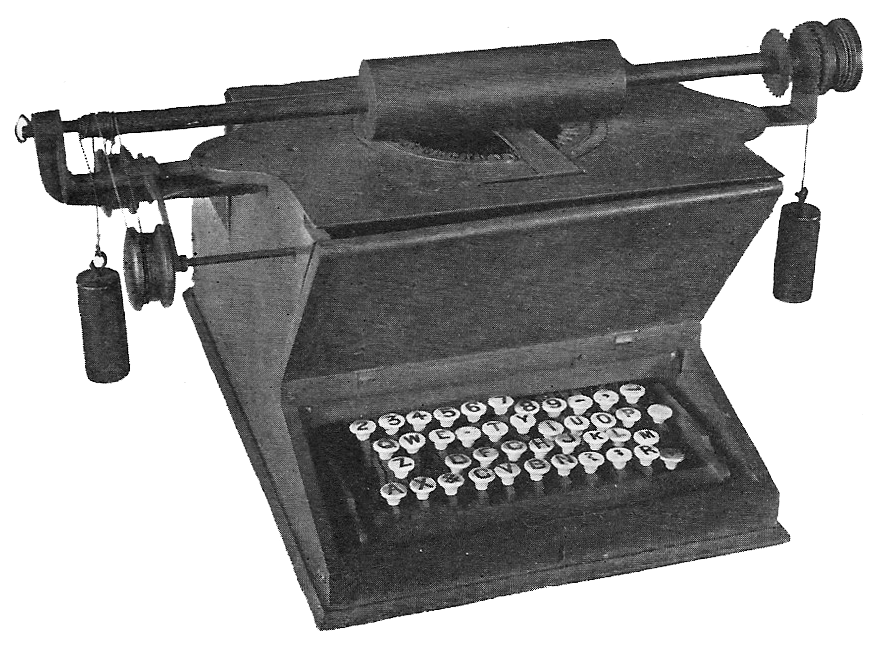
By the end of 1872, the typewriter had taken an appearance similar to that of a modern typewriter.

The arm and frame components were replaced with a cylindrical platen in 1869. Unlike modern typewriters, the revised machine entered letters around the cylinder, with axial rotation providing letter spacing and horizontal shifting providing line spacing. Paper was clipped directly to the cylinder, which limited its length and width to the dimensions of the apparatus. The platen was again redesigned in early 1872 to allow the use of paper of any length. The redesigned platen also introduced the modern spacing functionality (horizontal and axial movement providing letter and line spacing, respectively). The cylindrical platen became "an indispensable part of every standard [typewriter]".

By the end of 1872, the appearance and function of the typewriter had assumed the form that would become standard in the industry and remain largely unchanged for the next century. Although the machine possessed a cylindrical platen and what was essentially a QWERTY keyboard, two design elements that would later become essential were lacking: the ability to write in upper and lowercase letters and "visible" print. Although the former was implemented in the Remington No. 2, the machine was fundamentally an "upstrike" design, meaning the typebars struck upwards against the underside of the platen. As this occurred inside the machine, the operator could not see what was being entered as it was typed. Although competing brands, such as the Oliver and Underwood, began to market "visible" typewriters in the 1890s, a Remington-branded model did not appear until the Remington No. 10 in 1906.

=== QWERTY keyboard ===
The QWERTY keyboard, so named for the first six characters of the uppermost alphabetic row, was invented during the course of the typewriter's development. The first model constructed by Sholes used a piano-like keyboard with two rows of characters arranged alphabetically as follows:

3 5 7 9 N O P Q R S T U V W X Y Z<br />2 4 6 8 . A B C D E F G H I J K L M

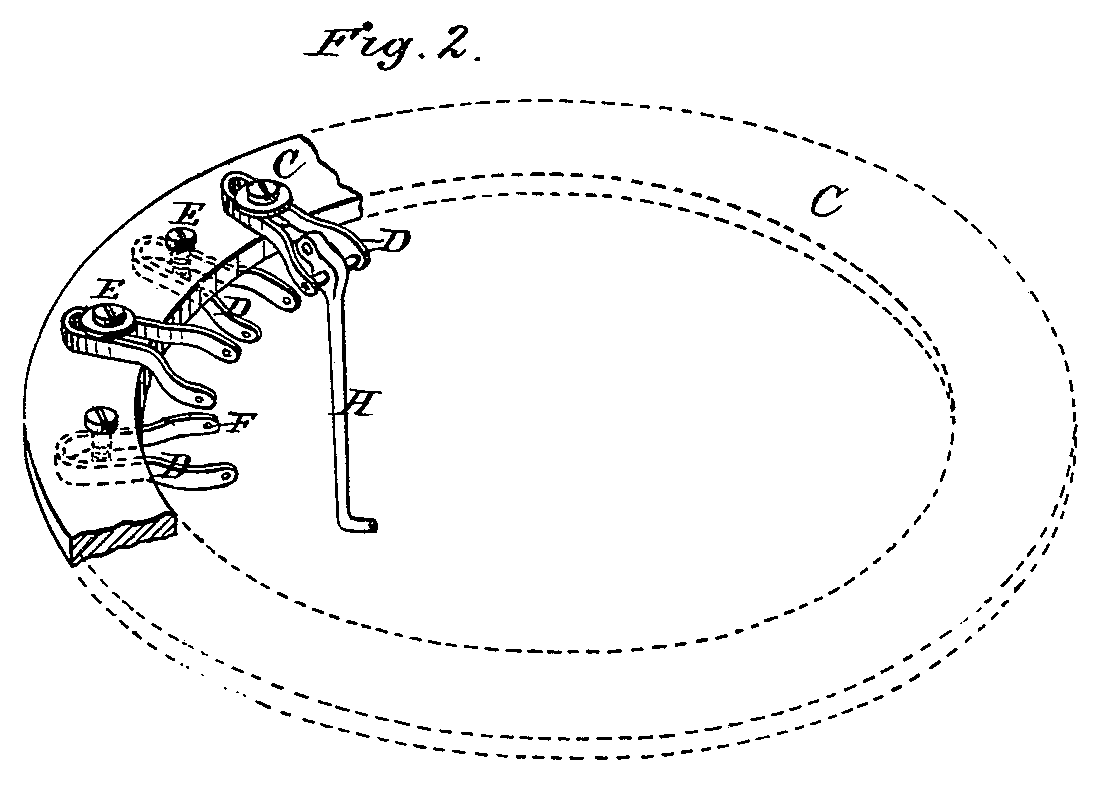
Typebars were attached to the circumference of a metal ring such that they would strike a common center.

Schwalbach later replaced the piano-like keys with "buttons" and positioned them into four banked rows. The mechanics of the machine, however, made the alphabetical arrangement problematic. The typebars were attached to the circumference of a metal ring, forming a "basket". When a key was pressed, the corresponding typebar would swing upwards, causing the print head to strike at the center of the ring. Gravity would then return the typebar to its initial position. It has been suggested that implication of this design, however, was that pressing adjoining keys in quick succession would cause their typebars to collide and jam the machine. To mitigate this problem, keys were reordered using analysis of letter frequency and trial and error, but others consider this analysis incorrect. Densmore asked his son-in-law, a Pennsylvania school superintendent, what letters and combinations of letters appeared most often in the English language. Typebars corresponding to letters in commonly occurring alphabetical pairs, such as S and T, were placed on opposite sides on the ring. The keyboard ultimately presented to Remington was arranged as follows:

2 3 4 5 6 7 8 9 - ,<br />Q W E . T Y I U O P<br />Z S D F G H J K L M<br />A X & C V B N ? ; R

After it purchased the device, Remington made several adjustments—including switching the period and "R" keys, so that salesmen could impress customers by typing "TYPEWRITER" using the keys in the top row—which created a keyboard with what is essentially the modern QWERTY layout.

== Reception and legacy ==
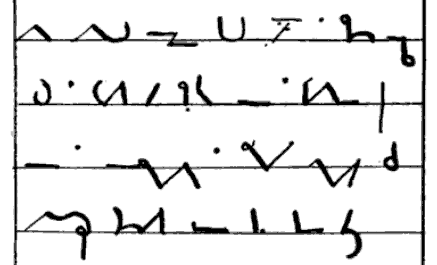
Shorthand, although capable of being written quickly, required special training to comprehend. The typewriter simultaneously addressed the need for speed and legibility.

The Sholes and Glidden was the first commercially successful typewriter. Industrialization and corporate growth in the late 19th century produced a business environment for which the device was well suited. New communications technologies, such as the telegraph and telephone, facilitated geographic expansion and increased the speed with which business was conducted. The resulting increase in the volume of correspondence required messages to be produced quickly and legibly. Before the typewriter, clerks and copyists could write relatively quickly in shorthand or longhand. The comprehension of these scripts, however, required either special training or close concentration. Typesetting was used when legibility was important, but it was a slow and expensive process. The typewriter succeeded because it simultaneously addressed both issues.

The public was initially skeptical of the typewriter, and reactions included apathy and antagonism. Outside of large companies, letters generally did not need to be composed quickly; as the device was reliant upon its operator, it offered no automation. In business settings involving customer interaction, the unfamiliar machines were viewed with suspicion (as there existed the perception that mechanical devices could be rigged by unscrupulous merchants) and the presence of such a large object between the customer and employee "interrupted the 'personal touch'". Individuals receiving typewritten letters often found them insulting (as type implied they could not read handwriting) or impersonal, problems exacerbated by the all upper-case writing. The typewriter also precipitated privacy concerns, as recipients of letters of a personal nature believed a third-party operator or typesetter must have been involved in their composition.

=== Women and the typewriter ===
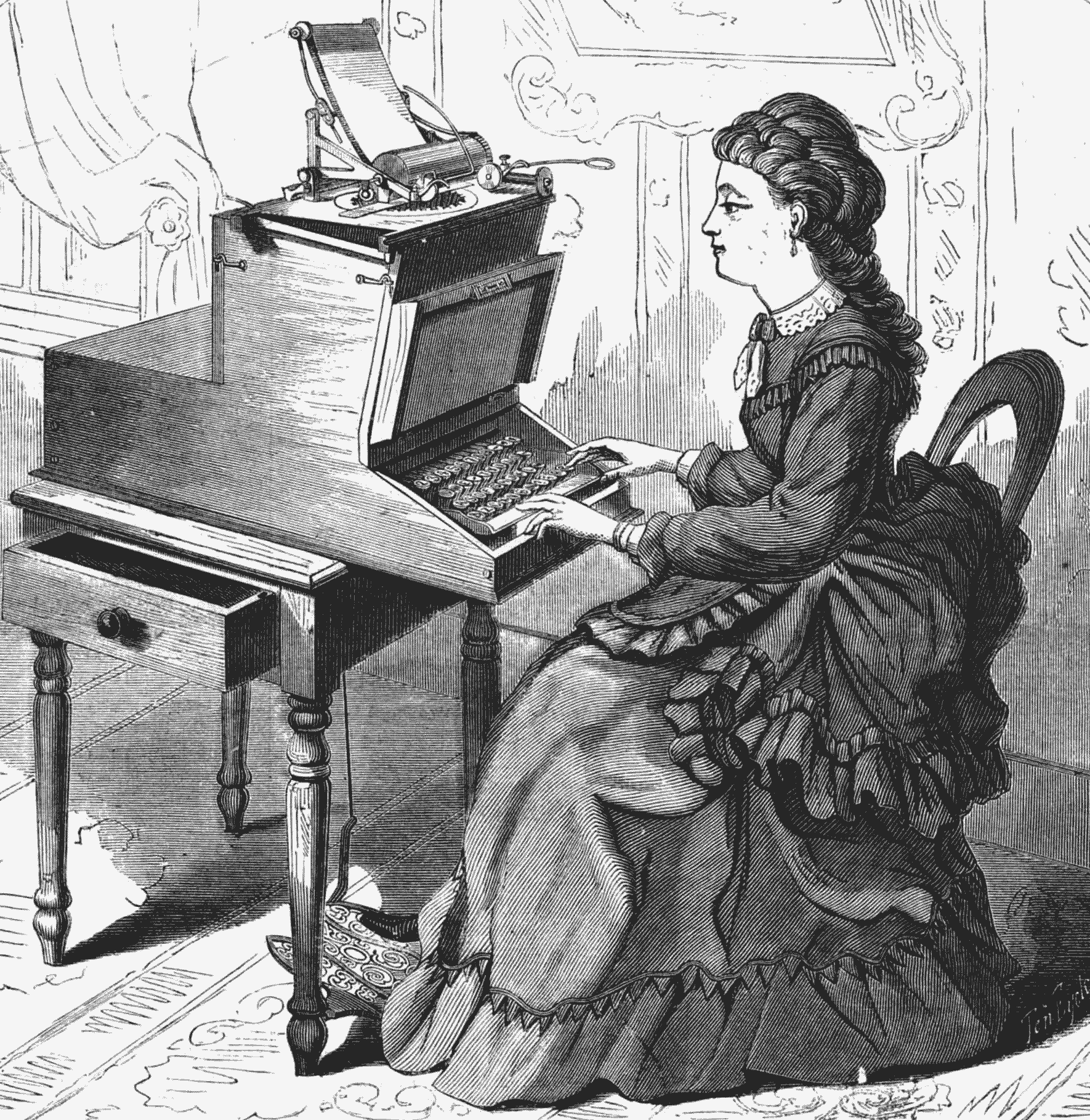
A female typist operates a Sholes and Glidden typewriter, as depicted in an 1872 Scientific American article.

The association of women with the typewriter may be linked to the way in which it was marketed. Before the typewriter was acquired by Remington, Sholes' daughter was employed to demonstrate the device and to appear in promotional images, which served as the basis for early advertisements. Remington's sales agents later marketed the machine with tactics including the use of attractive women to demonstrate the device at trade shows and in hotel lobbies. Depictions of female operators suggested the device was "easy enough for a woman" and suited for domestic use. Although also designed to allow Remington to maintain manufacturing efficiencies with its sewing machine division, the typewriter's aesthetics (the sewing machine stand and floral ornamentation) were further intended to facilitate its acceptance into the household.

A "major consequence" of the typewriter's development was the entrance of women into the clerical work force. Although women were already employed in factories and certain service industries in the 1880s, the typewriter facilitated an influx of women into office settings. Before the Young Women's Christian Association (YWCA) established the first typing school in 1881, women were trained by the manufacturer and their typing services provided to customers along with the machine. The expansion of correspondence and paper work made possible by the efficiency of typewriters also created demand for additional clerical workers. The low wages paid to women compared to that of men, often 50% (or less), made hiring women more attractive for businesses. As typing and stenography positions could pay up to ten times more than those in factories, women began to be more attracted to office work. While in 1874 less than 4% of clerical workers in the United States were women, by 1900, the number had increased to approximately 75%.

Before his death, Sholes remarked of the typewriter, "I do feel that I have done something for the women who have always had to work so hard. This will enable them more easily to earn a living."

== See also ==
- American Typewriter, a modern font based on the Sholes and Glidden typewriter font
- Dvorak, an alternative to the QWERTY keyboard layout
- Keyboard layout – Arrangement of keys on a typographic keyboard

== Notes ==
Inflation calculations in this article are based on McCusker (1997) and McCusker (1992).

== Bibliography ==
- Beeching, Wilfred A. (1974). Century of the Typewriter. New York: St. Martin's Press. ISBN 0-434-90120-2
- Bliven, Bruce, Jr. (1954). The Wonderful Writing Machine. New York: Random House.
- Burlingame, Roger (1976). Engines of Democracy. New York: Scribner. ISBN 0-405-07676-2
- Campbell-Kelly, Martin, et al. (2004). Computer: A History of the Information Machine. Boulder: Westview Press. ISBN 0-8133-4264-3
- Campbell-Kelly, Martin (2005). "The User-friendly Typewriter". The Rutherford Journal (Canterbury: University of Canterbury) 1
- Cortada, James W. (2000). Before the Computer: IBM, NCR, Burroughs, and Remington Rand and the Industry they Created, 1865–1956. Princeton: Princeton University Press. ISBN 0-691-05045-7
- Current, Richard N. (June 1949). "The Original Typewriter Enterprise 1867–1873". Wisconsin Magazine of History (Madison: State Historical Society of Wisconsin) 32 (4)
- Current, Richard N. (1954). The Typewriter and the Men Who Made It. Champaign: University of Illinois Press. ISBN 0-911160-88-4
- Current, Richard N. (1977). Wisconsin: A History. New York: W. W. Norton & Company. ISBN 0-252-07018-6
- Hoke, Donald (1979). "The Woman and the Typewriter: A Case Study in Technological Innovation and Social Change". Business and Economic History (Milwaukee: Milwaukee Public Museum) Series 2, 8
- Iles, George (1912). Leading American Inventors. New York: Henry Holt & Company
- Ingham, John N. (1983). Biographical Dictionary of American Business Leaders. Westport: Greenwood Publishing Group. ISBN 0-313-21362-3
- Krystal, Arthur (2007). The Half-life of an American Essayist. Boston: David R. Godine Publisher. ISBN 1-56792-328-3
- Lekberg, Charles (1972). "The Tyranny of Qwerty". Saturday Review of Science 55 (40)
- MacKenzie, I. Scott, et al. (2007). Text Entry Systems: Mobility, Accessibility, Universality. San Francisco: Elsevier. ISBN 0-12-373591-2
- Mayo, Anthony J., et al. (2007). Paths to Power: How Insiders and Outsiders Shaped American Business Leadership. Boston: Harvard Business Press. ISBN 1-4221-0198-3
- Melville, Arthur (1923). "The Machine Gun of Commerce". The Rotarian (Philadelphia: Rotary International) 23
- Miller, Donald L. (1997). City of the Century: The Epic of Chicago and the Making of America. New York: Simon and Schuster. ISBN 0-684-83138-4
- Oden, Charles Vonley (1917). Evolution of the Typewriter. New York: J.E. Hetsch
- Pool, Robert (1997). Beyond Engineering: How Society Shapes Technology. New York: Oxford University Press. ISBN 0-19-510772-1
- Post, Daniel R. (1981). Collector's Guide to Antique Typewriters. Arcadia: Post-Era Books. ISBN 0-911160-86-8
- Reid, James D. (1886). The Telegraph in American and Morse Memorial. New York: J. Polhemus
- Strong, Lucia Glidden (1925). The Descendants of Charles Glidden of Portsmouth and Exeter, New Hampshire. Boston
- Utterback, James M. (1999). Mastering the Dynamics of Innovation. Boston: Harvard Business Press. ISBN 0-87584-740-4
- Wosk, Julie (2001). Women and the Machine: Representations from the Spinning Wheel to the Electronic Age. Baltimore: Johns Hopkins University Press. ISBN 0-8018-6607-3
