= James Densmore =

Businessman and inventor (1820–1889)

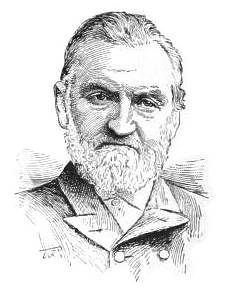
- Born: February 3, 1820; Moscow, New York, United States
- Died: September 16, 1889 (aged 69); Brooklyn, New York, United States

James Densmore (February 3, 1820 – September 16, 1889) was an American businessman and inventor. He was a business associate of Christopher Sholes, who along with Carlos Glidden and Samuel W. Soule helped contribute to inventing one of the first practical typewriters at a machine shop located in Milwaukee, Wisconsin.

It was believed that Densmore had suggested splitting up commonly used letter combinations in order to solve a jamming problem, but this called into question. This concept was later refined by Sholes later refined this concept, so it became known as the QWERTY key layout.

Densmore was a militant vegetarian. His diet consisted of mostly raw apples. His brother was physician Emmet Densmore.

Densmore also supported women's suffrage in Wisconsin. When he was the editor of the Oshkosh True Democrat the paper publicly supported women's right to vote.

Densmore is remembered for the enigmatic fraternal organization he envisioned in his will, known as The Densmore Foundation.

== Bibliography ==
- Johnson, Rossiter, et al. (1904). The Twentieth Century Biographical Dictionary of Notable Americans. The Biographical Society
- Youmans, Theodora W. (September 1921). "How Wisconsin Women Won the Ballot". The Wisconsin Magazine of History. 5 (1): 3–32. JSTOR 4630337.
