= Samuel Hale =

Samuel Hale may refer to:

- Samuel W. Hale (1823–1891), American manufacturer and politician in New Hampshire
- Samuel Hale Jr. (1800–1877), American merchant, judge and politician in Wisconsin
- Samuel Hale (settler) (1615–1693), founding settler of Hartford and Norwalk, Connecticut
