= Anthony Van Wyck =

American politician (1822–1900)

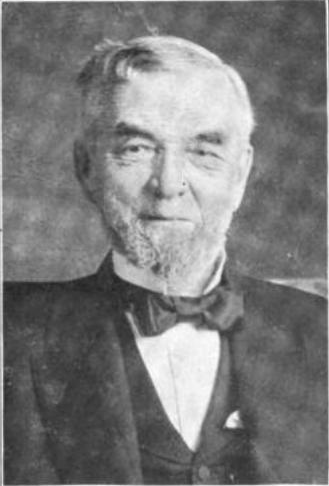

Member of the Wisconsin Senate from the 8th district
- In office January 1, 1868 – January 1, 1870
- Preceded by: Charles Sholes
- Succeeded by: Milton Pettit
- In office January 1, 1864 – January 1, 1866
- Preceded by: Herman Thorp
- Succeeded by: Charles Sholes

Personal details
- Born: Anthony Van Wyck; May 15, 1822 LaGrange, New York, US
- Died: December 22, 1900 (aged 78) Wauwatosa, Wisconsin, US
- Party: Republican
- Spouses: Margaret Theron Skeel; (m. 1849; died 1894)
- Children: 3
- Profession: Lawyer, politician

Anthony Van Wyck (May 15, 1822 – December 22, 1900) was an American lawyer, judge, and politician. He was a member of the Wisconsin State Senate from Kenosha County, Wisconsin.

== Biography ==
Van Wyck was born in LaGrange, New York. He graduated from Yale Law School in 1844. In 1849, Van Wyck married Margaret Theron Skeel (March 25, 1828 - June 22, 1894). They had three children. He moved to Davenport, Iowa in 1857, and to Kenosha, Wisconsin in 1860. Van Wyck died in Milwaukee, Wisconsin in 1900, aged 77.

== Career ==
Van Wyck was a member of the Senate from 1864 to 1865 and again from 1868 to 1869. In 1868, he was a candidate for the Republican nomination for Governor of Wisconsin, losing by one vote to incumbent Lucius Fairchild. Later, he was twice County Judge of Kenosha County, Wisconsin.
