= Giuseppe Ravizza =

Italian inventor

Giuseppe Ravizza (c. 1811–1885, Novara) was a prolific typewriter inventor. He spent nearly 40 years of his life obsessively grappling with the complexities of inventing a usable writing machine. He called his invention cembalo scrivano o macchina da scrivere a tasti because of its piano-type keys and keyboard. The story of the 16 models he produced between 1847 and the early 1880s is described in The Writing Machine and illustrated from Ravizza’s 1855 patent, which bears similarities to the later upstroke design of the Sholes and Glidden typewriter.

In 1868, the American Christopher Latham Sholes (1819–1890) patented, on behalf of Remington, a typewriter that was based on principles similar to those of the Ravizza machine. The Cembalo scrivano could be typed in upper or lower case, too, a feature not present in the Remington machine.
