= Clarence Seamans =

American typewriter manufacturer and executive

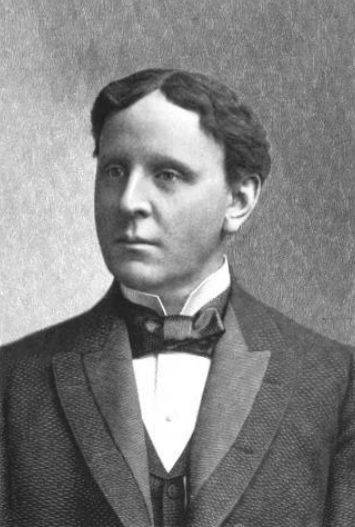
Clarence W. Seamans

Clarence Walker Seamans (June 5, 1854 – May 30, 1915) was an American typewriter manufacturer and executive of several organizations involved in the production and sale of the Remington typewriter, including the Union Typewriter Company and the Remington Typewriter Company.

== History ==
=== Early life ===
Seamans was born June 5, 1854, in Ilion, New York to Abner Clark Seamans and Caroline Matilda Williams. Seamans began work as a clerk at E. Remington and Sons, the firm at which his father was a purchasing agent, at the age of fifteen. (Note: Alternatively, Seamans is reported to have begun at the age of sixteen.) In 1875, he began a three-year stint of overseeing a silver mine in Bingham Canyon, Utah. Upon returning to the state of New York, Seamans became a bookkeeper and salesman at Fairbanks & Company, a scale manufacturer. Fairbanks had become the sole marketer of the Sholes and Glidden typewriter, produced by Seaman's former employer, E. Remington and Sons. After 1879, Seamans lived in Brooklyn with his wife Ida Gertrude Watson and their two daughters, Mabel and Dorothy.

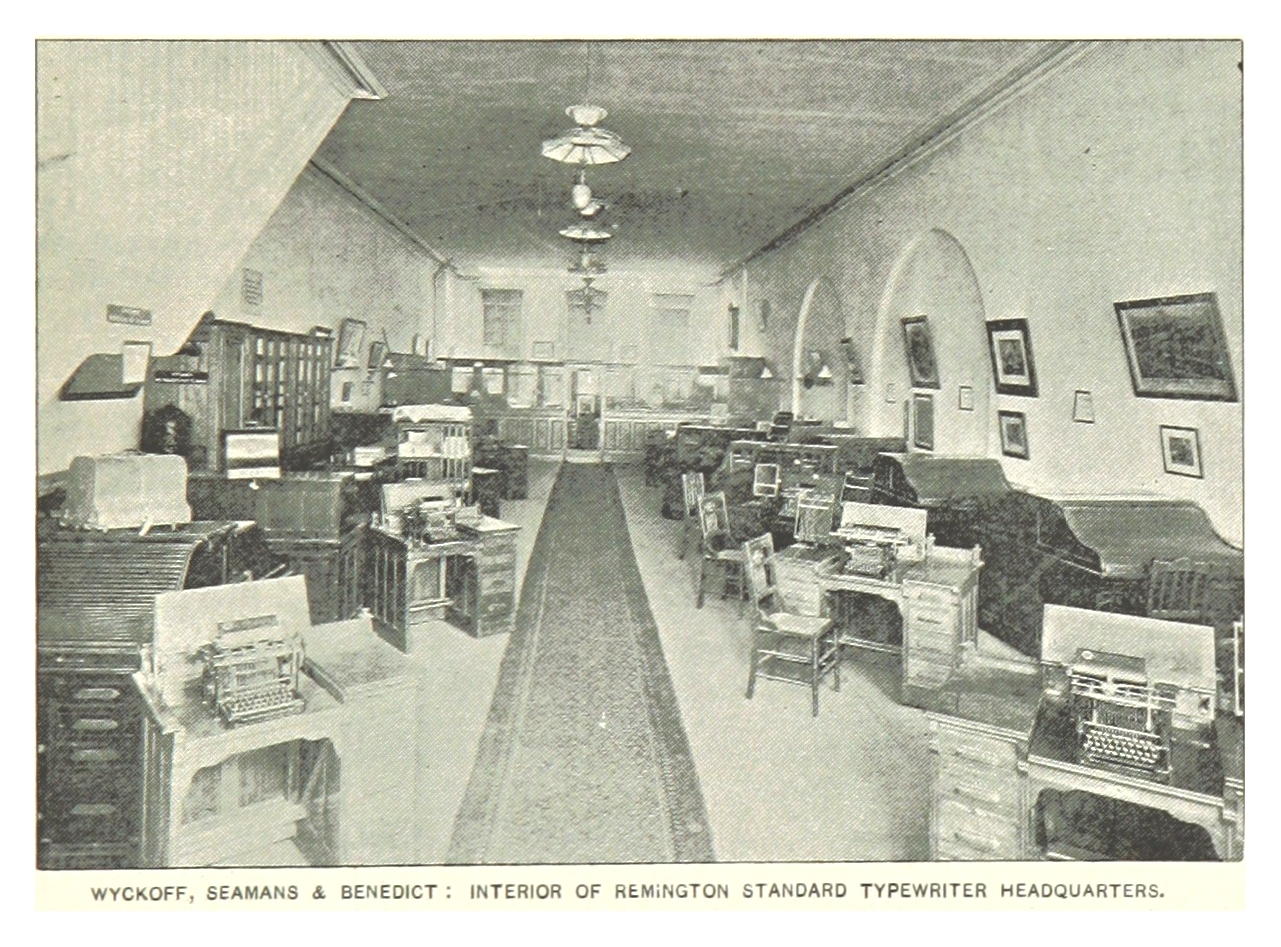
Headquarters of Remington Standard Typewriters

=== Involvement with the Remington typewriter ===
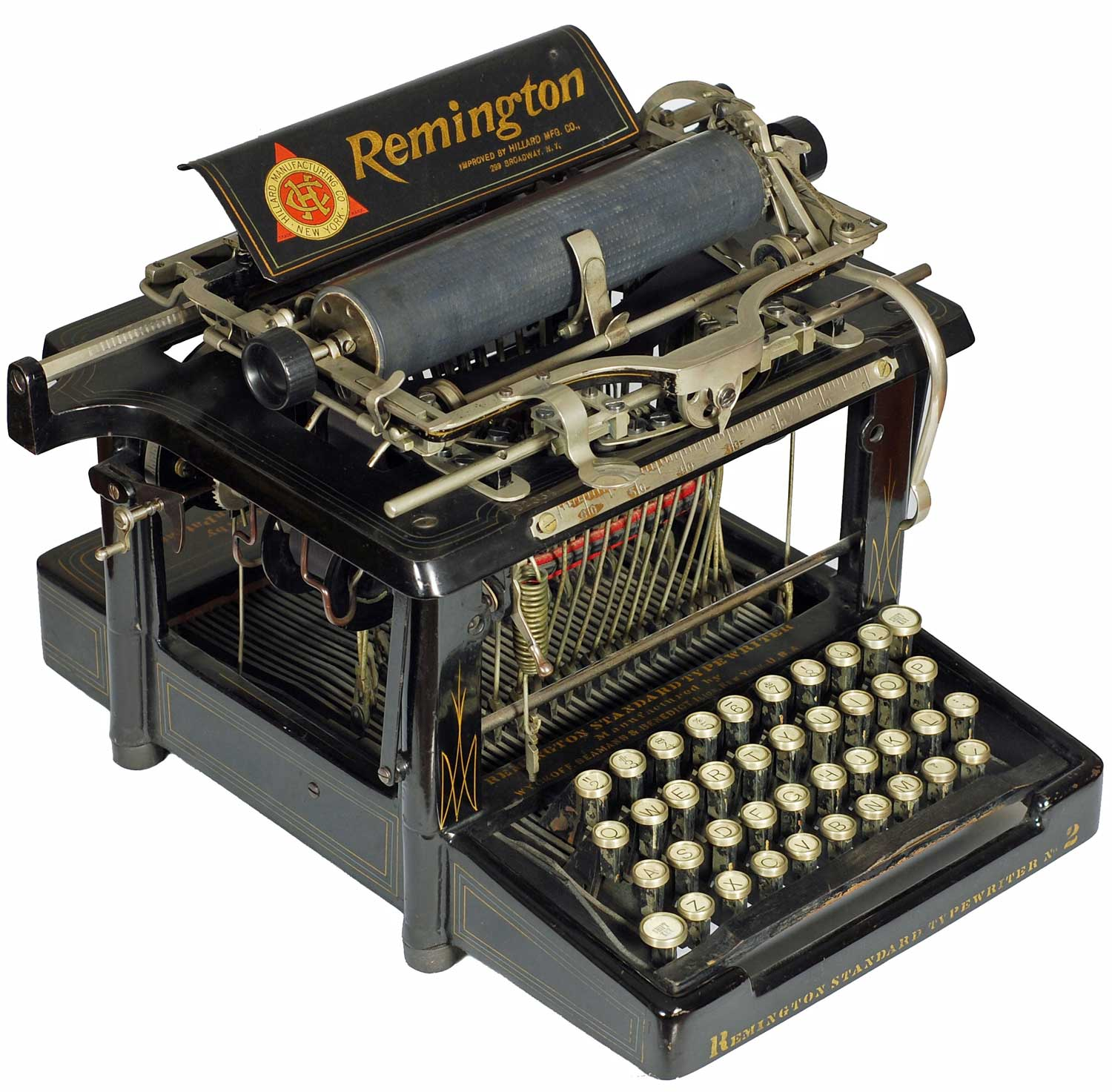
Remington 2 typewriter, 1878 - The best selling typewriter of its time

In 1881, marketing of the typewriter returned to Remington. Seamans had been a "star typewriter salesman" and was retained and made manager of sales. The following year, Seamans partnered with Harry H. Benedict, a Remington director, and William O. Wyckoff, a Remington sales agent, to form the firm of Wyckoff, Seamans & Benedict. In 1886, Wyckoff, Seamans & Benedict purchased the typewriter business from Remington and, in 1892, formed the Remington Standard Typewriter Company with Seamans as the treasurer and general manager. A year later, Seamans was made president of the Union Typewriter Company, a trust formed from the merger of Remington Standard with several prominent typewriter manufacturers. Seamans presided over the acquisition of the Wahl Adding Machine Company, which made Union the world's largest typewriter company. Seamans remained president until being elected to chairman of the board in 1913. During this time, Seamans held a director position at several trust companies and an insurance company.

Seamans died at his summer home in Pigeon Cove, Massachusetts on May 30, 1915.

== Bibliography ==
- Homans, James E., ed. (1918). "Seamans, Clarence Walker" . The Cyclopædia of American Biography. New York: The Press Association Compilers, Inc. pp. 517–518.
- Ingham, John N. (1983). Biographical Dictionary of American Business Leaders. Westport: Greenwood Publishing Group. ISBN 0-313-21362-3
- King, Moses (1899). Notable New Yorkers of 1896-1899'. New York: Bartlett & Company
- Leonard, John W., et al. (1909). Who's Who in New York City and State. 4. New York: L.R. Hamersly Company
- Masi, Frank T. (1985). The Typewriter Legend. Secaucas: Matsushita Electric Corporation of America. ISBN 0-9614386-0-6
