= Otis Colwell =

American merchant and politician (born c. 1797)

Member of the Wisconsin State Assembly from the Racine 4th district
- In office January 1, 1849 – January 7, 1850
- Preceded by: Julius L. Gilbert
- Succeeded by: Samuel Hale Jr.

Personal details
- Born: c. 1797 Massachusetts, U.S.
- Died: 1861 or later
- Party: Free Soil Party

Otis Colwell (c. 1797 – 1861 or later) was an American merchant and politician in the early years of the U.S. state of Wisconsin. He was a member of the Wisconsin State Assembly for the 1849 session, representing the village of Southport (now part of the city of Kenosha) and southeast Racine County (now eastern Kenosha County).

== Background ==
Colwell was born in Massachusetts approximately 1797 (in January 1849 he was 52 years of age). He came to Wisconsin Territory in 1844, and operated a store in Southport.

== Politics and legislature ==
In 1848 he was elected to the second session of the Wisconsin legislature from the district consisting of the Towns of Pike, Pleasant Prairie, and Southport, succeeding Julius L. Gilbert, a Democrat. At that time he is described as being 52 years old, as a native of Massachusetts, and a merchant. He was succeeded in the 1850 session by Samuel Hale, at that time a Democrat, but who would later join the Free Soil Party himself.

In 1852 he was one of two elected justices of the peace for what was now named the City of Kenosha.

== Later life ==
A house built for Colwell in 1853 is still standing, at what is now 6215 7th Avenue in the City of Kenosha.

Colwell spent a brief period (part of 1861) as Head Keeper of the Kenosha Light lighthouse in Kenosha Harbor; he was the second of three men to be Head Keeper in that year.

Wisconsin State Assembly
Preceded by Julius L. Gilbert	Member of the Wisconsin State Assembly from the Racine 4th district January 1, 1849 – January 7, 1850	Succeeded by Samuel Hale Jr.
