= Henry Johnson (Kenosha politician) =

American farmer & politician (1794–1868)

Member of the Wisconsin State Assembly from the Kenosha 1st district
- In office January 7, 1856 – January 5, 1857
- Preceded by: Charles C. Sholes
- Succeeded by: Frederick S. Lovell
- In office January 6, 1851 – January 5, 1852
- Preceded by: Samuel Hale Jr. (Racine 4th)
- Succeeded by: C. Latham Sholes

Member of the New York State Assembly from the Erie County district
- In office January 1, 1839 – January 1, 1840 Serving with Jacob A. Barker and Truman Cary
- Preceded by: Lewis F. Allen, Asa Warren, and Cyrenus Wilbur
- Succeeded by: Seth C. Hawley, Stephen Osborn, and Aaron Salisbury

Personal details
- Born: September 3, 1794 Williamstown, Vermont, U.S.
- Died: February 27, 1868 (aged 73) Somers, Wisconsin, U.S.
- Resting place: Vale Cemetery, Kenosha, Wisconsin
- Party: Republican; Whig (before 1854)
- Spouse: Violata Peckham born 1793; died 1855
- Children: Lavina (Brande); ^{born 1820; died 1893}; Horace M. Johnson; ^{born 1821; died 1909}; Hiram Johnson; ^{born 1823; died 1893}; Violata Johnson; ^{born 1825; died 1900}; Charles H. Johnson; ^{born 1829; died 1867}; Rebecca Maria Johnson; ^{born 1832; died 1910}; Edwin Johnson; ^{born 1835; died 1912}

Henry Johnson (September 3, 1794 – February 27, 1868) was an American farmer, Republican politician, and Wisconsin pioneer. He was instrumental in the founding of the Wisconsin State Agricultural Society, and served two terms in the Wisconsin State Assembly, representing eastern Kenosha County. Earlier in his life, he was a member of the New York State Legislature.

== Biography ==
Henry Johnson was born in Williamstown, Vermont, in 1794 and moved to Niagara County, New York in 1810, where he became established and started a family. By 1821 Johnson had become a prominent citizen in the newly formed Erie County, New York and was elected on the Whig Party ticket to the New York State Assembly for the 1839 session. In 1844 the family relocated to Southport (now the city of Kenosha, incorporated in 1850) in the Wisconsin Territory and then settled on a farm in the town of Pike (now the village of Somers in Kenosha County). At the time, this was part of a larger Racine County, since Kenosha County was established from part of Racine County as a separate entity by an act of the Wisconsin Legislature in January 1850. On April 28, 1848 Johnson attended the Whig Assembly District Convention where he was nominated for Assemblyman for the 1st Wisconsin Legislature but later lost the election to the Democratic candidate Julius L. Gilbert. The very next day April 29, 1848 Johnson attended the Whig Senatorial Convention in the Town of Salem. On October 26, 1850 Johnson was again nominated for assemblyman this time winning his election for the Whig Party ticket as one of the first two assemblymen for the newly formed Kenosha County and serving, for the first of two sessions, on the Wisconsin State Assembly for the 1851 session. On October 24, 1851 Johnson was nominated for Senator by the Whig Party at their county convention at Dutton's Tavern in the Town of Paris, this election he lost to the Democratic candidate John R. Sharpstein.

Johnson became prominent in his new state through his farming community. On January 3, 1850 he helped bring together a number of Kenosha County farmers to create the "Farmer's Club of Southport, Pleasant Prairie, Pike, Bristol and vicinity"—believed to be the first agricultural association in Wisconsin. Five months later, on June 3, 1850, the club was formalized as the Kenosha County Agricultural Society with a constitution and bylaws. Johnson was selected as the first president of the organization and later also served as corresponding secretary. As President of the Kenosha County Agricultural Society, Johnson attended a meeting in the State Assembly hall in Madison, Wisconsin, on March 8, 1851, which recommended the formation of a State Agricultural Society. Johnson took an active part in the meeting, and was appointed to a committee to draft a constitution for the State Agricultural Society. On March 12, the convention met again and approved the constitution drafted by Johnson's committee.

Between the establishment of the Kenosha Agricultural Society in Spring 1850 and the State Agricultural Society in Spring 1851, Johnson served on the 1851 session of the Wisconsin State Assembly representing Kenosha County's eastern district representing the towns of Pike (Somers), Pleasant Prairie, and Southport (Kenosha). Johnson remained a Whig until the creation of the Republican Party in 1854, and on October 26, 1955 was nominated and elected to another term in the Assembly for the 1856 session, running on the Republican ticket.

== Personal life and family ==
Henry Johnson was the third child of seven children born to Henry Johnson and Betsey Johnson (née Vorce). The elder Henry Johnson had served as a captain in the American Revolutionary War. Johnson's younger brother Isaac L. Johnson, niece Martha Johnson(daughter of brother Lewis), nephew Leonard Johnson(son of brother Lewis), brother-in-law Almon Tinkham(husband of sister Betsey) and several of Betsey and sister Freelove's children all relocated to Kenosha County, Wisconsin.

The younger Henry Johnson married Violata Peckham in Niagara County, New York, sometime before 1820, she died in 1855. They had seven children:

- Lavina (born 1820) married English American immigrant Frederick J. Brande, who was also a prominent Kenosha County farmer and an ally of Henry Johnson in the founding of the Kenosha Agricultural Society and State Agricultural Society. Brande held a number of local offices and owned an impressive farming estate, but committed suicide in 1889 after some financial problems.
- Horace M. (born 1821) became a farmer and butcher with his own estate in Sherburne County, Minnesota. He also served in the 1st Minnesota Infantry Regiment and 1st Minnesota Cavalry Regiment during the American Civil War.
- Hiram (born 1823) quit farming and became a teacher, then went into business in Milwaukee. He later moved to Madison, Wisconsin, where he worked as secretary of the Madison Manufacturing Company.
- Violata (born 1825)
- Charles H. (born 1829)
- Rebecca Maria (born 1832)
- Edwin (born 1835)

Henry Johnson died February 27, 1868. Henry and Violata are buried in Vale Cemetery in Kenosha County, Wisconsin.

New York State Assembly
Preceded by Lewis F. Allen, Asa Warren, and Cyrenus Wilbur	Member of the New York State Assembly from the Erie County district January 1, 1839 – January 1, 1840; With: Jacob A. Barker and Truman Cary	Succeeded by Seth C. Hawley, Stephen Osborn, and Aaron Salisbury
Wisconsin State Assembly
Preceded by Samuel Hale Jr. (Racine 4th district)	Member of the Wisconsin State Assembly from the Kenosha 1st district January 6, 1851 – January 5, 1852	Succeeded by C. Latham Sholes
Preceded by Charles C. Sholes	Member of the Wisconsin State Assembly from the Kenosha 1st district January 7, 1856 – January 5, 1857	Succeeded by Frederick S. Lovell
