= Charles Sholes =

American politician and newspaperman (1816–1867)

Charles C. Sholes
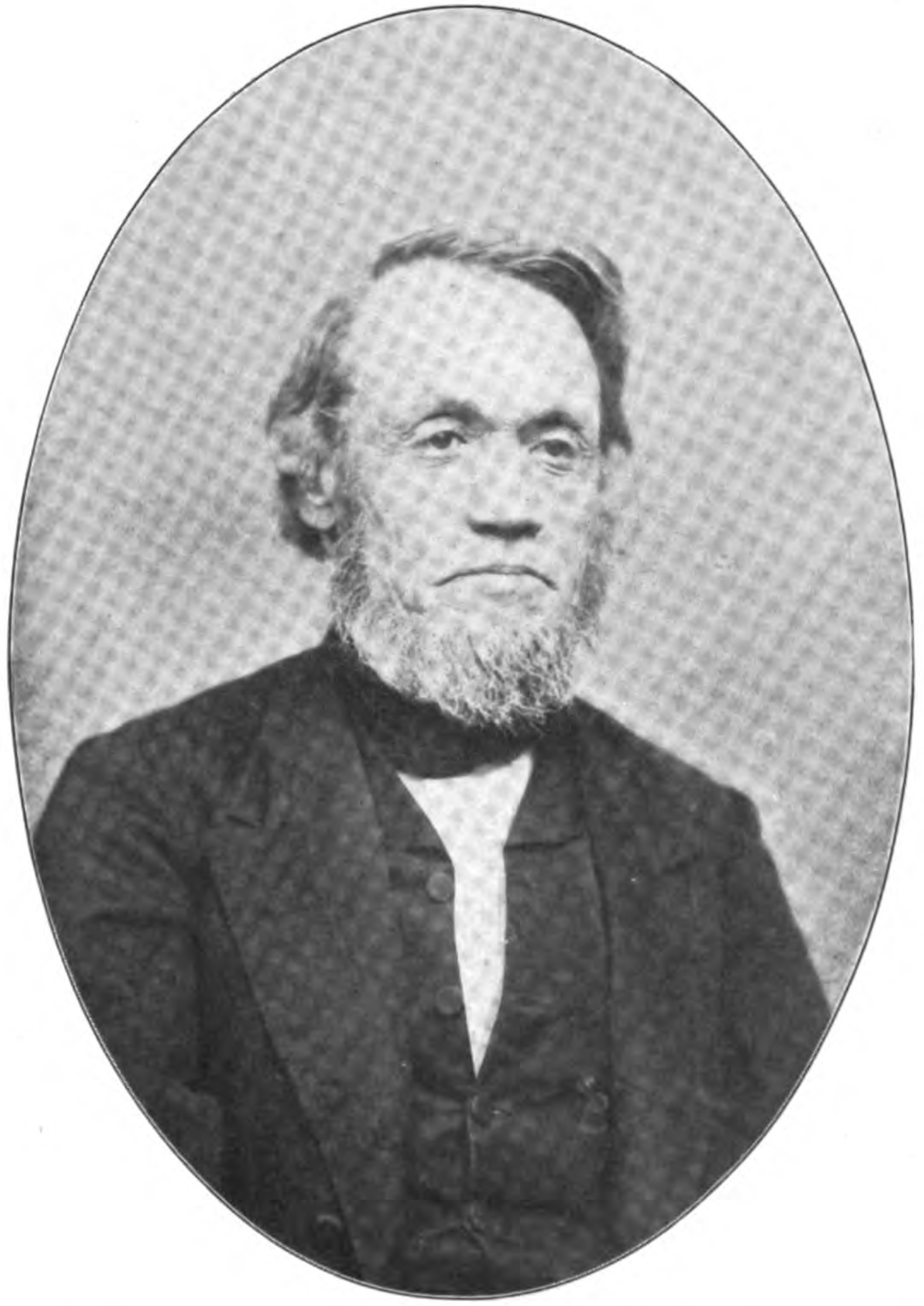

Member of the Wisconsin Senate from the 8th district
- In office January 10, 1866 – October 5, 1867
- Preceded by: Anthony Van Wyck
- Succeeded by: Anthony Van Wyck

8th Speaker of the Wisconsin State Assembly
- In office January 10, 1855 – January 9, 1856
- Preceded by: Frederick W. Horn
- Succeeded by: William H. Hull

Member of the Wisconsin State Assembly from the Kenosha 1st district
- In office January 1, 1855 – January 7, 1856
- Preceded by: Samuel Hale Jr.
- Succeeded by: Henry Johnson

3rd Mayor of Kenosha, Wisconsin
- In office April 1852 – April 1856
- Preceded by: David C. Gaskill
- Succeeded by: Volney Hughes

Member of the House of Representatives of the Wisconsin Territory from Brown County
- In office November 6, 1837 – December 7, 1840
House terms
In office November 5, 1838 – December 7, 1840 Serving with Ebenezer Childs, Barlow Shackleford, & Jacob W. Conroe
Succeeded by	Mason C. Darling, Albert Gallatin Ellis, & David Giddings
In office November 6, 1837 – November 5, 1838 Serving with Ebenezer Childs & George McWilliams
Preceded by	Albert Gallatin Ellis, Ebenezer Childs, & George McWilliams

Personal details
- Born: Charles Clark Sholes; January 8, 1816 Norwich, Connecticut, U.S.
- Died: October 5, 1867 (aged 51) Kenosha, Wisconsin, U.S.
- Resting place: Green Ridge Cemetery, Kenosha
- Party: National Union (1866–1867); Republican (1850s); Liberty Party (1843–1848); Democratic (before 1843)
- Spouse: Sarah Elizabeth McKinney (m. 1845–1867)
- Children: Frank Sholes^{(b. 1848; died 1850)}; Edward Sholes^{(b. 1849; died 1907)}; Winnie L. Sholes^{(b. 1851; died 1866)}; Charles Sholes^{(b. 1855; died 1856)}; Harry O. Sholes^{(b. 1856; died 1877)}; Helen Kate (Chapman)^{(b. 1856; died 1894)}; Madge Sholes^{(b. 1861; died 1877)}; William Orran Sholes^{(b. 1862; died 1941)}; Mary Jane (Berger)^{(b. 1864; died 1899)}; Susy Sholes^{(b. 1867; died 1868)}
- Parents: Orrin Sholes (father); Catherine (Cook) Sholes (mother)
- Relatives: Christopher Latham Sholes (brother)
- Occupation: Newspaper publisher, politician

Charles Clark Sholes (January 8, 1816 – October 5, 1867) was an American newspaper publisher, politician, and Wisconsin pioneer. He was a publisher of some of the earliest newspapers in Wisconsin, the Green Bay Wisconsin Democrat, the Madison Wisconsin Enquirer, and the Kenosha Telegraph.

He served as the 3rd mayor of Kenosha, Wisconsin, and represented Kenosha for two years in the Wisconsin Senate (1866, 1867) and for one year in the Wisconsin State Assembly (1855); during his term in the Assembly, he also served as the 8th speaker of the Wisconsin State Assembly—he was the first Republican to serve as speaker of the Wisconsin Assembly. Before Wisconsin statehood, he represented the vast northeast quadrant of the Wisconsin Territory in the Territory House of Representatives during the 1st and 2nd legislative assemblies. Politically, Sholes was originally a Democrat, but joined the anti-slavery Liberty Party in the 1840s before becoming a Republican in the 1850s.

His younger brother, C. Latham Sholes, was the inventor of the QWERTY keyboard and also a notable pioneer politician and newspaper publisher in Kenosha, Wisconsin.

== Biography ==
Born in Norwich, Connecticut, to Orrin and Catherine Sholes, he worked for a time in Pennsylvania and learned printing. In 1836, he moved to Green Bay, in the Wisconsin Territory and published his own paper, the Green Bay Wisconsin Democrat. He was also a publisher of the first newspaper in Madison, the Wisconsin Enquirer. While in Green Bay, he first entered politics, serving as a Democrat in the lower chamber of the Wisconsin Territorial Assembly during the first and second sessions (1837–1840).

In 1840, he moved his plant and paper to Kenosha, then known as "Southport", and renamed the paper the Telegraph. In Kenosha, his brother Christopher Latham Sholes managed the paper, and eventually purchased the business from Charles.

In 1843, he foreclosed a lien on the Wisconsin Enquirer and moved that company to Milwaukee, where the paper was renamed the Milwaukee Democrat. That same year, however, Sholes stopped production of that paper and began publishing a new paper called the American Freeman, affiliated with the abolitionist Liberty Party. Sholes was managing editor of that paper until 1846.

In 1847, Sholes returned to Kenosha and made his home there. He was elected Mayor of Kenosha, serving from 1852 to 1856. And was elected as a Republican to represent Kenosha in the Wisconsin State Assembly for 1855, he was also chosen as Speaker of the Assembly that year. Later that year, he was the Republican nominee for Lieutenant Governor of Wisconsin, but was defeated by Democrat Arthur MacArthur Sr., who went on to briefly serve as Governor due to a controversy over election fraud in the gubernatorial election.

Along with Zalmon G. Simmons, he was the founder of the Wisconsin State Telegraph Company, and in 1855 he became president of that company.

Sholes returned to politics one more time in 1865, earning election to the Wisconsin State Senate on the National Union Party ticket for the 1866 and 1867 sessions.

He died in 1867, after the legislative session was over, but before the official expiration of his term as Senator.

He was married to Sarah Elizabeth McKinney. Together they had ten children, though only four lived to adulthood.

Wisconsin State Assembly
Preceded by Samuel Hale Jr.	Member of the Wisconsin State Assembly from the Kenosha 1st district January 1, 1855 – January 7, 1856	Succeeded by Henry Johnson
Preceded by Frederick W. Horn	Speaker of the Wisconsin State Assembly; January 1, 1855 – January 7, 1856	Succeeded by William H. Hull
Wisconsin Senate
Preceded by Anthony Van Wyck	Member of the Wisconsin Senate from the 8th district January 1, 1866 – October 5, 1867	Succeeded by Anthony Van Wyck
Political offices
Preceded by David C. Gaskill	Mayor of Kenosha, Wisconsin; 1852 – 1856	Succeeded by Volney Hughes
