= Samuel Hale Jr. =

19th century American businessman, judge and politician

Samuel Hale
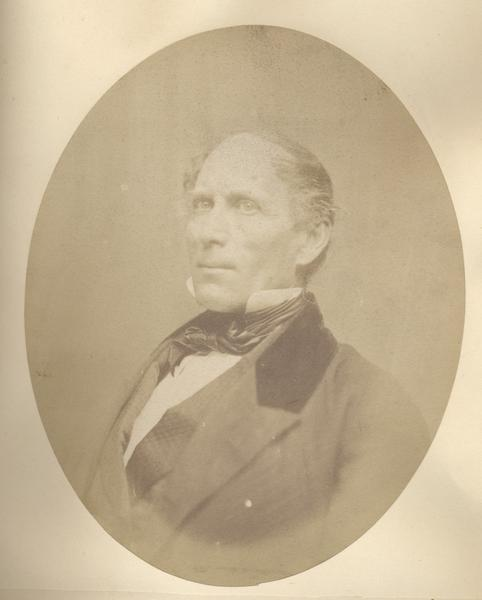
- Photograph by Fuller and Johnson

Member of the Wisconsin State Assembly from the Kenosha 1st district
- In office January 2, 1854 – January 1, 1855
- Preceded by: C. Latham Sholes
- Succeeded by: Charles C. Sholes

Member of the Wisconsin State Assembly from the Racine 4th district
- In office January 9, 1850 – January 8, 1851
- Preceded by: Otis Colwell
- Succeeded by: Henry Johnson (Kenosha 1st)

County Judge of Racine County
- In office January 1, 1840 – January 1, 1843
- Preceded by: Volney French
- Succeeded by: Ezra Birchard

Personal details
- Born: Samuel Hale Jr. September 13, 1800 Paris, New York, U.S.
- Died: January 23, 1877 (aged 76) Chicago, Illinois, U.S.
- Resting place: Green Ridge Cemetery; Kenosha, Wisconsin
- Party: Democratic; Free Soil Party (1853–1855)
- Spouse: Mary Barnard
- Parents: Samuel Hale Sr. (father); Hannah Munson (mother)

Samuel Hale Jr. (September 13, 1800 – January 23, 1877) was an American businessman, politician, and pioneer settler of Kenosha, Wisconsin. He served two non-consecutive terms in the Wisconsin State Assembly, and held various other local offices.

== Background, business and civic life ==
Hale was born in the town of Paris, in Oneida County, New York. Sources differ on the year of his birth, with some indicating 1799 and others saying 1800. He came to the Wisconsin Territory on May 26, 1836, and settled at the small southern town then known as "Pike Creek". The next year, the town's name would be changed to "Southport," and, in 1850, finally the settlement would be incorporated as a city with its present name—Kenosha.

He became part of the community quickly; when in December 1836 the territorial legislature incorporated the Milwaukee and Racine Mutual Fire Insurance Company, he was enumerated as one of the initial subscribers. By the winter of 1838, he was part-owner of Hale & Bullen, one of the only four stores in settlement of 200 people—his partner was John Bullen, whose brother William Bullen was one of the other three merchants in town. In the autumn of 1839 he was one of the charter members of the "Southport Lyceum", a society supposedly educational in intent. Generally, he regarded it as being more recreational in purpose. As of June 1840, he was advertising his lumber business; and by September 1841, S. Hale Jr. & Co. were advertising their dry goods.

His father, Samuel Hale, one of the first settlers of Oneida County, died in Southport on August 25, 1842; but it is unknown whether he had accompanied his son to the Territory, or was merely there on a visit.

In the spring of 1843, Hale sold his business to N. R. Allen, who in October of the same year married one Mary Hale: a native of Oneida County, New York, and presumably Samuel Jr.'s sister. By 1858, Hale was on the board of directors of the City Bank of Kenosha, as well as being an officer of the local Masonic lodge.

In the early years of Southport, the settlement had no harbor or wharf facilities. An 1857 Early History of Kenosha recounts, "A 'lighter,' capable of carrying several tons weight, was built in the spring of 1836, and kept on the beach of the Lake; whenever a steamer or sail vessel anchored off shore, for the purpose of landing passengers or freight, whether in the daytime or nighttime, the lighter was launched from the beach and manned. The. lighter being heavy, it required a large portion of the able-bodied men of the town to handle it. Among the most active on such occasions, to man the lighter, was Judge Hale. Many of the citizens of Kenosha have still vivid recollections of hearing his stentorian voice, at midnight hours, calling for men to launch the lighter; when his voice did not suffice to awaken the sleepers, a heavy kick against the door never failed to bring them to a sense of wakefulness."

== Public office ==
The new Racine County was organized on December 7, 1836 from the southern portion of Milwaukee County, and encompassed what would later become Kenosha County. When the first elections were held on April 4, 1837, Hale was one of the previously appointed justices of the peace who made up the Board of Elections. He was elected at that time to be one of the three members of the county board of supervisors. By April 1838, the title had been changed to "Commissioner", and Hale was the only one of the three members of the initial body to be retained. He remained on the board until the fall of 1839, when a new election was held. From 1840 to 1842, he served as "judge of probate", a position later renamed county judge Contemporary press reports indicate that the division between northern and southern Racine County, rather than partisan politics, was the deciding factor in many of these elections, until the county was divided in 1850.

In 1849, Hale was elected as a Democrat to his first term in the Assembly, from one of the districts of what was then still Racine County. (The Obed Hale who was elected to the Assembly in 1850 from the new Kenosha County as a Freesoiler was not a relative of his.)

In 1853, he was elected as a member of the Assembly from Kenosha County as a member of the Free Soil Party.

By 1860, he had gone back to the Democratic Party, and was one of the contenders for delegate to the 1860 Democratic National Convention

== Later years and death ==
Hale became a Republican due to the American Civil War, and eventually moved to Chicago with his business partner John V. Ayer. In 1875, Hale was employed as vice president of the Joseph H. Brown Iron and Steel Company.

Hale died in Chicago on January 23, 1877, and was buried in Kenosha.
