= Ebenezer Childs =

American politician

Ebenezer Childs (April 3, 1797 – December 15, 1864) was an American pioneer, builder and legislator.

Childs was born in Barre, Massachusetts, on April 3, 1797, and was orphaned as a child. He left Massachusetts in 1816 for New York in order to avoid taxes, and then made his way to Ohio and then Michigan, where he made a profit smuggling whiskey into the military garrison. In 1820, Childs settled in Green Bay, Michigan Territory, where he built homes and sawmills. Eventually he opened a store and was a fur trapper. In 1825, he built the first frame house in Wisconsin for James Duane Doty.

In 1829, he was appointed sheriff of Brown County, Michigan Territory, a post he held until 1836. He was in the Wisconsin Territorial House of Representatives from 1836 to 1840 and was appointed sergeant at arms for the Wisconsin Territorial Council from 1842 to 1843. In 1838, he was named commissary general for Wisconsin Territory and was named a colonel. Childs went to Copper Harbor, Michigan, in 1845, where he built the first sawmill in the Upper Peninsula. He moved to Milwaukee, Wisconsin, in 1852 and to La Crosse, Wisconsin, where he had property.

He died in La Crosse on December 15, 1864.

== Sources ==
- Recollections of Colonel Ebenezer Childs, La Crosse, Wisconsin, 1858
