= Carlos Glidden =

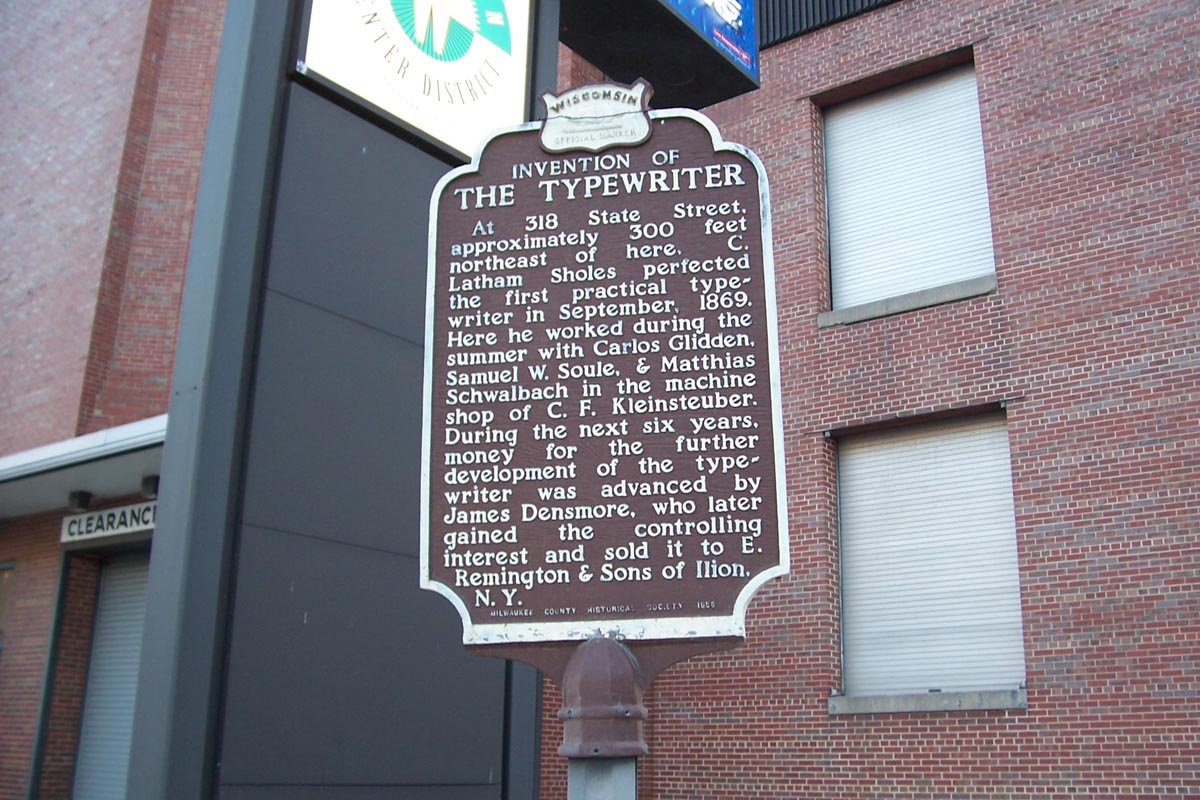
Wisconsin Historical Marker

Carlos Glidden (November 8, 1834 – March 11, 1877), along with Christopher Sholes, Frank Haven Hall, and Samuel W. Soule, invented the first practical typewriter at a machine shop in Milwaukee, Wisconsin, US. He kept on improving the typewriter until he died.
