= Samuel W. Soulé =

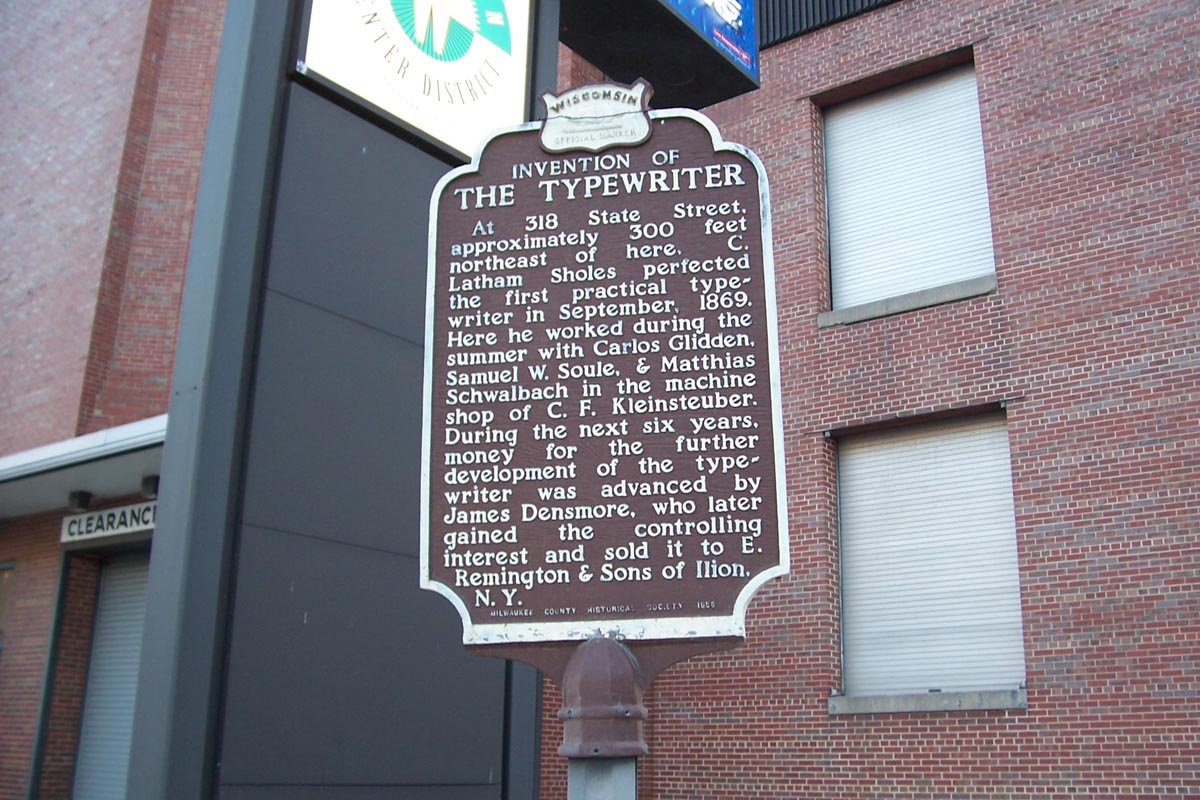
Wisconsin Historical Marker

Samuel Willard Soulé (January 25, 1830 – July 12, 1875), along with Christopher Latham Sholes and Carlos Glidden, was the inventor of the first practical typewriter in the US at a machine shop located in Milwaukee, Wisconsin, US in 1869.
