= Julius L. Gilbert =

American politician

Julius L. Gilbert was a member of the Wisconsin State Assembly.

== Biography ==
Gilbert was born in March 1814. He died on October 20, 1863.

== Career ==
Gilbert was a member of the Assembly during the 1848 session. He was a Democrat.
