= Christopher Latham Sholes =

American inventor and politician (1819–1890)

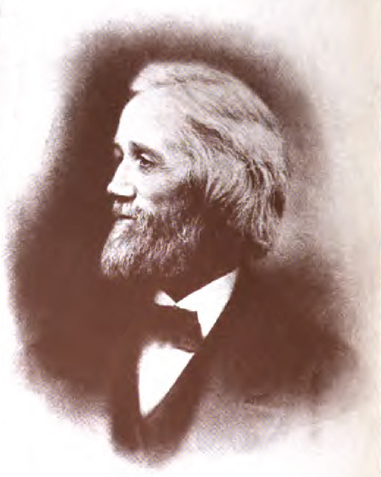

Member of the Wisconsin Senate
- In office January 7, 1856 – January 4, 1858
- Preceded by: Francis Paddock
- Succeeded by: Samuel R. McClellan
- Constituency: 8th Senate district
- In office June 5, 1848 – January 7, 1850
- Preceded by: District established
- Succeeded by: Elijah Steele
- Constituency: 16th Senate district

Member of the Wisconsin State Assembly from the Kenosha 1st district
- In office January 5, 1852 – January 2, 1854
- Preceded by: Henry Johnson
- Succeeded by: Samuel Hale Jr.

Personal details
- Born: Christopher Latham Sholes; February 14, 1819 Mooresburg, Pennsylvania, U.S.
- Died: February 17, 1890 (aged 71) Milwaukee, Wisconsin, U.S.
- Cause of death: Tuberculosis
- Resting place: Forest Home Cemetery, Milwaukee
- Party: Republican; Free Soil (before 1854); Democratic (before 1850)
- Spouse: Mary Jane McKinney (m. 1841; died 1888)
- Children: Charles Latham Sholes^{(b. 1844; died 1902)}; Clarence Gordon Sholes^{(b. 1845; died 1926)}; Mary Katherine (Tyrrell)^{(b. 1847; died 1896)}; Frederick Sholes^{(b. 1847; died 1933)}; Louis C. Sholes^{(b. 1849; died 1914)}; Elizabeth (Gilmore)^{(b. 1852; died 1937)}; Lillian (Fortier)^{(b. 1856; died 1941)}; George Orrin Sholes^{(b. 1859; died 1894)}; Jessie Sholes^{(b. 1861; died 1898)}; Zalmon Gilbert Sholes^{(b. 1864; died 1917)}
- Parents: Orrin Sholes (father); Catherine (Cook) Sholes (mother)
- Relatives: Charles Sholes (brother)
- Occupation: Printer, inventor, legislator
- Known for: "The Father of the typewriter," inventor of the QWERTY keyboard

Christopher Latham Sholes (February 14, 1819 – February 17, 1890) was an American inventor, newspaper publisher, politician, and Wisconsin pioneer. He was the inventor of the QWERTY keyboard, and—along with Samuel W. Soule, Carlos Glidden, and John Pratt—has been described as one of the inventors of the first typewriter in the United States. In his time, he went by the names C. Latham Sholes, Latham Sholes, or C. L. Sholes, but never "Christopher Sholes" or "Christopher L. Sholes".

He was one of the earliest American settlers in what is now Kenosha County, Wisconsin; he represented Kenosha County for four years in the Wisconsin Senate (1848, 1849, 1856, 1857) and for two years in the state Assembly (1852, 1853). Politically, he was originally a Democrat, but joined the Free Soil Party when it split from the Democrats over the issue of slavery, then became a Republican in the 1850s.

His elder brother, Charles Sholes, was also a notable newspaper publisher, pioneer, and politician in Kenosha, Wisconsin.

== Youth and political career ==
Born in Mooresburg, in Montour County, Pennsylvania, Sholes moved to nearby Danville and worked there as an apprentice to a printer. After completing his apprenticeship, Sholes moved to Milwaukee, Wisconsin Territory, in 1837, and later to Southport, Wisconsin (present-day Kenosha).

He became a newspaper publisher and politician, serving in the Wisconsin State Senate from 1848 to 1849 as a Democrat, in the Wisconsin State Assembly from 1852 to 1853 as a Free Soiler, and again in the Senate as a Republican from 1856 to 1857. He was instrumental in the successful movement to abolish capital punishment in Wisconsin; his newspaper, The Kenosha Telegraph, reported on the trial of John McCaffary in 1851, and then in 1853 he led the campaign in the Wisconsin State Assembly. Also noteworthy was Sholes' part in the massive railroad corruption scheme which permeated the legislature in 1856. Sholes was one of a small number of legislators who actually refused the bribe.

== The "Voree Record" ==
In 1845, Sholes was working as editor of the Southport Telegraph, a small newspaper in Kenosha. During this time, he heard about the alleged discovery of the Voree Record, a set of three minuscule brass plates unearthed by James J. Strang, a would-be successor to Joseph Smith, founder of the Latter Day Saint movement. Strang asserted that this proved that he was a true prophet of God, and he invited the public to call upon him and see the plates for themselves. Sholes accordingly visited Strang, examined his "Voree Record," and wrote an article about their meeting. He indicated that while he could not accept Strang's plates or his prophetic claims, Strang himself seemed to be "honest and earnest" and his disciples were "among the most honest and intelligent men in the neighborhood." As for the "record" itself, Sholes indicated that he was "content to have no opinion about it."

== Inventing the typewriter ==
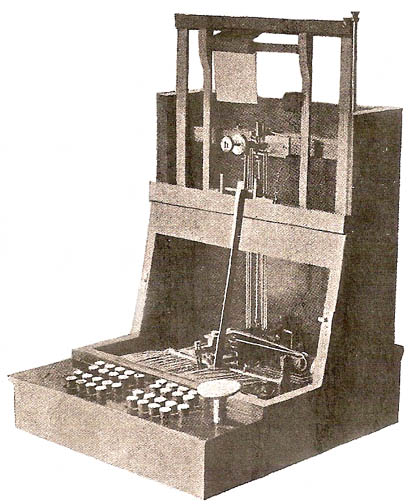
John Pratt's Pterotype, the inspiration for Sholes in July 1867, a version close to the stock model advocated by fellow inventor Frank Haven Hall

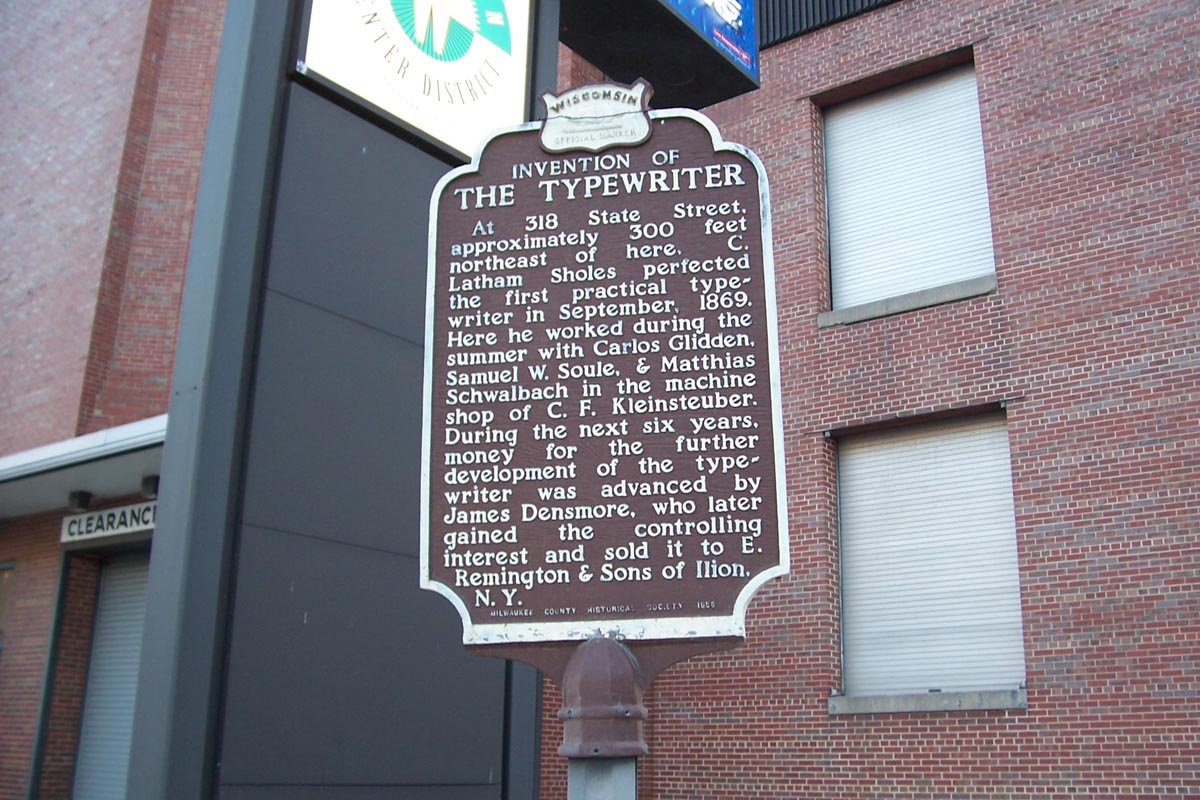
Wisconsin Historical Marker

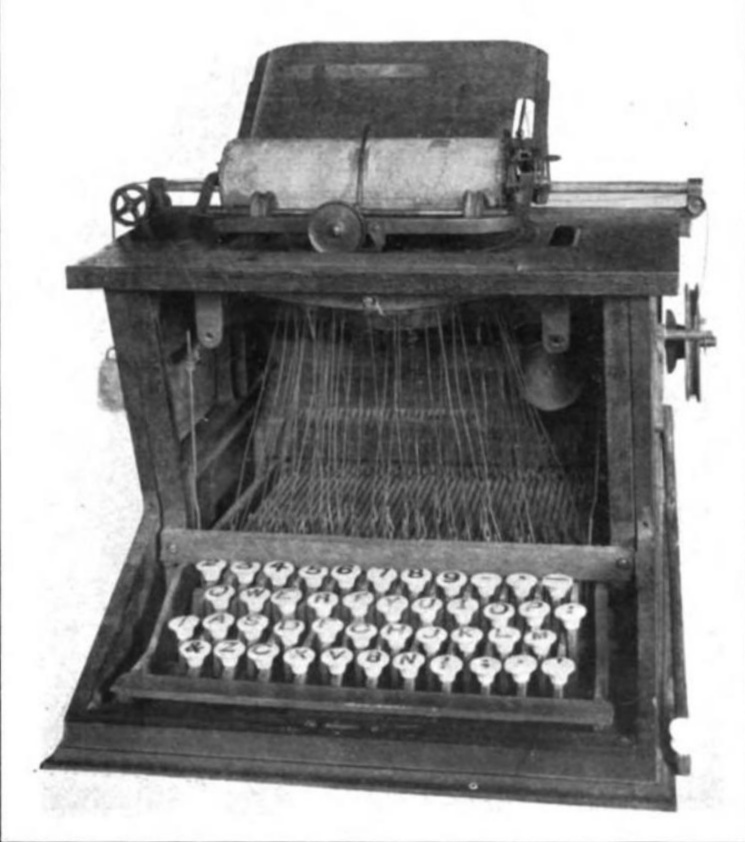
Sholes typewriter, 1873 at Buffalo History Museum

Typewriters with various keyboards had been invented as early as 1714 by Henry Mill and reinvented in various forms throughout the 1800s. It is believed that Sholes drew inspiration from the inventions of others, including those of Frank Haven Hall, Samuel W. Soule, Carlos Glidden, Giuseppe Ravizza and, in particular, John Pratt, whose is mentioned in an 1867 Scientific American article Glidden is known to have shown Sholes. Sholes' typewriter improved on both the simplicity and efficiency of previous models, which led to his successful patent and commercial success.

Sholes had moved to Milwaukee and became the editor of a newspaper. Following a strike by compositors at his printing press, he tried building a machine for typesetting, but this was a failure and he quickly abandoned the idea. He arrived at the typewriter through a different route. His initial goal was to create a machine to number pages of a book, tickets and so on. He began work on this at a machine shop in Milwaukee, together with fellow printer Samuel W. Soule. They patented a numbering machine on November 13, 1866.

Sholes and Soule showed their machine to Carlos Glidden, a lawyer and amateur inventor at the machine shop who was working on a mechanical plow. Glidden wondered if the machine could not be made to produce letters and words as well. Further inspiration came in July 1867, when Sholes came across a short note in Scientific American describing the "Pterotype", a prototype typewriter that had been invented by John Pratt. From the description, Sholes decided that the Pterotype was too complex and set out to make his own machine, whose name he got from the article: the typewriting machine, or typewriter.

For this project, Soule was again enlisted and Glidden joined them as a third partner to provide funding. The Scientific American article (unillustrated) had figuratively used the phrase "literary piano"; the first model that the trio built had a keyboard literally resembling a piano. It had black keys and white keys, laid out in two rows. It did not contain keys for the numerals 0 or 1 because the letters O and I were deemed sufficient:

  3 5 7 9 N O P Q R S T U V W X Y Z
 2 4 6 8 . A B C D E F G H I J K L M

The first row was made of ivory and the second of ebony, the rest of the framework was wooden. Despite the evident prior art by Pratt, it was in this same form that Sholes, Glidden and Soule were granted patents for their invention on June 23, 1868 and July 14. The first document to be produced on a typewriter was a contract that Sholes had written, in his capacity as the comptroller for the city of Milwaukee. Machines similar to Sholes' had been previously used by the blind for embossing, but by Sholes' time the inked ribbon had been invented, which made typewriting in its current form possible.

At this stage, the Sholes-Glidden-Soule typewriter was only one among dozens of similar inventions. They wrote hundreds of letters on their machine to various people, one of whom was James Densmore of Meadville, Pennsylvania. Densmore believed that the typewriter would be highly profitable, and offered to buy a share of the patent, without even having seen the machine. The trio immediately sold him one-fourth of the patent in return for his paying all their expenses so far. When Densmore eventually examined the machine in March 1867, he declared that it was good for nothing in its current form, and urged them to start improving it. Discouraged, Soule and Glidden left the project, leaving Sholes and Densmore in sole possession of the patent.

Realizing that stenographers would be among the first and most important users of the machine, and therefore best in a position to judge its suitability, they sent experimental versions to a few stenographers. The most important of them was James O. Clephane of Washington D.C., who tried the instruments as no one else had tried them, subjecting them to such unsparing tests that he destroyed them, one after another, as fast as they could be made and sent to him. His judgments were similarly caustic, causing Sholes to lose his patience and temper. But Densmore insisted that this was exactly what they needed:

This candid fault-finding is just what we need. We had better have it now than after we begin manufacturing. Where Clephane points out a weak lever or rod let us make it strong. Where a spacer or an inker works stiffly, let us make it work smoothly. Then, depend upon Clephane for all the praise we deserve.

Sholes took this advice and set to improve the machine at every iteration, until they were satisfied that Clephane had taught them everything he could. By this time, they had manufactured 50 machines or so, at an average cost of $250 (equivalent to almost $5,000 in 2020). They decided to have the machine examined by an expert mechanic, who directed them to E. Remington and Sons (which later became the Remington Arms Company), manufacturers of firearms, sewing machines and farm tools. In early 1873, they approached Remington, who decided to buy the patent from them. Sholes sold his half for $12,000, while Densmore, still a stronger believer in the machine, insisted on a royalty, which would eventually fetch him $1.5 million.

Sholes returned to Milwaukee and continued to work on new improvements for the typewriter throughout the 1870s, which included the QWERTY keyboard (1873). James Densmore had suggested splitting up commonly used letter combinations in order to solve a jamming problem caused by the slow method of recovering from a keystroke: weights, not springs, returned all parts to the "rest" position. This concept was later refined by Sholes and the resulting QWERTY layout is still used today on both typewriters and English language computer keyboards, although the jamming problem no longer exists.

== Personal life and family ==
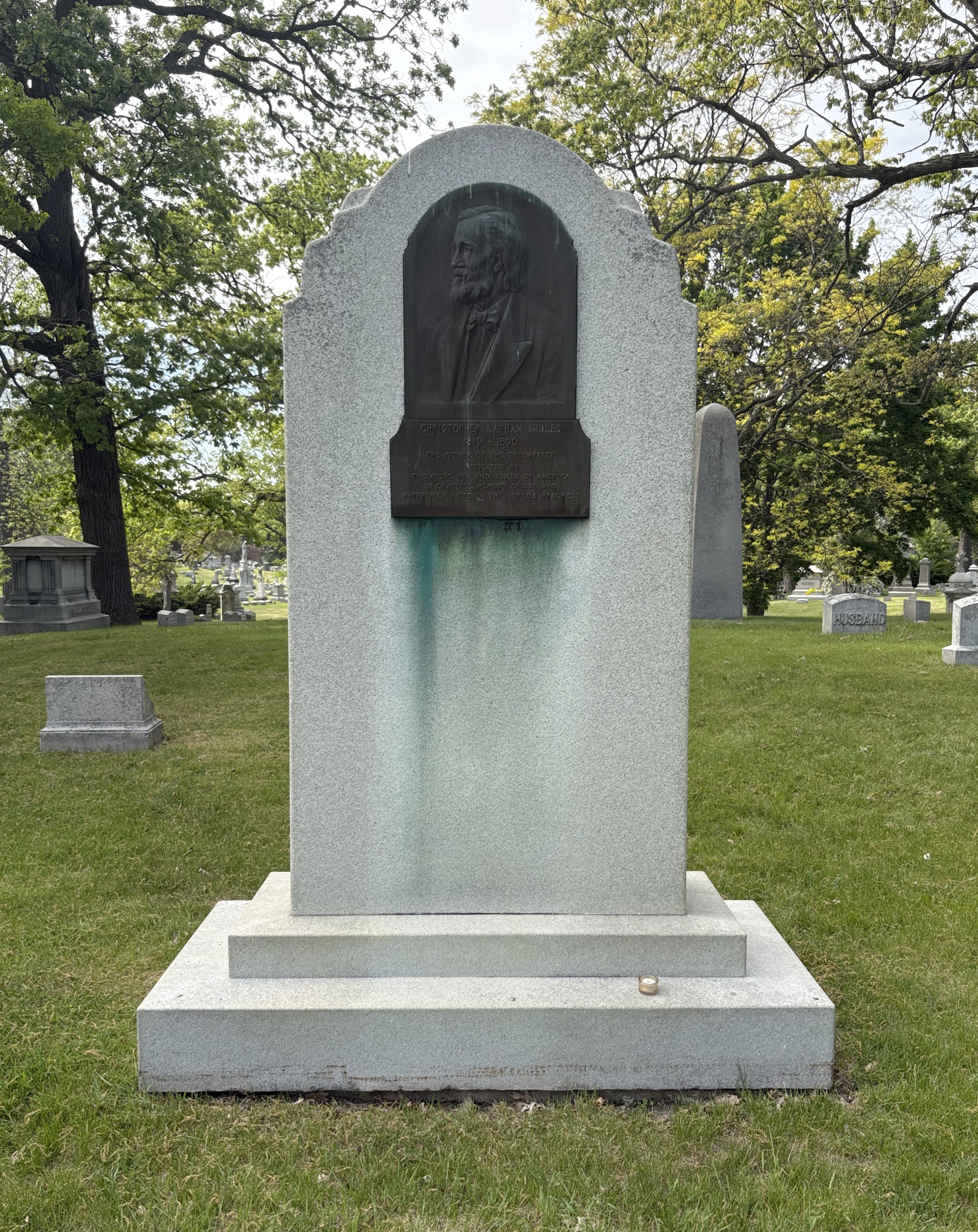
Sholes' grave at Forest Home Cemetery

C. Latham Sholes was the third of four known children born to Orrin Sholes and his second wife, Catherine (née Cook). Sholes' elder brother, Charles Sholes, was the first in the family to move to the Wisconsin Territory, and became a notable politician and newspaper publisher in Kenosha, serving as mayor, state representative, and state senator. Their father, Orrin Sholes, followed the sons to Wisconsin about 1843.

On February 4, 1841, C. Latham Sholes married Mary Jane McKinney at Green Bay, Wisconsin. They were married for 47 years before his wife's death in 1888; they had ten children together, all of which survived them.

Sholes died on February 17, 1890, after battling tuberculosis for nine years. He is buried at Milwaukee's historic Forest Home Cemetery.

== Citations ==
- Anonymous (April 24, 2011). "Hall Braille Writer". American Printing House for the Blind, Inc. Archived from the original on April 27, 2012.
- Fitzpatrick, Doyle (1970). "The King Strang Story". National Heritage.
- Foulke, Arthur Toye (1961). Mr. Typewriter: A biography of Christopher Latham Sholes. Boston: Christopher Publishing House. p. 137 – via Internet Archives.
- Hendrickson, Walter B. (1956). "The Three Lives of Frank H. Hall" (PDF). Journal of the Illinois State Historical Society. 49 (3). University of Illinois Press. Archived from the original (PDF) on August 6, 2010.
- Iles, George (1912). Leading American Inventors. New York: Henry Holt and Company.
- Larson, Erik (2004). A Devil in the White City: Murder, Magic, and Madness at the Fair that Changed America. New York: Vintage Books, a Division of Random House, Inc. p. 291 (Adobe epub book). ISBN 9781400076314.
- Mares, G.C. (1909). The history of the typewriter, successor to the pen: An illustrated account of the origin, rise, and development of the writing machine. London: Guilbert Putnam. Reprinted by Post-era Books, Arcadia, CA, 1985.
- Rehr, Darryl. "The First Typewriter". The QWERTY Connection. Archived from the original on November 3, 1999.
- Who invented the typewriter?
- Sholes and Glidden typewriter
- US 79265, Sholes, C. L., issued 1868
- US 79868, Sholes, C. L., issued 1868
- US 182511, Sholes, C. L., issued 1876
- US 199382, Sholes, C. L., issued 1878
- US 200321, Sholes, C. L., issued 1878
- US 207557, Sholes, C. L., issued 1878
- US 207558, Sholes, C. L., issued 1878
- US 207559, Sholes, C. L., issued 1878
- Weller, Charles Edward (1918). The Early History of the Typewriter. Chase & Shepard, printers. p. 75.
- "Sholes, Christopher Pichon 1819–1890". Dictionary. Wisconsin Historical Society. Archived from the original on February 10, 2009.

Wisconsin State Assembly
Preceded by Henry Johnson	Member of the Wisconsin State Assembly from the Kenosha 1st district January 5, 1852 – January 2, 1854	Succeeded by Samuel Hale Jr.
Wisconsin Senate
New state government	Member of the Wisconsin Senate from the 16th district June 5, 1848 – January 7, 1850	Succeeded by Elijah Steele
Preceded by Francis Paddock	Member of the Wisconsin Senate from the 8th district January 7, 1856 – January 4, 1858	Succeeded by Samuel R. McClellan
