= List of United States tornadoes from January to February 2008 =

This page documents all tornadoes confirmed by various weather forecast offices of the National Weather Service in the United States from January to February 2008.

== January ==
Confirmed tornadoes by Enhanced Fujita rating
EFU	EF0	EF1	EF2	EF3	EF4	EF5	Total
0	32	34	8	8	0	0	82

=== January 7 event ===
List of confirmed tornadoes – Monday, January 7, 2008 (Note: All dates are based on the local time zone where the tornado touched down; however, all times are in Coordinated Universal Time for consistency.)
EF#	Location	County / Parish	State	Start Coord.	Time (UTC)	Path length	Max width	Damage (Note: All damage totals are in 2008 USD unless otherwise stated.)	Summary
EF0	SW of Lowry City	St. Clair	MO	38.1196°N 93.7683°W	2022–2023	0.07 mi (0.11 km)	20 yd (18 m)	$0	A few trees were damaged.
EF0	SE of Lincoln	Benton	MO	38.3636°N 93.2987°W	2054–2055	0.17 mi (0.27 km)	25 yd (23 m)	$20,000	A local newspaper reported a brief tornado touchdown that heavily damaged a pole barn.
EF3	N of Poplar Grove to NNE of Harvard	Boone, McHenry	IL	42.3874°N 88.83°W	2130–2148	13.2 mi (21.2 km)	100 yd (91 m)	$4,000,000	A shed, a house, and other structures had sections of their roofing ripped off. A large barn was destroyed while a second, poorly constructed one was blown over. A two-story farm house and associated garage were leveled. Several other buildings were severely damaged. A second garage was blown down, a moving freight train was partially derailed, and numerous trees were snapped or uprooted. A semi-trailer was flipped.
EF0	SSW of Mexico	Audrain	MO	39.0687°N 91.9518°W	2155–2156	0.3 mi (0.48 km)	40 yd (37 m)	Unknown	A machine shed and several trees were damaged; numerous tree limbs were downed.
EF3	NE of Pell Lake to NNW of Paddock Lake	Walworth, Kenosha	WI	42.5488°N 88.3334°W	2202–2217	10.78 mi (17.35 km)	200 yd (180 m)	$13,810,000	In Walworth County, three structures sustained minor damage and two structures sustained moderate damage. After crossing into Kenosha County, the tornado impacted Wheatland; 77 homes were affected, 25 sustained minor damage, 27 sustained major damage, and 25 were completely destroyed. In Brighton, 10 homes were affected, 3 sustained minor damage, 3 sustained major damage, and 4 were completely destroyed. Numerous trees were snapped, uprooted, or debarked. Damage to some structures suggested an EF4 rating, but lack of proper anchoring prevented an upgrade. This became the earliest confirmed tornado in Wisconsin.
EF1	Kenosha	Kenosha	WI	42.624°N 87.8659°W	2239–2243	2.48 mi (3.99 km)	75 yd (69 m)	$7,930,000	Two homes sustained minor damage and one home sustained major damage in Somers. In Kenosha, 1 home was affected, 21 sustained minor damage, 6 sustained major damage, and 5 were completely destroyed; a church was destroyed as well. Several power lines were toppled, and dozens of trees were snapped or uprooted.
EF2	SW of Aurora	Barry	MO	36.8159°N 94.008°W	2306–2325	12.43 mi (20.00 km)	200 yd (180 m)	$500,000	Eight mobile homes were destroyed in a mobile home park. Additional houses and farm outbuildings were damaged.
EF1	SSE of Mackinaw	Tazewell	IL	40.5011°N 89.35°W	2322–2325	3 mi (4.8 km)	100 yd (91 m)	$30,000	A pole barn was destroyed while a house and other outbuildings were damaged. A chain link fence and a few tree limbs were downed.
EF0	E of Pineville	McDonald	MO	36.5914°N 94.3264°W	2350–2351	0.25 mi (0.40 km)	20 yd (18 m)	$0	A few trees sustained minor damage.
EF2	Northwestern Republic	Greene	MO	37.1065°N 93.5319°W	2357–0005	6.44 mi (10.36 km)	200 yd (180 m)	$2,000,000	Nearly 15 houses were severely damaged or destroyed. An elementary school sustained major damage to its roof.
EF3	NE of Springfield to E of Lebanon	Greene, Webster, Laclede	MO	37.2754°N 93.1644°W	0029–0133	50.39 mi (81.09 km)	300 yd (270 m)	$19,000,000	3 deaths – A long-tracked and significant tornado caused extensive damage to homes, trees, and outbuildings. One death occurred in rural Greene County while an additional two occurred in Webster County.
EF0	WSW of Republic	Lawrence, Christian	MO	37.0253°N 93.7302°W	0128–0138	6.43 mi (10.35 km)	50 yd (46 m)	$75,000	A few farm houses and outbuildings were damaged.
EF2	NE of Springfield to WNW of Marshfield	Greene, Webster	MO	37.223°N 93.1744°W	0132–0156	15.29 mi (24.61 km)	300 yd (270 m)	$2,000,000	Several homes and outbuildings sustained severe damage.
EF0	N of Bland	Gasconade	MO	38.3878°N 91.636°W	0150–0151	0.28 mi (0.45 km)	50 yd (46 m)	$0	Several trees were uprooted and tree limbs snapped.
EF0	S of Hiwasse	Benton	AR	36.4011°N 94.33°W	0205	0.1 mi (0.16 km)	50 yd (46 m)	$0	Multiple trained storm spotters observed a brief tornado over open country.
EF3	SSE of Dixon	Pulaski, Phelps	MO	36.4011°N 94.33°W	0206–0219	6.44 mi (10.36 km)	400 yd (370 m)	$1,110,000	In Pulaski County, a few homes and outbuildings were destroyed, injuring three people. In Phelps County, one home and several outbuildings were destroyed.
EF0	SW of Watts	Adair	OK	36.0791°N 94.6207°W	0208	0.1 mi (0.16 km)	50 yd (46 m)	$0	Multiple trained storm spotters observed a brief tornado over open country.
EF1	W of Washburn	McDonald, Barry	MO	36.5165°N 94.1439°W	0215–0229	7.43 mi (11.96 km)	100 yd (91 m)	$300,000	Numerous trees and a few structures were heavily damaged or destroyed.
EF0	WNW of Clarksville	Pike	MO	39.3665°N 91.0555°W	0230–0235	4.98 mi (8.01 km)	40 yd (37 m)	$0	Sporadic tree damage was observed.
EF0	W of Nebo	Pike	IL	39.4289°N 90.8439°W	0240–0243	2.35 mi (3.78 km)	40 yd (37 m)	$0	Sporadic tree damage was observed.
EF1	ENE of Elkland	Webster, Dallas	MO	37.4409°N 92.9631°W	0242–0248	5.24 mi (8.43 km)	150 yd (140 m)	$50,000	A home, several outbuildings, and trees were damaged.
EF0	E of Centerton	Benton	AR	36.35°N 94.2081°W	0250	0.1 mi (0.16 km)	50 yd (46 m)	$0	Multiple trained storm spotters reported a brief tornado over open country.
EF2	SW of Lebanon	Laclede	MO	37.5708°N 92.7979°W	0300–0308	5.44 mi (8.75 km)	300 yd (270 m)	$100,000	A home and numerous outbuildings were destroyed.
EF0	W of Seligman	Barry	MO	36.5141°N 93.9932°W	0312–0313	0.12 mi (0.19 km)	20 yd (18 m)	$0	A few trees were damaged.
EF1	S of Nixa	Christian	MO	36.967°N 93.3042°W	0336–0337	0.36 mi (0.58 km)	100 yd (91 m)	$200,000	Numerous homes were damaged and two mobile homes were destroyed. A woman was injured after being hit by flying debris.
EF1	N of Doolittle to S of Belle	Phelps, Maries	MO	38.0115°N 91.8924°W	0340–0458	15.06 mi (24.24 km)	100 yd (91 m)	$5,005,000	In Phelps County, one home sustained roof damage and numerous trees were damaged. In Maries County, approximately 40 structures were damaged, including a mobile home that was destroyed. Four airplanes were damaged at Rolla National Airport, where an ASOS station measured a gust of 96 mph (154 km/h).
EF0	S of Marshfield	Webster	MO	37.1154°N 93.0032°W	0357–0410	10.63 mi (17.11 km)	50 yd (46 m)	$8,000	A few outbuildings and trees sustained minor damage.
EF0	SSW of Oaks	Cherokee	OK	36.0505°N 94.9753°W	0428–0430	1.8 mi (2.9 km)	500 yd (460 m)	$25,000	Two barns and the roofs of several houses were damaged. A number of trees were uprooted.

=== January 8 event ===
List of confirmed tornadoes – Tuesday, January 8, 2008
EF#	Location	County / Parish	State	Start Coord.	Time (UTC)	Path length	Max width	Damage	Summary
EF1	NW of Gentry	Benton	AR	36.3007°N 94.5181°W	0509–0512	2.6 mi (4.2 km)	85 yd (78 m)	$0	Extensive tree damage was observed.
EF0	NE of Porter	Wagoner	OK	35.8905°N 95.4947°W	0538	0.5 mi (0.80 km)	75 yd (69 m)	$0	Extensive tree damage occurred.
EF0	NE of Wagoner	Wagoner	OK	35.9063°N 95.3105°W	0554–0558	2.7 mi (4.3 km)	100 yd (91 m)	$0	Extensive tree damage occurred.
EF1	SSW of Cassville	Barry	MO	36.6114°N 93.9458°W	0822–0826	4.83 mi (7.77 km)	100 yd (91 m)	$300,000	A few houses and outbuildings, as well as numerous trees, sustained damage.
EF1	S of Crane	Barry, Stone	MO	36.8104°N 93.6722°W	0831–0844	12.14 mi (19.54 km)	200 yd (180 m)	$2,000,000	Poultry barns, sheds, and outbuildings were heavily damaged or destroyed. Trees were damaged.
EF1	Springfield	Greene	MO	37.2137°N 93.2808°W	0837–0838	1.13 mi (1.82 km)	50 yd (46 m)	$50,000	A warehouse and a Krispy Kream donut sign were completely destroyed, and several homes sustained minor damage.
EF1	Highlandville	Christian	MO	36.93°N 93.3077°W	0850–0856	4.98 mi (8.01 km)	100 yd (91 m)	$250,000	Numerous structures, several outbuildings, and several highway advertisement signs were damaged.
EF0	W of Kirbyville	Taney	MO	36.6293°N 93.266°W	0901–0903	2.88 mi (4.63 km)	20 yd (18 m)	$75,000	Three condominiums at a golf resort and a mobile home park sustained damage.
EF0	ESE of Marshfield	Webster	MO	37.2795°N 92.8496°W	0916–0920	7.2 mi (11.6 km)	50 yd (46 m)	$15,000	Weak structure and tree damage was observed.
EF0	NNW of Ava	Douglas	MO	36.9803°N 92.8142°W	0917–0926	9.65 mi (15.53 km)	50 yd (46 m)	$75,000	Several barns and outbuildings were damaged or destroyed, and numerous trees were snapped or uprooted.
EF2	ENE of Marshfield	Webster	MO	37.3418°N 92.8633°W	0918–0922	4.73 mi (7.61 km)	150 yd (140 m)	$750,000	Several homes and outbuildings were destroyed.
EF1	NW of Vanzant	Douglas	MO	37.0375°N 92.3658°W	0943–0945	2.23 mi (3.59 km)	75 yd (69 m)	$125,000	A mobile home was moved off its foundation, and significant tree damage was observed.
EF1	WSW of Houston	Wright, Texas	MO	37.1904°N 92.302°W	0945–0953	11.95 mi (19.23 km)	150 yd (140 m)	$200,000	A few barns and outbuildings were damaged.
EF0	NNE of Pottersville	Howell	MO	36.7568°N 91.9931°W	1020–1021	0.36 mi (0.58 km)	20 yd (18 m)	$1,000	Two outbuildings and a mobile home were damaged.
EF1	ESE of Summersville	Shannon	MO	37.133°N 91.5177°W	1027–1028	2.27 mi (3.65 km)	200 yd (180 m)	$1,000	Numerous trees were snapped and uprooted.
EF1	NNE of Winona	Shannon	MO	37.1563°N 91.3117°W	1038–1047	9.83 mi (15.82 km)	200 yd (180 m)	$75,000	Two barns and a garage were destroyed, and numerous trees were snapped or uprooted.
EF0	S of Alton	Oregon	MO	36.6723°N 91.4224°W	1059–1100	1.1 mi (1.8 km)	50 yd (46 m)	$1,000	A few outbuildings were damaged, and a barn sheltering several new motorcycles at a motorcycle shop was destroyed.
EF2	SSW of Moreland to SW of Clinton	Pope, Conway, Van Buren	AR	35.3541°N 93.0075°W	1426–1458	20.46 mi (32.93 km)	440 yd (400 m)	$5,350,000	1 death – A strong tornado began in Pope County, affecting 42 structures: 6 sustained minor damage, 29 sustained moderate to heavy damage, and 7 were destroyed. Six chicken houses, two barns, and a number of outbuildings were destroyed. A travel trailer and motor home were overturned, and one death occurred when a mobile home was destroyed. In Conway County, 3 homes were destroyed and 12 others sustained light to heavy damage. A church and 10 other structures were destroyed, and a cemetery, three natural gas well sites, and 13 additional structures were damaged. Hundreds of trees were downed.
EF1	E of Bloomfield	Stoddard	MO	36.847°N 89.836°W	1840–1845	4.78 mi (7.69 km)	120 yd (110 m)	$250,000	A house was heavily damaged, with its roof ripped off and tossed 100–200 yd (91–183 m). Three outbuildings and an equipment shed were destroyed, a trailer was thrown about 75 yd (69 m), approximately 10 power poles were snapped, windows of vehicles were broken, and a few large trees were snapped. A pump house was thrown into a propane tank, causing a propane leak.
EF0	NNW of Parkin	Cross	AR	35.2629°N 90.6479°W	1926–1936	10.61 mi (17.08 km)	150 yd (140 m)	$25,000	A roof was ripped off a mobile home, and trees and power lines were downed. Several farm water rig pivots were blown over.
EF1	NNW of Gilmore	Poinsett	AR	35.4445°N 90.2921°W	1952–1953	0.15 mi (0.24 km)	25 yd (23 m)	$50,000	A utility and parking shed was completely destroyed, two homes sustained roof damage, and numerous trees were downed.
EF1	NNE of Wilson	Mississippi	AR	35.6406°N 89.9784°W	2020–2025	3.51 mi (5.65 km)	75 yd (69 m)	$100,000	Numerous homes sustained roof damage, many trees were downed, a metal farm equipment building was shifted off its foundation, and a vehicle was destroyed.
EF1	NW of Halls	Lauderdale, Dyer	TN	35.9066°N 89.4623°W	2058–2106	7.81 mi (12.57 km)	25 yd (23 m)	$270,000	A mobile home was shifted off its foundation and destroyed. Numerous homes sustained substantial damage or were shifted off their foundations. Fences were damaged, a garage was collapsed, a machine shed was destroyed, several power lines were downed, and numerous trees were snapped or uprooted.
EF0	W of Fayette	Jefferson	MS	31.6949°N 91.2411°W	2130–2137	4.86 mi (7.82 km)	50 yd (46 m)	$0	Several trees were downed.
EF1	NW of Harrisville to S of Puckett	Simpson	MS	31.99°N 90.1°W	2337–0015	19.41 mi (31.24 km)	125 yd (114 m)	$600,000	A framed house had a large section of its roof ripped off. One outbuilding was destroyed and blown away while several others sustained damage to their tin roofs. A home sustained shingle damage, power lines were downed, and numerous trees were snapped or uprooted.
EF0	SE of Puckett	Rankin	MS	32.06°N 89.75°W	0011–0012	0.4 mi (0.64 km)	50 yd (46 m)	$12,000	A home sustained shingle damage and trees were downed.

=== January 10 event ===
List of confirmed tornadoes – Thursday, January 10, 2008
EF#	Location	County / Parish	State	Start Coord.	Time (UTC)	Path length	Max width	Damage	Summary
EF1	SSE of Rocky Springs	Claiborne	MS	32.0741°N 90.8003°W	1727–1732	3.14 mi (5.05 km)	250 yd (230 m)	$80,000	Significant tree damage occurred in a very rural area, with hundreds of trees snapped and uprooted, and a few power poles were downed as well.
EF3	WNW of Pickens to ENE of Goodman	Holmes, Attala	MS	32.8954°N 89.9979°W	1751–1805	9.73 mi (15.66 km)	1,320 yd (1,210 m)	$3,870,000	A narrow path of scattered downed trees occurred near the start of the track before the damage became much more intense, with hundreds of trees snapped and uprooted, and one home had part of its roof ripped off. The tornado reached maximum intensity between MS 17 and US 51. Hundreds more trees were snapped and uprooted, some of which were hardwoods that were completely snapped off except for some large limbs and partially debarked. Several mobile homes were destroyed, and two homes built with wood frames and concrete blocks had almost all outer walls collapsed and roofs completely removed. A pickup truck was thrown nearly 150 yards (140 m), and further along the track, three high tension steel power poles were snapped off near their bases. The tornado then crossed into Attala County and snapped or uprooted many more trees before it weakened and dissipated. This was the first of three EF3 tornadoes spawned by the same supercell. Three people were injured.
EF3	WNW of Ethel to SSE of Ackerman	Attala, Choctaw	MS	33.132°N 89.5233°W	1828–1858	23.59 mi (37.96 km)	880 yd (800 m)	$6,200,000	The tornado touched down west of Ethel and produced a path of tree damage that intensified shortly after beginning. The tornado reached its widest point as it crossed the Natchez Trace Parkway, snapping and uprooting several dozen trees. Significant structural damage occurred to some buildings just southwest of McCool, and one cinder block building was almost completely destroyed. A room added to the back of a frame home was removed as well. After passing McCool, the tornado narrowed and weakened, while continuing to produce tree damage. The tornado again intensified after crossing into Choctaw County, and a dairy complex was heavily damaged south of Weir. A well-constructed milking parlor was completely destroyed, with all exterior walls collapsed or destroyed. A large 9,000 lb (4,100 kg) trailer was picked up and flipped on top of a farm building, and a few metal and wood livestock buildings and grain silo were destroyed. In addition, 300 head of cattle were injured, and ten were killed. A path of tree damage continued for a few miles before the tornado dissipated. This was the second of three EF3 tornadoes produced by the same supercell. Three people were injured.
EF0	N of Fannin to S of Goshen Springs	Rankin	MS	32.4356°N 89.9554°W	1839–1841	1.81 mi (2.91 km)	40 yd (37 m)	$10,000	A brief, weak tornado touched down north of Fannin and snapped several large pine trees.
EF0	W of Dixons Mills	Marengo	AL	32.0542°N 87.8184°W	1908–1909	0.46 mi (0.74 km)	200 yd (180 m)	$100,000	Four homes sustained minor damage and several trees were snapped.
EF1	W of New Roads	Pointe Coupee	LA	30.68°N 91.4637°W	1910–1912	0.25 mi (0.40 km)	30 yd (27 m)	$1,500,000	A brief tornado touched down and damaged several industrial buildings of a farm equipment dealer. Several large doors were blown in, a few windows were broken, and most of a roof was torn off. Debris was scattered about 0.25 miles (0.40 km) into an open field and trees and a railroad crossing arm was broken off as well.
EF0	SW of Pearl River	Neshoba	MS	32.7655°N 89.25°W	1942–1946	1.47 mi (2.37 km)	75 yd (69 m)	$130,000	Two homes had minor damage: one had its porch damaged and another had shingles torn off. Two outbuildings had their roofs blown off and several trees were snapped or uprooted along the path.
EF1	SE of Midway	Tishomingo	MS	34.7168°N 88.2335°W	1954–1958	2.78 mi (4.47 km)	100 yd (91 m)	$25,000	Two homes had minor damage and two metal side panels were blown off of two large sheds. Tree damage also occurred, with about three dozen trees uprooted, some trees snapped and twisted, and additional smaller trees snapped.
EF1	N of Bon Ayr to SE of Park City	Barren	KY	37.0599°N 86.069°W	2002–2006	3.07 mi (4.94 km)	350 yd (320 m)	$600,000	Nine barns were destroyed, one home had minor roof damage, and another home had its front porch torn off. Many trees were snapped or uprooted as well, and a path of straight line wind damage continued for about 1.5 miles (2.4 km) after the tornado lifted.
EF3	E of Kolola Springs, MS to W of Vernon, AL	Lowndes (MS), Lamar (AL)	MS, AL	33.6558°N 88.3733°W	2009–2025	13.35 mi (21.48 km)	2,500 yd (2,300 m)	$7,105,000	A home, a shed, power poles and trees were damaged near the start of the path, and another shed was damaged and the combine harvester inside was thrown into some trees. After the tornado passed through a wooded area, eight well-built homes in a neighborhood were damaged, and about five sustained severe damage. The tornado then moved into the Caledonia school complex and reached maximum intensity. The press box and concession stand of a football stadium were destroyed, several metal power poles were bent, and several trees were knocked down. Cars were moved up to 100 yards (91 m), and some cars were flipped or had windows broken. Five school buses were destroyed, two of which were flipped over, and one was lifted up and ripped apart. The gymnasium and another building were nearly destroyed, with several vehicles landing inside them. Six homes sustained significant damage, mainly to roofs, as the tornado moved across the south side of Caledonia. A church was completely destroyed when the roof was lifted up and collapsed on the building, and another church had minor roof damage. Further along the track, tree damage occurred in a wooded area, and many more homes were severely damaged. Many hardwood trees were snapped, a few of which fell on cars and homes, and a horse stable was completely destroyed. Several mobile homes were also destroyed, a high tension metal truss tower was snapped, and cars were moved up to 50 yards (46 m) in this area. The tornado weakened and continued to produce tree damage as it passed into Alabama. In Alabama, two homes were unroofed, two wooden barns were destroyed, and the foundations of two mobile homes were moved before the tornado lifted northeast of the town of Molloy. This was the third of three EF3 tornadoes produced by the same supercell. 15 people were injured.
EF1	NW of Hazel Dell to WNW of Hockinson	Clark	WA	45.6787°N 122.6924°W	2015–2040	10.11 mi (16.27 km)	440 yd (400 m)	$525,000	A tornado touched down multiple times between Hazel Dell and Hockinson. Along the path, 30 to 40 homes were damaged, mostly with roof damage, three lightly constructed structures were destroyed, and a semi trailer was tipped over. Several dozen boats were damaged, 19 power poles were snapped and over 200 trees were downed as well.
EF2	SE of Ashland	Wayne	TN	35.3243°N 87.587°W	2055–2056	1.29 mi (2.08 km)	400 yd (370 m)	$200,000	A 30 by 30-foot metal barn was completely destroyed, with sheets of metal from the barn carried about half a mile away into Lawrence County, and other metal barns had most of their roofs blown off. Some homes lost shingles, and a dog house that was anchored onto a concrete platform was blown away. In addition, several trees were snapped at the trunk, a wooden plank was planted into the ground, and many trees were uprooted near the Natchez Trace Parkway.
EF1	NE of Macon	Noxubee	MS	33.1544°N 88.4811°W	2058–2101	1.87 mi (3.01 km)	75 yd (69 m)	$30,000	A brief tornado downed five power poles, two of which were snapped.
EF0	SSW of Bigbee Valley	Noxubee	MS	33.1804°N 88.3984°W	2102–2104	0.76 mi (1.22 km)	40 yd (37 m)	$0	A brief, weak tornado touched down shortly after the previous event. A few trees had tops blown off and many tree limbs were snapped and downed along the path.
EF0	Southern Pickensville	Pickens	AL	33.2224°N 88.268°W	2110	0.04 mi (0.064 km)	50 yd (46 m)	$10,000	A brief tornado touched down on the southern side of Pickensville, damaging a metal storage barn and blowing down several trees.
EF1	ESE of Gordo to SW of Echola	Pickens, Tuscaloosa	AL	33.3133°N 87.8629°W	2143–2146	2.03 mi (3.27 km)	100 yd (91 m)	$55,000	A barn and several chicken houses sustained heavy damage, and minor tree damage occurred.
EF3	N of Tuscaloosa	Tuscaloosa	AL	33.482°N 87.5095°W	2211–2217	5.62 mi (9.04 km)	350 yd (320 m)	$435,000	At least five structures, including a church and a general store, were heavily damaged. At least 300 trees were snapped or uprooted.

=== January 11 event ===
List of confirmed tornadoes – Friday, January 11, 2008
EF#	Location	County / Parish	State	Start Coord.	Time (UTC)	Path length	Max width	Damage	Summary
EF1	Blue Springs	Barbour	AL	31.6402°N 85.5289°W	0804–0810	3.48 mi (5.60 km)	150 yd (140 m)	$75,000	Four houses and a mobile home sustained roof damage, including one that had its covered deck ripped off. Several large trees were snapped, twisted, or uprooted.

=== January 24 event ===
List of confirmed tornadoes – Thursday, January 24, 2008
EF#	Location	County / Parish	State	Start Coord.	Time (UTC)	Path length	Max width	Damage	Summary
EF0	Naval Air Station Point Mugu	Ventura	CA	34.12°N 119.12°W	0315–0325	0.1 mi (0.16 km)	5 yd (4.6 m)	$0	A building on base had its roof ripped off. Several trash cans were knocked over.

=== January 27 event ===
List of confirmed tornadoes – Sunday, January 27, 2008
EF#	Location	County / Parish	State	Start Coord.	Time (UTC)	Path length	Max width	Damage	Summary
EF0	Western Visalia	Tulare	CA	36.3301°N 119.3617°W	2010–2017	2.03 mi (3.27 km)	50 yd (46 m)	$750,000	Near a mobile home park, numerous large trees were uprooted; several were downed onto homes and garages, causing moderate damage. Shingles and carports were damaged, while fences and utility poles were downed.

=== January 29 event ===
List of confirmed tornadoes – Tuesday, January 29, 2008
EF#	Location	County / Parish	State	Start Coord.	Time (UTC)	Path length	Max width	Damage	Summary
EF1	W of Jonesboro	Cape Girardeau (MO), Union (IL)	MO, IL	37.46°N 89.51°W	2209–2213	4.26 mi (6.86 km)	200 yd (180 m)	$85,000	A hay barn was destroyed and a storage building sustained major damage; a house was damaged by debris from the hay barn. Another house sustained extensive shingle damage, utility poles were snapped, and a 5,000 US gal (19,000 L) steel fuel tank was moved. A large grain bin was blown onto a road, numerous trees were snapped or uprooted, and shingles were blown off a farm house.
EF2	SW of Fort Branch	Posey, Gibson	IN	38.1939°N 87.8725°W	2307–2311	7.01 mi (11.28 km)	100 yd (91 m)	$250,000	2 deaths – A mobile home was destroyed, killing the two occupants inside. A barn and some sheds were also destroyed, while four barns, three houses, and a church sustained damage primarily to their roofs. Trees were downed.
EF1	Northwestern Indianapolis	Marion	IN	39.8074°N 86.2822°W	0020–0021	0.1 mi (0.16 km)	50 yd (46 m)	$100,000	Apartment buildings and vehicles were damaged.
EF1	SE of Salem	Washington	IN	38.5299°N 86.1105°W	0040–0050	10.71 mi (17.24 km)	200 yd (180 m)	$110,000	Numerous trees were snapped or uprooted, a farm outbuilding was collapsed, and metal sheeting from a well-constructed barn was tossed 200 yd (180 m). A large storage shed was shifted and a well-constructed home lost a significant portion of its roof.
EF1	NNE of Henryville	Clark	IN	38.5515°N 85.7572°W	0058–0059	0.18 mi (0.29 km)	100 yd (91 m)	$50,000	1 death – Trees were downed, one of which crashed onto a mobile home and killed the occupant.
EF1	Southwestern Louisville to Berrytown	Jefferson	KY	38.2183°N 85.7945°W	0100–0113	16.38 mi (26.36 km)	100 yd (91 m)	$3,000,000	A tornado touched down four separate times, heavily damaging a church, damaging numerous homes, and uprooting several trees. Several windows were broken and several vehicles were damaged on the University of Louisville campus. Many businesses and private properties sustained extensive damage. Roofs were damaged and a large outbuilding at a training school was destroyed.
EF1	E of Lexington	Scott	IN	38.6503°N 85.614°W	0110–0112	1.81 mi (2.91 km)	100 yd (91 m)	$70,000	Trees were snapped and uprooted, a mobile home was destroyed, and a number of homes sustained roof damage.
EF0	Southern Lewisburg	Preble	OH	39.8397°N 84.5592°W	0200–0204	2 mi (3.2 km)	80 yd (73 m)	$25,000	A barn was damaged, a house lost a portion of its roof, and extensive tree damage occurred.

== February ==
Confirmed tornadoes by Enhanced Fujita rating
EFU	EF0	EF1	EF2	EF3	EF4	EF5	Total
0	58	55	22	7	5	0	147

=== February 5 event ===
List of confirmed tornadoes – Tuesday, February 5, 2008
EF#	Location	County / Parish	State	Start Coord.	Time (UTC)	Path length	Max width	Damage	Summary
EF1	Southern Hamburg	Ashley	AR	33.2062°N 91.799°W	2126–2127	0.62 mi (1.00 km)	50 yd (46 m)	$40,000	A high school had a portion of its roof peeled back. Several trees were snapped or uprooted.
EF0	S of Dermott	Chicot	AR	33.4781°N 91.4471°W	2204–2205	1.1 mi (1.8 km)	50 yd (46 m)	$0	A couple of trees were downed.
EF0	SW of Helena	Phillips	AR	34.46°N 90.71°W	2227–2228	0.16 mi (0.26 km)	25 yd (23 m)	$0	A brief tornado caused no damage.
EF0	E of Rosedale	Bolivar	MS	33.8319°N 90.972°W	2245–2248	3.43 mi (5.52 km)	50 yd (46 m)	$70,000	A few trees were uprooted, the roof was ripped off a mobile home, and a large gas storage tank was rolled.
EF4	NE of New Neely to Atkins to Mountain View to NE of Highland	Yell, Pope, Conway, Van Buren, Stone, Izard, Sharp	AR	35.0975°N 93.0733°W	2249–0056	121.84 mi (196.08 km)	1,320 yd (1,210 m)	$119,310,000	13 deaths – See article on this tornado – 140 people were injured.
EF1	NNE of Arp	Smith	TX	32.2434°N 95.0635°W	2250–2252	1 mi (1.6 km)	300 yd (270 m)	$30,000	A barn was destroyed, many trees were snapped or uprooted, and downed power lines sparked a grass fire.
EF2	NW of Arlington	Shelby, Tipton	TN	35.3097°N 89.7592°W	2300–2311	8.09 mi (13.02 km)	150 yd (140 m)	$1,005,000	This tornado moved through multiple semi-rural subdivisions outside of Arlington, causing considerable damage to homes. Houses had roofs ripped off, brick veneer dislodged, windows blown out, and one home had its entire second floor destroyed. Large trees were snapped and uprooted along the path, and two power line support towers were knocked down while another was twisted. One person was injured.
EF2	SE of Yellville to W of Mountain Home	Marion, Baxter	AR	36.2073°N 92.6219°W	2302–2316	12.5 mi (20.1 km)	880 yd (800 m)	$17,500,000	1 death – This tornado moved directly through the town of Gassville, where significant damage to homes occurred and a mobile home park was severely impacted, killing an elderly woman at that location. Several business in Gassville were heavily damaged, including a gas station. Numerous trees were snapped, some of which had large amounts of debris and sheet metal wrapped around them, and a gas leak was reported in town. 21 frame homes were destroyed, 26 sustained major damage, and 40 sustained minor damage. 12 mobile homes were destroyed, 15 sustained major damage, and 12 sustained minor damage. Many power lines and power poles were downed as well, and 36 people were injured.
EF0	SE of Covington	Tipton	TN	35.4705°N 89.5857°W	2318–2319	0.17 mi (0.27 km)	50 yd (46 m)	$7,000	Power poles and power lines were downed.
EF0	E of Norfolk	DeSoto	MS	34.945°N 90.22°W	2318–2321	2.64 mi (4.25 km)	100 yd (91 m)	$50,000	A farm building roof and pivot irrigation system were damaged, and power poles were downed.
EF1	W of Charleston	Tipton	TN	35.4951°N 89.5462°W	2323–2324	0.73 mi (1.17 km)	50 yd (46 m)	$75,000	One trailer home was destroyed and another was damaged. A house was severely damaged and a trailer to an 18-wheeler was flipped.
EF0	W of Casa	Yell	AR	35.0333°N 93.1138°W	2331–2332	0.6 mi (0.97 km)	30 yd (27 m)	Unknown	Trees were downed on a private property.
EF1	E of Covington	Tipton	TN	35.5774°N 89.5241°W	2332–2333	0.29 mi (0.47 km)	50 yd (46 m)	$50,000	A trailer home was destroyed and an adjacent home was damaged.
EF2	Southaven, MS to Memphis, TN	DeSoto (MS), Shelby (TN)	MS, TN	34.9754°N 90.0086°W	2332–2345	10.24 mi (16.48 km)	440 yd (400 m)	$128,400,000	3 deaths – See section on this tornado – A total of 13 people were injured.
EF0	ESE of Sardis	Panola	MS	34.4069°N 89.7384°W	2353–2354	0.2 mi (0.32 km)	25 yd (23 m)	$12,000	A tractor was flipped, a shed was destroyed, and trees sustained minor damage.
EF1	NE of Palmersville	Weakley, Henry	TN	36.4232°N 88.5298°W	2355–0002	5.09 mi (8.19 km)	150 yd (140 m)	$160,000	Three barns and a shop building were destroyed. Several houses and mobile homes sustained varying degrees of damage. Numerous trees were snapped or uprooted.
EF1	NW of Oxford	Lafayette	MS	34.4307°N 89.6522°W	2357–0004	6.89 mi (11.09 km)	25 yd (23 m)	$25,000	Many structures were damaged and numerous trees were snapped or uprooted.
EF3	N of Oxford	Lafayette	MS	34.4071°N 89.5288°W	2357–0007	7.15 mi (11.51 km)	1,000 yd (910 m)	$35,000,000	This strong wedge tornado destroyed a Caterpillar plant, a county owned warehouse, an Ability Works Incorporated plant, a church, and a veterinary clinic along its path. A lumber company was severely damaged as well. 11 homes were destroyed and 15 others suffered heavy damage. 10 mobile homes were destroyed or heavily damaged as well. Nine commercial structures were destroyed with another 6 sustaining heavy damage. 2,500 acres (110,000,000 sq ft) of trees were snapped or uprooted in the Holly Springs National Forest, and about 70 structures were damaged or destroyed in total. Fourteen people were injured.
EF0	Eads	Shelby, Fayette	TN	35.204°N 89.667°W	0002–0009	4.9 mi (7.9 km)	50 yd (46 m)	$50,000	Tornado touchdown in a suburban area caused roof and gutter damage to homes and damaged a gazebo. Eads Elementary School lost a significant amount of roof shingles, and some trees were snapped and uprooted.
EF0	SSW of Salem (1st tornado)	Marion	IL	38.5067°N 88.9962°W	0012–0013	0.11 mi (0.18 km)	40 yd (37 m)	Unknown	A machine shed sustained severe damage, with several of its walls collapsed, the attached awning upturned, and the roof lifted and tossed.
EF0	SSW of Salem (2nd tornado)	Marion	IL	38.5115°N 88.9977°W	0012–0013	0.22 mi (0.35 km)	30 yd (27 m)	Unknown	Moderate damage was inflicted to a machine shed, and an adjacent home had two uprooted trees laid across its roof.
EF3	SSW of Stanton to W of Jackson	Fayette, Haywood, Madison	TN	35.3697°N 89.3712°W	0021–0054	31.13 mi (50.10 km)	600 yd (550 m)	$10,300,000	3 deaths – See section on this tornado – 14 people were injured.
EF1	NE of Murray	Calloway	KY	36.6384°N 88.1571°W	0025–0028	1.43 mi (2.30 km)	150 yd (140 m)	$35,000	One home sustained damage to its shingles while another had its interior ceilings blown out, its interior significantly damaged, and its windows shattered.
EF0	WNW of Ripley	Tippah	MS	34.7604°N 89.0528°W	0036–0037	1.35 mi (2.17 km)	50 yd (46 m)	$50,000	Two homes and two vehicles were damaged. Numerous trees were downed.
EF1	S of Canton	Trigg	KY	36.76°N 87.96°W	0045–0046	0.08 mi (0.13 km)	40 yd (37 m)	$8,000	Trees were snapped and uprooted.
EF0	SE of Walnut	Tippah	MS	34.8873°N 88.8739°W	0050–0053	2.48 mi (3.99 km)	50 yd (46 m)	$100,000	A few barns and storage buildings were destroyed, a few homes sustained minor damage, and many trees were downed; a fallen tree knocked down half of a brick chimney.
EF1	S of Cadiz	Trigg	KY	36.8062°N 87.88°W	0050–0100	5.56 mi (8.95 km)	150 yd (140 m)	$60,000	The roof was partially blown off one home while others sustained lesser damage. A barn was shifted slightly off its foundation, and trees were snapped or uprooted.
EF1	ESE of Walnut	Alcorn	MS	34.9192°N 88.7856°W	0056–0059	2.56 mi (4.12 km)	100 yd (91 m)	$250,000	Six mobile homes were impacted, of which two were completely destroyed and two others sustained severe damage. Several vehicles and an RV were tossed. Three houses, a church, and a cemetery sustained damage, and numerous trees were downed. Four people were injured.
EF4	Northern Jackson	Madison	TN	35.6772°N 88.8646°W	0059–0107	7.61 mi (12.25 km)	125 yd (114 m)	$100,000,000	See article on this tornado – 51 people were injured.
EF1	E of Vilonia	Faulkner, White	AR	35.0712°N 92.1407°W	0105–0112	5.46 mi (8.79 km)	100 yd (91 m)	$140,000	A barn and a mobile home were destroyed, part of an old chicken house was collapsed, and trees and power lines were downed.
EF2	NNW of Hopkinsville	Christian	KY	36.9614°N 87.6479°W	0109–0125	14.06 mi (22.63 km)	275 yd (251 m)	$4,400,000	Seventeen houses (including at least five mobile homes) were destroyed and 27 were damaged. Nineteen garages, sheds, and barns were damaged or destroyed. Two people were injured.
EF2	Spring Creek	Madison	TN	35.7655°N 88.6877°W	0113–0114	0.38 mi (0.61 km)	150 yd (140 m)	$200,000	One home had its entire roof ripped off and front exterior wall partially collapsed; three other homes sustained extensive roof damage. Large trees were snapped or uprooted.
EF1	Eastview	McNairy	TN	35.07°N 88.6123°W	0113–0122	8.95 mi (14.40 km)	150 yd (140 m)	$250,000	One business was destroyed and another was damaged. A mobile home was destroyed and two houses sustained roof damage. Numerous trees were downed.
EF0	W of Colt	St. Francis	AR	35.1348°N 90.8502°W	0119–0120	0.1 mi (0.16 km)	25 yd (23 m)	$1,000	A brief tornado was reported.
EF1	NW of Pocahontas, AR to W of Naylor, MO	Randolph (AR), Ripley (MO)	AR, MO	36.4235°N 91.1749°W	0120–0148	31.92 mi (51.37 km)	200 yd (180 m)	$280,000	Several homes were impacted, including one that was destroyed. Four to five mobile homes were damaged or destroyed, a manufactured home and a cabin were moved off their foundations, a large metal building sustained severe damage, and a garage was impacted. An old barn was knocked over, and numerous trees were snapped or uprooted.
EF0	NW of Junction City	Union	AR	33.02°N 92.7645°W	0130–0136	7 mi (11 km)	100 yd (91 m)	$200,000	Several porches and awnings were destroyed, many trees were snapped, and several structures sustained roof damage (including a church that sustained severe damage to its roof).
EF4	NW of Savannah to SW of Clifton	Hardin	TN	35.2676°N 88.2926°W	0140–0157	16.17 mi (26.02 km)	880 yd (800 m)	$17,600,000	3 deaths – This large wedge tornado destroyed 59 houses, 11 mobile homes, 11 public buildings, a vacant store, and 11 farm buildings. This included a few frame homes that were leveled or swept from their foundations. Another 117 structures received varying degrees of damage. Violent damage was observed at Sharon Baptist Church, where five buildings were destroyed. This included a 550-seat sanctuary housed in a large, well-built metal frame building that was completely flattened. Large, well-anchored steel beams were completely ripped out of the structure's slab foundation, which had some sections pushed clean of debris and metal framing. A nearby church school building was partially leveled as well, and metal light poles in the parking lot were twisted off at the base and blown away. Vehicles were tossed and destroyed, and a boat was hurled through the exterior wall of a brick mansion that was badly damaged in the tornado. Hundreds of trees along the Tennessee River were snapped and shredded, and five people were injured. All three fatalities occurred in mobile homes.
EF3	SW Greenville to N of Martwick	Muhlenberg	KY	37.1591°N 87.2314°W	0144–0201	18.05 mi (29.05 km)	375 yd (343 m)	$21,300,000	3 deaths – This strong tornado struck the neighboring towns of Greenville and Powderly, destroying 48 homes and mobile homes and severely damaging 32 others in the area. A half dozen businesses and churches were damaged, including a hotel and a car dealership. A high school sustained damage to its gymnasium roof. One building in an industrial park was flattened, with another building being severely damaged. Numerous trees were downed, some of which landed on roads and vehicles in the Central City area. All three fatalities took place in a mobile home park. In total, 69 homes were destroyed and 203 were damaged along the path. Twenty-four people were injured.
EF0	E of Clarendon	Monroe	AR	34.68°N 91.2314°W	0148–0156	7.96 mi (12.81 km)	75 yd (69 m)	$15,000	Several dozen trees were snapped or downed, power lines were downed, and a few roofs lost shingles.
EF0	SW of Moro	Lee	AR	34.7451°N 91.0893°W	0159–0200	0.09 mi (0.14 km)	25 yd (23 m)	$1,000	A tree was snapped.
EF1	S of Harviell	Butler	MO	36.6332°N 90.5159°W	0203–0209	3.38 mi (5.44 km)	300 yd (270 m)	$100,000	Large trees and tree limbs were snapped off, some of which fell onto cars and homes. An old barn was blown over, and a newer barn lost part of its roof and a large door. Several grain bins were dented by wind-blown debris, and an equipment shed was blown away. Several homes had shingle damage, and power poles were snapped.
EF1	SE of Big Sandy	Benton	TN	36.2022°N 88.0768°W	0205–0210	2.02 mi (3.25 km)	50 yd (46 m)	$0	Trees were damaged.
EF2	WSW of Tennessee Ridge	Benton, Houston	TN	36.2542°N 88.0073°W	0207–0230	6.56 mi (10.56 km)	440 yd (400 m)	$10,250,000	Sixteen houses or mobile homes were destroyed and 31 houses or mobile homes sustained major damage. Trees were uprooted and snapped, and 20 power poles were downed.
EF1	Western Clifton	Wayne, Perry	TN	35.3792°N 88.0208°W	0210–0222	10.11 mi (16.27 km)	50 yd (46 m)	Unknown	Several houses were damaged at the west edge of Clifton and trees were downed along the path.
EF1	W of Hohenwald to E of Centerville	Perry, Lewis, Hickman	TN	35.5667°N 87.6833°W	0210–0235	22.85 mi (36.77 km)	200 yd (180 m)	$900,000	Four houses and two mobile homes were destroyed. Six houses sustained major damage. Barns and outbuildings were flattened, and trees were snapped and uprooted.
EF1	Western Bloomfield	Greene	IN	39.0204°N 86.9488°W	0215–0219	2 mi (3.2 km)	50 yd (46 m)	$1,250,000	Several dozen homes, garages, and outbuildings, as well as an elementary school, sustained significant roof and wall damage. Numerous trees were snapped or uprooted and power lines were downed.
EF2	E of Broseley to N of Bernie	Butler, Stoddard	MO	36.6859°N 90.22°W	0218–0238	13.9 mi (22.4 km)	200 yd (180 m)	$300,000	Near Broseley, this high-end EF2 tornado ripped large sections of roof from several homes, and obliterated an abandoned mobile home leaving the frame bent. Metal silos were thrown up to 900 yards away from where they originated. One of these silos was smashed into a house, which lost its roof and most of its exterior walls. Near Bernie, a metal barn was destroyed with debris scattered hundreds of yards away, a concrete silo was destroyed, and a wagon was thrown 150 yards. Extensive damage to trees and power poles occurred along the path.
EF2	SW of Primm Springs to W of Brentwood	Hickman, Williamson	TN	35.8042°N 87.2875°W	0240–0315	25.32 mi (40.75 km)	300 yd (270 m)	$750,000	Severe damage occurred in the rural community of Brushy with 8 houses destroyed and 39 others heavily damaged. Additional homes were damaged near Leiper's Fork, one of which collapsed. One person was injured. The tornado dissipated just before reaching the Nashville suburbs.
EF3	SW of Castalian Springs, TN to Lafayette, TN to NE of Tompkinsville, KY	Sumner (TN), Trousdale (TN), Macon (TN), Monroe (KY), Cumberland (KY)	TN, KY	36.3822°N 86.3358°W	0402–0451	50.32 mi (80.98 km)	880 yd (800 m)	$28,802,000	22 deaths – See section on this tornado – A total of 63 people were injured.
EF0	WSW of Jonesville	Catahoula	LA	31.5629°N 91.9836°W	0517–0518	1.47 mi (2.37 km)	50 yd (46 m)	$2,000	Tin was ripped off a barn and numerous limbs were downed.
EF2	W of Cecilia to Elizabethtown	Hardin	KY	37.6625°N 86.0125°W	0521–0525	7.1 mi (11.4 km)	400 yd (370 m)	$3,000,000	This tornado was embedded within a squall line. It destroyed a mobile home and an outbuilding at the beginning of the path before striking Cecilia and Elizabethtown. Central Hardin High School in Elizabethtown sustained major roof damage. Concrete pillar stadium lights at the school football stadium were snapped, and the press box was thrown onto the field and destroyed. Homes along the path sustained severe roof damage, and one home lost its roof entirely. An industrial building had roof damage and its garage doors blown in. Several boats were flipped over, and a large bus was pushed two feet as well.
EF2	E of Elizabethtown	Hardin	KY	37.6965°N 85.7759°W	0527–0529	1.02 mi (1.64 km)	300 yd (270 m)	$150,000	One mobile home was destroyed while another was knocked off its foundation and a third was turned onto its roof.
EF1	N of Bonnieville	Hart	KY	37.4031°N 85.9556°W	0532–0543	10.53 mi (16.95 km)	150 yd (140 m)	$500,000	Several barns and mobile homes were damaged or destroyed. A house was damaged.
EF0	NNW of Fairfield	Spencer	KY	37.9917°N 85.4187°W	0538–0540	0.66 mi (1.06 km)	220 yd (200 m)	$150,000	Two mobile homes were destroyed. Roofs and trees were damaged.
EF2	N of New Haven	Nelson	KY	37.7265°N 85.6326°W	0538–0542	1.29 mi (2.08 km)	300 yd (270 m)	$150,000	An outbuilding was destroyed, the top half of a silo was knocked off, and trees were downed.
EF0	WNW of Lobelville	Perry	TN	35.81°N 87.822°W	0541	0.1 mi (0.16 km)	20 yd (18 m)	$0	Trees were damaged.
EF0	S of Taylorsville	Spencer	KY	38.0179°N 85.34°W	0543–0545	0.56 mi (0.90 km)	220 yd (200 m)	$300,000	Two barns were destroyed while several other barns and homes were damaged. One person was injured.
EF2	NNE of Shelbyville	Shelby	KY	38.268°N 85.2028°W	0546–0552	6.99 mi (11.25 km)	250 yd (230 m)	$175,000	A large, well-built barn was destroyed and tossed 50 yd (46 m). An 18,000 lb (8,200 kg) trailer was moved and flipped. Another barn was destroyed, shingles were removed from a well-constructed roof top, several homes sustained some sort of roof damage, and trees were damaged.
EF2	E of Bardstown	Nelson	KY	37.8113°N 85.3812°W	0550–0552	0.76 mi (1.22 km)	300 yd (270 m)	$250,000	Two shop buildings were heavily damaged or destroyed. A couple trailers were rolled over, and a mobile home was knocked off its foundation and rolled onto two cars. Two people were injured.
EF0	E of Only	Hickman	TN	35.8708°N 87.6639°W	0551	0.1 mi (0.16 km)	20 yd (18 m)	$0	Trees were damaged.
EF0	SE of Waddy	Shelby	KY	38.1218°N 85.0512°W	0552–0554	0.35 mi (0.56 km)	125 yd (114 m)	$60,000	A barn was destroyed, with its sheet metal thrown long distances in several directions.
EF1	Brandenburg	Meade	KY	37.9615°N 86.2713°W	0554–0605	6.45 mi (10.38 km)	350 yd (320 m)	$2,000,000	This tornado caused considerable damage in Brandenburg, which was devastated by a violent F5 tornado during the 1974 Super Outbreak. Several businesses were damaged, a cinder block storage building collapsed, and another storage building lifted up and thrown. One building sustained collapse of an exterior wall, the Old Brandenburg Telephone Company had roof damage, a church was damaged, and extensive tree and power line damage occurred as well.

=== February 6 event ===
List of confirmed tornadoes – Wednesday, February 6, 2008
EF#	Location	County / Parish	State	Start Coord.	Time (UTC)	Path length	Max width	Damage	Summary
EF1	E of Springfield	Washington	KY	37.6663°N 85.1817°W	0601–0603	0.3 mi (0.48 km)	150 yd (140 m)	$60,000	The roof was blown off a house and tossed 125 yd (114 m). Several trees were snapped, and small outbuildings were destroyed.
EF2	S of Mackville	Washington	KY	37.6889°N 85.0649°W	0606–0608	0.99 mi (1.59 km)	250 yd (230 m)	$15,000	A large, well-constructed outbuilding was blown away. Six-by-six inch posts were snapped, metal sheeting was thrown long distances, and 200 lb (91 kg) concrete joists were displaced.
EF1	NE of Frankfort	Franklin	KY	38.2428°N 84.8121°W	0608–0612	2.44 mi (3.93 km)	170 yd (160 m)	$500,000	Numerous hardwood trees were downed. Two homes sustained extensive roof damage, and five barns were destroyed.
EF1	Eastern Harrodsburg	Mercer	KY	37.7603°N 84.8393°W	0620–0622	0.88 mi (1.42 km)	350 yd (320 m)	$1,000,000	A warehouse had three of its walls collapsed, a garage was destroyed, the roof of a factory was blown in, and an elementary school sustained extensive roof and ceiling damage. Trees were snapped or uprooted; fallen trees and flying limbs damaged homes and vehicles. A chimney and power lines were downed.
EF2	SW of Cynthiana	Harrison	KY	38.3633°N 84.3778°W	0629–0634	3.49 mi (5.62 km)	440 yd (400 m)	$700,000	Several homes sustained damage, including a few that had their entire roofs ripped off. Several barns and outbuildings were damaged or destroyed, and numerous hardwood trees were snapped.
EF0	S of Burns	Dickson	TN	36.0125°N 87.3167°W	0632	0.1 mi (0.16 km)	20 yd (18 m)	$0	Minor tree damage occurred.
EF0	WNW of Nashville	Davidson	TN	36.2083°N 86.9514°W	0644	0.1 mi (0.16 km)	20 yd (18 m)	$0	Trees were downed.
EF0	SE of Benton	Yazoo	MS	32.7093°N 90.2314°W	0646–0652	4.77 mi (7.68 km)	75 yd (69 m)	$180,000	Two grain bins were destroyed, a tractor trailer was blown on its side, metal roofing was peeled off a home, and power poles were downed.
EF0	NNE of Winchester	Clark	KY	38.0732°N 84.1446°W	0651–0652	0.92 mi (1.48 km)	125 yd (114 m)	$200,000	Two barns were destroyed and three more were severely damaged. A house was damaged, a corn crib was destroyed, and many trees were snapped or uprooted.
EF1	S of Owingsville	Bath	KY	38.0989°N 83.8332°W	0706–0715	8.73 mi (14.05 km)	250 yd (230 m)	$250,000	Two mobile homes, several barns, and outbuildings were almost completely destroyed.
EF0	E of Millersville	Sumner	TN	36.3528°N 86.6736°W	0712–0718	3.26 mi (5.25 km)	50 yd (46 m)	$0	Minor tree damage occurred.
EF1	NNW of Gallatin	Sumner	TN	36.4042°N 86.5417°W	0722–0745	11.76 mi (18.93 km)	100 yd (91 m)	$0	Some tree damage was observed.
EF0	NNE of Denniston	Menifee	KY	37.949°N 83.53°W	0723–0727	4.03 mi (6.49 km)	150 yd (140 m)	$50,000	Two older barns were destroyed, and several trees were snapped or uprooted.
EF1	N of Carthage	Leake	MS	32.8813°N 89.5544°W	0725–0727	1.5 mi (2.4 km)	50 yd (46 m)	$0	Several large pine trees were downed and other smaller trees were snapped.
EF3	Amos to SW of Fountain Run	Allen, Monroe	KY	36.6403°N 86.1132°W	0740–0753	9.44 mi (15.19 km)	440 yd (400 m)	$1,480,000	4 deaths – This high-end EF3 tornado caused major damage in the Amos community. 12 homes and mobile homes were completely destroyed in this area, including a few older frame homes that were swept from their foundations. Mobile home frames, pieces of farm machinery, and vehicles were thrown and mangled. Large swaths of trees were mowed down in wooded areas, destroying about 200,000 log feet of timber. Fences were flattened, and many farm animals were killed. Eleven people were injured.
EF0	W of Franklin	Williamson	TN	35.8875°N 87.0542°W	0745–0747	1.6 mi (2.6 km)	300 yd (270 m)	$0	Trees sustained minor damage.
EF0	SE of Macon	Noxubee	MS	33.02°N 88.49°W	0755–0757	1.67 mi (2.69 km)	50 yd (46 m)	$0	Trees were snapped and limbs were downed.
EF1	Beaverton	Lamar, Marion	AL	33.9265°N 88.0309°W	0804–0813	7.3 mi (11.7 km)	150 yd (140 m)	$70,000	In Beaverton, the town's post office had its metal roof blown off, and the city hall building sustained roof damage. Many trees were snapped in town, some of which landed on homes and caused major damage. Other trees landed on roads and railroad tracks. North of Guin, additional trees were downed, one of which landed on and destroyed a barn.
EF2	E of Newtonville to NW of Oakman	Fayette, Tuscaloosa, Walker	AL	33.5294°N 87.7729°W	0851–0919	26.19 mi (42.15 km)	2,000 yd (1,800 m)	$335,000	Near the beginning of the path, this very large wedge tornado caused major damage to mobile homes. A gas station in the New Lexington area was damaged. The most severe damage occurred near Oakman, where frame homes sustained major damage and mobile homes were destroyed. A total of eight structures were destroyed, and 15 others were damaged. Numerous trees were snapped and uprooted along the path, and four people were injured.
EF4	S of Moulton to SW of Decatur	Lawrence, Morgan	AL	34.397°N 87.289°W	0902–0924	16.7 mi (26.9 km)	880 yd (800 m)	Unknown	4 deaths – See section on this tornado – A total of 23 people were injured.
EF0	E of Dodge City	Cullman	AL	34.0445°N 86.867°W	1000–1001	0.33 mi (0.53 km)	20 yd (18 m)	$0	Trees were damaged and uprooted.
EF1	N of Guntersville	Marshall	AL	34.391°N 86.2761°W	1045–1046	0.16 mi (0.26 km)	35 yd (32 m)	Unknown	Eight trees were snapped or uprooted, an unanchored carport and two small storage sheds were destroyed, and a house sustained minor roof damage. Three windows were blown out, and a large telephone pole was destroyed.
EF4	S of Pisgah to S of Flat Rock	Jackson	AL	34.667°N 85.844°W	1117–1129	10.9 mi (17.5 km)	660 yd (600 m)	Unknown	1 death – This violent tornado produced its worst damage near Rosalie, where multiple frame homes were destroyed. Some of these homes were swept clean from their foundations. Numerous trees were snapped and denuded, chicken houses were destroyed, and 2,500-pound hay bales were thrown and shredded. Aerial surveys revealed some ground scouring in open fields as well. The fatality occurred when a woman was killed in the destruction of her frame home, and twelve others were injured.
EF2	NE of Clanton to S of Sylacauga	Coosa, Talladega	AL	32.9955°N 86.5022°W	1225–1245	15.9 mi (25.6 km)	2,000 yd (1,800 m)	$120,000	This massive wedge tornado was more than a mile wide at times. A wide swath of hardwood trees was mowed down, two mobile homes were blown off of their foundations and rolled over, and four large power poles were snapped. A carport was overturned as well.

=== February 12 event ===
List of confirmed tornadoes – Tuesday, February 12, 2008
EF#	Location	County / Parish	State	Start Coord.	Time (UTC)	Path length	Max width	Damage	Summary
EF0	NW of Gulfport	Harrison	MS	30.4414°N 89.1512°W	1737–1739	0.1 mi (0.16 km)	20 yd (18 m)	$0	The public reported a tornado.
EF0	SE of Lafitte	Plaquemines	LA	29.63°N 89.95°W	1840–1841	0.1 mi (0.16 km)	15 yd (14 m)	$0	An emergency manager reported a tornado over an open field.
EF1	S of Flowood	Rankin	MS	32.2719°N 90.142°W	1845–1848	3.23 mi (5.20 km)	400 yd (370 m)	$1,000,000	Numerous trees were snapped or uprooted. Numerous homes and business sustained roof damage, mainly to shingles. Constructional material was blown and several outbuildings were heavily damaged or destroyed.
EF0	S of St. Martinville	St. Martin	LA	30.08°N 91.83°W	1902–1905	0.26 mi (0.42 km)	10 yd (9.1 m)	$15,000	A landspout tornado downed two 75 ft (2,300 cm) ham radio towers; one fell on the roof of a residence. A fence with concrete posts in the ground was blown over.
EF1	E of Brandon	Rankin	MS	32.2948°N 89.8812°W	1907–1910	2.67 mi (4.30 km)	250 yd (230 m)	$200,000	Two barns were destroyed and a third was heavily damaged. Numerous trees were snapped or uprooted.
EF0	WNW of New Iberia	Iberia	LA	30.03°N 91.88°W	1916–1918	0.17 mi (0.27 km)	10 yd (9.1 m)	$20,000	An overhead door was blown out and a carport was damaged at the Teche Oil Company; four vehicles in the carport were damaged.
EF0	E of McComb	Pike	MS	31.25°N 90.3346°W	1921–1923	0.1 mi (0.16 km)	20 yd (18 m)	$0	Law enforcement reported a tornado.
EF0	N of Pine Grove	St. Helena	LA	30.7072°N 90.75°W	1923–1926	0.2 mi (0.32 km)	20 yd (18 m)	$0	The public reported a tornado with debris in the air.
EF0	NNW of Cocoa Beach	Brevard	FL	28.347°N 80.608°W	1945	0.1 mi (0.16 km)	30 yd (27 m)	$200,000	The roof was ripped off a beach side condominium; the debris damaged the adjacent condominium and four vehicles. Sixteen apartments were rendered uninhabitable.
EF0	NE of Raleigh	Smith	MS	32.0431°N 89.459°W	1945–1946	0.7 mi (1.1 km)	150 yd (140 m)	$25,000	Several trees were snapped or uprooted. Some shingles were removed from a church.
EF1	SSE of Independence	Tangipahoa	LA	30.6155°N 90.5°W	1945–1947	0.77 mi (1.24 km)	20 yd (18 m)	$25,000	1 death – A mobile home was overturned, a nearby building had a portion of its roof peeled off, and vehicles were moved and had their windows broken. A death occurred in the parking lot of a hospital when a woman was thrown into a vehicle.
EF1	N of Collins	Covington	MS	31.7196°N 89.6024°W	1953–1954	1.48 mi (2.38 km)	100 yd (91 m)	$200,000	Multiple large pine trees were snapped or uprooted, and the roofs were peeled off a few chicken houses.
EF1	E of Bay Springs	Jasper	MS	31.975°N 89.2371°W	2007–2009	0.9 mi (1.4 km)	100 yd (91 m)	$90,000	Several large pine trees were snapped or uprooted. One house sustained shingle damage.
EF0	Montz	St. Charles	LA	30°N 90.47°W	2020–2022	0.1 mi (0.16 km)	20 yd (18 m)	$0	A couple of patrol officers spotted a weak tornado.
EF0	Everglades City	Collier	FL	25.8481°N 81.39°W	0245–0248	1.32 mi (2.12 km)	50 yd (46 m)	$444,590	Two Cessna Aircraft were flipped, trees and power poles were downed, and fences were damaged. A condo, school, and storage building sustained roof and minor structural damage.
EF0	Western Fort Lauderdale	Broward	FL	26.0884°N 80.1894°W	0403–0410	3.15 mi (5.07 km)	220 yd (200 m)	$350,000	Fencing, awnings, power lines, and trees were downed. Roofs sustained minor damage.

=== February 13 event ===
List of confirmed tornadoes – Wednesday, February 13, 2008
EF#	Location	County / Parish	State	Start Coord.	Time (UTC)	Path length	Max width	Damage	Summary
EF0	Marathon	Monroe	FL	24.7028°N 81.0857°W	1832–1834	0.62 mi (1.00 km)	25 yd (23 m)	$2,000	Live palm fronds and tree branches were damaged. Three homes reported minor roof damage, an unsecured soccer goal was overturned, and a wooden canopy was blown down.

=== February 16 event ===
List of confirmed tornadoes – Saturday, February 16, 2008
EF#	Location	County / Parish	State	Start Coord.	Time (UTC)	Path length	Max width	Damage	Summary
EF1	Morganza	Pointe Coupee	LA	30.73°N 91.6337°W	1230–1233	2.47 mi (3.98 km)	40 yd (37 m)	$150,000	A mobile home sustained severe damage, with its roof ripped off. Several homes sustained minor to moderate roof damage, carports were damaged, and tree limbs were downed.
EF0	W of La Marque	Galveston	TX	29.37°N 94.99°W	0335	0.01 mi (0.016 km)	15 yd (14 m)	$0	The public reported a brief tornado.
EF1	S of Hemphill	Sabine	TX	31.2602°N 93.8314°W	0340–0343	0.33 mi (0.53 km)	100 yd (91 m)	$50,000	A large hay barn was destroyed, several trees and power lines were snapped, and a trailer home was damaged.

=== February 17 event ===
List of confirmed tornadoes – Sunday, February 17, 2008
EF#	Location	County / Parish	State	Start Coord.	Time (UTC)	Path length	Max width	Damage	Summary
EF1	SE of Blue Springs	Barbour	AL	31.6478°N 85.5238°W	0600–0602	2.26 mi (3.64 km)	50 yd (46 m)	$75,000	Four houses and a mobile home sustained roof damage, and several trees were snapped.
EF1	E of Palmetto	St. Landry	LA	30.6911°N 91.9°W	0730–0735	5.6 mi (9.0 km)	125 yd (114 m)	$125,000	Numerous trees were snapped or downed, trapping residents in a house. Many homes sustained roof damage, a tied-down mobile home and a camper were rolled and destroyed, and several power poles were downed. Sheds were destroyed.
EF1	SSW of Greensburg	St. Helena	LA	30.7531°N 90.7022°W	0942–0944	0.3 mi (0.48 km)	15 yd (14 m)	$30,000	Several trees and power lines were downed, a mobile home was overturned, a few mobile homes had their roofs ripped off, and the porch of a house was destroyed.
EF1	Roseland	Tangipahoa	LA	30.77°N 90.5017°W	0955–1000	2.04 mi (3.28 km)	15 yd (14 m)	$15,000	A home sustained damage to its roof, a camper trailer was damaged, and numerous large trees and power lines were downed.
EF0	NW of Mt. Hermon	Washington	LA	30.9705°N 90.3039°W	1025–1027	0.1 mi (0.16 km)	15 yd (14 m)	$8,000	A shed was destroyed, the roofs were ripped off a few farm outbuildings, and a few large trees and power lines were downed.
EF0	ENE of Franklinton	Washington	LA	30.88°N 89.9986°W	1105–1107	0.25 mi (0.40 km)	15 yd (14 m)	$20,000	Three houses and six barns and sheds sustained minor roof damage. Numerous trees and power lines were downed.
EF1	Molino	Escambia	FL	30.7026°N 87.3603°W	1759–1803	5.08 mi (8.18 km)	200 yd (180 m)	$750,000	Approximately 60 structures sustained minor to heavy damage, 40 of which were rendered uninhabitable.
EF1	NE of Molino	Santa Rosa	FL	30.785°N 87.243°W	1814–1816	2.07 mi (3.33 km)	75 yd (69 m)	$200,000	Two homes sustained extensive roof damage, and a large heavy-duty metal shed was destroyed.
EF2	NNW of Selma	Dallas	AL	32.4873°N 87.1105°W	1826–1838	7.58 mi (12.20 km)	400 yd (370 m)	$350,000	At least five structures were destroyed. An additional 12–15 structures were damaged to varying degrees. Hundreds of trees were snapped or uprooted.
EF2	SW of Andalusia	Escambia, Covington	AL	31.097°N 86.8023°W	1904–1925	14.42 mi (23.21 km)	500 yd (460 m)	$950,000	Several houses were damaged, including four that were destroyed. Two large towers were damaged, some century-old headstones were blown over in a cemetery, and significant tree damage occurred.
EF1	SE of Clayton	Chilton	AL	32.8046°N 86.5804°W	1905–1906	1.18 mi (1.90 km)	200 yd (180 m)	$150,000	Two oak trees fell on a mobile home and demolished it. Several fast food restaurant signs and a few road signs were damaged or destroyed, and a few hundred trees were snapped or uprooted.
EF1	NW of Alexander City	Coosa, Tallapoosa	AL	32.9988°N 86.0854°W	1942–1953	10.76 mi (17.32 km)	100 yd (91 m)	$105,000	Six homes sustained varying degrees of damage. Numerous softwood trees were snapped and limbs downed; three automobiles were heavily damaged as a result.
EF0	W of Hackneyville	Tallapoosa	AL	33.0346°N 85.9943°W	1947–1953	4.53 mi (7.29 km)	50 yd (46 m)	$10,000	A few homes sustained roof damage and a few trees were snapped.
EF0	SE of Ashland	Clay	AL	33.1452°N 85.7857°W	2003–2005	1.56 mi (2.51 km)	50 yd (46 m)	$10,000	A home sustained roof damage, a small catfish restaurant had a portion of its roof tore off, several trees were snapped, and a vehicle was tossed.
EF1	SSW of Troy	Coffee, Pike	AL	31.5777°N 86.0985°W	2017–2034	9.56 mi (15.39 km)	250 yd (230 m)	$85,000	The roof was completely ripped off two barns and partially removed from a single family home. A church and a house were damaged, a greenhouse had its windows blown out, and numerous trees were snapped or uprooted.
EF1	N of Roanoke	Randolph	AL	33.2628°N 85.5124°W	2022–2037	14.71 mi (23.67 km)	150 yd (140 m)	$100,000	Five homes, three barns, and two vehicles were damaged. A shop and numerous outbuildings were damaged or destroyed. Several dozen trees were snapped or uprooted.
EF2	SW of Montgomery	Lowndes	AL	32.1715°N 86.8239°W	2024–2037	11 mi (18 km)	225 yd (206 m)	$215,000	At least 11 structures—mainly mobile homes—were impacted, including three that were completely destroyed. Hundreds of trees were snapped or uprooted. Ten people were injured.
EF1	E of Roopville	Carroll	GA	33.4393°N 85.0868°W	2052–2055	4 mi (6.4 km)	150 yd (140 m)	$150,000	A single family home and a mobile home sustained severe damage. Another single family home sustained minor damage, several barns and outbuildings were damaged, and numerous trees and power lines were downed.
EF3	Prattville to NW of Elmore	Autauga, Elmore	AL	32.3997°N 86.4767°W	2058–2115	14.65 mi (23.58 km)	440 yd (400 m)	$10,100,000	Approximately 200 residential homes and 40 businesses were damaged or destroyed. Hundreds of trees were snapped or uprooted. Fifty people were injured.
EF2	S of Pittsview to NE of Butler	Russell, Stewart, Chattahoochee, Marion, Taylor, Crawford	AL, GA	32.0864°N 85.1621°W	2140–2333	75.63 mi (121.71 km)	1,000 yd (910 m)	$1,000,000	A very long-tracked tornado destroyed four mobile homes, heavily damaged three others, and rolled another. Two frame homes and a barn sustained significant damage, a manufactured home was destroyed, and another mobile home sustained some damage. Nine additional structures were destroyed and three were damaged, mainly manufactured homes. At least one vehicle was flipped and another was damaged by a fallen tree. Numerous trees were snapped or uprooted, and power lines were downed.
EF1	E of Brundidge to E of Clayton	Barbour	AL	31.7071°N 85.6709°W	2217–2238	21.39 mi (34.42 km)	75 yd (69 m)	$35,000	Several mobile homes sustained minor damage and numerous trees were snapped or uprooted.
EF0	SW of Eufaula	Barbour	AL	31.7431°N 85.2887°W	2238–2239	0.4 mi (0.64 km)	300 yd (270 m)	$6,000	A barn was destroyed, a home had shingles torn off its roof, a tin roof was damaged, several trees were snapped or uprooted, and road signs were damaged.
EF0	N of Macon	Jones	GA	32.9513°N 83.6903°W	0001–0004	2.4 mi (3.9 km)	50 yd (46 m)	$50,000	A home sustained substantial roof and window damage. Numerous trees were downed.

=== February 18 event ===
List of confirmed tornadoes – Monday, February 18, 2008
EF#	Location	County / Parish	State	Start Coord.	Time (UTC)	Path length	Max width	Damage	Summary
EF1	Mt. Pleasant	Gadsden	FL	30.6066°N 84.7538°W	0608–0613	6.2 mi (10.0 km)	150 yd (140 m)	$200,000	A tractor trailer was blown over, injuring the occupant. Two mobile homes sustained minor damage, numerous trees were snapped or uprooted, a shed was destroyed, and a 19 ft (580 cm) boat was flipped. Several houses sustained damage, including one that lost its entire roof.
EF0	S of Fowlstown	Decatur	GA	30.7276°N 84.55°W	0638–0639	2.01 mi (3.23 km)	75 yd (69 m)	$75,000	Trees were uprooted, falling on several homes.
EF1	NNE of Cairo	Grady	GA	30.9411°N 84.2°W	0700–0704	3.94 mi (6.34 km)	75 yd (69 m)	$150,000	Several mobile homes had their skirting ripped away or roofs damaged. Numerous trees were snapped or uprooted. A few houses lost shingles. One mobile home had its roof and exterior walls ripped off, and the entire structure was rolled, injuring the occupant. A carport was tossed 200 yd (180 m).
EF2	NNE of Hookerton	Greene	NC	35.4445°N 77.58°W	0845–0850	1.47 mi (2.37 km)	150 yd (140 m)	$500,000	A two-story house was demolished, injuring three occupants. The roof was ripped off a nearby trailer.
EF1	NW of Washington	Pitt, Beaufort	NC	35.63°N 77.2122°W	0930–0945	9.78 mi (15.74 km)	150 yd (140 m)	$100,000	Several outbuildings and old tobacco barns were destroyed, numerous homes sustained roof damage, numerous trees were snapped or uprooted, and a garage structure lost its roof after the garage doors failed.
EF1	Jamesville	Martin	NC	35.7988°N 77.0069°W	0950–1000	6.2 mi (10.0 km)	150 yd (140 m)	$100,000	An outbuilding and a carport were destroyed. The roof was ripped off a used car dealership and flipped onto nearby cars.

=== February 21 event ===
List of confirmed tornadoes – Thursday, February 21, 2008
EF#	Location	County / Parish	State	Start Coord.	Time (UTC)	Path length	Max width	Damage	Summary
EF0	W of Hackberry	Cameron	LA	29.99°N 93.57°W	1951–1952	0.13 mi (0.21 km)	10 yd (9.1 m)	$0	The public reported a brief tornado.
EF0	S of Sulphur	Calcasieu	LA	30.14°N 93.35°W	2018–2019	0.07 mi (0.11 km)	10 yd (9.1 m)	$0	The public reported a brief tornado.
EF0	NW of Lebeau	St. Landry	LA	30.8195°N 92.065°W	2322–2325	0.47 mi (0.76 km)	50 yd (46 m)	$20,000	Tin roofing was blown off a barn and a house, and several trees were downed or snapped.
EF0	ESE of Evergreen	Avoyelles	LA	30.9174°N 91.9992°W	2335–2340	0.68 mi (1.09 km)	50 yd (46 m)	$20,000	Several trees were snapped or uprooted, some of which fell on homes; one carport was destroyed by a fallen tree. A tin metal shed was destroyed as well.

=== February 26 event ===
List of confirmed tornadoes – Tuesday, February 26, 2008
EF#	Location	County / Parish	State	Start Coord.	Time (UTC)	Path length	Max width	Damage	Summary
EF1	Leeds	Jefferson	AL	33.5492°N 86.5654°W	0942–0945	2.8 mi (4.5 km)	500 yd (460 m)	$1,000,000	1 death – An estimated 30–40 homes and 20–30 businesses sustained damage or were destroyed. A tree fell on a mobile home, killing an occupant. Fencing around a softball field was twisted and mangled, a large batting catch was overturned and rolled, and several hundred trees were snapped or uprooted. Tall wooden utility poles were snapped.
EF1	N of Chelsea	Shelby	AL	33.4011°N 86.6577°W	0950–0951	0.49 mi (0.79 km)	150 yd (140 m)	$50,000	Numerous homes sustained mainly roof and siding damage, either from the tornado or by fallen trees. Mailboxes were sucked open, and 20–30 trees were snapped or uprooted.
EF1	S of Pell City	St. Clair	AL	33.5411°N 86.3123°W	1000–1003	2.81 mi (4.52 km)	1,100 yd (1,000 m)	$250,000	Eighteen homes sustained roof or structural damage. Several signs, fences, dugouts, and five outbuildings were damaged. Power lines were downed, and several hundred trees were snapped or uprooted.
EF3	W of Carrollton	Carroll	GA	33.5638°N 85.2905°W	1055–1102	7.21 mi (11.60 km)	100 yd (91 m)	$8,000,000	Six houses and one mobile home were destroyed; two mobile homes sustained major damage; 34 houses sustained moderate damage; 84 houses and one mobile home sustained minor damage. Five businesses were impacted: two were destroyed, two sustained major damage, and two sustained minor damage. One woman was injured.
EF1	E of Carrollton	Carroll	GA	33.58°N 85.0279°W	1110–1112	2 mi (3.2 km)	100 yd (91 m)	$7,000,000	Twenty-four structures sustained minor damage, mainly to their roofs and siding. Numerous trees and power lines were downed. One person was injured.
EF0	W of Roswell	Cobb	GA	34.0388°N 84.4789°W	1125	0.05 mi (0.080 km)	20 yd (18 m)	$5,000	Extensive damage to trees and homes was observed.
EF0	N of Waldo	Alachua	FL	29.79°N 82.17°W	1830	0.01 mi (0.016 km)	20 yd (18 m)	$0	Several structures and the roof of a warehouse were damaged.
EF0	SE of Sanderson	Baker	FL	30.24°N 82.2°W	1937	0.25 mi (0.40 km)	30 yd (27 m)	$0	The roof of a house and a trampoline were damaged.

== See also ==
- Tornadoes of 2008
