= Tornado outbreak sequence of January 7–11, 2008 =

Weather event in the United States

Tornado outbreak of January 2008
Meteorological history
- Duration: January 7–11, 2008

Tornado outbreak
- Tornadoes: 73
- Max. rating: EF3 tornado
- Duration: 3 days, 11 hours, 48 minutes

Overall effects
- Casualties: 4 fatalities (+2 non-tornadic), 62 injuries
- Damage: $88 million (+ $41 million non–tornadic)
- Areas affected: Northwestern, Central and Southern United States
- Part of the Tornadoes of 2008

An unseasonably strong tornado outbreak began on January 7, 2008, and continued for nearly four days across the Central and Southern United States, with the hardest hit area being southwestern Missouri, northwestern Arkansas, and the surrounding area. In addition, a strong supercell in northern Illinois and southeastern Wisconsin produced that region's first January tornadoes since 1967.

More tornadoes occurred across the Mississippi Valley on January 8 and after a break in the activity on January 9, another round of severe weather took place in the Southern United States (primarily Alabama and Mississippi) on January 10. Several damaging tornadoes were reported that day, although no one was killed. A separate, unrelated EF1 tornado also struck the northern suburbs of Vancouver, Washington. In total, over the four-day period, 73 tornadoes were confirmed and four people were killed.

== Meteorological synopsis ==
An unseasonably warm air mass was entrenched over much of central and eastern North America with record highs for much of the region. Several record high temperatures were broken across several states and Canadian provinces from January 7 to January 9 as temperatures rose into the 70s (21–25 °C) as far north as the Ohio Valley with dewpoints in the high 50s and low 60s (14–17 °C) providing additional fuel for storm development.

In addition, many areas near the Great Lakes region reached the mid to upper 60s (17–20 °C) which allowed the northern cells to form, while several areas in southern Ontario and Quebec near the Canada-US border reached near 60 °F (16 °C).

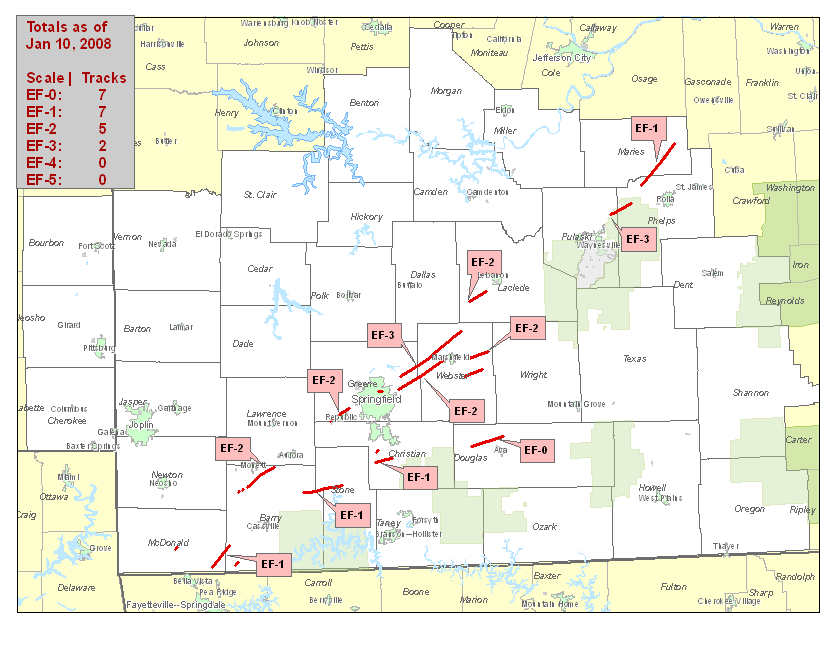
Tornado tracks across Southern Missouri on January 7–8 (Courtesy of NWS Springfield, Missouri)

A strong low-pressure area over the central Great Lakes and its associated cold front combined with intense wind shear to provide a favorable environment for supercell development. Despite only moderate instability (which meant only a slight risk of severe weather was issued by the Storm Prediction Center, and only modest probabilities for severe weather at first), supercells developed throughout the day over much of the central US and continued throughout the evening and overnight hours, continuing into the morning of January 8. The hardest-hit area was in the Ozarks, around Springfield, Missouri, where nearly continuous supercells developed throughout the evening, resulting in numerous tornado touchdowns. In addition to the tornadoes, hail larger than baseballs and damaging straight-line downburst winds as strong as 100 mph (160 km/h) were reported. At least three people were killed in Missouri as a result of the tornadoes. Two of these deaths occurred near Marshfield and there were also six injuries.

Strong tornadoes also touched down further north near Chicago and Milwaukee causing extensive damage along the Wisconsin/Illinois border as well as several injuries. Strong cells and lines also formed in Michigan prompting rare tornado warnings across central parts of Lower Michigan. Scattered thunderstorms were reported in Northern, Central and Southern Ontario on the evening of January 7. Tornado watches extended from eastern Oklahoma to southwestern Ontario on January 7.

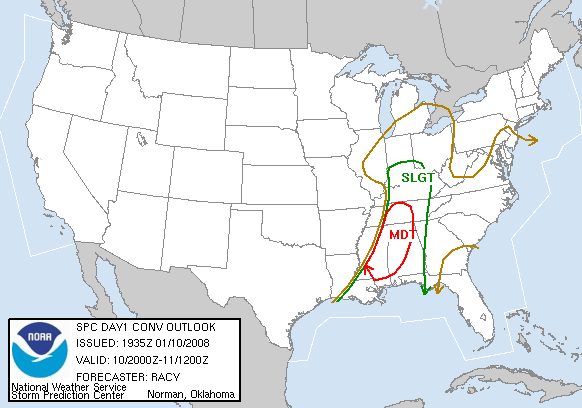
SPC Severe Weather Forecast for January 10, 2008, showing the moderate risk area. (Courtesy of NWS Birmingham, Alabama)

Activity shifted across the Mid-Mississippi Valley on January 8 where tornado watches were issued across Arkansas and Tennessee and later extended across the Ohio Valley to near Columbus, Ohio and Dayton, Ohio until the early morning hours on January 9. A strong tornado in Pope County, Arkansas killed person and additional tornadoes were reported just west of Memphis. During the day, most of the activity was formed into a line that extended from the Ohio Valley to Alabama although thunderstorm-related wind damage was reported as far north as upstate New York and western Pennsylvania.

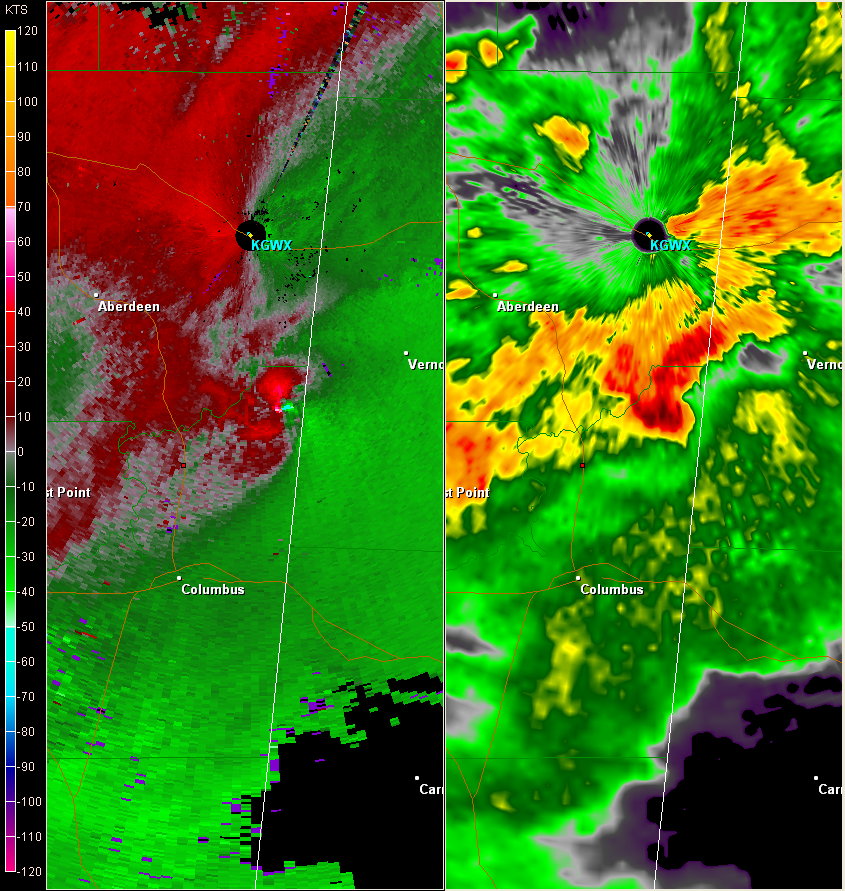
NEXRAD view of a supercell producing an EF3 tornado near Caledonia, Mississippi, displaying relative velocity on the left, and base reflectivity on the right.(Courtesy of NWS Jackson, Mississippi)

After a lull in activity on January 9, a separate system across the Southern United States led to more severe weather, including tornadoes, on January 10. A moderate risk of severe weather was issued by the Storm Prediction Center. Storms developed across Louisiana and Mississippi during the morning and noon periods moving into Alabama with additional storms developing as far north as central and eastern Kentucky where a tornado watch was issued stretching down towards eastern Louisiana and later into Georgia. Multiple strong tornadoes affected Mississippi, Tennessee, and Alabama that evening, including an EF3 tornado that severely damaged the town of Caledonia, Mississippi. More stable air farther east reduced the severe weather potential. In additions to these tornadoes, a rapidly advancing cold front moved into Oregon and Washington generated a severe thunderstorm that produced a damaging EF1 tornado on the north side of Vancouver, Washington on the afternoon of January 10. In addition to the tornado, several funnel clouds were also reported in the area. Wintry weather including snow, sleet and freezing rain on the northern side of the storm was reported from Wisconsin to Maine on January 10–11. Overall, this outbreak sequence killed four people and injured at least 62 others.

== Confirmed tornadoes ==
Confirmed tornadoes by Enhanced Fujita rating
EFU	EF0	EF1	EF2	EF3	EF4	EF5	Total
0	29	29	7	8	0	0	73

=== January 7 event ===
List of confirmed tornadoes – Monday, January 7, 2008 (Note: All dates are based on the local time zone where the tornado touched down; however, all times are in Coordinated Universal Time for consistency.)
EF#	Location	County / Parish	State	Start Coord.	Time (UTC)	Path length	Max width	Damage (Note: All damage totals are in 2008 USD unless otherwise stated.)	Summary
EF0	SW of Lowry City	St. Clair	MO	38.1196°N 93.7683°W	2022–2023	0.07 mi (0.11 km)	20 yd (18 m)	$0	A few trees were damaged.
EF0	SE of Lincoln	Benton	MO	38.3636°N 93.2987°W	2054–2055	0.17 mi (0.27 km)	25 yd (23 m)	$20,000	A local newspaper reported a brief tornado touchdown that heavily damaged a pole barn.
EF3	N of Poplar Grove to NNE of Harvard	Boone, McHenry	IL	42.3874°N 88.83°W	2130–2148	13.2 mi (21.2 km)	100 yd (91 m)	$4,000,000	A shed, a house, and other structures had sections of their roofing ripped off. A large barn was destroyed while a second, poorly constructed one was blown over. A two-story farm house and associated garage were leveled. Several other buildings were severely damaged. A second garage was blown down, a moving freight train was partially derailed, and numerous trees were snapped or uprooted. A semi-trailer was flipped.
EF0	SSW of Mexico	Audrain	MO	39.0687°N 91.9518°W	2155–2156	0.3 mi (0.48 km)	40 yd (37 m)	Unknown	A machine shed and several trees were damaged; numerous tree limbs were downed.
EF3	NE of Pell Lake to NNW of Paddock Lake	Walworth, Kenosha	WI	42.5488°N 88.3334°W	2202–2217	10.78 mi (17.35 km)	200 yd (180 m)	$13,810,000	In Walworth County, three structures sustained minor damage and two structures sustained moderate damage. After crossing into Kenosha County, the tornado impacted Wheatland; 77 homes were affected, 25 sustained minor damage, 27 sustained major damage, and 25 were completely destroyed. In Brighton, 10 homes were affected, 3 sustained minor damage, 3 sustained major damage, and 4 were completely destroyed. Numerous trees were snapped, uprooted, or debarked. Damage to some structures suggested an EF4 rating, but lack of proper anchoring prevented an upgrade. This became the earliest confirmed tornado in Wisconsin.
EF1	Kenosha	Kenosha	WI	42.624°N 87.8659°W	2239–2243	2.48 mi (3.99 km)	75 yd (69 m)	$7,930,000	Two homes sustained minor damage and one home sustained major damage in Somers. In Kenosha, 1 home was affected, 21 sustained minor damage, 6 sustained major damage, and 5 were completely destroyed; a church was destroyed as well. Several power lines were toppled, and dozens of trees were snapped or uprooted.
EF2	SW of Aurora	Barry	MO	36.8159°N 94.008°W	2306–2325	12.43 mi (20.00 km)	200 yd (180 m)	$500,000	Eight mobile homes were destroyed in a mobile home park. Additional houses and farm outbuildings were damaged.
EF1	SSE of Mackinaw	Tazewell	IL	40.5011°N 89.35°W	2322–2325	3 mi (4.8 km)	100 yd (91 m)	$30,000	A pole barn was destroyed while a house and other outbuildings were damaged. A chain link fence and a few tree limbs were downed.
EF0	E of Pineville	McDonald	MO	36.5914°N 94.3264°W	2350–2351	0.25 mi (0.40 km)	20 yd (18 m)	$0	A few trees sustained minor damage.
EF2	Northwestern Republic	Greene	MO	37.1065°N 93.5319°W	2357–0005	6.44 mi (10.36 km)	200 yd (180 m)	$2,000,000	Nearly 15 houses were severely damaged or destroyed. An elementary school sustained major damage to its roof.
EF3	NE of Springfield to E of Lebanon	Greene, Webster, Laclede	MO	37.2754°N 93.1644°W	0029–0133	50.39 mi (81.09 km)	300 yd (270 m)	$19,000,000	3 deaths – A long-tracked and significant tornado caused extensive damage to homes, trees, and outbuildings. One death occurred in rural Greene County while an additional two occurred in Webster County.
EF0	WSW of Republic	Lawrence, Christian	MO	37.0253°N 93.7302°W	0128–0138	6.43 mi (10.35 km)	50 yd (46 m)	$75,000	A few farm houses and outbuildings were damaged.
EF2	NE of Springfield to WNW of Marshfield	Greene, Webster	MO	37.223°N 93.1744°W	0132–0156	15.29 mi (24.61 km)	300 yd (270 m)	$2,000,000	Several homes and outbuildings sustained severe damage.
EF0	N of Bland	Gasconade	MO	38.3878°N 91.636°W	0150–0151	0.28 mi (0.45 km)	50 yd (46 m)	$0	Several trees were uprooted and tree limbs snapped.
EF0	S of Hiwasse	Benton	AR	36.4011°N 94.33°W	0205	0.1 mi (0.16 km)	50 yd (46 m)	$0	Multiple trained storm spotters observed a brief tornado over open country.
EF3	SSE of Dixon	Pulaski, Phelps	MO	36.4011°N 94.33°W	0206–0219	6.44 mi (10.36 km)	400 yd (370 m)	$1,110,000	In Pulaski County, a few homes and outbuildings were destroyed, injuring three people. In Phelps County, one home and several outbuildings were destroyed.
EF0	SW of Watts	Adair	OK	36.0791°N 94.6207°W	0208	0.1 mi (0.16 km)	50 yd (46 m)	$0	Multiple trained storm spotters observed a brief tornado over open country.
EF1	W of Washburn	McDonald, Barry	MO	36.5165°N 94.1439°W	0215–0229	7.43 mi (11.96 km)	100 yd (91 m)	$300,000	Numerous trees and a few structures were heavily damaged or destroyed.
EF0	WNW of Clarksville	Pike	MO	39.3665°N 91.0555°W	0230–0235	4.98 mi (8.01 km)	40 yd (37 m)	$0	Sporadic tree damage was observed.
EF0	W of Nebo	Pike	IL	39.4289°N 90.8439°W	0240–0243	2.35 mi (3.78 km)	40 yd (37 m)	$0	Sporadic tree damage was observed.
EF1	ENE of Elkland	Webster, Dallas	MO	37.4409°N 92.9631°W	0242–0248	5.24 mi (8.43 km)	150 yd (140 m)	$50,000	A home, several outbuildings, and trees were damaged.
EF0	E of Centerton	Benton	AR	36.35°N 94.2081°W	0250	0.1 mi (0.16 km)	50 yd (46 m)	$0	Multiple trained storm spotters reported a brief tornado over open country.
EF2	SW of Lebanon	Laclede	MO	37.5708°N 92.7979°W	0300–0308	5.44 mi (8.75 km)	300 yd (270 m)	$100,000	A home and numerous outbuildings were destroyed.
EF0	W of Seligman	Barry	MO	36.5141°N 93.9932°W	0312–0313	0.12 mi (0.19 km)	20 yd (18 m)	$0	A few trees were damaged.
EF1	S of Nixa	Christian	MO	36.967°N 93.3042°W	0336–0337	0.36 mi (0.58 km)	100 yd (91 m)	$200,000	Numerous homes were damaged and two mobile homes were destroyed. A woman was injured after being hit by flying debris.
EF1	N of Doolittle to S of Belle	Phelps, Maries	MO	38.0115°N 91.8924°W	0340–0458	15.06 mi (24.24 km)	100 yd (91 m)	$5,005,000	In Phelps County, one home sustained roof damage and numerous trees were damaged. In Maries County, approximately 40 structures were damaged, including a mobile home that was destroyed. Four airplanes were damaged at Rolla National Airport, where an ASOS station measured a gust of 96 mph (154 km/h).
EF0	S of Marshfield	Webster	MO	37.1154°N 93.0032°W	0357–0410	10.63 mi (17.11 km)	50 yd (46 m)	$8,000	A few outbuildings and trees sustained minor damage.
EF0	SSW of Oaks	Cherokee	OK	36.0505°N 94.9753°W	0428–0430	1.8 mi (2.9 km)	500 yd (460 m)	$25,000	Two barns and the roofs of several houses were damaged. A number of trees were uprooted.

=== January 8 event ===
List of confirmed tornadoes – Tuesday, January 8, 2008
EF#	Location	County / Parish	State	Start Coord.	Time (UTC)	Path length	Max width	Damage	Summary
EF1	NW of Gentry	Benton	AR	36.3007°N 94.5181°W	0509–0512	2.6 mi (4.2 km)	85 yd (78 m)	$0	Extensive tree damage was observed.
EF0	NE of Porter	Wagoner	OK	35.8905°N 95.4947°W	0538	0.5 mi (0.80 km)	75 yd (69 m)	$0	Extensive tree damage occurred.
EF0	NE of Wagoner	Wagoner	OK	35.9063°N 95.3105°W	0554–0558	2.7 mi (4.3 km)	100 yd (91 m)	$0	Extensive tree damage occurred.
EF1	SSW of Cassville	Barry	MO	36.6114°N 93.9458°W	0822–0826	4.83 mi (7.77 km)	100 yd (91 m)	$300,000	A few houses and outbuildings, as well as numerous trees, sustained damage.
EF1	S of Crane	Barry, Stone	MO	36.8104°N 93.6722°W	0831–0844	12.14 mi (19.54 km)	200 yd (180 m)	$2,000,000	Poultry barns, sheds, and outbuildings were heavily damaged or destroyed. Trees were damaged.
EF1	Springfield	Greene	MO	37.2137°N 93.2808°W	0837–0838	1.13 mi (1.82 km)	50 yd (46 m)	$50,000	A warehouse and a Krispy Kream donut sign were completely destroyed, and several homes sustained minor damage.
EF1	Highlandville	Christian	MO	36.93°N 93.3077°W	0850–0856	4.98 mi (8.01 km)	100 yd (91 m)	$250,000	Numerous structures, several outbuildings, and several highway advertisement signs were damaged.
EF0	W of Kirbyville	Taney	MO	36.6293°N 93.266°W	0901–0903	2.88 mi (4.63 km)	20 yd (18 m)	$75,000	Three condominiums at a golf resort and a mobile home park sustained damage.
EF0	ESE of Marshfield	Webster	MO	37.2795°N 92.8496°W	0916–0920	7.2 mi (11.6 km)	50 yd (46 m)	$15,000	Weak structure and tree damage was observed.
EF0	NNW of Ava	Douglas	MO	36.9803°N 92.8142°W	0917–0926	9.65 mi (15.53 km)	50 yd (46 m)	$75,000	Several barns and outbuildings were damaged or destroyed, and numerous trees were snapped or uprooted.
EF2	ENE of Marshfield	Webster	MO	37.3418°N 92.8633°W	0918–0922	4.73 mi (7.61 km)	150 yd (140 m)	$750,000	Several homes and outbuildings were destroyed.
EF1	NW of Vanzant	Douglas	MO	37.0375°N 92.3658°W	0943–0945	2.23 mi (3.59 km)	75 yd (69 m)	$125,000	A mobile home was moved off its foundation, and significant tree damage was observed.
EF1	WSW of Houston	Wright, Texas	MO	37.1904°N 92.302°W	0945–0953	11.95 mi (19.23 km)	150 yd (140 m)	$200,000	A few barns and outbuildings were damaged.
EF0	NNE of Pottersville	Howell	MO	36.7568°N 91.9931°W	1020–1021	0.36 mi (0.58 km)	20 yd (18 m)	$1,000	Two outbuildings and a mobile home were damaged.
EF1	ESE of Summersville	Shannon	MO	37.133°N 91.5177°W	1027–1028	2.27 mi (3.65 km)	200 yd (180 m)	$1,000	Numerous trees were snapped and uprooted.
EF1	NNE of Winona	Shannon	MO	37.1563°N 91.3117°W	1038–1047	9.83 mi (15.82 km)	200 yd (180 m)	$75,000	Two barns and a garage were destroyed, and numerous trees were snapped or uprooted.
EF0	S of Alton	Oregon	MO	36.6723°N 91.4224°W	1059–1100	1.1 mi (1.8 km)	50 yd (46 m)	$1,000	A few outbuildings were damaged, and a barn sheltering several new motorcycles at a motorcycle shop was destroyed.
EF2	SSW of Moreland to SW of Clinton	Pope, Conway, Van Buren	AR	35.3541°N 93.0075°W	1426–1458	20.46 mi (32.93 km)	440 yd (400 m)	$5,350,000	1 death – A strong tornado began in Pope County, affecting 42 structures: 6 sustained minor damage, 29 sustained moderate to heavy damage, and 7 were destroyed. Six chicken houses, two barns, and a number of outbuildings were destroyed. A travel trailer and motor home were overturned, and one death occurred when a mobile home was destroyed. In Conway County, 3 homes were destroyed and 12 others sustained light to heavy damage. A church and 10 other structures were destroyed, and a cemetery, three natural gas well sites, and 13 additional structures were damaged. Hundreds of trees were downed.
EF1	E of Bloomfield	Stoddard	MO	36.847°N 89.836°W	1840–1845	4.78 mi (7.69 km)	120 yd (110 m)	$250,000	A house was heavily damaged, with its roof ripped off and tossed 100–200 yd (91–183 m). Three outbuildings and an equipment shed were destroyed, a trailer was thrown about 75 yd (69 m), approximately 10 power poles were snapped, windows of vehicles were broken, and a few large trees were snapped. A pump house was thrown into a propane tank, causing a propane leak.
EF0	NNW of Parkin	Cross	AR	35.2629°N 90.6479°W	1926–1936	10.61 mi (17.08 km)	150 yd (140 m)	$25,000	A roof was ripped off a mobile home, and trees and power lines were downed. Several farm water rig pivots were blown over.
EF1	NNW of Gilmore	Poinsett	AR	35.4445°N 90.2921°W	1952–1953	0.15 mi (0.24 km)	25 yd (23 m)	$50,000	A utility and parking shed was completely destroyed, two homes sustained roof damage, and numerous trees were downed.
EF1	NNE of Wilson	Mississippi	AR	35.6406°N 89.9784°W	2020–2025	3.51 mi (5.65 km)	75 yd (69 m)	$100,000	Numerous homes sustained roof damage, many trees were downed, a metal farm equipment building was shifted off its foundation, and a vehicle was destroyed.
EF1	NW of Halls	Lauderdale, Dyer	TN	35.9066°N 89.4623°W	2058–2106	7.81 mi (12.57 km)	25 yd (23 m)	$270,000	A mobile home was shifted off its foundation and destroyed. Numerous homes sustained substantial damage or were shifted off their foundations. Fences were damaged, a garage was collapsed, a machine shed was destroyed, several power lines were downed, and numerous trees were snapped or uprooted.
EF0	W of Fayette	Jefferson	MS	31.6949°N 91.2411°W	2130–2137	4.86 mi (7.82 km)	50 yd (46 m)	$0	Several trees were downed.
EF1	NW of Harrisville to S of Puckett	Simpson	MS	31.99°N 90.1°W	2337–0015	19.41 mi (31.24 km)	125 yd (114 m)	$600,000	A framed house had a large section of its roof ripped off. One outbuilding was destroyed and blown away while several others sustained damage to their tin roofs. A home sustained shingle damage, power lines were downed, and numerous trees were snapped or uprooted.
EF0	SE of Puckett	Rankin	MS	32.06°N 89.75°W	0011–0012	0.4 mi (0.64 km)	50 yd (46 m)	$12,000	A home sustained shingle damage and trees were downed.

=== January 10 event ===
List of confirmed tornadoes – Thursday, January 10, 2008
EF#	Location	County / Parish	State	Start Coord.	Time (UTC)	Path length	Max width	Damage	Summary
EF1	SSE of Rocky Springs	Claiborne	MS	32.0741°N 90.8003°W	1727–1732	3.14 mi (5.05 km)	250 yd (230 m)	$80,000	Significant tree damage occurred in a very rural area, with hundreds of trees snapped and uprooted, and a few power poles were downed as well.
EF3	WNW of Pickens to ENE of Goodman	Holmes, Attala	MS	32.8954°N 89.9979°W	1751–1805	9.73 mi (15.66 km)	1,320 yd (1,210 m)	$3,870,000	A narrow path of scattered downed trees occurred near the start of the track before the damage became much more intense, with hundreds of trees snapped and uprooted, and one home had part of its roof ripped off. The tornado reached maximum intensity between MS 17 and US 51. Hundreds more trees were snapped and uprooted, some of which were hardwoods that were completely snapped off except for some large limbs and partially debarked. Several mobile homes were destroyed, and two homes built with wood frames and concrete blocks had almost all outer walls collapsed and roofs completely removed. A pickup truck was thrown nearly 150 yards (140 m), and further along the track, three high tension steel power poles were snapped off near their bases. The tornado then crossed into Attala County and snapped or uprooted many more trees before it weakened and dissipated. This was the first of three EF3 tornadoes spawned by the same supercell. Three people were injured.
EF3	WNW of Ethel to SSE of Ackerman	Attala, Choctaw	MS	33.132°N 89.5233°W	1828–1858	23.59 mi (37.96 km)	880 yd (800 m)	$6,200,000	The tornado touched down west of Ethel and produced a path of tree damage that intensified shortly after beginning. The tornado reached its widest point as it crossed the Natchez Trace Parkway, snapping and uprooting several dozen trees. Significant structural damage occurred to some buildings just southwest of McCool, and one cinder block building was almost completely destroyed. A room added to the back of a frame home was removed as well. After passing McCool, the tornado narrowed and weakened, while continuing to produce tree damage. The tornado again intensified after crossing into Choctaw County, and a dairy complex was heavily damaged south of Weir. A well-constructed milking parlor was completely destroyed, with all exterior walls collapsed or destroyed. A large 9,000 lb (4,100 kg) trailer was picked up and flipped on top of a farm building, and a few metal and wood livestock buildings and grain silo were destroyed. In addition, 300 head of cattle were injured, and ten were killed. A path of tree damage continued for a few miles before the tornado dissipated. This was the second of three EF3 tornadoes produced by the same supercell. Three people were injured.
EF0	N of Fannin to S of Goshen Springs	Rankin	MS	32.4356°N 89.9554°W	1839–1841	1.81 mi (2.91 km)	40 yd (37 m)	$10,000	A brief, weak tornado touched down north of Fannin and snapped several large pine trees.
EF0	W of Dixons Mills	Marengo	AL	32.0542°N 87.8184°W	1908–1909	0.46 mi (0.74 km)	200 yd (180 m)	$100,000	Four homes sustained minor damage and several trees were snapped.
EF1	W of New Roads	Pointe Coupee	LA	30.68°N 91.4637°W	1910–1912	0.25 mi (0.40 km)	30 yd (27 m)	$1,500,000	A brief tornado touched down and damaged several industrial buildings of a farm equipment dealer. Several large doors were blown in, a few windows were broken, and most of a roof was torn off. Debris was scattered about 0.25 miles (0.40 km) into an open field and trees and a railroad crossing arm was broken off as well.
EF0	SW of Pearl River	Neshoba	MS	32.7655°N 89.25°W	1942–1946	1.47 mi (2.37 km)	75 yd (69 m)	$130,000	Two homes had minor damage: one had its porch damaged and another had shingles torn off. Two outbuildings had their roofs blown off and several trees were snapped or uprooted along the path.
EF1	SE of Midway	Tishomingo	MS	34.7168°N 88.2335°W	1954–1958	2.78 mi (4.47 km)	100 yd (91 m)	$25,000	Two homes had minor damage and two metal side panels were blown off of two large sheds. Tree damage also occurred, with about three dozen trees uprooted, some trees snapped and twisted, and additional smaller trees snapped.
EF1	N of Bon Ayr to SE of Park City	Barren	KY	37.0599°N 86.069°W	2002–2006	3.07 mi (4.94 km)	350 yd (320 m)	$600,000	Nine barns were destroyed, one home had minor roof damage, and another home had its front porch torn off. Many trees were snapped or uprooted as well, and a path of straight line wind damage continued for about 1.5 miles (2.4 km) after the tornado lifted.
EF3	E of Kolola Springs, MS to W of Vernon, AL	Lowndes (MS), Lamar (AL)	MS, AL	33.6558°N 88.3733°W	2009–2025	13.35 mi (21.48 km)	2,500 yd (2,300 m)	$7,105,000	A home, a shed, power poles and trees were damaged near the start of the path, and another shed was damaged and the combine harvester inside was thrown into some trees. After the tornado passed through a wooded area, eight well-built homes in a neighborhood were damaged, and about five sustained severe damage. The tornado then moved into the Caledonia school complex and reached maximum intensity. The press box and concession stand of a football stadium were destroyed, several metal power poles were bent, and several trees were knocked down. Cars were moved up to 100 yards (91 m), and some cars were flipped or had windows broken. Five school buses were destroyed, two of which were flipped over, and one was lifted up and ripped apart. The gymnasium and another building were nearly destroyed, with several vehicles landing inside them. Six homes sustained significant damage, mainly to roofs, as the tornado moved across the south side of Caledonia. A church was completely destroyed when the roof was lifted up and collapsed on the building, and another church had minor roof damage. Further along the track, tree damage occurred in a wooded area, and many more homes were severely damaged. Many hardwood trees were snapped, a few of which fell on cars and homes, and a horse stable was completely destroyed. Several mobile homes were also destroyed, a high tension metal truss tower was snapped, and cars were moved up to 50 yards (46 m) in this area. The tornado weakened and continued to produce tree damage as it passed into Alabama. In Alabama, two homes were unroofed, two wooden barns were destroyed, and the foundations of two mobile homes were moved before the tornado lifted northeast of the town of Molloy. This was the third of three EF3 tornadoes produced by the same supercell. 15 people were injured.
EF1	NW of Hazel Dell to WNW of Hockinson	Clark	WA	45.6787°N 122.6924°W	2015–2040	10.11 mi (16.27 km)	440 yd (400 m)	$525,000	A tornado touched down multiple times between Hazel Dell and Hockinson. Along the path, 30 to 40 homes were damaged, mostly with roof damage, three lightly constructed structures were destroyed, and a semi trailer was tipped over. Several dozen boats were damaged, 19 power poles were snapped and over 200 trees were downed as well.
EF2	SE of Ashland	Wayne	TN	35.3243°N 87.587°W	2055–2056	1.29 mi (2.08 km)	400 yd (370 m)	$200,000	A 30 by 30-foot metal barn was completely destroyed, with sheets of metal from the barn carried about half a mile away into Lawrence County, and other metal barns had most of their roofs blown off. Some homes lost shingles, and a dog house that was anchored onto a concrete platform was blown away. In addition, several trees were snapped at the trunk, a wooden plank was planted into the ground, and many trees were uprooted near the Natchez Trace Parkway.
EF1	NE of Macon	Noxubee	MS	33.1544°N 88.4811°W	2058–2101	1.87 mi (3.01 km)	75 yd (69 m)	$30,000	A brief tornado downed five power poles, two of which were snapped.
EF0	SSW of Bigbee Valley	Noxubee	MS	33.1804°N 88.3984°W	2102–2104	0.76 mi (1.22 km)	40 yd (37 m)	$0	A brief, weak tornado touched down shortly after the previous event. A few trees had tops blown off and many tree limbs were snapped and downed along the path.
EF0	Southern Pickensville	Pickens	AL	33.2224°N 88.268°W	2110	0.04 mi (0.064 km)	50 yd (46 m)	$10,000	A brief tornado touched down on the southern side of Pickensville, damaging a metal storage barn and blowing down several trees.
EF1	ESE of Gordo to SW of Echola	Pickens, Tuscaloosa	AL	33.3133°N 87.8629°W	2143–2146	2.03 mi (3.27 km)	100 yd (91 m)	$55,000	A barn and several chicken houses sustained heavy damage, and minor tree damage occurred.
EF3	N of Tuscaloosa	Tuscaloosa	AL	33.482°N 87.5095°W	2211–2217	5.62 mi (9.04 km)	350 yd (320 m)	$435,000	At least five structures, including a church and a general store, were heavily damaged. At least 300 trees were snapped or uprooted.

=== January 11 event ===
List of confirmed tornadoes – Friday, January 11, 2008
EF#	Location	County / Parish	State	Start Coord.	Time (UTC)	Path length	Max width	Damage	Summary
EF1	Blue Springs	Barbour	AL	31.6402°N 85.5289°W	0804–0810	3.48 mi (5.60 km)	150 yd (140 m)	$75,000	Four houses and a mobile home sustained roof damage, including one that had its covered deck ripped off. Several large trees were snapped, twisted, or uprooted.

== Non-tornadic events ==
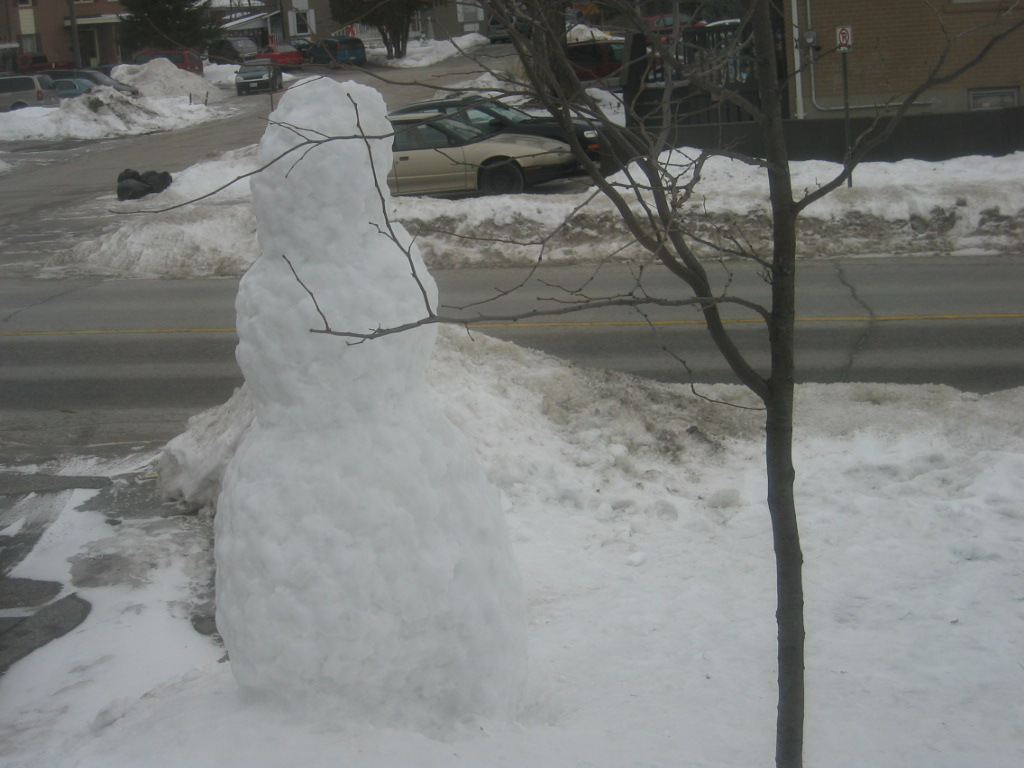
An image of a snowman taken three weeks prior to the melt.

The storm system was also responsible for heavy flooding rains across much of the Midwest from Michigan to Missouri as well as dense fog across Wisconsin, Ontario and Quebec which was caused by rapid snow melt stemming from the January thaw. flooding was reported across several towns and roads which forced the evacuation of some residents. Record-breaking temperatures were reported all across Southern Ontario and surrounding areas. The thick fog lead to numerous accidents including two pile-ups involving in total 100 vehicles on I-90 near Madison, Wisconsin which killed at least two and injured dozens more while additional fatal accidents occurred elsewhere. It also disrupted air travel across several airports. Rainfall had exceeded locally 4 inches (100 mm) of rain from Missouri to Indiana and Michigan.

High winds and rain have battered Central, southern and eastern Ontario and southern and central Quebec on January 8, and 9. Power outages and wind damages were reported in some areas. As much as 140,000 Hydro One customers were without power in Ontario and at least 100,000 Hydro-Québec customers in Quebec. Winds were gusting in near on in excess of 100 km/h in some localities including the Greater Toronto Area while the highest peak being 133 km/h recorded near Sandbanks Provincial Park in Prince Edward County. One tractor trailer was overturned and nearly fell into the Saint Lawrence River on the Ogdensburg-Prescott International Bridge

== See also ==
- List of North American tornadoes and tornado outbreaks
- List of tornadoes striking downtown areas
- 1967 St. Louis tornado outbreak – Similar rare tornado outbreak in January in the Midwest
