= New Munster =

New Munster may refer to:

== Places ==
New Zealand

- New Munster Province, a former province of New Zealand, consisting of the South Island alone (1846–53) and for some time additionally of Stewart Island (1841-46)
  - New Munster, old name for the South Island

United States

- New Munster, Wisconsin, an unincorporated community
