= Mississippi Highway 471 =

Highway in Mississippi

Mississippi Highway 471

Route information
- Maintained by MDOT
- Length: 17.762 mi (28.585 km)
- Existed: 1940s–present

Major junctions
- South end: US 80 in Brandon
- MS 25 / MS 471 Bus. in Flowood; MS 25 in Sandhill
- North end: MS 43 in Goshen Springs

Location
- Country: United States
- State: Mississippi
- Counties: Rankin

Highway system
- Mississippi State Highway System; Interstate; US; State
← MS 469	→ MS 472

Mississippi Highway 471 (MS 471) is a highway in Central Mississippi. The southern terminus is at US 80 in Brandon. The northern terminus is at MS 43 in Goshen Springs.

== Route description ==
MS 471 begins at an intersection with US 80 in Brandon and is a four-lane undivided highway. From there, the highway goes above I-20 on an overpass (no interchange) and goes through exurban areas while becoming a two-lane highway. MS 471 has an interchange with Mississippi Highway 25 and goes through the unincorporated community of Goshen Springs. The road comes to an intersection with Sand Hill Road, turning left. The highway eventually comes to an end at an intersection with MS 43 near the Ross Barnett Reservoir.

== Major intersections ==
The entire route is in Rankin County.

Location	mi	km	Destinations	Notes
Brandon	0.00	0.00	US 80 to I-20 – Jackson, Meridian	Southern terminus
Flowood	6.4	10.3	MS 25 south / MS 471 Bus. north – Jackson, Fannin	South end of MS 25 overlap; southern terminus of MS 471 Bus
Sandhill	12.8	20.6	MS 25 north – Carthage	North end of MS 25 overlap
Sandhill	13.1	21.1	MS 471 Bus. south – Fannin	Northern terminus of MS 471 Bus
Goshen Springs	17.3	27.8	MS 43 – Pelahatchie, Canton	Northern terminus
1.000 mi = 1.609 km; 1.000 km = 0.621 mi: Concurrency terminus

== Related routes ==
Mississippi Highway 471 Business
- Location: Fannin
- Length: 6.3 mi (10.1 km)

=== Highway 471 Business ===
Mississippi Highway 471 Business (MS 471 Bus.) is an unsigned business route of Mississippi Highway 471 (MS 471) in Fannin.

Major intersections
The entire route is in Rankin County.

Location	mi	km	Destinations	Notes
Flowood	0.00	0.00	MS 25 / MS 471 – Jackson, Carthage, Brandon	Southern terminus
	6.3	10.1	MS 471 to MS 25 – Goshen Springs, Brandon	Northern terminus
1.000 mi = 1.609 km; 1.000 km = 0.621 mi
