= Lily Lake, Wisconsin =

Census-designated place in Wisconsin, United States

- Census-designated place
- Location within Wisconsin Location within the United States
- Coordinates: 42°34′01″N 88°12′49″W
- Country: United States
- State: Wisconsin
- County: Kenosha
- Town: Wheatland

Area
  - Total: 0.658 sq mi (1.70 km^{2})
  - Land: 0.525 sq mi (1.36 km^{2})
  - Water: 0.133 sq mi (0.34 km^{2})
- Elevation: 791 ft (241 m)

Population (2020)
  - Total: 508
  - Density: 908.6/sq mi (350.8/km^{2})
- Time zone: UTC-6 (Central (CST))
  - Summer (DST): UTC-5 (CDT)
- Area code: 262
- GNIS feature ID: 2586526

Lily Lake is a census-designated place in the town of Wheatland, Kenosha County, Wisconsin, United States. Its population was 508 as of the 2020 census.

== Demographics ==
Historical population
Census	Pop.	Note	%±
2010	477		—
2020	508		6.5%
U.S. Decennial Census

=== 2020 census ===
Lily Lake CDP, Wisconsin – Racial and ethnic composition Note: the US Census treats Hispanic/Latino as an ethnic category. This table excludes Latinos from the racial categories and assigns them to a separate category. Hispanics/Latinos may be of any race.
Race / Ethnicity (NH = Non-Hispanic)	Pop 2010	Pop 2020	% 2010	% 2020
White alone (NH)	455	481	95.39%	94.69%
Black or African American alone (NH)	1	0	0.21%	0.00%
Native American or Alaska Native alone (NH)	3	0	0.63%	0.00%
Asian alone (NH)	1	2	0.21%	0.39%
Native Hawaiian or Pacific Islander alone (NH)	0	0	0.00%	0.00%
Other race alone (NH)	0	0	0.00%	0.00%
Mixed race or Multiracial (NH)	3	12	0.63%	2.36%
Hispanic or Latino (any race)	14	13	2.94%	2.56%
Total	477	508	100.00%	100.00%
