= Bloomfield (village), Wisconsin =

Bloomfield, Wisconsin
- Village
- Location of Bloomfield in Walworth County, Wisconsin.

- Location within Wisconsin
- Coordinates: 42°32′56″N 88°21′08″W
- Country: United States
- State: Wisconsin
- County: Walworth

Area
  - Total: 13.00 sq mi (33.67 km^{2})
  - Land: 12.51 sq mi (32.39 km^{2})
  - Water: 0.49 sq mi (1.28 km^{2})
- Elevation: 863 ft (263 m)

Population (2020)
  - Total: 4,781
  - Density: 379.6/sq mi (146.55/km^{2})
- Time zone: UTC-6 (Central (CST))
  - Summer (DST): UTC-5 (CDT)
- Area code: 262
- FIPS code: 55-08265
- GNIS feature ID: 2711667
- Website: https://villageofbloomfield.com/

Bloomfield is a village in Walworth County, Wisconsin, United States. The village was created on December 20, 2011, from unincorporated areas of the Town of Bloomfield. It includes all of the Pell Lake census-designated place and part of the Powers Lake census-designated place. The population was 4,781 as of the 2020 census.

== Demographics ==
According to the United States Census Bureau, Bloomfield had a population of 4,781 as of 2020. It had approximately 2,078 households, with 1,684 families living in them, of whom 518 residents of Bloomfield were reported to be Hispanic or Latino.

Historical population
| Census | Pop. | Note | %± |
|---|---|---|---|
| 2020 | 4,781 | | — |
U.S. Decennial Census
