= Slades Corners, Wisconsin =

- Unincorporated community
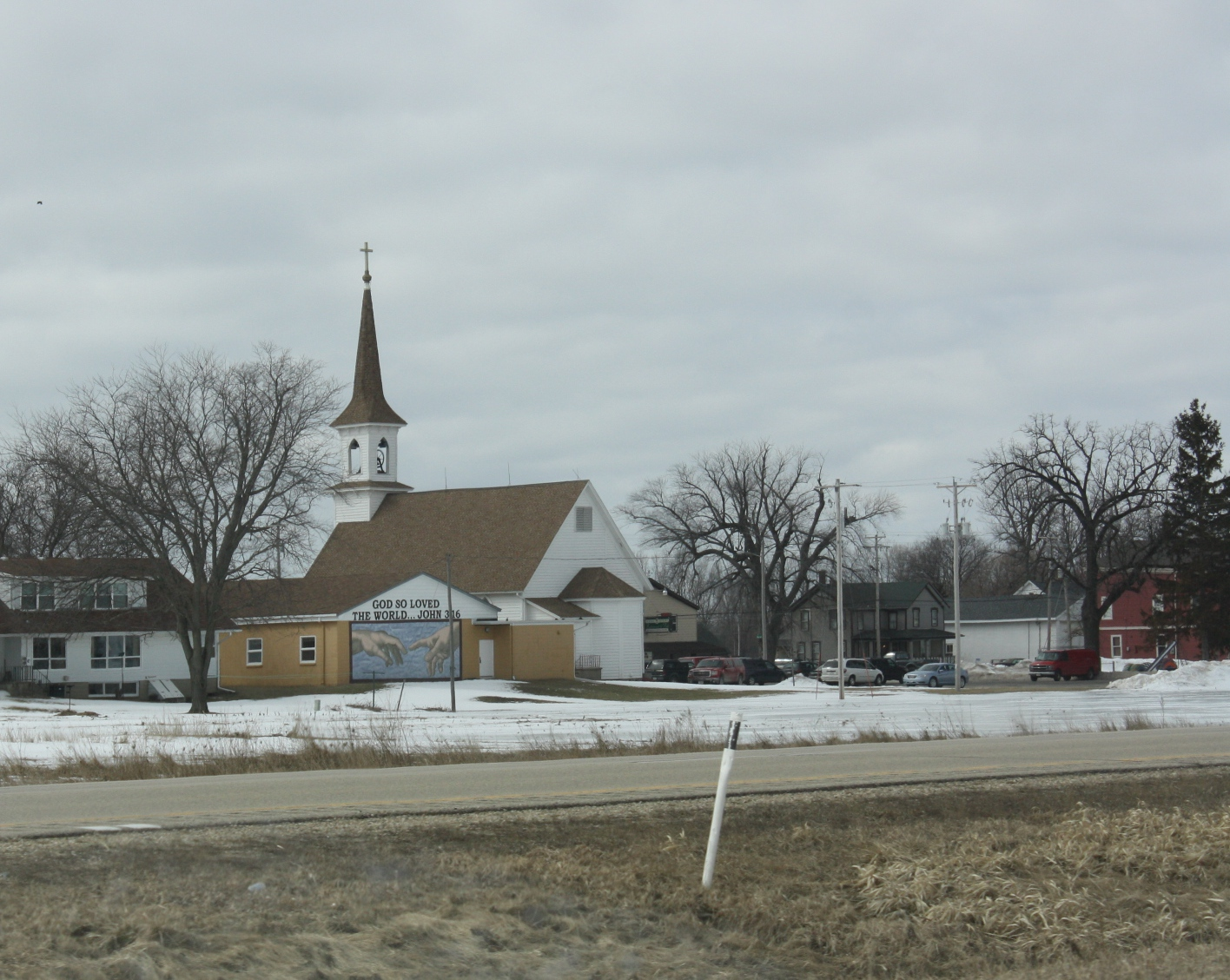
- Downtown Slades Corners from Wisconsin Highway 50

- Location within Wisconsin Location within the United States
- Coordinates: 42°34′55″N 88°17′38″W
- Country: United States
- State: Wisconsin
- County: Kenosha
- Town: Wheatland
- Elevation: 866 ft (264 m)
- Time zone: UTC-6 (Central (CST))
  - Summer (DST): UTC-5 (CDT)
- Area code: 262
- GNIS feature ID: 1574263

Slades Corners is a small unincorporated residential and agricultural community located on Old Highway 50 and 400th Avenue (Kenosha County Highway P, or Dyer Lake Road) in the western Kenosha County, Wisconsin town of Wheatland, United States. Slades Corners is named for Tom Slade, an early resident who settled 640 acres (2.6 km^{2}) there in approximately 1840, eight years before Wisconsin statehood.
