= Powers Lake, Wisconsin =

Census-designated place in Wisconsin, United States

Powers Lake, Wisconsin Lakeville or Nippersink
- Census-designated place
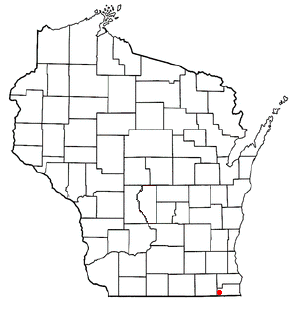
- Location of Powers Lake, Wisconsin
- Coordinates: 42°32′20″N 88°17′53″W
- Country: United States
- State: Wisconsin
- County: Kenosha
- Towns: Randall, Wheatland

Area
  - Total: 3.074 sq mi (7.96 km^{2})
  - Land: 2.217 sq mi (5.74 km^{2})
  - Water: 0.857 sq mi (2.22 km^{2})
- Elevation: 869 ft (265 m)

Population (2020)
  - Total: 1,401
  - Density: 728.5/sq mi (281.3/km^{2})
- Time zone: UTC-6 (Central Standard Time)
  - Summer (DST): UTC-5 (CDT)
- ZIP Code: 53159
- Area code: 262
- FIPS code: 55-64825
- GNIS feature ID: 1571858
- Website: districtofpowerslake.com

Powers Lake is a census-designated place (CDP) in the towns of Randall and Wheatland, in Kenosha County in the U.S. state of Wisconsin. As of the 2020 census, the CDP had a population of 1,401. Part of the Powers Lake CDP was in Walworth County, but on December 20, 2011, it became part of the village of Bloomfield.

== History ==
Originally called Lakeville and then Nippersink, Powers Lake was named after James B. Powers, one of its early settlers and first postmasters. The farming community appreciated the fertile Wisconsin soil and access to a water supply. Recreational activities garnered interest around the lakes in the 1880s, but it was in the 1890s that fishermen and others, primarily from Chicago, enjoyed long visits in the area and eventually developed the North Shore of Powers Lake. Ice companies also ‘mined’ the south shores of Powers Lake and the north shore of Benedict Lake in the 1890s, eventually establishing five ice houses on Powers Lake.

== Geography ==
Powers Lake is located at 42°32'20" North, 88°17'53" West (42.538813, -88.298027).

According to the United States Census Bureau, the CDP has a total area of 3.1 square miles (8.0 km^{2}), of which 2.2 square miles (5.7 km^{2}) is land and 0.9 square miles (2.3 km^{2}) is water. The total area is 27.88% water.

== Demographics ==
Historical population
Census	Pop.	Note	%±
2000	1,500		—
2010	1,615		7.7%
2020	1,401		−13.3%
U.S. Decennial Census

=== 2020 census ===
Powers Lake CDP, Wisconsin – Racial and ethnic composition Note: the US Census treats Hispanic/Latino as an ethnic category. This table excludes Latinos from the racial categories and assigns them to a separate category. Hispanics/Latinos may be of any race.
Race / Ethnicity (NH = Non-Hispanic)	Pop 2000	Pop 2010	Pop 2020	% 2000	% 2010	% 2020
White alone (NH)	1,439	1,524	1,284	95.93%	94.37%	91.65%
Black or African American alone (NH)	5	5	1	0.33%	0.31%	0.07%
Native American or Alaska Native alone (NH)	2	1	2	0.13%	0.06%	0.14%
Asian alone (NH)	3	5	3	0.20%	0.31%	0.21%
Native Hawaiian or Pacific Islander alone (NH)	0	0	0	0.00%	0.00%	0.00%
Other race alone (NH)	0	7	5	0.00%	0.43%	0.36%
Mixed race or Multiracial (NH)	19	7	40	1.27%	0.43%	2.86%
Hispanic or Latino (any race)	32	66	66	2.13%	4.09%	4.71%
Total	1,500	1,615	1,401	100.00%	100.00%	100.00%

=== 2000 census ===
As of the census of 2000, there were 1,500 people, 544 households, and 405 families residing in the CDP. The population density was 783.6 inhabitants per square mile (302.5/km^{2}). There were 855 housing units at an average density of 446.6 units per square mile (172.4 units/km^{2}). The racial makeup of the CDP was 97.53% White, 0.33% African American, 0.13% Native American, 0.27% Asian, 0.00% Pacific Islander, 0.07% from other races, and 1.67% from two or more races. 2.13% of the population were Hispanic or Latino of any race.

There were 544 households, out of which 38.2% had children under the age of 18 living with them, 59.6% were married couples living together, 10.8% had a female householder with no husband present, and 25.4% were non-families. 20.0% of all households were made up of individuals, and 7.7% had someone living alone who was 65 years of age or older. The average household size was 2.73 and the average family size was 3.15.

In the CDP, the population was spread out, with 28.5% under the age of 18, 6.6% from 18 to 24, 32.3% from 25 to 44, 21.2% from 45 to 64, and 11.5% who were 65 years of age or older. The median age was 36 years. For every 100 females, there were 98.4 males. For every 100 females age 18 and over, there were 92.6 males.

The median income for a household in the CDP was $53,403, and the median income for a family was $53,264. Males had a median income of $42,000 versus $26,736 for females. The per capita income for the CDP was $22,766. 7.4% of the population and 6.6% of families were below the poverty line. 3.0% of those under the age of 18 and 9.7% of those 65 and older were living below the poverty line.

== Organizations ==
Powers Lake has many groups and organizations, including the Powers Lake Yacht Club, which has been sailing on these waters for many years.
