= Wheatland, Kenosha County, Wisconsin =

Town of Wheatland, Wisconsin
- Town
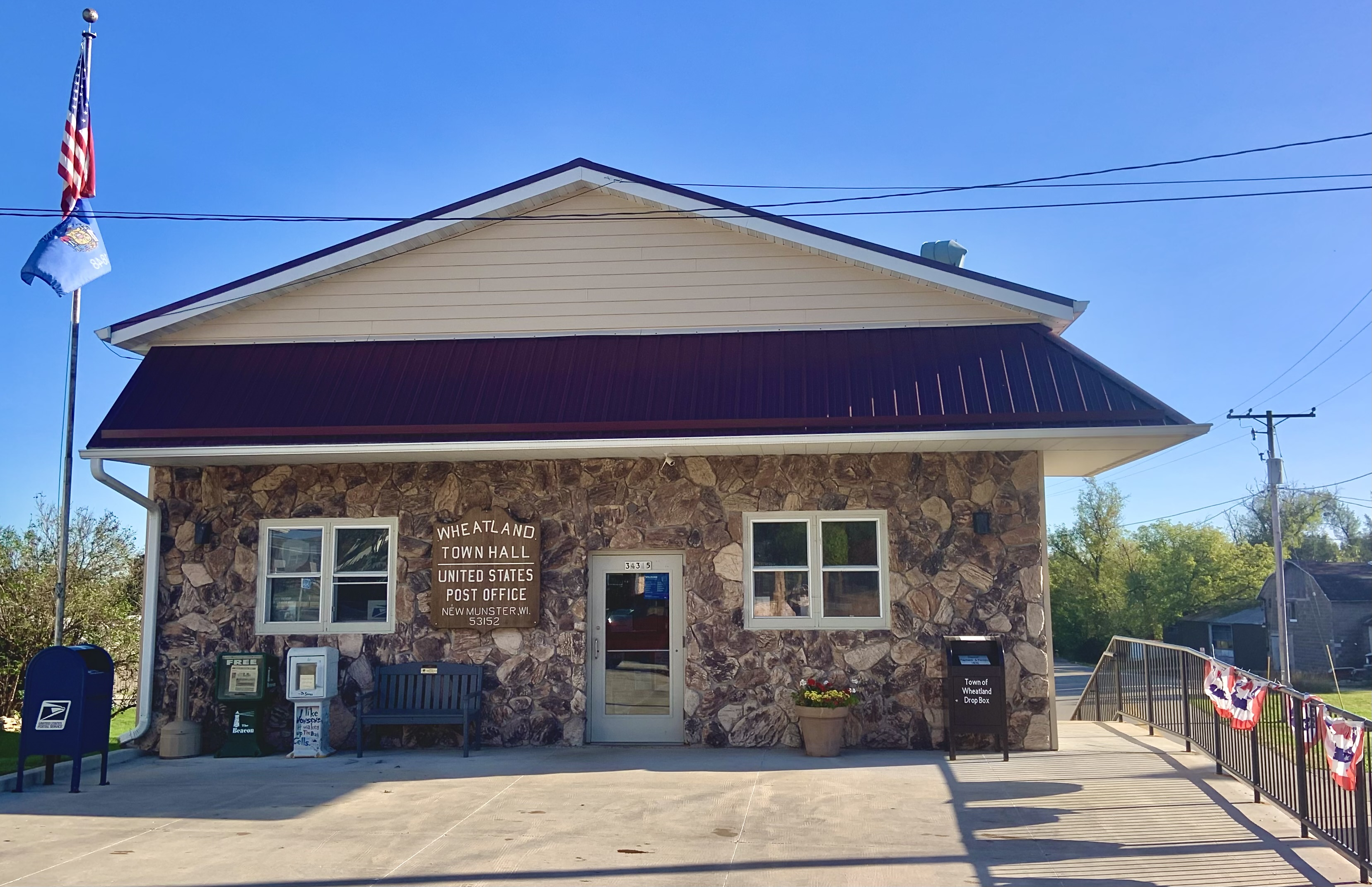
- Town hall

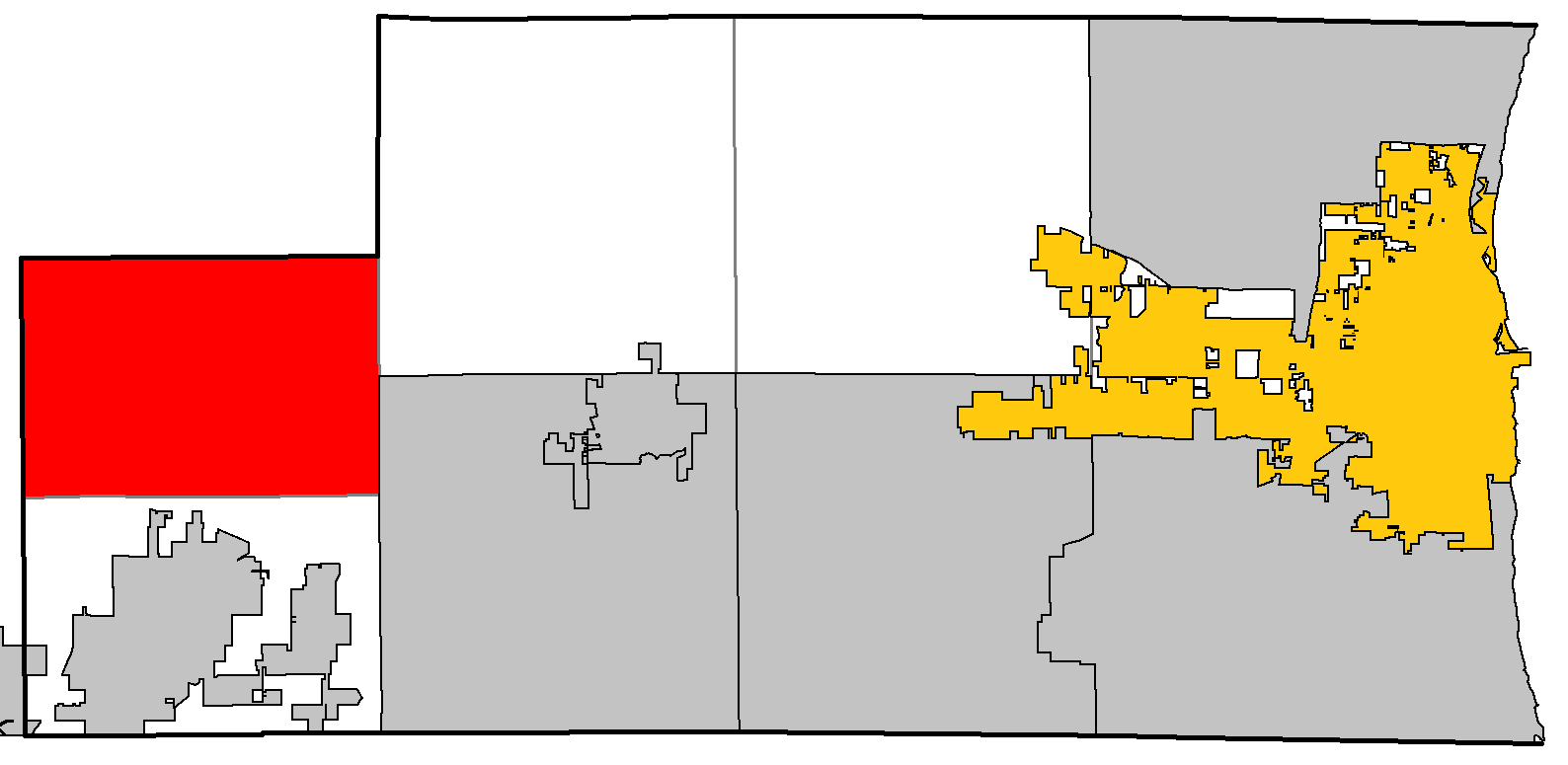
- Location of the Town of Wheatland, within Kenosha County
- Coordinates: 42°34′37″N 88°13′35″W
- Country: United States
- State: Wisconsin
- County: Kenosha

Area
  - Total: 24.1 sq mi (62.3 km^{2})
  - Land: 23.7 sq mi (61.5 km^{2})
  - Water: 0.31 sq mi (0.8 km^{2})
- Elevation: 807 ft (246 m)

Population (2020)
  - Total: 3,391
  - Density: 143/sq mi (55.1/km^{2})
- Time zone: UTC-6 (Central (CST))
  - Summer (DST): UTC-5 (CDT)
- Area code: 262
- FIPS code: 55-86500
- GNIS feature ID: 1584421
- Website: townwheatland.com

Wheatland is a town in Kenosha County, Wisconsin, United States. The population was 3,391 at the 2020 census. The census-designated place of Powers Lake is located partially in the town. The unincorporated communities of Lily Lake, New Munster, and Slades Corners are also located in the town.

Settlement in the town is centered along 328th Avenue (Kenosha County Highway W) north of 60th Street (Kenosha County Highway K). The former Wisconsin Central Railway Chicago-Twin Cities main line (now the Canadian National Railway) also runs through the town; a passenger and freight station used was located here well into the 20th century.

== Geography ==
According to the United States Census Bureau, the town has a total area of 24.1 square miles (62.3 km^{2}), of which 23.7 square miles (61.5 km^{2}) are land and 0.3 square miles (0.8 km^{2}), or 1.36%, are water.

== History ==
The first settlers in Wheatland were Schuyler Bonday in August 1837 and Adolph Reitbrook in September 1837. Wheatland was formed on May 7, 1842. Its name is derived from the wheat which was said to grow well in the rich soil in the area. The first constable was James B. Powers, for whom Powers Lake is named.

When the Town of Wheatland was formed, it was originally in Racine County. On January 30, 1850, the town was transferred to Kenosha County, where it remains today.

== Demographics ==
Historical population
Census	Pop.	Note	%±
2000	3,292		—
2010	3,373		2.5%
2020	3,391		0.5%
U.S. Decennial Census

=== 2020 census ===
Wheatland town, Kenosha County, Wisconsin – Racial and ethnic composition Note: the US Census treats Hispanic/Latino as an ethnic category. This table excludes Latinos from the racial categories and assigns them to a separate category. Hispanics/Latinos may be of any race.
Race / Ethnicity (NH = Non-Hispanic)	Pop 2000	Pop 2010	Pop 2020	% 2000	% 2010	% 2020
White alone (NH)	3,207	3,227	3,109	97.42%	95.67%	91.68%
Black or African American alone (NH)	16	12	11	0.49%	0.36%	0.32%
Native American or Alaska Native alone (NH)	7	5	3	0.21%	0.15%	0.09%
Asian alone (NH)	8	28	20	0.24%	0.83%	0.59%
Native Hawaiian or Pacific Islander alone (NH)	0	0	1	0.00%	0.00%	0.03%
Other race alone (NH)	0	4	0	0.00%	0.12%	0.00%
Mixed race or Multiracial (NH)	22	22	125	0.67%	0.65%	3.69%
Hispanic or Latino (any race)	32	75	122	0.97%	2.22%	3.60%
Total	3,292	3,373	3,391	100.00%	100.00%	100.00%

=== 2000 census ===
As of the census of 2000, there were 3,292 people, 1,209 households, and 893 families residing in the town. The population density was 139.8 inhabitants per square mile (54.0/km^{2}). There were 1,379 housing units at an average density of 58.6 per square mile (22.6/km^{2}). The racial makeup of the town was 98.12% White, 0.49% African American, 0.21% Native American, 0.24% Asian, 0.27% from other races, and 0.67% from two or more races. Hispanic or Latino of any race were 0.97% of the population.

There were 1,209 households, out of which 36.0% had children under the age of 18 living with them, 60.0% were married couples living together, 9.5% had a female householder with no husband present, and 26.1% were non-families. 20.7% of all households were made up of individuals, and 7.1% had someone living alone who was 65 years of age or older. The average household size was 2.72 and the average family size was 3.15.

In the town, the population was spread out, with 26.9% under the age of 18, 8.1% from 18 to 24, 30.3% from 25 to 44, 25.3% from 45 to 64, and 9.4% who were 65 years of age or older. The median age was 37 years. For every 100 females, there were 104.6 males. For every 100 females age 18 and over, there were 99.3 males.

The median income for a household in the town was $52,386, and the median income for a family was $61,797. Males had a median income of $43,000 versus $27,917 for females. The per capita income for the town was $21,299. About 3.5% of families and 5.3% of the population were below the poverty line, including 3.2% of those under age 18 and 5.9% of those age 65 or over.

== January 2008 tornado ==
A tornado touched down in the town on January 7, 2008. The tornado was rated EF3 on the Enhanced Fujita Scale, with winds estimated at 140-150 mph. Its path covered 10.8 miles (17.4 km) and was 200 yards (180 m) wide, demolishing 25 houses and damaging about 100 more. This left 160 people homeless or unable to return to their homes. The damage was estimated at $18 million.
