= New Munster, Wisconsin =

Census-designated place in Wisconsin, United States

- Unincorporated community and Census-designated place
- Location within Wisconsin Location within the United States
- Coordinates: 42°34′46″N 88°13′40″W
- Country: United States
- State: Wisconsin
- County: Kenosha
- Town: Wheatland

Area
  - Total: 1.18 sq mi (3.05 km^{2})
- Elevation: 794 ft (242 m)

Population (2020)
  - Total: 286
  - Density: 243/sq mi (93.8/km^{2})
- Time zone: UTC-6 (Central (CST))
  - Summer (DST): UTC-5 (CDT)
- ZIP Code: 53152
- Area code: 262
- GNIS feature ID: 1570228

New Munster is an unincorporated community and census-designated place in the town of Wheatland, in Kenosha County, Wisconsin, United States. The ZIP Code is 53152. It was named a CDP prior to the 2020 census, which showed a population of 286. A post office has been open in New Munster since 1880.

== Demographics ==
Historical population
Census	Pop.	Note	%±
2020	286		—
U.S. Decennial Census; 2020

=== 2020 census ===
New Munster CDP, Wisconsin – Racial and ethnic composition Note: the US Census treats Hispanic/Latino as an ethnic category. This table excludes Latinos from the racial categories and assigns them to a separate category. Hispanics/Latinos may be of any race.
Race / Ethnicity (NH = Non-Hispanic)	Pop 2020	2020
White alone (NH)	275	96.15%
Black or African American alone (NH)	0	0.00%
Native American or Alaska Native alone (NH)	0	0.00%
Asian alone (NH)	1	0.35%
Native Hawaiian or Pacific Islander alone (NH)	0	0.00%
Other race alone (NH)	0	0.00%
Mixed race or Multiracial (NH)	3	1.05%
Hispanic or Latino (any race)	7	2.45%
Total	286	100.00%
