= Pell Lake, Wisconsin =

- Former CDP
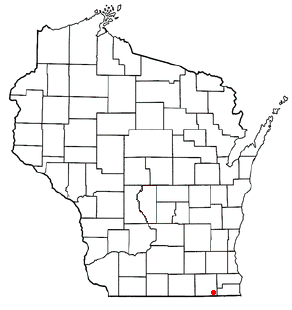
- Location of Pell Lake, Wisconsin
- Coordinates: 42°32′16″N 88°21′16″W
- Country: United States
- State: Wisconsin
- County: Walworth

Area
  - Total: 4.1 sq mi (10.6 km^{2})
  - Land: 3.9 sq mi (10.2 km^{2})
  - Water: 0.15 sq mi (0.4 km^{2})
- Elevation: 863 ft (263 m)

Population (2010)
  - Total: 3,722
  - Density: 945/sq mi (365/km^{2})
- Time zone: UTC-6 (Central (CST))
  - Summer (DST): UTC-5 (CDT)
- ZIP Code: 53157
- Area code: 262
- FIPS code: 55-61725
- GNIS feature ID: 1571158

Pell Lake is a neighborhood and former census-designated place (CDP) in Walworth County, Wisconsin, United States. The population was 3,722 at the 2010 census. On December 20, 2011, Pell Lake became part of the newly incorporated village of Bloomfield.

== Geography ==
Pell Lake is located at 42°32′16″N 88°21′16″W (42.537859, -88.354308).

According to the United States Census Bureau, the CDP has a total area of 4.1 square miles (10.6 km^{2}), of which 3.9 square miles (10.2 km^{2}) is land and 0.2 square mile (0.4 km^{2}) (3.92%) is water.

== Demographics ==
As of the census of 2000, there were 2,988 people, 1,135 households, and 769 families residing in the CDP. The population density was 762.0 people per square mile (294.3/km^{2}). There were 1,393 housing units at an average density of 355.3/sq mi (137.2/km^{2}). The racial makeup of the CDP was 97.79% White, 0.47% African American, 0.17% Native American, 0.30% Asian, 0.37% from other races, and 0.90% from two or more races. Hispanic or Latino of any race were 2.14% of the population.

There were 1,135 households, out of which 37.3% had children under the age of 18 living with them, 52.6% were married couples living together, 10.0% had a female householder with no husband present, and 32.2% were non-families. 26.0% of all households were made up of individuals, and 10.6% had someone living alone who was 65 years of age or older. The average household size was 2.62 and the average family size was 3.16.

In the CDP, the population was spread out, with 29.1% under the age of 18, 6.0% from 18 to 24, 34.3% from 25 to 44, 19.3% from 45 to 64, and 11.3% who were 65 years of age or older. The median age was 35 years. For every 100 females, there were 101.5 males. For every 100 females age 18 and over, there were 100.4 males.

The median income for a household in the CDP was $41,442, and the median income for a family was $41,711. Males had a median income of $37,917 versus $22,500 for females. The per capita income for the CDP was $16,380. About 8.9% of families and 10.5% of the population were below the poverty line, including 12.1% of those under age 18 and 12.1% of those age 65 or over.
