= Fannin, Mississippi =

Unincorporated community in the United States

- Unincorporated community
- Location within the state of Mississippi
- Coordinates: 32°25′02″N 89°57′24″W
- Country: United States
- State: Mississippi
- County: Rankin
- Elevation: 384 ft (117 m)
- Time zone: UTC-6 (Central (CST))
  - Summer (DST): UTC-5 (CDT)
- GNIS feature ID: 669910

Fannin is an unincorporated community in Rankin County, Mississippi, United States. Fannin is located approximately 15 miles (24 km) northeast of Jackson on Mississippi Highway 471.

== History ==
The first land grants in the Fannin area were given to settlers from the Carolinas in the 1830s. The community is purportedly named for a Revolutionary War soldier who lost his life in a house fire. By 1850, Fannin had a Methodist and Baptist church and was home to a junior college (the Rankin Masonic Institute). The school closed in 1925.

Fannin was located on the former Gulf, Mobile and Ohio Railroad and was once home to multiple general stores, grocery stores, and sawmill. In 1900, Fannin had a population of 150, two churches, and a school.

A post office operated under the name Fannin from 1860 to 1969.

First Baptist Church, Fannin was founded in 1848. The church's cemetery and chapel were designated as Mississippi Landmarks in 2022.

== Notable people ==
- Luther and Percy Huff, blues musicians
- Henry L. Whitfield, Governor of Mississippi from 1924 to 1927
