= Echola, Alabama =

- Unincorporated community
- Location within Alabama Location within the United States
- Coordinates: 33°20′41″N 87°47′22″W
- Country: United States
- State: Alabama
- County: Tuscaloosa
- Elevation: 285 ft (87 m)
- Time zone: UTC-6 (Central (CST))
  - Summer (DST): UTC-5 (CDT)
- ZIP code: 35457
- Area codes: 205, 659
- GNIS feature ID: 117845

Echola is an unincorporated community in Tuscaloosa County, Alabama, United States. Echola is 15.8 miles (25.4 km) northwest of Tuscaloosa. Echola has a post office with ZIP code 35457. Echola was previously known as Elbert. Due to possible confusion with Elberta, Alabama, the postmaster, Golden Mayfield, created the name Echola by combining "echo" and "Alabama".
