= Goshen Springs, Mississippi =

- Unincorporated community
- Location within the state of Mississippi
- Coordinates: 32°29′13″N 89°55′15″W
- Country: United States
- State: Mississippi
- County: Rankin
- Elevation: 420 ft (130 m)
- Time zone: UTC-6 (Central (CST))
  - Summer (DST): UTC-5 (CDT)
- ZIP code: 39047
- Area codes: 601 & 769
- GNIS feature ID: 691897

Goshen Springs (also New Goshen Springs) is an unincorporated community in Rankin County, Mississippi, United States.

== History ==
The settlement was founded around 1833.

Goshen Springs had a post office. The historic building has since been moved to a museum in Brandon.

Near Goshen Springs is the Armstrong Site, a prehistoric archeological settlement listed on the National Register of Historic Places.

Goshen Springs lies along a now-abandoned portion of the Illinois Central Railroad. The Rebel passenger train once passed through Goshen Springs each day.

In 1965, during the Civil Rights Movement, 31-year-old John Lee of Goshen Springs was found beaten to death on a county road. He had attended some civil rights meetings. His murder remains unsolved.

== Notable people ==
- Eugene Hoy Barksdale was a World War I pilot, and then test pilot for the US Air Force in the 1920s. He was killed on duty while bailing out of a test plane. Barksdale Air Force Base in Louisiana is named in his honor.
