= Robert S. Houston =

American politician (1820–1902)

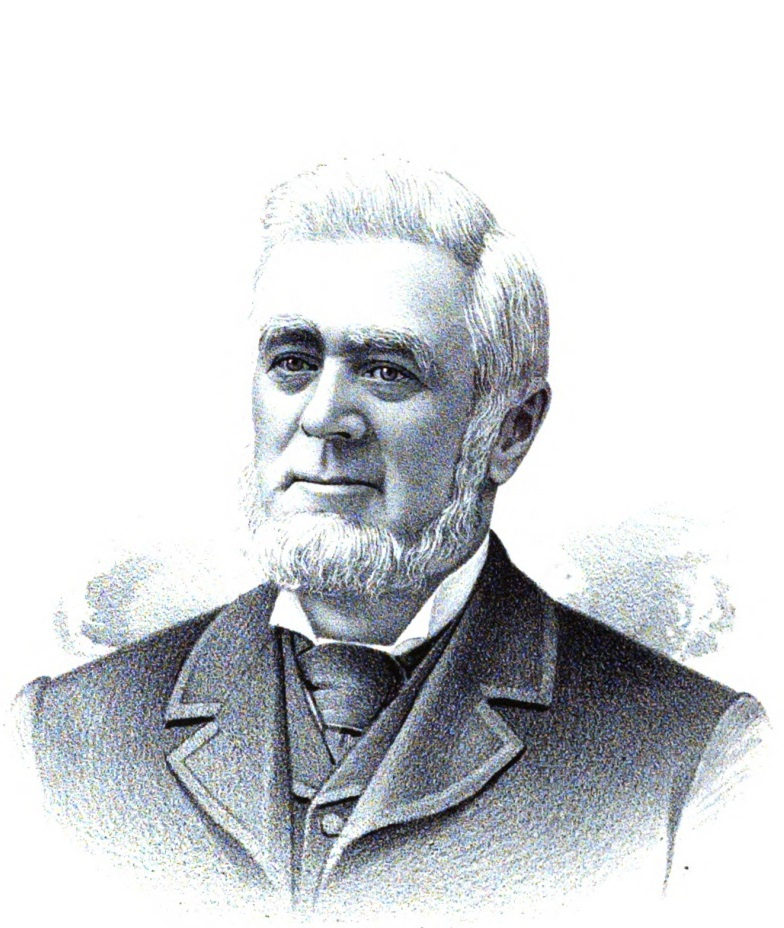
- From Portrait and Biographical Album of Racine and Kenosha Counties (1892)

Member of the Wisconsin State Assembly from the Kenosha County district
- In office January 5, 1891 – January 2, 1893
- Preceded by: Dwight L. Burgess
- Succeeded by: Daniel A. Mahoney
- In office January 5, 1874 – January 4, 1875
- Preceded by: Asahel Farr
- Succeeded by: Rouse Simmons

Personal details
- Born: August 7, 1820 Charlemont, Massachusetts, U.S.
- Died: January 5, 1902 (aged 81) Milwaukee, Wisconsin, U.S.
- Resting place: Green Ridge Cemetery, Kenosha, Wisconsin
- Party: Democratic
- Spouses: Lucy M. Smith (m. 1849; died 1894); Isabella Smith (m. 1894–1902)
- Children: 2 adopted daughters

Robert Samuel Houston (August 7, 1820 – January 5, 1902) was an American dairy farmer, Democratic politician, and Wisconsin pioneer. He was a member of the Wisconsin State Assembly, representing Kenosha County during the 1874 and 1891 terms.

== Biography ==
Houston was born in Charlemont, Massachusetts, on August 7, 1820. He received a common school education, and became a stonecutter. He worked for one employer in Meriden, Connecticut, from 1851 until moving to Wisconsin in September 1857, eventually settling on a farm in Pleasant Prairie, where he took up dairy farming, selling butter and cheese (winning medals with both); and raised hay, corn and oats.

Houston served as chairman of the town board for the town of Pleasant Prairie, and as treasurer of his local school district.

He was first elected to the Assembly in 1873 to represent Kenosha County as a member of the Liberal Reform Party. He drew 1,005 votes to 777 for Republican former state senator Francis Paddock (Republican incumbent Asahel Farr was not a candidate).

The Reform Party was a short-lived coalition of Democrats, reform and Liberal Republicans, and Grangers formed in 1873. The coalition won the election for Governor of Wisconsin and secured Democratic control of the Assembly for the first time since before the Civil War.

Serving in the 27th Wisconsin Legislature, he was assigned to the standing committee on railroads. This was an especially important committee during this legislative term, as railroad regulation was one of the key issues of the Reform coalition. Their signature legislation was the so-called "Potter Law" (1874 Wisc. Act 273), which implemented strict new regulations on railroad freight and passenger rates and created the office of Railroad Commissioner to enforce and administer the new regulations.

Houston did not seek re-election in 1874, and was succeeded by Republican Rouse Simmons. He ran again in 1876, but was defeated by Republican Walter Maxwell.

He was elected again to the Assembly in 1890 for a two-year term, this time as a Democrat, with 1,597 votes to 1,453 for Republican J. Cavanaugh (Republican incumbent Dwight Burgess was not a candidate). He was assigned to the committee on agriculture. He was succeeded by Democrat Daniel A. Mahoney.

In 1895, a complaint was made to the state veterinarian that Houston's cattle had been contaminated with tuberculosis. The state official came to Kenosha and, after testing, decided to slaughter 38 cows. Houston raised a complaint after learning that the carcasses of the cows had been taken and sold for beef. In the end, Houston was paid a small amount for his loss, but he continued his challenge and prepared a bill of damages, demanding full compensation. He attempted multiple lawsuits through the Wisconsin courts, failing at the circuit court and the Wisconsin Supreme Court. He personally lobbied the governor, Edward Scofield, and the Legislature, but was still unsuccessful. The legal fight cost most of what remained of his fortune.

== Personal life and family ==
Robert S. Houston was the third of six children born to David Houston and his wife Therza (née Upton). His paternal grandfather, John Houston, served in the New Hampshire militia during the American Revolutionary War.

Robert Houston married twice. He first married widow Lucy M. Stone (née Smith) of Whately, Massachusetts, on January 24, 1849. She died in 1894, and Houston subsequently married Isabella Smith, a niece of his first wife. He had two adopted daughters.

He died of edema in Milwaukee on January 5, 1902.

== Electoral history ==
=== Wisconsin Assembly (1873) ===
Wisconsin Assembly, Kenosha District Election, 1873
Party	Candidate	Votes	%	±%
General Election, November 4, 1873
Reform	Robert S. Houston	1,005	56.40%	
Republican	Francis Paddock	777	43.60%	−9.07%
Plurality		228	12.79%	+7.45%
Total votes		1,782	100.0%	-32.47%
Reform gain from Republican				

=== Wisconsin Assembly (1876) ===
Wisconsin Assembly, Kenosha District Election, 1876
Party	Candidate	Votes	%	±%
General Election, November 7, 1876
Republican	Walter S. Maxwell	1,672	54.96%	+8.96%
Democratic	Robert S. Houston	1,374	45.04%	
Plurality		302	9.93%	
Total votes		3,042	100.0%	+36.66%
Republican gain from Democratic				

=== Wisconsin Assembly (1890) ===
Wisconsin Assembly, Kenosha District Election, 1890
Party	Candidate	Votes	%	±%
General Election, November 4, 1890
Democratic	Robert S. Houston	1,597	52.36%	+4.84%
Republican	J. Cavanaugh	1,453	47.64%	−2.27%
Plurality		144	4.72%	+2.33%
Total votes		3,050	100.0%	-12.00%
Democratic hold				

Wisconsin State Assembly
Preceded by Asahel Farr	Member of the Wisconsin State Assembly from the Kenosha County district January 5, 1874 – January 4, 1875	Succeeded by Rouse Simmons
Preceded by Dwight L. Burgess	Member of the Wisconsin State Assembly from the Kenosha County district January 5, 1891 – January 2, 1893	Succeeded by Daniel A. Mahoney
