= Kenosha County Library System =

Public library system in Wisconsin, United States

Kenosha County Library System (KCLS)
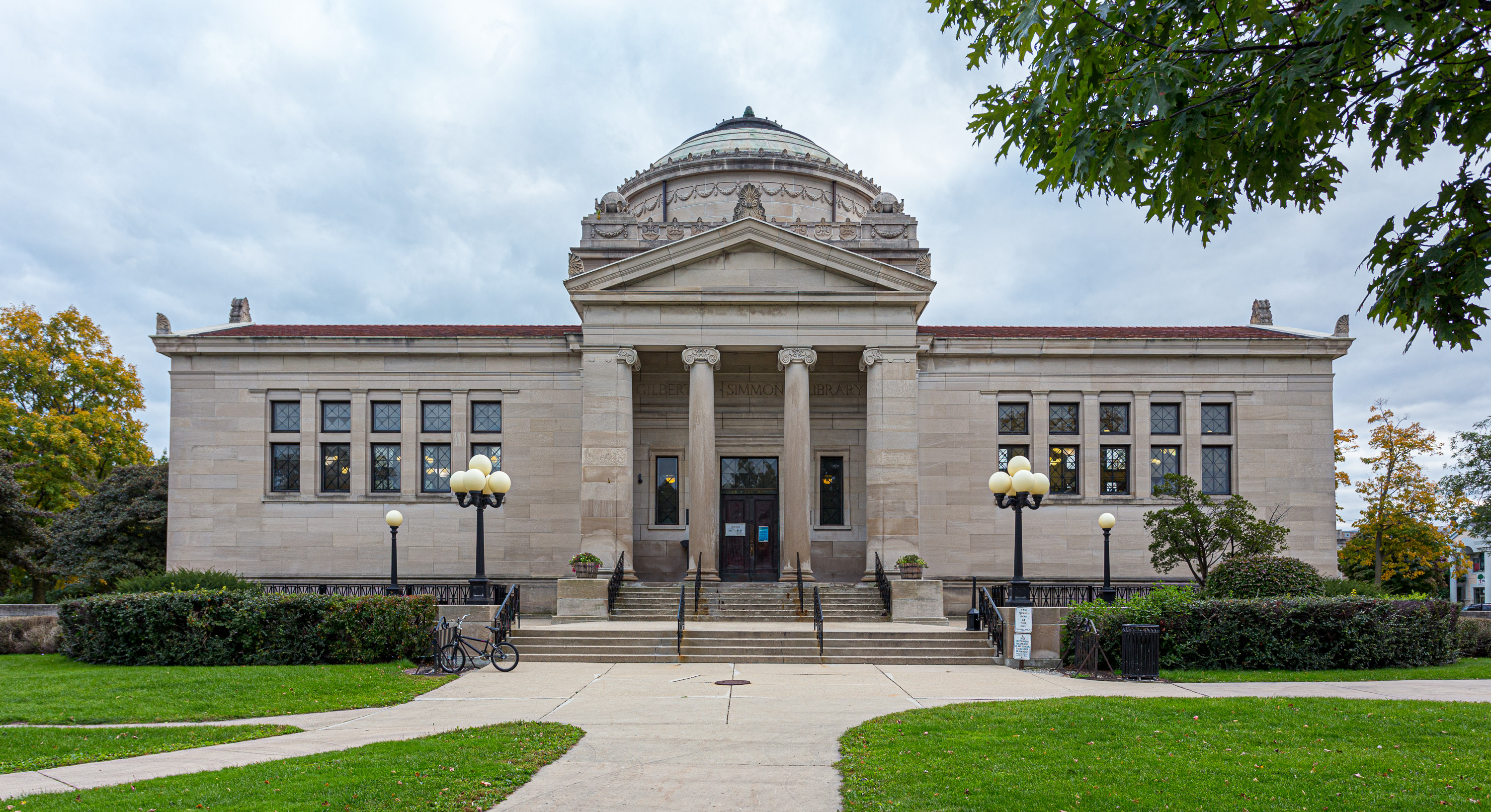
- Gilbert M. Simmons Memorial Library
- 42.5593329°N 87.8532048°W
- Location: Kenosha County, Wisconsin, United States
- Type: Public library system
- Established: January 1, 1981
- Branches: 7 (5 KPL, 2 Community Library)

Access and use
- Circulation: 771,880 (2022, physical)
- Population served: 170,267 (2022)
- Members: Kenosha Public Library (KPL); Community Library

Other information
- Director: Sarah Townsend
- Website: www.mykcls.info

The Kenosha County Library System (KCLS) is the southeastern-most of 15 public library systems in Wisconsin, serving Kenosha County. Along with the Milwaukee County Federated Library System (MCFLS), it is one of only two single-county public library organizations in the state.

The KCLS has two members, the Kenosha Public Library (KPL) serving the city of Kenosha, and the Community Library, which serves the town of Randall and the villages of Paddock Lake, Salem Lakes, and Twin Lakes.

== Members ==
The Kenosha Public Library (KPL) serves the city of Kenosha, and is the resource library for the KCLS. The library has an Outreach department and five branches:

- Simmons Neighborhood Library (1900)
- Uptown Neighborhood Library (1925)
- Southwest Neighborhood Library (1981, rebuilt 2004). The KCLS main resource library.
- Northside Neighborhood Library (1993)
- Kids@Uptown Lofts (2024)

The library offers audiobook, e-book, and eMagazine services, including OverDrive eBooks & eAudiobooks, TeachingBooks Library, Ebsco eBooks, and Online tutoring, delivered via the library's website.

Community Library
- Location: Kenosha County, Wisconsin, United States
- Type: Public library system
- Established: February 1, 1977
- Branches: 2

Access and use
- Circulation: 159,629 (2022, physical)
- Population served: 32,517 (2022)

Other information
- Director: LeeAnn LoCicero
- Website: www.communitylib.org

The Community Library is the area library for Kenosha County communities outside the city of Kenosha. It has two branches, one in Salem Lakes and another in Twin Lakes.
