= Salem, Wisconsin =

Salem, Wisconsin may refer to:

- Salem (community), Kenosha County, Wisconsin, an unincorporated community
- Salem, Pierce County, Wisconsin, a town in Pierce County
- Salem (community), Pierce County, Wisconsin, an unincorporated community in Pierce County

== See also ==
- Salem Lakes, Wisconsin, a village in Kenosha County, formerly the town of Salem
- Salem Oaks, Wisconsin, an unincorporated community in Kenosha County
