= John F. Reynolds (politician) =

American politician (1852-1934)

Member of the Wisconsin Senate from the 3rd district
- In office January 2, 1899 – January 5, 1903
- Preceded by: Ernst Timme
- Succeeded by: Otis Wells Johnson

Member of the Wisconsin State Assembly from the Kenosha County district
- In office January 7, 1895 – January 2, 1899
- Preceded by: George H. Kroncke
- Succeeded by: S. Dwight Slade

Personal details
- Born: July 25, 1852 Randall, Wisconsin, U.S.
- Died: June 30, 1934 (aged 81) Pontiac, Illinois, U.S.
- Resting place: South Side Cemetery, Pontiac, Illinois
- Party: Republican
- Spouse: Caroline M. Slade (died 1937)
- Children: Clarence F. Reynolds; (b. 1883; died 1924)
- Education: Platteville Normal School
- Occupation: Farmer

John F. Reynolds (July 25, 1852 – June 20, 1934) was an American farmer and Republican politician. He was a member of the Wisconsin State Senate (1899–1902) and State Assembly (1895–1898), representing Kenosha County.

== Biography ==
Reynolds was born on July 25, 1852, in Randall, Wisconsin. His education included attending what is now the University of Wisconsin-Platteville. Reynolds was a farmer by trade.

== Political career ==
Reynolds was elected to the Assembly in 1894 and 1896. He was a member of the Senate during the 1899 and 1901 sessions representing the 3rd District. Additionally, Reynolds was Chairman (similar to Mayor) of Randall. He was a Republican.

Reynolds died June 20, 1934, and was interred in Pontiac, Illinois.

Wisconsin State Assembly
Preceded by George H. Kroncke	Member of the Wisconsin State Assembly from the Kenosha County district January 7, 1895 – January 2, 1899	Succeeded by S. Dwight Slade
Wisconsin Senate
Preceded by Ernst Timme	Member of the Wisconsin Senate from the 3rd district January 2, 1899 – January 5, 1903	Succeeded by Otis Wells Johnson
