= Montgomery Lake =

Montgomery Lake may refer to the following lakes:

- Montgomery Lake (Sudbury District), Ontario
- Montgomery Lake (Renfrew County), Ontario
- Montgomery Lake (Cochrane District), Ontario
- Montgomery Lake (Rainy River District), Ontario
- Montgomery Lake (Muskoka District), Ontario
- Montgomery Lake (Florence County, Wisconsin)
- Montgomery Lake (Kenosha County, Wisconsin)
- Montgomery Lake in Crawford County, Arkansas
- Montgomery Lake in Faulkner County, Arkansas
- Montgomery Lake, Pulaski County, Arkansas

== See also ==
- Montgomery (disambiguation)
