= Salem Oaks, Wisconsin =

- Community
- Location within Wisconsin Location within the United States
- Coordinates: 42°33′31″N 88°05′32″W
- Country: United States
- State: Wisconsin
- County: Kenosha
- Village: Salem Lakes
- Elevation: 774 ft (236 m)
- Time zone: UTC-6 (Central (CST))
  - Summer (DST): UTC-5 (CDT)
- Zip: 53169
- Area code: 262
- GNIS feature ID: 1573629

Salem Oaks is a subdivision centered at 84th Street and 235th Avenue just south of the village of Paddock Lake in the village of Salem Lakes in south-central Kenosha County, Wisconsin, United States, adjoining Montgomery Lake and Hooker Lake.
