= Voltz Lake, Wisconsin =

- Neighborhood
- Location within Wisconsin Location within the United States
- Coordinates: 42°30′26″N 88°05′09″W
- Country: United States
- State: Wisconsin
- County: Kenosha
- Village: Salem Lakes
- Time zone: UTC-6 (Central (CST))
  - Summer (DST): UTC-5 (CDT)
- Area code: 262

Voltz Lake is a residential and resort community within the village of Salem Lakes in south-central Kenosha County, Wisconsin, United States. The body of water, Voltz Lake, is located at 42°30′28″N 88°5′2″W.
