= Paris, Kenosha County, Wisconsin =

Town of Paris, Wisconsin
- Town
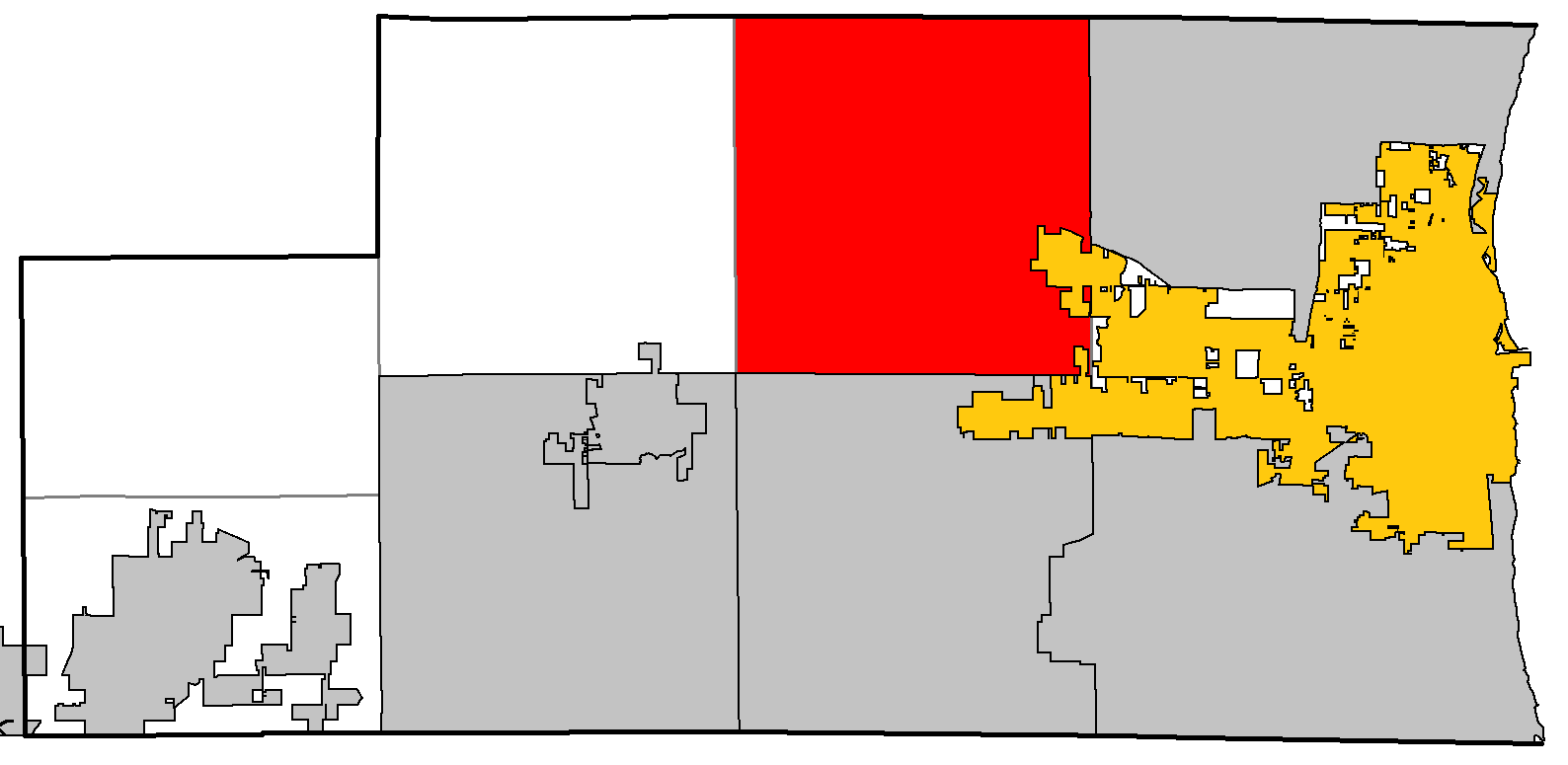
- Location of the Town of Paris, within Kenosha County
- Coordinates: 42°37′1″N 88°0′47″W
- Country: United States
- State: Wisconsin
- County: Kenosha

Area
  - Total: 35.9 sq mi (93.1 km^{2})
  - Land: 35.9 sq mi (93.1 km^{2})
  - Water: 0 sq mi (0.0 km^{2})
- Elevation: 784 ft (239 m)

Population (2020)
  - Total: 1,397
  - Density: 42/sq mi (16.2/km^{2})
- Time zone: UTC-6 (Central (CST))
  - Summer (DST): UTC-5 (CDT)
- Area code: 262
- FIPS code: 55-61175
- GNIS feature ID: 1583894
- Website: www.townofparis.org

Paris is a town in Kenosha County, Wisconsin, United States. The population was 1,397 at the 2020 census. The unincorporated communities of Chapin and Paris are located within the town.

== History ==
Seth B. Myrick was the first settler in Paris, arriving from Paris, New York, on July 10, 1837. Later arrivals allowed Myrick the privilege of naming the community, and he chose the name of his original home community. On his monument stone is inscribed: "He was the first settler in this town and named it Paris."

St. John the Baptist Catholic Church celebrated its 150th anniversary in 2009.

== Geography ==
According to the United States Census Bureau, the town has a total area of 35.9 square miles (93.1 km^{2}), all land.

== Demographics ==
Historical population
Census	Pop.	Note	%±
2000	1,473		—
2010	1,504		2.1%
2020	1,397		−7.1%
U.S. Decennial Census

=== 2020 census ===
Paris town, Kenosha County, Wisconsin – Racial and ethnic composition Note: the US Census treats Hispanic/Latino as an ethnic category. This table excludes Latinos from the racial categories and assigns them to a separate category. Hispanics/Latinos may be of any race.
Race / Ethnicity (NH = Non-Hispanic)	Pop 2000	Pop 2010	Pop 2020	% 2000	% 2010	% 2020
White alone (NH)	1,430	1,451	1,284	97.08%	96.48%	91.91%
Black or African American alone (NH)	4	2	4	0.27%	0.13%	0.29%
Native American or Alaska Native alone (NH)	2	5	3	0.14%	0.33%	0.21%
Asian alone (NH)	4	7	2	0.27%	0.47%	0.14%
Native Hawaiian or Pacific Islander alone (NH)	0	0	0	0.00%	0.00%	0.00%
Other race alone (NH)	5	0	0	0.34%	0.00%	0.00%
Mixed race or Multiracial (NH)	8	5	24	0.54%	0.33%	1.72%
Hispanic or Latino (any race)	20	34	80	1.36%	2.26%	5.73%
Total	1,473	1,504	1,397	100.00%	100.00%	100.00%

=== 2000 census ===
As of the census of 2000, there were 1,473 people, 535 households, and 434 families residing in the town. The population density was 40.4 inhabitants per square mile (15.6/km^{2}). There were 554 housing units at an average density of 15.2 per square mile (5.9/km^{2}). The racial makeup of the town was 97.90% White, 0.27% African American, 0.14% Native American, 0.27% Asian, 0.54% from other races, and 0.88% from two or more races. Hispanic or Latino of any race were 1.36% of the population.

There were 535 households, out of which 32.7% had children under the age of 18 living with them, 68.8% were married couples living together, 8.6% had a female householder with no husband present, and 18.7% were non-families. 15.1% of all households were made up of individuals, and 4.1% had someone living alone who was 65 years of age or older. The average household size was 2.75 and the average family size was 3.03.

In the town, the population was spread out, with 24.9% under the age of 18, 5.6% from 18 to 24, 29.8% from 25 to 44, 25.7% from 45 to 64, and 14.1% who were 65 years of age or older. The median age was 40 years. For every 100 females, there were 98.8 males. For every 100 females age 18 and over, there were 102.6 males.

The median income for a household in the town was $54,375, and the median income for a family was $60,089. Males had a median income of $40,093 versus $27,750 for females. The per capita income for the town was $23,458. About 3.8% of families and 3.6% of the population were below the poverty line, including 5.7% of those under age 18 and 2.8% of those age 65 or over.

== Notable people ==
- Dwight L. Burgess, farmer and politician, lived in the town
- C. Ernest Dewey, businessman and politician, was born on a farm in the town
