= C. Ernest Dewey =

American businessman and politician

C. Ernest Dewey (March 21, 1861 – February 14, 1945) was an American businessman and politician.

Born on a farm in the town of Paris, Kenosha County, Wisconsin, Dewey graduated from Kenosha High School in Kenosha, Wisconsin and then was involved with his family business the Dewey Hardware Company. He was also involved with Wisconsin Retail Hardware Association. In 1929, Dewey served in the Wisconsin State Assembly and was a Republican. Dewey died in a hospital in Kenosha, Wisconsin.
