= Chapin, Wisconsin =

- Unincorporated community
- Location within Wisconsin Location within the United States
- Coordinates: 42°37′17″N 87°58′22″W
- Country: United States
- State: Wisconsin
- County: Kenosha
- Town: Paris
- Time zone: UTC-6 (Central (CST))
  - Summer (DST): UTC-5 (CDT)
- Area code: 262

Chapin is a small residential and agricultural unincorporated community in the town of Paris, Kenosha County, Wisconsin, United States. It is centered at Highway 142 (Burlington Road) near what is currently Kenosha County Highway MB. The community was settled in the 19th century and has also been known as Star Corners, Heidersdorf's Corner, Jugville (it was the site of the area's first tavern), and Parisville.
