= Trevor, Wisconsin =

- Community
- Location within Wisconsin Location within the United States
- Coordinates: 42°30′45″N 88°07′15″W
- Country: United States
- State: Wisconsin
- County: Kenosha
- Village: Salem Lakes
- Elevation: 787 ft (240 m)
- Time zone: UTC-6 (Central (CST))
  - Summer (DST): UTC-5 (CDT)
- ZIP code: 53179
- Area code: 262
- GNIS feature ID: 1575601

Trevor is a community in the village of Salem Lakes in Kenosha County, Wisconsin, United States. Trevor is south of Paddock Lake. Trevor has a post office with ZIP code 53179.

== Notable people ==
- Walker M. Curtiss, farmer and legislator
