= Salem Lakes, Wisconsin =

- Village
- Motto: "Pro Deo et Patria", meaning "For God and Country".
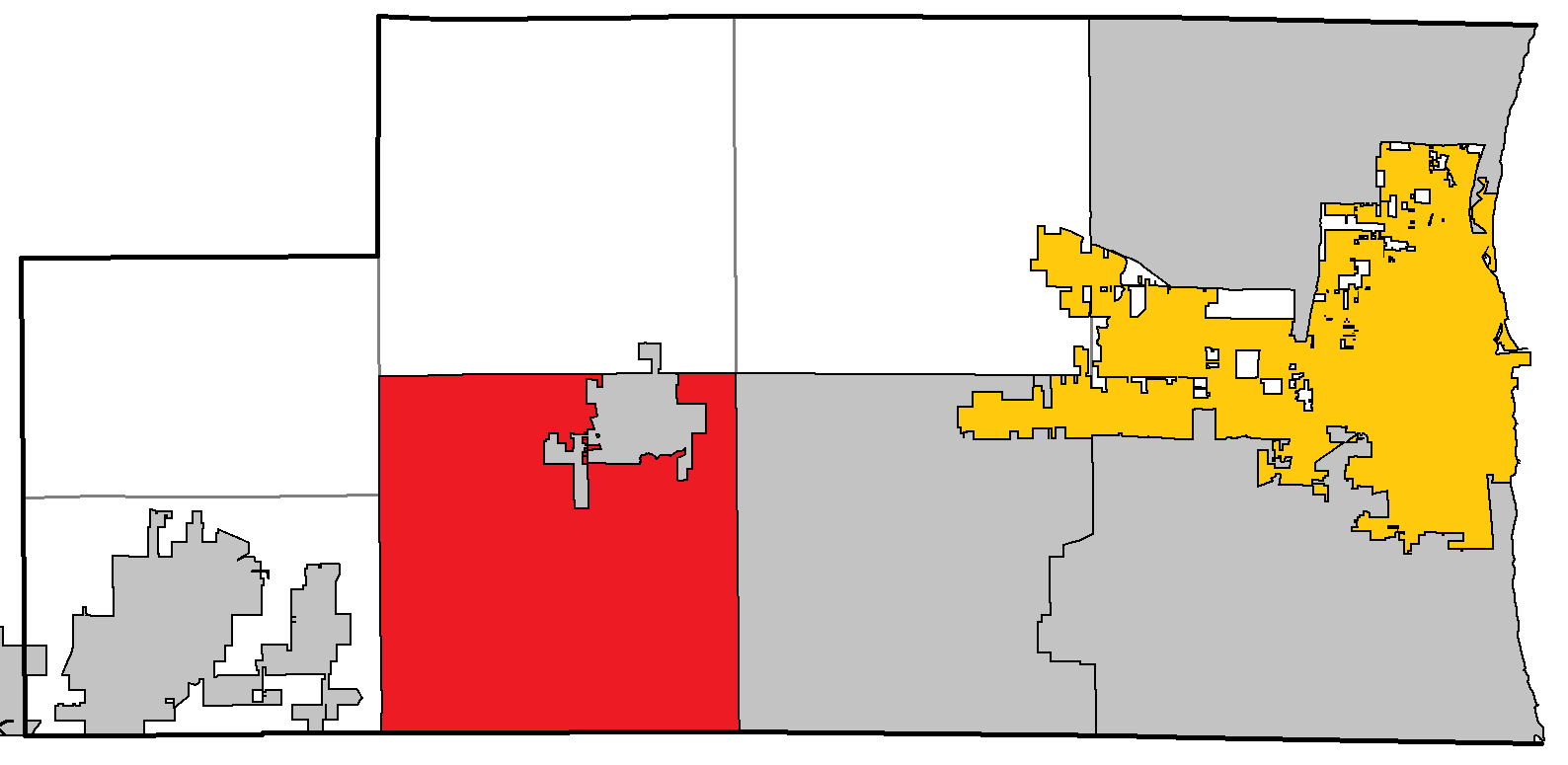
- Location of Salem Lakes, Wisconsin
- Coordinates: 42°31′33″N 88°7′51″W
- Country: United States
- State: Wisconsin
- County: Kenosha

Area
  - Total: 33.29 sq mi (86.22 km^{2})
  - Land: 30.48 sq mi (78.95 km^{2})
  - Water: 2.81 sq mi (7.27 km^{2})
- Elevation: 741 ft (226 m)

Population (2020)
  - Total: 14,601
  - Density: 487.2/sq mi (188.12/km^{2})
- Time zone: UTC-6 (Central (CST))
  - Summer (DST): UTC-5 (CDT)
- Area code: 262
- FIPS code: 55-71125
- GNIS feature ID: 1584093
- Website: voslwi.gov

Salem Lakes, formerly the town of Salem and the village of Silver Lake, is a village in Kenosha County, Wisconsin, United States. The village was created by a municipal merger on February 14, 2017. The population was 14,601 at the 2020 census. The communities of Benet Lake, Camp Lake, Cross Lake, Fox River, Lake Shangrila, Liberty Corners, Salem, Salem Oaks, Silver Lake, Trevor, Voltz Lake, and Wilmot are wholly or partially located in the village.

== History ==
In June 1837, John Dodge became the first settler in Salem proper. Shortly thereafter, General Bullen and David Bullen settled on the east bank of the Fox River and surveyed and platted a village, hoping to make Salem a main head of Fox River navigation. A bridge spanning the river was called "Bullen's Bridge".

On February 14, 2017, Salem Lakes became a village, which included the village of Silver Lake, as well as the communities of Trevor, Wilmot, and Camp Lake.

== Geography ==
According to the United States Census Bureau, the town in 2010 had a total area of 32.4 square miles (83.9 km^{2}), of which 29.7 square miles (76.9 km^{2}) were land and 2.7 square miles (7.0 km^{2}, or 8.34%) were water.

== Demographics ==
Historical population
Census	Pop.	Note	%±
2020	14,601		—
U.S. Decennial Census

=== 2020 census ===
As of the 2020 census, Salem Lakes had a population of 14,601. The median age was 41.8 years. 22.6% of residents were under the age of 18 and 14.5% were 65 years of age or older. For every 100 females, there were 101.8 males; for every 100 females age 18 and over, there were 101.0 males age 18 and over.

75.6% of residents lived in urban areas and 24.4% lived in rural areas.

There were 5,648 households, of which 31.8% had children under the age of 18 living in them. Of all households, 54.6% were married-couple households, 17.0% were households with a male householder and no spouse or partner present, and 19.9% were households with a female householder and no spouse or partner present. About 22.7% of all households were made up of individuals, and 9.1% had someone living alone who was 65 years of age or older.

There were 6,319 housing units, of which 10.6% were vacant. The homeowner vacancy rate was 1.3% and the rental vacancy rate was 4.2%.

Salem Lakes village, Wisconsin – Racial and ethnic composition Note: the US Census treats Hispanic/Latino as an ethnic category. This table excludes Latinos from the racial categories and assigns them to a separate category. Hispanics/Latinos may be of any race.
Race / Ethnicity (NH = Non-Hispanic)	Pop 2020	2020
White alone (NH)	12,884	88.24%
Black or African American alone (NH)	78	0.53%
Native American or Alaska Native alone (NH)	35	0.24%
Asian alone (NH)	87	0.60%
Native Hawaiian or Pacific Islander alone (NH)	7	0.05%
Other race alone (NH)	45	0.31%
Mixed race or Multiracial (NH)	600	4.11%
Hispanic or Latino (any race)	865	5.92%
Total	14,601	100.00%

=== 2000 census ===
As of the 2000 United States census, there were 9,871 people, 3,529 households, and 2,653 families residing in the town. This census occurred before the merger of the village of Silver Lake, and does not include the data from that area. The population density was 332.5 inhabitants per square mile (128.4/km^{2}). There were 3,939 housing units at an average density of 132.7 per square mile (51.2/km^{2}). The racial makeup of the town was 97.33% White, 0.53% African American, 0.32% Native American, 0.30% Asian, 0.02% Pacific Islander, 0.80% from other races, and 0.70% from two or more races. Hispanic or Latino of any race were 2.51% of the population.

There were 3,529 households, out of which 40.2% had children under the age of 18 living with them, 61.9% were married couples living together, 9.0% had a female householder with no husband present, and 24.8% were non-families. 18.8% of all households were made up of individuals, and 5.2% had someone living alone who was 65 years of age or older. The average household size was 2.79 and the average family size was 3.21.

In the town, the population was spread out, with 29.6% under the age of 18, 6.8% from 18 to 24, 34.6% from 25 to 44, 20.8% from 45 to 64, and 8.2% who were 65 years of age or older. The median age was 35 years. For every 100 females, there were 102.9 males. For every 100 females age 18 and over, there were 99.8 males.

The median income for a household in the town was $54,392, and the median income for a family was $60,032. Males had a median income of $41,458 versus $28,438 for females. The per capita income for the town was $22,814. About 5.2% of families and 6.8% of the population were below the poverty line, including 7.7% of those under age 18 and 4.0% of those age 65 or over.

== Education ==
K-8 schools serving portions of Salem Lakes include:

- Salem Elementary School - eastern half including the communities of Salem and Lake Shangrila
- Riverview Joint School District - serving portions of Silver Lake and Camp Lake
- Trevor-Wilmot Consolidated - serving the southwestern portion of Salem Lakes, including Trevor, Wilmot, Benet Lake, and portions of Camp Lake
- Wheatland Center Joint School - located in adjacent Wheatland and serving a small rural portion of northwestern Salem Lakes

High schools serving Salem Lakes include:

- Westosha Central High School is located adjacent to village borders in neighboring Paddock Lake and serves the eastern half of the village, as well as surrounding communities.
- Wilmot High School is located in the Salem Lakes community of Wilmot, serving the western half of Salem Lakes as well as neighboring Twin Lakes.

Along with the rest of the county, Salem Lakes is part of the Gateway Technical College district, with the nearest campus to the village being in Kenosha, as well as additional program-specific centers nearby in Kenosha and Burlington. The nearest university, University of Wisconsin-Parkside, spans the border of Kenosha and Somers to the northeast of the village.

Salem Lakes, Randall, Twin Lakes, and Paddock Lake are served by the Community Library District, which is a part of the Kenosha County Library System.

== Notable people ==
- Alex Davison Bailey, mechanical engineer
- Walker M. Curtiss, farmer and legislator
- Daniel A. Mahoney, lawyer and legislator
- Francis Paddock, physician and legislator
- George M. Robinson, pioneer and legislator
- Matt G. Siebert, legislator
