= Walker M. Curtiss =

American politician

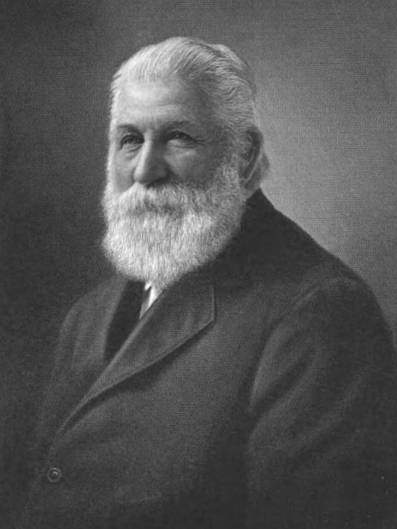

Member of the Wisconsin State Assembly
- In office 1904–1912
- Constituency: Kenosha County, Wisconsin

Personal details
- Born: November 1, 1852 Salem, Kenosha County, Wisconsin
- Died: January 18, 1917 (aged 64) Trevor, Wisconsin
- Party: Republican
- Education: Beloit College
- Occupation: Farmer, politician

Walker M. Curtiss (November 1, 1852 – January 18, 1917) was an American farmer and politician.

Born in the town of Salem, Kenosha County, Wisconsin, Curtiss lived in the community of Trevor, Wisconsin, graduated from Beloit College, and was a farmer. He served in several public offices. Curtiss was a member of the Wisconsin State Assembly from 1905 to 1911 and was a Republican. Curtiss died at his home in Trevor, Wisconsin.
