= Salem (community), Kenosha County, Wisconsin =

Salem, Wisconsin
- Community
- Location within Wisconsin Location within the United States
- Coordinates: 42°33′17″N 88°06′39″W
- Country: United States
- State: Wisconsin
- County: Kenosha
- Village: Salem Lakes
- Elevation: 778 ft (237 m)
- Time zone: UTC-6 (Central (CST))
  - Summer (DST): UTC-5 (CDT)
- ZIP code: 53168, 53196
- Area code: 262
- GNIS feature ID: 1573609

Salem (also Brooklyn) is a community in the village of Salem Lakes, Kenosha County, Wisconsin, United States. The community is located on Wisconsin Highway 83, 1.5 miles (2.4 km) south of Paddock Lake. Salem has a post office with ZIP code 53168.
