= Silver Lake, Wisconsin =

- Neighborhood of Salem Lakes; Former village
- Location of Silver Lake in Kenosha County, Wisconsin
- Coordinates: 42°32′58″N 88°10′9″W
- Country: United States
- State: Wisconsin
- County: Kenosha
- Village: Salem Lakes
- Incorporated: August 27, 1926
- Merged: February 14, 2017

Area
  - Total: 1.35 sq mi (3.50 km^{2})
  - Land: 1.35 sq mi (3.50 km^{2})
  - Water: 0 sq mi (0 km^{2})
- Elevation: 750 ft (230 m)

Population (2010)
  - Total: 2,411
  - Density: 1,786/sq mi (689.5/km^{2})
- Time zone: UTC-6 (Central (CST))
  - Summer (DST): UTC-5 (CDT)
- ZIP code: 53170
- Area code: 262
- FIPS code: 55-74025
- GNIS feature ID: 1574150

Silver Lake is a former village and now a neighborhood within the village of Salem Lakes in Kenosha County, Wisconsin, United States. The population was 2,411 at the 2010 census, when the community was still an independent village. On February 14, 2017, the village merged with the town of Salem to create the village of Salem Lakes.

== Geography ==
Silver Lake is located at 42°32′58″N 88°10′9″W (42.549485, -88.169194).

According to the United States Census Bureau, the village has a total area of 1.35 square miles (3.50 km^{2}), all land.

== Demographics ==
Historical population
Census	Pop.	Note	%±
1930	356		—
1940	365		2.5%
1950	603		65.2%
1960	1,077		78.6%
1970	1,210		12.3%
1980	1,598		32.1%
1990	1,801		12.7%
2000	2,341		30.0%
2010	2,411		3.0%
2018 (est.)	2,566		6.4%
U.S. Decennial Census

=== 2010 census ===
Silver Lake village, Wisconsin – Racial and ethnic composition Note: the US Census treats Hispanic/Latino as an ethnic category. This table excludes Latinos from the racial categories and assigns them to a separate category. Hispanics/Latinos may be of any race.
Race / Ethnicity (NH = Non-Hispanic)	Pop 2000	Pop 2010	% 2000	% 2010
White alone (NH)	2,231	2,258	95.30%	93.65%
Black or African American alone (NH)	2	13	0.09%	0.54%
Native American or Alaska Native alone (NH)	12	6	0.51%	0.25%
Asian alone (NH)	4	2	0.17%	0.08%
Native Hawaiian or Pacific Islander alone (NH)	0	2	0.00%	0.08%
Other race alone (NH)	0	0	0.00%	0.00%
Mixed race or Multiracial (NH)	20	28	0.85%	1.16%
Hispanic or Latino (any race)	72	102	3.08%	4.23%
Total	2,341	2,411	100.00%	100.00%

As of the census of 2010, there were 2,411 people, 908 households, and 629 families living in the village. The population density was 1,785.9 inhabitants per square mile (689.5/km^{2}). There were 1,072 housing units at an average density of 794.1 per square mile (306.6/km^{2}). The racial makeup of the village was 96.1% White, 0.5% African American, 0.2% Native American, 0.1% Asian, 0.1% Pacific Islander, 1.4% from other races, and 1.5% from two or more races. Hispanic or Latino of any race were 4.2% of the population.

There were 908 households, of which 38.5% had children under the age of 18 living with them, 52.4% were married couples living together, 11.0% had a female householder with no husband present, 5.8% had a male householder with no wife present, and 30.7% were non-families. 24.8% of all households were made up of individuals, and 8.6% had someone living alone who was 65 years of age or older. The average household size was 2.65 and the average family size was 3.18.

The median age in the village was 36.8 years. 27.7% of residents were under the age of 18; 7.5% were between the ages of 18 and 24; 25.8% were from 25 to 44; 29.1% were from 45 to 64; and 9.9% were 65 years of age or older. The gender makeup of the village was 51.3% male and 48.7% female.

=== 2000 census ===
At the 2000 census, there were 2,341 people, 876 households and 613 families living in the village. The population density was 1,532.4 inhabitants per square mile (591.7/km^{2}). There were 964 housing units at an average density of 631.0 per square mile (243.6/km^{2}). The racial makeup of the village was 96.88% White, 0.09% African American, 0.56% Native American, 0.17% Asian, 0.81% from other races, and 1.50% from two or more races. Hispanic or Latino of any race were 3.08% of the population.

There were 876 households, of which 40.1% had children under the age of 18 living with them, 54.0% were married couples living together, 11.3% had a female householder with no husband present, and 30.0% were non-families. 23.9% of all households were made up of individuals, and 9.4% had someone living alone who was 65 years of age or older. The average household size was 2.67 and the average family size was 3.21.

30.5% of the population were under the age of 18, 6.1% from 18 to 24, 32.5% from 25 to 44, 20.8% from 45 to 64, and 10.1% who were 65 years of age or older. The median age was 35 years. For every 100 females, there were 100.8 males. For every 100 females age 18 and over, there were 95.1 males.

The median household income was $50,431 and the median family income was $59,844. Males had a median income of $43,879 versus $26,719 for females. The per capita income for the village was $20,757. About 2.4% of families and 4.9% of the population were below the poverty line, including 4.2% of those under age 18 and 10.0% of those age 65 or over.
