= Lake Shangrila, Wisconsin =

- Former CDP
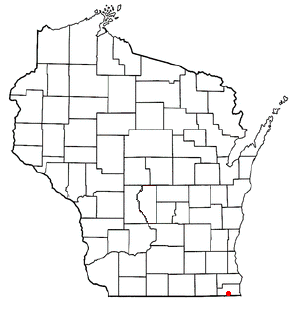
- Location of Lake Shangrila, Wisconsin
- Coordinates: 42°30′23″N 88°4′21″W
- Country: United States
- State: Wisconsin
- County: Kenosha

Area
  - Total: 0.97 sq mi (2.5 km^{2})
  - Land: 0.73 sq mi (1.9 km^{2})
  - Water: 0.23 sq mi (0.6 km^{2})
- Elevation: 817 ft (249 m)

Population (2010)
  - Total: 861
  - Density: 1,200/sq mi (450/km^{2})
- Time zone: UTC-6 (Central (CST))
  - Summer (DST): UTC-5 (CDT)
- Area code: 262
- FIPS code: 55-41770
- GNIS feature ID: 1877175

Lake Shangrila was a census-designated place (CDP) in the town of Salem Lakes, Kenosha County, Wisconsin, United States. The population was 861 at the 2010 census. The core area of the CDP was annexed into the village of Bristol on March 15, 2011, at the same time that the CDP was deleted.

== Geography ==
Lake Shangrila is located at 42°30′23″N 88°4′21″W (42.506274, -88.072471).

According to the United States Census Bureau, the CDP has a total area of 1.0 square miles (2.5 km^{2}), of which 0.7 square mile (1.9 km^{2}) is land and 0.2 square mile (0.6 km^{2}) (24.74%) is water.

== Demographics ==
Historical population
Census	Pop.	Note	%±
2000	805		—
2010	861		7.0%
U.S. Decennial Census

As of the census of 2000, there were 805 people, 299 households, and 214 families residing in the CDP. The population density was 1,108.4 inhabitants per square mile (428.0/km^{2}). There were 363 housing units at an average density of 499.8 per square mile (193.0/km^{2}). The racial makeup of the CDP was 97.14% White, 1.12% African American, 0.25% Asian, 1.12% from other races, and 0.37% from two or more races. Hispanic or Latino of any race were 1.99% of the population.

There were 299 households, out of which 31.4% had children under the age of 18 living with them, 57.5% were married couples living together, 10.4% had a female householder with no husband present, and 28.1% were non-families. 21.7% of all households were made up of individuals, and 8.0% had someone living alone who was 65 years of age or older. The average household size was 2.61 and the average family size was 3.06.

In the CDP, the population was spread out, with 26.3% under the age of 18, 5.6% from 18 to 24, 31.3% from 25 to 44, 24.8% from 45 to 64, and 11.9% who were 65 years of age or older. The median age was 38 years. For every 100 females, there were 107.5 males. For every 100 females age 18 and over, there were 103.8 males.

The median income for a household in the CDP was $65,977, and the median income for a family was $67,070. Males had a median income of $47,083 versus $35,972 for females. The per capita income for the CDP was $24,606. About 5.2% of families and 7.5% of the population were below the poverty line, including 2.9% of those under age 18 and none of those age 65 or over.
