= Fox River, Wisconsin =

- Community
- Location within Wisconsin Location within the United States
- Coordinates: 42°33′25″N 88°11′04″W
- Country: United States
- State: Wisconsin
- County: Kenosha
- Village: Salem Lakes
- Elevation: 761 ft (232 m)
- Time zone: UTC-6 (Central (CST))
  - Summer (DST): UTC-5 (CDT)
- Area code: 262
- GNIS feature ID: 1565230

Fox River (also Foxriver) is a community located in the village of Salem Lakes, Kenosha County, Wisconsin, United States.

== History ==
A post office called Fox River was established in 1866, and remained in operation until it was discontinued in 1929. The community was named from its location on the Fox River.
