= Francis Paddock =

19th-century American pioneer

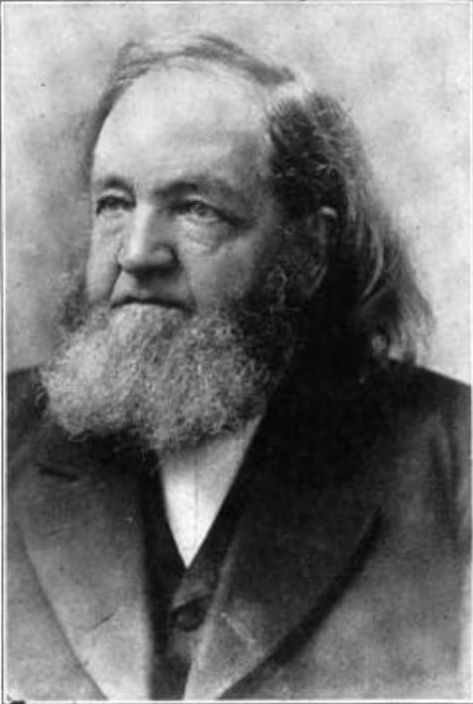

Member of the Wisconsin Senate from the 8th district
- In office January 1, 1855 – January 1, 1856
- Preceded by: Levi Grant
- Succeeded by: C. Latham Sholes

Personal details
- Born: September 15, 1814 Camillus, New York, U.S.
- Died: March 29, 1889 (aged 74) Salem, Wisconsin, U.S.
- Resting place: Union Cemetery; Salem, Wisconsin
- Party: Republican
- Spouse: Martha Cecilia Munson (m. 1841–1889)
- Children: 14

Francis Paddock (September 15, 1814 – March 29, 1889) was an American medical doctor, farmer, politician, and Wisconsin pioneer. He was one of the earliest American settlers of Kenosha County, Wisconsin, and represented Kenosha County for one year in the Wisconsin Senate (1855). He is the namesake of the lake and village of Paddock Lake, Wisconsin.

== Background ==
Francis Paddock was born in Camillus, Onondaga County, New York, on September 15, 1814. He was the eldest of six children and took his education seriously from an early age, starting to teach at age seventeen. He attended Fairfield Medical College with the goal of becoming a physician. Fairfield Medical College was the first medical school west of the Hudson River. He later received an appointment with a Dr. Hamilton of Auburn, allowing him to pursue his medical endeavors.

== Life in Wisconsin ==
In 1838, at the age of twenty-five and finished with his medical education, Paddock and his family, three generations of it, traveled west from New York in a covered wagon to what was then the Wisconsin Territory. On the way, he passed Chicago and described it as "a marsh with a few Indian huts scattered here and there." He and his family settled between two lakes now known as Paddock and Hooker Lakes in the town of Salem in Kenosha County, Wisconsin (now the village of Salem Lakes, Wisconsin). The eldest member of the group, David Paddock, Francis's grandfather, was a Revolutionary War veteran and died shortly after the trip. He was called 'Blind David' because he was blinded from powder burn injuries he sustained during the war. Starting their new life, the Paddock family was able to purchase about 400 acres (1.6 km^{2}) of land from the government at $1.50 an acre and built a log cabin on the land.

On August 19, 1841, he married Martha Cecilla Munson. They had fourteen children together, nine of whom survived to adulthood with five dying in childhood. Paddock was the first medical professional in the area. However, he was a man of multiple trades. Not only a physician, he was also a businessman and a farmer. He ended up becoming one of the wealthiest and most influential members of his community. In 1843, he acquired 281 acres (1.14 km^{2}) of land from the U.S. Land Patent Office. He became well known and respected for his expertise in treating fevers and also for his large cattle herd.

The Paddock farm had between 1500 and 2000 sheep and at one time over 100 cows and perhaps as many horses. Paddock was an example of the typical country doctor, having to ride horseback for miles in all kinds of Wisconsin weather. He carried medicines in saddlebags and had howling wolves following him during the winter months.

Paddock would store his medicines on shelves in the pantry. Sometimes when his supplies got low, he would divide up what was left among patients. If someone needed a tooth pulled, he would do the job for 25 cents. One night he delivered a baby at a home that did not have a candle. He solved the problem by putting grease in a dish, placing a rag in it and lighting it.

Concerned with providing his children the best education possible, Paddock's land became the site of the Paddock school house, which was built in 1843. The building still stands as a house next to Brass Ball Fruit Stand in Salem Lakes, Wisconsin. When there was a lack of funds to pay a teacher, he often kept a teacher in the house for his own children, as well as the neighbor children, and paid the salary himself. He converted the front room of his home into a school room for this purpose.

== Public office ==
From 1842 to 1844, he was a supervisor of the town of Salem. He also served his town as the Commissioner of Schools and Justice of the Peace. He was elected on the Republican ticket to represent Kenosha County in the Wisconsin State Senate for the 1855 session. He ran for the state Assembly in 1873, but lost to Reform Party candidate Robert S. Houston.

== Death ==
Paddock died on March 29, 1889, in his home in Salem and was laid to rest in Salem Cemetery.

In 1960, the hamlet known as Paddock Lake in the Town of Salem was approved to separate from Salem and The Village of Paddock Lake was created.
