= Randall, Wisconsin =

Town of Randall, Wisconsin
- Town
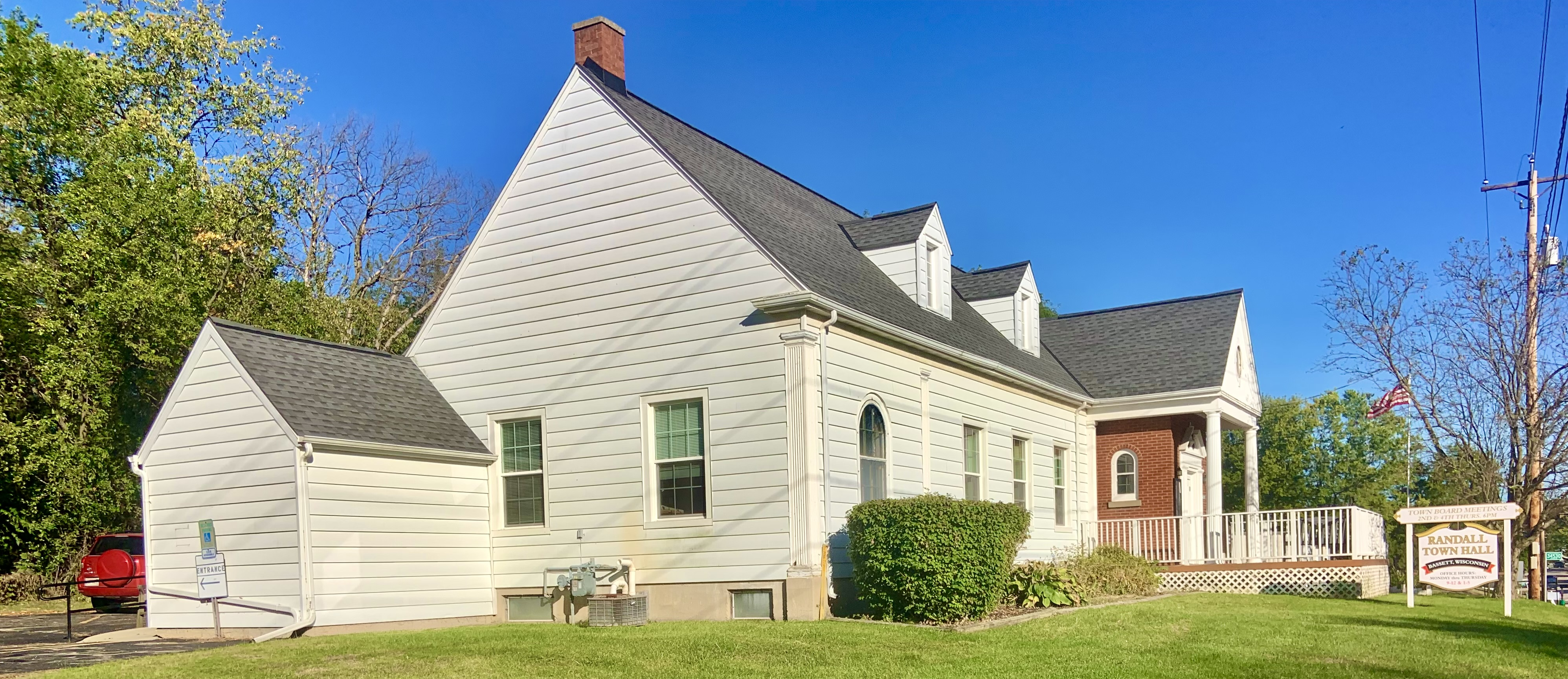
- Town hall

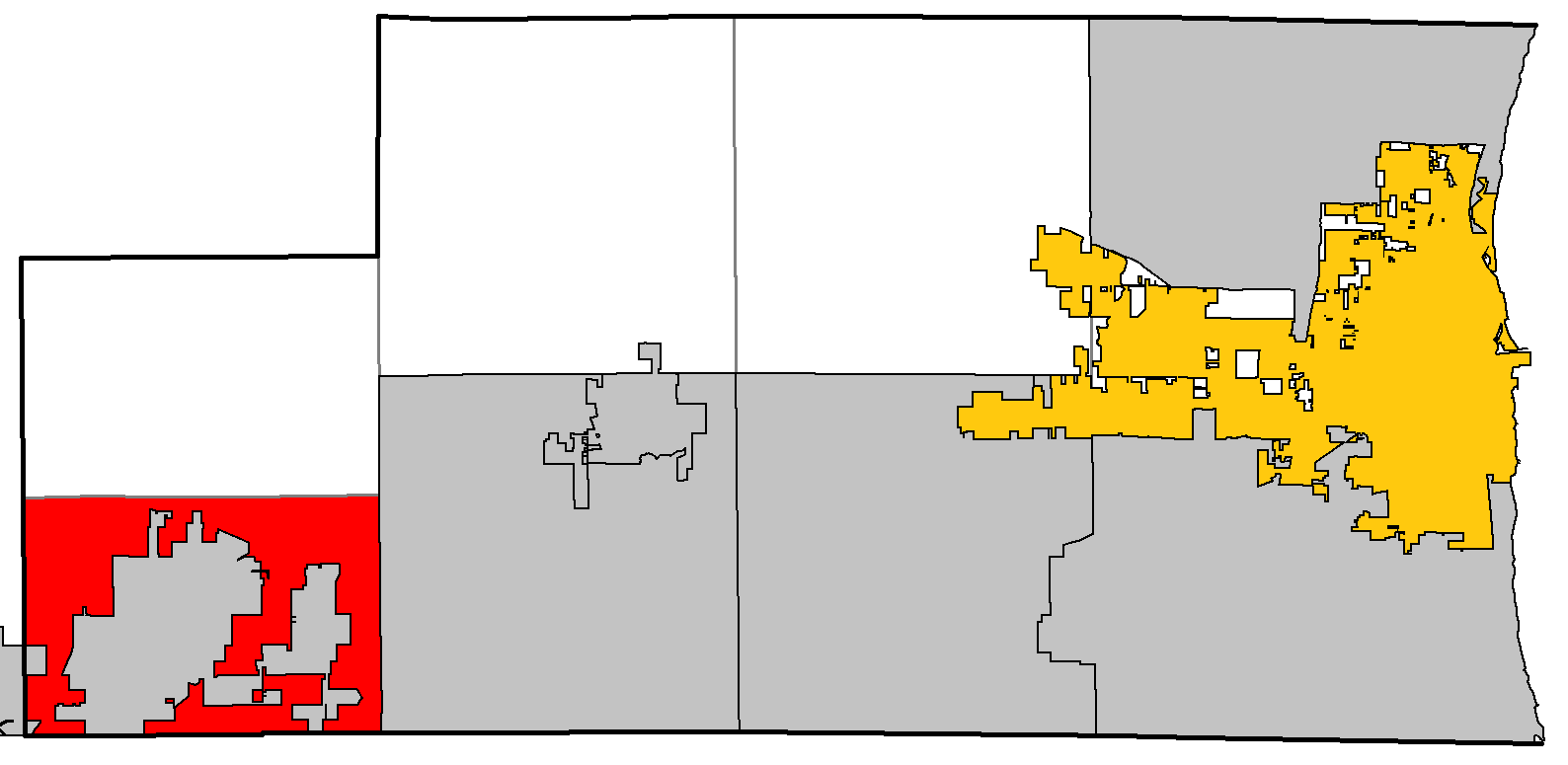
- Location of the Town of Randall, within Kenosha County
- Coordinates: 42°31′53″N 88°16′24″W
- Country: United States
- State: Wisconsin
- County: Kenosha

Area
  - Total: 13.9 sq mi (35.9 km^{2})
  - Land: 13.2 sq mi (34.2 km^{2})
  - Water: 0.66 sq mi (1.7 km^{2})
- Elevation: 791 ft (241 m)

Population (2020)
  - Total: 3,285
  - Density: 240/sq mi (93/km^{2})
- Time zone: UTC-6 (Central (CST))
  - Summer (DST): UTC-5 (CDT)
- Area code: 262
- FIPS code: 55-66125
- GNIS feature ID: 1583994
- Website: townofrandall.gov

Randall is a town in Kenosha County, Wisconsin, United States. The population was 3,285 at the 2020 census. The unincorporated community of Bassett and census-designated place of Powers Lake are located in Randall, and the town surrounds the village of Twin Lakes, a separate municipality.

== History ==
The first settler in the Town of Randall was Daniel T. Eldredge, who located on Mound Prairie in Randall in the autumn of 1836.

== Geography ==
According to the United States Census Bureau, the town has a total area of 13.9 square miles (35.9 km^{2}), of which 13.2 square miles (34.2 km^{2}) are land and 0.66 square miles (1.7 km^{2}), or 4.72%, are water.

== Demographics ==
Historical population
Census	Pop.	Note	%±
2000	2,929		—
2010	3,180		8.6%
2020	3,285		3.3%
U.S. Decennial Census

=== 2020 census ===
Randall town, Kenosha County, Wisconsin – Racial and ethnic composition Note: the US Census treats Hispanic/Latino as an ethnic category. This table excludes Latinos from the racial categories and assigns them to a separate category. Hispanics/Latinos may be of any race.
Race / Ethnicity (NH = Non-Hispanic)	Pop 2000	Pop 2010	Pop 2020	% 2000	% 2010	% 2020
White alone (NH)	2,820	3,054	3,025	96.28%	96.04%	92.09%
Black or African American alone (NH)	9	6	5	0.31%	0.19%	0.15%
Native American or Alaska Native alone (NH)	2	5	9	0.07%	0.16%	0.27%
Asian alone (NH)	7	13	7	0.24%	0.41%	0.21%
Native Hawaiian or Pacific Islander alone (NH)	0	0	0	0.00%	0.00%	0.00%
Other race alone (NH)	0	4	17	0.00%	0.13%	0.52%
Mixed race or Multiracial (NH)	24	14	107	0.82%	0.44%	3.26%
Hispanic or Latino (any race)	67	84	115	2.29%	2.64%	3.50%
Total	2,929	3,180	3,285	100.00%	100.00%	100.00%

=== 2000 census ===
As of the census of 2000, there were 2,929 people, 1,031 households, and 830 families residing in the town. The population density was 184.3 inhabitants per square mile (71.2/km^{2}). There were 1,278 housing units at an average density of 80.4 per square mile (31.0/km^{2}). The racial makeup of the town was 97.88% White, 0.31% African American, 0.07% Native American, 0.27% Asian, 0.24% from other races, and 1.23% from two or more races. Hispanic or Latino of any race were 2.29% of the population.

There were 1,031 households, out of which 39.9% had children under the age of 18 living with them, 69.5% were married couples living together, 7.9% had a female householder with no husband present, and 19.4% were non-families. 15.1% of all households were made up of individuals, and 6.3% had someone living alone who was 65 years of age or older. The average household size was 2.84 and the average family size was 3.15.

In the town, the population was spread out, with 28.0% under the age of 18, 5.9% from 18 to 24, 29.9% from 25 to 44, 24.6% from 45 to 64, and 11.5% who were 65 years of age or older. The median age was 38 years. For every 100 females, there were 101.6 males. For every 100 females age 18 and over, there were 98.8 males.

The median income for a household in the town was $63,063, and the median income for a family was $65,094. Males had a median income of $46,017 versus $28,309 for females. The per capita income for the town was $22,000. About 2.6% of families and 3.9% of the population were below the poverty line, including 2.6% of those under age 18 and 1.9% of those age 65 or over.

== Notable people ==
- George H. Kroncke, Wisconsin state representative
- John F. Reynolds, Wisconsin state representative and senator
