= Paris (community), Wisconsin =

Paris, Wisconsin
- Unincorporated community
- Location within Wisconsin Location within the United States
- Coordinates: 42°38′01″N 88°03′05″W
- Country: United States
- State: Wisconsin
- County: Kenosha
- Town: Paris
- Elevation: 755 ft (230 m)
- Time zone: UTC-6 (Central (CST))
  - Summer (DST): UTC-5 (CDT)
- Area code: 262
- GNIS feature ID: 1571034

Paris is a small unincorporated community in north-central Kenosha County, Wisconsin, United States, located at U.S. Route 45 and Wisconsin Highway 142 in the town of Paris. The name was chosen by 19th century settler Seth Butler Myrick in honor of the town of his birth in Oneida County, New York. Paris is the site of the Paris Corners town cemetery. The area once had the nickname "Tar Corners", after an incident where a dispute between neighbors led to a tarring and feathering. A post office opened in 1845, closing in 1903.
