= Liberty Corner =

Liberty Corner or Liberty Corners may refer to:

== Places ==
- Liberty Corners, Wisconsin
- Liberty Corner, New Jersey

== Other ==
- Liberty Corners, a 1905 play by Anthony E. Wills
