= Camp Lake, Wisconsin =

- Former CDP
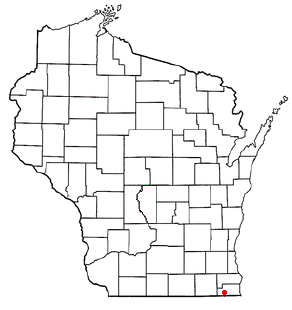
- Location of Camp Lake, Wisconsin
- Coordinates: 42°32′5″N 88°8′37″W
- Country: United States
- State: Wisconsin
- County: Kenosha
- Village: Salem Lakes

Area
  - Total: 5.4 sq mi (14.1 km^{2})
  - Land: 4.5 sq mi (11.6 km^{2})
  - Water: 0.93 sq mi (2.4 km^{2})
- Elevation: 751 ft (229 m)

Population (2010)
  - Total: 3,665
  - Density: 818/sq mi (316/km^{2})
- Time zone: UTC-6 (Central (CST))
  - Summer (DST): UTC-5 (CDT)
- ZIP Code: 53109
- Area code: 262
- FIPS code: 55-12400
- GNIS feature ID: 1562628

Camp Lake is a neighborhood and former census-designated place in the village of Salem Lakes, Kenosha County, Wisconsin, United States. The population of Camp Lake was 3,665 at the 2010 census. Upon incorporation of the village of Salem Lakes in 2017, the census statistical boundaries for the neighborhood ceased to exist.

== History ==
Camp Lake was named after a lake noted on the first township surveys. When the Wisconsin Central/Soo railroad came through the area, there was a depot stop created as Camp Lake. Prior to that, James McVey had a hotel called the Camp Lake Hotel and Gardens. The earliest visitors to Camp Lake were children and their mothers from Chicago. The Camp still operates and continues to offer community services. Camp Lake has had a post office since the 1910 era.

Center Lake and Camp Lake were noted on the earliest maps as two separate lakes with an isthmus. Navigators cannot traverse the isthmus. The high level of this isthmus made this the choice area for the Wisconsin Central/Soo Railroad to cross between the lakes and escape the low-lying areas to the south of Camp Lake.

In the 1920s, Camp Lake Oaks subdivision was the location of one of the nation's early radio stations, WCLO, for "Camp Lake Oaks". Camp Lake Oaks was a subdivision built on property owned at one time by the Knickerbocker Ice Company on the northeast corner of Camp Lake south of the Soo rail line. Charles Whitmore used the radio station to advertise his "new" subdivision and offer the community music and news on the air waves. The building where the station was located is now a private residence. The station is still on the air in Janesville, Wisconsin.

Many of the early (1840–50) buildings in this hamlet still exist, although they are not being used for their original purposes. Hotels are now apartments, grocery stores are now restaurants, and residences are now businesses.

== Geography ==
Camp Lake is located at 42°31′33″N 88°8′21″W (42.525918, -88.139247). According to the United States Census Bureau, the CDP has a total area of 5.4 square miles (14.1 km^{2}), of which 4.5 square miles (11.7 km^{2}) is land and 0.9 square mile (2.4 km^{2}) (17.28%) is water. (Camp Lake and Center Lake)

== Image ==
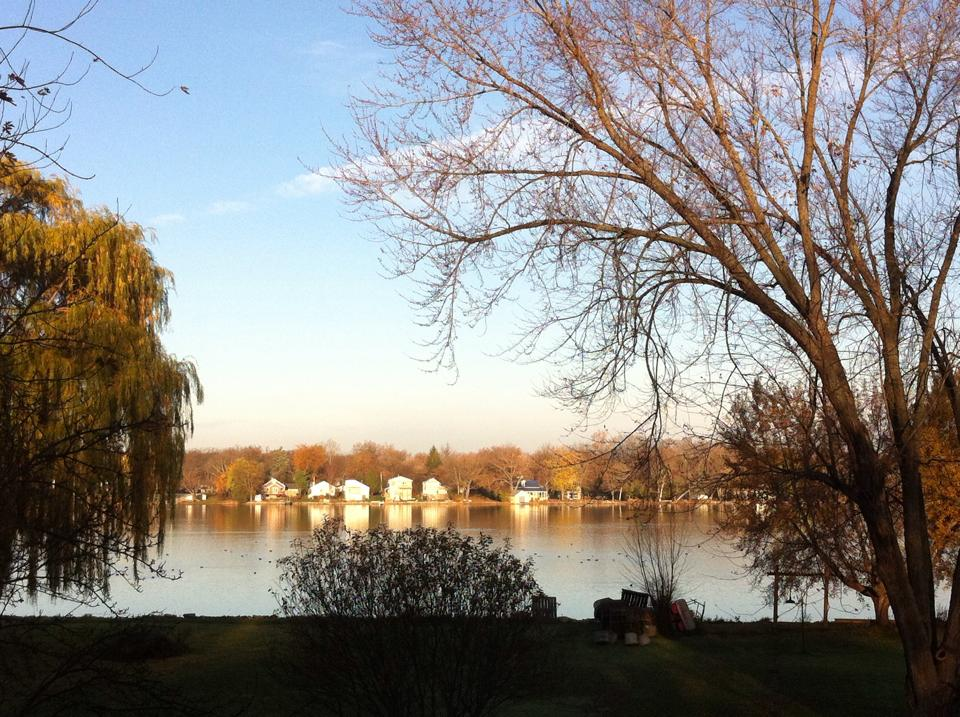

== Demographics ==
Historical population
| Census | Pop. | Note | %± |
|---|---|---|---|
| 2000 | 3,255 | | — |
| 2010 | 3,665 | | 12.6% |
U.S. Decennial Census

As of the census of 2000, there were 3,255 people, 1,149 households, and 875 families residing in the CDP. The population density was 724.0 inhabitants per square mile (279.5/km^{2}). There were 1,310 housing units at an average density of 291.4 per square mile (112.5/km^{2}). The racial makeup of the CDP was 97.45% White, 0.37% African American, 0.31% Native American, 0.28% Asian, 1.04% from other races, and 0.55% from two or more races. Hispanic or Latino of any race were 2.83% of the population.

There were 1,149 households, out of which 43.5% had children under the age of 18 living with them, 62.4% were married couples living together, 9.6% had a female householder with no husband present, and 23.8% were non-families. 19.1% of all households were made up of individuals, and 4.8% had someone living alone who was 65 years of age or older. The average household size was 2.83 and the average family size was 3.25.

In the CDP, the population was spread out, with 30.9% under the age of 18, 6.3% from 18 to 24, 36.1% from 25 to 44, 19.2% from 45 to 64, and 7.5% who were 65 years of age or older. The median age was 34 years. For every 100 females, there were 102.2 males. For every 100 females age 18 and over, there were 98.9 males.

The median income for a household in the CDP was $42,986, and the median income for a family was $48,523. Males had a median income of $39,515 versus $26,544 for females. The per capita income for the CDP was $17,863. About 8.0% of families and 9.8% of the population were below the poverty line, including 11.3% of those under age 18 and 8.7% of those age 65 or over.
