= Rouse Simmons (politician) =

American politician

Rouse Simmons (September 10, 1832 – September 10, 1897) was an American politician and businessman.

== Background ==
Born in Marcy, New York, Simmons moved to Kenosha, Wisconsin in 1849. He was a merchant and was in the insurance and real estate business. His brother was Zalmon G. Simmons. Simmons served on the Kenosha County, Wisconsin Board of Supervisors. In 1875, Simmons served in the Wisconsin State Assembly as a Republican. He died in Kenosha, Wisconsin.

== Legacy ==
The schooner Rouse Simmons was named after Simmons.
