= List of lakes of Crawford County, Arkansas =

There are at least 24 named lakes and reservoirs in Crawford County, Arkansas.

== Lakes ==
- Hollis Lake, 35°22′40″N 094°17′58″W, el. 384 feet (117 m)
- Ned Lake, 35°23′31″N 094°19′02″W, el. 387 feet (118 m)
- Switchback Lake, 35°44′53″N 094°21′28″W, el. 1,430 feet (440 m)
- Wildcat Lake, 33°05′32″N 092°07′13″W, el. 62 feet (19 m)

== Reservoirs ==
- Beverly Hills Lake, 35°32′06″N 094°21′52″W, el. 840 feet (260 m)
- Brandenburg Lake, 35°34′00″N 094°06′08″W, el. 797 feet (243 m)
- Cold Spring Lake, 35°43′33″N 094°24′43″W, el. 906 feet (276 m)
- Hall Lake, 35°24′31″N 094°13′13″W, el. 404 feet (123 m)
- Hammond Lake, 35°36′54″N 094°08′19″W, el. 938 feet (286 m)
- Johnson Lake, 35°40′24″N 094°02′37″W, el. 1,430 feet (440 m)
- Lake Alma, 35°30′07″N 094°13′11″W, el. 515 feet (157 m)
- Lake Fort Smith, 35°38′36″N 094°08′01″W, el. 1,424 feet (434 m)
- Lake Shepherd Springs, 35°41′50″N 094°06′11″W, el. 899 feet (274 m)
- Lake Sheppard Spring Reservoir, 35°41′42″N 094°06′25″W, el. 899 feet (274 m)
- Lee Creek Reservoir, 35°29′03″N 094°23′40″W, el. 400 feet (120 m)
- Louemma Lake, 35°27′55″N 094°21′30″W, el. 495 feet (151 m)
- Montgomery Lake, 35°28′48″N 094°24′43″W, el. 443 feet (135 m)
- Morris Lake, 35°31′30″N 094°13′49″W, el. 745 feet (227 m)
- Mount Gaylor Lake, 35°45′06″N 094°06′59″W, el. 2,057 feet (627 m)
- Ozark Lake, 35°27′38″N 094°01′45″W, el. 371 feet (113 m)
- Pine Mountain Lake, 35°38′15″N 094°22′10″W, el. 751 feet (229 m)
- Swearinger Lake, 35°39′06″N 094°20′49″W, el. 732 feet (223 m)
- T J House Reservoir, 35°33′02″N 094°04′37″W, el. 522 feet (159 m)
- Van Buren Water Reservoir, 35°26′44″N 094°21′23″W, el. 636 feet (194 m)

== See also ==
- List of lakes in Arkansas
