= Bassett, Wisconsin =

- Unincorporated community
- Location within Wisconsin Location within the United States
- Coordinates: 42°32′26″N 88°13′40″W
- Country: United States
- State: Wisconsin
- County: Kenosha
- Town: Randall
- Elevation: 774 ft (236 m)
- Time zone: UTC-6 (Central (CST))
  - Summer (DST): UTC-5 (CDT)
- ZIP Code: 53101
- Area code: 262
- GNIS feature ID: 1561291

Bassett is an unincorporated community in the town of Randall in southwestern Kenosha County, Wisconsin, United States. The Randall Town Hall is in the community.

== History ==
Bassett was first settled by Henry Bassett and his son Reuben in 1842, six years before Wisconsin statehood, when 120 acres (49 ha) were purchased. The population accelerated when the Kenosha and Rockford Railroad was built through the community in the later 19th century, and Henry Bassett contributed land for that purpose. The railroad was abandoned in May 1939. The community was originally known as Bassett's Station and then Bassetts.
