= Montgomery Lake (Kenosha County, Wisconsin) =

Lake in the state of Wisconsin, United States

- Location within Wisconsin Location within the United States
- Location: Kenosha County, Wisconsin
- Coordinates: 42°33′09″N 088°05′13″W
- Basin countries: United States
- Surface area: 161 acres (65 ha)
- Max. depth: 23 ft (7.0 m)
- Surface elevation: 797 ft (243 m)

Montgomery Lake is located near Paddock Lake, Wisconsin and is North of 83rd Street and 258th Avenue. It is one of twenty-six lakes in Kenosha County.
