= Alex Davison Bailey =

Alex Davison Bailey (February 14, 1882 – June 18, 1968) was an American mechanical and utilities executive, who served as the 64th president of the American Society of Mechanical Engineers in 1945–46.

Bailey was born in what is now Salem Lakes, Wisconsin, son of Eugene M. Bailey and Caroline G. (Davison) Bailey. He obtained his BSc in Mechanical Engineering in 1903 from the Lewis Institute in Chicago, now Illinois Institute of Technology. Before his graduation Bailey had started his career as draftsman at the U.S Wind Engine and Pump Company in Batavia, Illinois, and had been trouble man at the Evanston Heating Co. in Evanston, Illinois.

After his graduation Bailey started his lifelong career at the Chicago Edison Co., soon to be Commonwealth Edison. From 1903 to 1905 he started as draftsman, from 1906 to 1916 he was assistant chief engineer at Fisk Street Station, and another chief engineer. From 1921 to 1932 he was superintendent of generating stations of the company, and in 1933 appointed assistant chief operating engineer. From 1936 to 1942 he was chief operating engineer and manager of the Super Power department. The last years ten years at the company he was vice-president in charge of operations and engineering. He retired on February 1, 1952 after 48 years of service. In 1942 Bailey had been awarded the Honorary Doctor of Science by the Northwestern University.
