= George H. Kroncke =

American farmer and politician (1837–1915)

George H. Kroncke (February 8, 1837 – June 27, 1915) was an American farmer and politician.

Born in Germany, Kroncke settled in the town of Randall, Kenosha County, Wisconsin in 1872 and was a farmer. Kroncke served as a justice of the peace, on the school board and was a Democrat. In 1893, Kroncke was elected, in a special election, to the Wisconsin State Assembly, replacing Daniel A. Mahoney who died in office. Kroncke died at his home in Kenosha, Wisconsin.
