= Benet Lake, Wisconsin =

- Community
- Location within Wisconsin Location within the United States
- Coordinates: 42°29′53″N 88°04′54″W
- Country: United States
- State: Wisconsin
- County: Kenosha
- Village: Salem Lakes
- Elevation: 860 ft (260 m)
- Time zone: UTC-6 (Central (CST))
  - Summer (DST): UTC-5 (CDT)
- ZIP code: 53102
- Area code: 262
- GNIS feature ID: 1572199

Benet Lake (also Renet Lake) is a community in the village of Salem Lakes in Kenosha County, Wisconsin, United States. It is located north of Antioch, Illinois. The community takes its name from the Benedictine Fathers, who own the south side of Benet Lake and established a monastery/seminary in 1945.
