= Liberty Corners, Wisconsin =

- Neighborhood
- Location within Wisconsin Location within the United States
- Coordinates: 42°31′15″N 88°05′57″W
- Country: United States
- State: Wisconsin
- County: Kenosha
- Village: Salem Lakes
- Elevation: 840 ft (260 m)
- Time zone: UTC-6 (Central (CST))
  - Summer (DST): UTC-5 (CDT)
- Area code: 262
- GNIS feature ID: 1568012

Liberty Corners is a neighborhood in the village of Salem Lakes in south-central Kenosha County, Wisconsin, United States. It is centered at the intersection of Highway 83 and Wilmot Road (Kenosha County Highway C).
