= Daniel A. Mahoney =

American politician

Daniel A. Mahoney (December 27, 1849 – January 27, 1893) was an American businessman and politician.

Born in the town of Salem, Kenosha County, Wisconsin, Mahoney went to the Kenosha High School and a commercial college. He taught school and was superintendent of school for Kenosha County. In 1883, Mahoney was admitted to the Wisconsin bar. Then, in 1884, Mahoney was elected district attorney for Kenosha County and was a Democrat. He was also in the real estate and insurance business. In 1887, President Grover Cleveland appointed Mahoney postmaster of Kenosha, Wisconsin. Mahoney served in the Wisconsin State Assembly during the 1893 session. Mahoney died in Madison, Wisconsin of pneumonia and inflammation of the bowels while the Wisconsin Legislature was in session in January 1893. George H. Kroncke was elected in a special election to succeed Mahoney in the Wisconsin Assembly.
