= Cross Lake (Wisconsin/Illinois) =

Lake along the Wisconsin–Illinois state line

Coordinates: 42°29′49″N 88°05′14″W

Cross Lake is an 89-acre (36 ha) lake that straddles the Wisconsin–Illinois state line. It has a maximum depth of 35 feet. Half of the lake is in Kenosha County, Wisconsin and the other half of it is in Illinois.
