= S. Dwight Slade =

American politician

S. Dwight Slade (February 8, 1849 – February 4, 1931) was a member of the Wisconsin State Assembly.

== Biography ==
Slade was born on February 8, 1849, in Wheatland, Kenosha County, Wisconsin. He later moved to Slades Corners, Wisconsin. He died on February 4, 1931.

== Career ==
Slade was elected to the Assembly in 1898 and was re-elected in 1900 and 1902. Additionally, he was the chairman of the Wheatland Board of Supervisors from 1883 to 1890. He was a Republican.
