= Ned Lake =

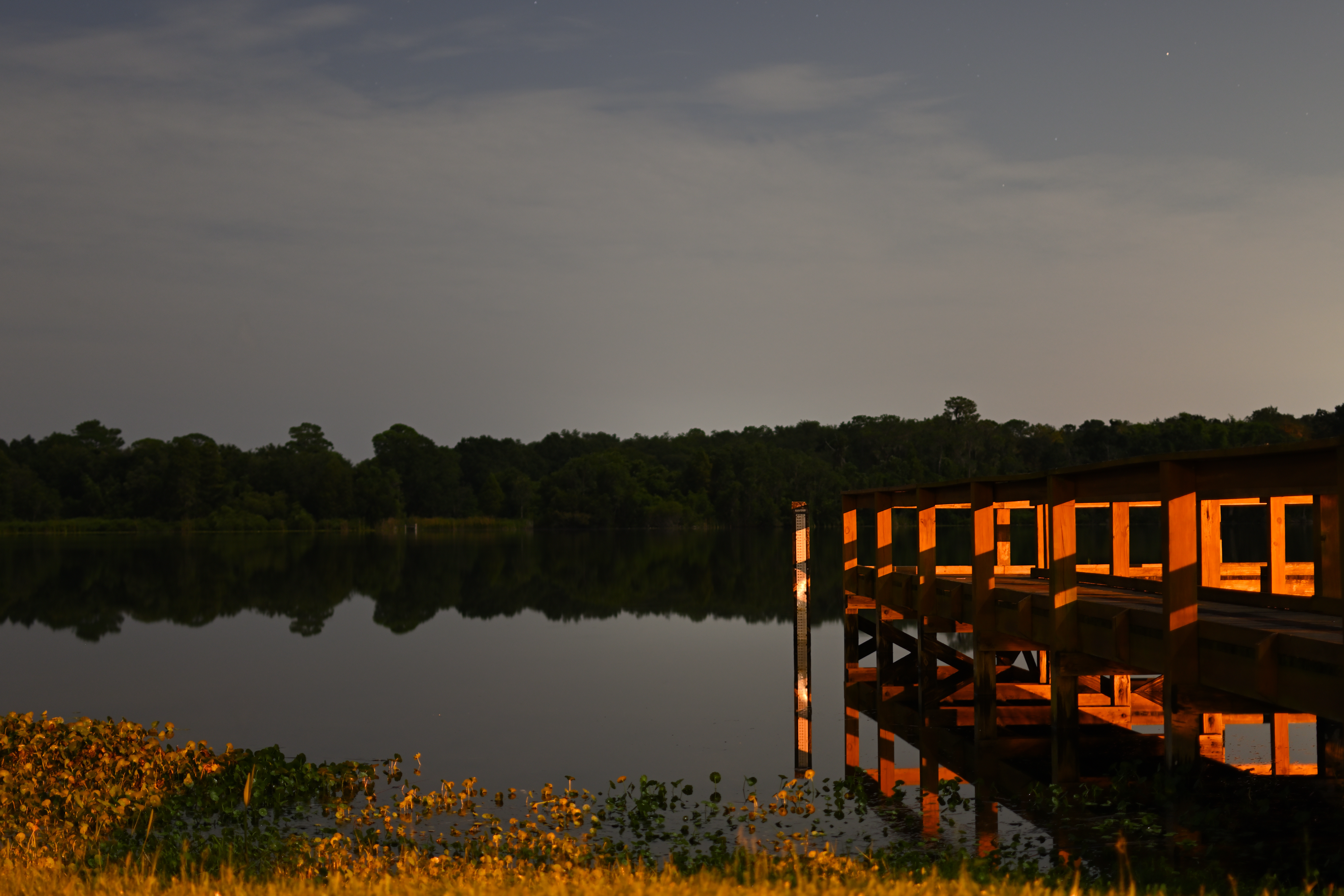
- Public dock at Lake Ned Park during a supermoon

- Location within Florida
- Location: Polk County, Florida
- Coordinates: 27.9967°N 81.6701°W
- Type: natural freshwater lake
- Basin countries: United States
- Max. length: 2,585 feet (788 m)
- Max. width: 1,470 feet (450 m)
- Surface area: 72.38 acres (29 ha)
- Surface elevation: 131 feet (40 m)
- Settlements: Winter Haven, Florida

Ned Lake (or sometimes called Lake Ned) is a natural freshwater lake in eastern Winter Haven, Florida. It has a 72.38-acre (292,900 m^{2}) surface area and is somewhat irregular in shape. The main part of the lake is oval in shape and on the southeast is a rounded cove. This lake is bordered by residences on the south, southwest, the northwest and the north. On the east side is the 42-acre (170,000 m^{2}) wooded Street Nature Center.

Ned Lake has no public swimming areas. On the northwest, along Lake Ned Road, is a small park with a few picnic tables and a public boat ramp. The Street Nature Center, on the east side of the lake, is owned and operated by the National Audubon Society. At its center is a house dating from 1912. The Center was opened in 1973, after the property was donated to the Audubon Society in 1970. Conservation meetings and student field trips are conducted at the Street Nature Center and it has a small, but private, boat ramp. The Hook and Bullet website says Ned Lake contains largemouth bass, bluegill and crappie.
