= Dwight L. Burgess =

American politician

Dwight L. Burgess (December 19, 1841 in the Town of Brighton, Kenosha County, Wisconsin), was a member of the Wisconsin State Assembly. He was the first Euro-American child to be born there. Lathrop Burgess, his father, was also a member of the Assembly. Burgess attended Eastman Business College. On August 28, 1865, he married Harriette A. Northway. They had a son. Burgess and his wife were Congregationalists. – November 9, 1937), was a member of the Wisconsin State Assembly.

Burgess owned farms in the Town of Brighton and the Town of Paris, Kenosha County, Wisconsin. From 1902 to 1932, he resided in Bristol, Wisconsin. He died on November 9, 1937.

== Political career ==
Burgess was elected to the Assembly in 1888.He was also chairman of the Town of Brighton and a school board member. He was Republican.
