= Kenosha Public Library =

Library in Kenosha, Wisconsin, United States

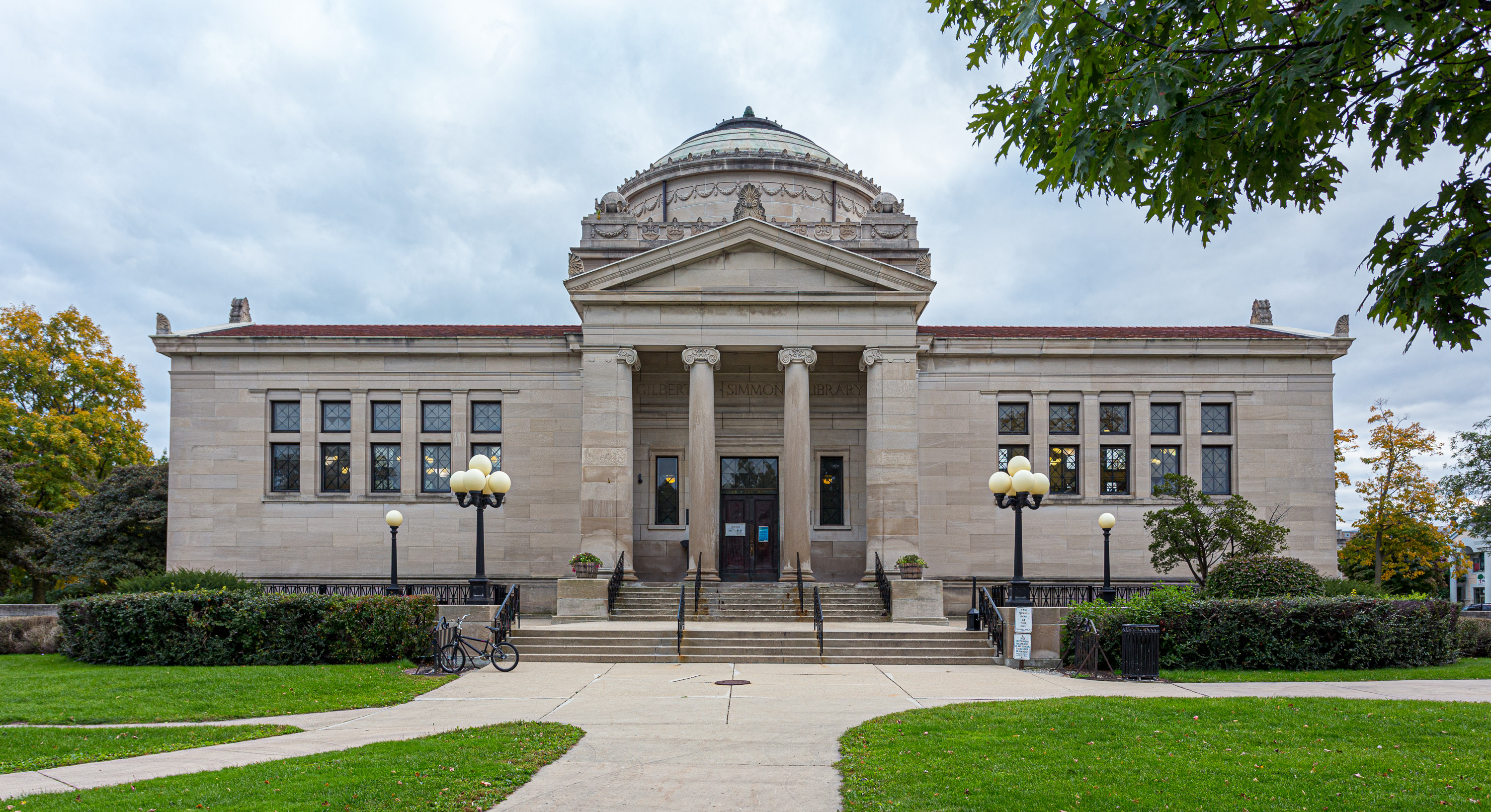
- Gilbert M. Simmons Library, a branch library and formerly the main library of the KPL
- 42°33′34.3″N 87°51′11.6″W
- Type: Public library
- Established: March 14, 1896; 130 years ago (as privately run Kenosha Public Library); March 19, 1900; 126 years ago (as Gilbert M. Simmons Library)
- Service area: Kenosha, Wisconsin
- Branches: 5

Access and use
- Population served: 137,750 (2022)

Other information
- Director: Sarah Townsend
- Employees: 70 (2022)
- Parent organization: Kenosha County Library System (KCLS)
- Affiliation: SHARE Consortium
- Public transit access: Kenosha Area Transit
- Website: mykpl.info

The Kenosha Public Library (KPL) is the public library serving the city of Kenosha, Wisconsin, United States. It is the resource library for the Kenosha County Library System (KCLS), of which it is a member.

== Governance ==
The KPL is governed by a board of trustees appointed by the mayor of Kenosha and approved by the city council. The board is composed of nine citizen members: eight City of Kenosha residents and one representative of the Kenosha Unified School District. KPL is a member of the SHARE Consortium.

== Organization and services ==
The library has an outreach department and five branches:

Branch	Address	Established	Present building opened	Website	Notes
Simmons Neighborhood Library	711 59th Pl, Kenosha	March 19, 1900; 126 years ago	July 19, 1900; 126 years ago		
Uptown Neighborhood Library	2419 63rd St, Kenosha	October 14, 1914; 112 years ago	July 1, 1925; 101 years ago		Established as the "West Branch Library."
Northside Neighborhood Library	1500 27th Ave, Kenosha	May 28, 1919; 107 years ago	June 6, 1993; 33 years ago		Established as the "North Branch Library."
Southwest Neighborhood Library	7979 38th Ave, Kenosha	January 16, 1981; 45 years ago	June 28, 2004; 22 years ago		The KCLS main resource library.
Kids@Uptown Lofts	6144 22nd Ave, Kenosha	July 13, 2024; 2 years ago	-		K-5 children's library.

The library offers audiobook, e-book, and eMagazine services, including OverDrive eBooks & eAudiobooks, TeachingBooks Library, Ebsco eBooks, and online tutoring, via the library's website.

== History ==
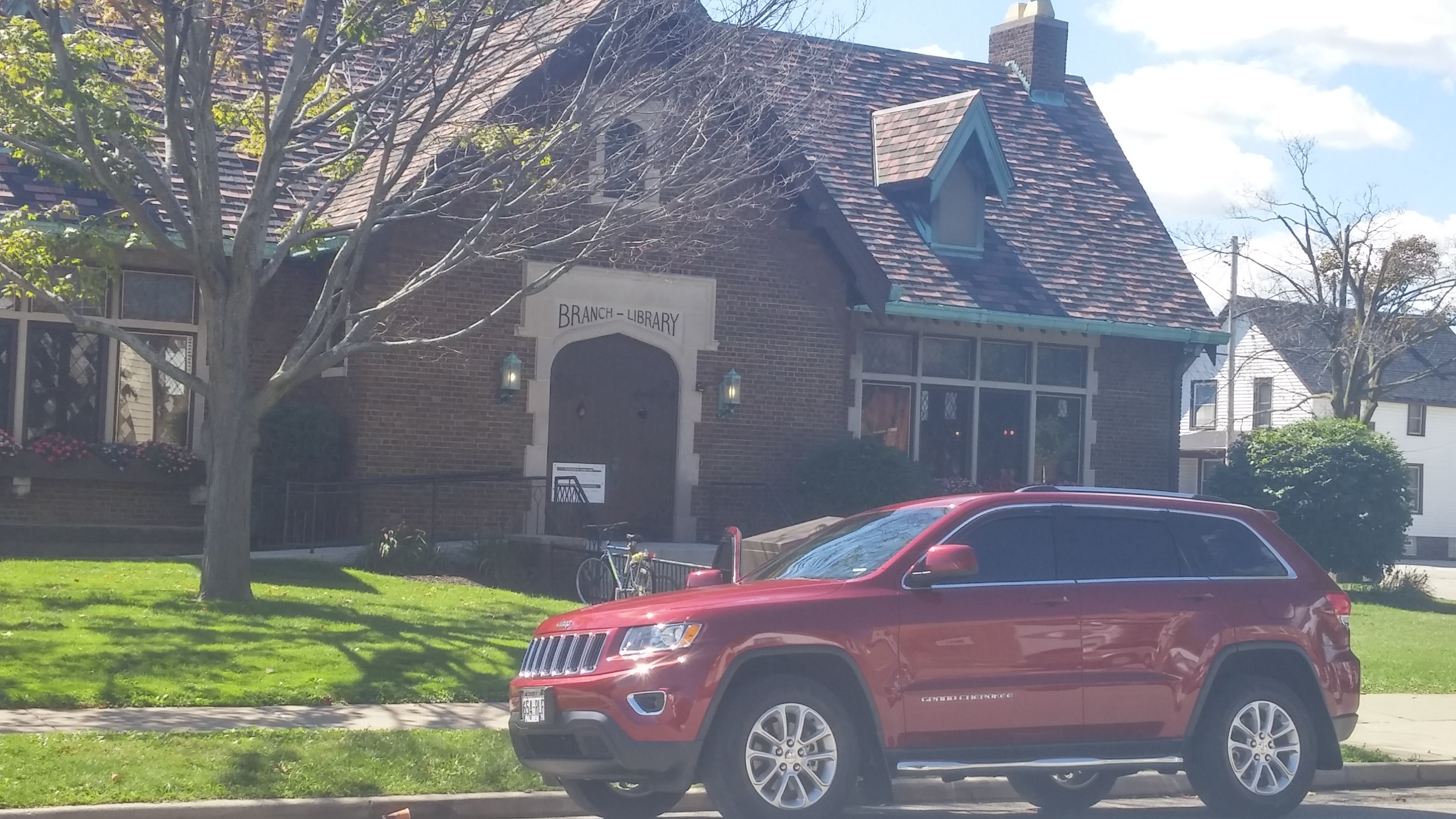
Uptown Neighborhood Library

=== Early efforts ===
As early as November 1841, a newspaper editor in Southport (Kenosha from 1850) proposed establishing a free public library "open to all". By June 1842, private circulating libraries were organized. On November 25, 1843, a group of prominent residents attempted to establish a public library, forming the Southport Library Association. The association's members included William Bullen, a Southport founder, and Frederick Winslow Hatch, the Episcopal rector of St. Matthew's Church and former Chaplain of the United States Senate. Chaired by Hatch, the association elected directors and adopted bylaws, but made no further progress.

In February 1871, Zalmon G. Simmons, a local businessman and future Kenosha mayor, purchased several hundred books and established a free library for Kenosha County residents in the local Unitarian church, of which he was a member. Books could be checked out one at a time for two weeks, with a single renewal allowed. In June 1873, Simmons first suggested a public library, to be "the finest in the State" with "a large and choice collection of books," be erected in what would become Library Park. On May 22, 1883, a special election resulted in a vote for Kenosha to accept a large bequest from the estate of a Caroline Field, intended to establish the "Cahoon Public Library." Subsequent legal difficulties delayed the city in moving forward; a court ruling in March 1890 gave the city permission to accept the bequest, which it did not.

=== First Kenosha Public Library ===
Upon arriving in Kenosha in 1894, George W. Johnston, the new editor of the Kenosha Evening News, soon recognized local demand for a public library, and promoted the cause through the newspaper. He also secured support from prominent residents. On November 14, 1895, 40 of them assembled and elected an organizing committee, comprising Johnston and businessmen Colonel William W. Strong, James Cavanagh, George A. Yule, and John O'Donnell. On December 20, 1895, the committee formally incorporated the Kenosha Public Library as a free public library.

On January 6, 1896, the library board was established. On a recommendation from Johnston, its secretary, the board leased library space in a room at 171 Main Street, owned by Zalmon Simmons. On January 27, the board elected Clara Parkinson Barnes (1854–1932), a sister-in-law of board member Cavanagh, as librarian. The library was largely ready by March 2, when the Unitarian Church free library donated its collection of approximately 800 volumes, encouraged by wide community support and a $1,000 donation to the new library from George Yule.

The first Kenosha Public Library opened on March 14, 1896, with a collection of approximately 1,200 volumes, 400 of which were fiction. All Kenosha County residents were eligible to borrow books, but were requested to not remove them from their shelves while browsing "unless absolutely necessary." At the end of the library's first year, its collection numbered over 2,500 volumes, with a circulation of 20,962. Despite its great popularity, the Kenosha Library, though a public institution, remained exclusively supported by private funds. In late 1898, with donations and library association fees found insufficient to sustain operations, the board requested the city council to provide a one-mill tax appropriation. Instead, the council approved an annual $1,200 tax appropriation on December 5, 1898, the first time city tax revenues had been utilized to support a local library.

=== Gilbert M. Simmons Library ===
==== Early history ====
Over 25 years after his initial suggestion, on January 12, 1899, Zalmon Simmons formally proposed to the city council that he be allowed to present Kenosha with a public library situated in Central (later Library) Park. Among his conditions were that the library would be named after his deceased eldest son Gilbert M. Simmons and that the city would support it with a one-mill appropriation. The council unanimously accepted Simmons' proposal on January 23. In March, the plans for the library building, designed by noted architect Daniel Burnham, were finalized. The groundbreaking took place on May 4, and construction progressed rapidly, with the structure completed on December 7. On March 19, 1900, the city council established the Gilbert M. Simmons Library as a city-funded public library, appointing a board of directors and approving the library tax appropriation the same day. On May 23, the library board held their first meeting, unanimously electing Clara Barnes librarian. The former Kenosha Public Library closed on May 26, shortly before both the new Library Park and the Simmons Memorial Library were dedicated on May 30. On July 19, the Gilbert M. Simmons Memorial Library opened to the public with initial holdings of 4,578 volumes.

The Simmons Library circulated 36,236 volumes in its first year, and by spring 1901 had permanently moved to an open-stack system. It began circulating books among Kenosha public schools in January 1903, becoming the third Wisconsin library to do so. Children's library services began in September 1907 with the appointment of Cora M. Frantz (1881–1958), previously a library assistant, as the children's librarian, together with the outfitting of a "Children's Room" in the library basement. In December 1910, Clara Barnes retired for health reasons, upon which Frantz was appointed acting librarian, being confirmed as librarian the following June.

==== Development and expansion ====
From 1911, books were also circulated through designated book deposit stations, with the first station established at the Kenosha YMCA. Although two deposit stations had previously been established at local businesses on the north side of Kenosha (in February 1903) and on the city's west side (in October 1904), respectively, both had been discontinued within months due to insufficient patronage. By 1913, Kenosha's rapid growth justified it establishing a branch library in what was then the western part of the city. On October 14, 1914, a temporary West Branch consisting of a single reading room opened in a store building at the corner of Howland and Salem Avenues, both later renamed to Roosevelt Road and 22nd Avenue, respectively. The library continued expanding the distribution of its book deposit stations, installing several in local factories. In June 1917, the West Branch moved to a new rented location at the corner of 22nd Avenue and 61st Street. On May 28, 1919, a North Side Branch library opened in a rented building at 4416 Sheridan Road.

In September 1919, a Wisconsin Library Commission survey found the original Simmons library - now the Central Library - to have "outgrown its building," deeming its "crowded and inconvenient quarters" and available floor space incompatible with modern library requirements. In response, several modifications were made to increase available space for books, but overcrowding at the Central Library remained a significant problem for the next six decades. During 1919–1920, 14 book deposit stations were installed in city schools, and the popularity of the North Side Branch resulted in its moving to larger rented rooms at 706 43rd St. In January 1924, three one-room branch libraries were established on the grounds of the Lincoln, Washington, and McKinley junior high schools. The former North Side Branch then became the Washington Branch. Named after their respective school locations and intended as combination school and community libraries, each branch was housed in a purpose-built temporary building with capacity for approximately 1,300 volumes and 36 patrons. A West Branch building was erected that year to provide more space for its collection and patrons. On May 30, 1925, the new branch building was dedicated, opening on July 1.

To expand children's library services, Kenosha purchased the disused Henry M. Simmons Memorial Unitarian Church building on January 9, 1928, converting it into the Simmons Boys' and Girls' Library. At its dedication on April 12, 1929, the new children's library, which opened the following day, was the first dedicated children's library in Wisconsin and the third nationally. During the Depression and World War II, the Simmons library continued developing its services despite a war-related fall in overall circulation. In April 1944, a classroom library at Bain Elementary was upgraded to a school and community library to better serve area patrons.

On May 1, 1946, Cora Frantz retired after 35 years as head librarian, and was succeeded by Dorothy L. Huth (1898–1979). The city's first professionally educated librarian, Huth had served as circulation librarian since 1941, prior to which she had headed the public library in Whitewater. By then, the Simmons library system consisted of the Central (Main) Simmons Library, the Boys' and Girls' Library, and the West branch library, the Washington, Lincoln, McKinley, and Bain combination school and public library branches, 120 classroom libraries across 16 public schools, and six deposit stations. On June 30, 1954, bookmobile service began with a single combination truck-trailer.

==== Library in transition ====
Kenosha Public Library Discovery Bus

With the increasing financial burdens of managing both school and adult-focused libraries, the Simmons library board progressively transferred school library operations to the Kenosha school district. In May 1960, the board commissioned an independent survey of the library system, and the McKinley branch closed as a public library in June, remaining the school library for McKinley Junior High. The board also established plans to replace the remaining school-public library branches with dedicated branch libraries in rented facilities. Also in 1960, a second booktrailer was purchased to expand service across city elementary schools; the Simmons library helped guide the schools in developing their library collections.

In April 1961, the independent library survey team, led by John Eastlick, the director of the Denver Public Library, completed its report. Along with endorsing the establishment of full-service branch libraries as a priority, the report recommended reorganizing the Simmons libraries into a countywide system and replacing the main library and the Boys' and Girls' library with a single relocated, expanded facility for both adult and children's services. Having exceeded its designed shelving capacity since 1944, the main library was forced to store 10 percent of its collection in closed stacks. The survey team and a separately contracted architect found the main library building to be unsafe, roughly seven times smaller than necessary, unable to be expanded due to its obsolete design, and poorly located. In June, the Lincoln branch exclusively became a school library for the Lincoln junior high school; its public library replacement, the Roosevelt Road branch serving southwest Kenosha, opened in a shopping center at 3812 Roosevelt Road on July 5. In June 1962, the Bain and Washington school branches were likewise transferred to the Kenosha school district and replaced with the Washington Branch library, which opened at 3817 22nd Avenue on July 9, also in a rented shopping center space. In January 1963, Dorothy Huth retired and was succeeded as library director by George E. Earley (1916–2008) from February 1; the fourth library director and its first male and first non-Kenoshan head, Earley had previously directed the Alton, Illinois library system.

== Recognition ==
In 2018, KPL received a SirsiDynix Power of Libraries Award. The Wisconsin Library Association recognized the library system as its "Library of the Year" in 2020. In 2021, KPL was named a finalist for the National Medal for Museum and Library Service, becoming the second Wisconsin library to receive this distinction after the Madison Public Library in 2016. In 2023, KPL received an honorable mention as a nominee for the Jerry Kline Community Impact Prize, which is awarded annually by the Gerald M. Kline Family Foundation and Library Journal to recognize an American public library that has made a significant positive impact in its community.
