= Montgomery Lake (Florence County, Wisconsin) =

- Location within Wisconsin Location within the United States
- Location: Florence County, Wisconsin
- Coordinates: 45.9141443°N 88.1641361°W
- Type: Lake
- Surface area: 23 acres (9.3 ha)
- Max. depth: 27 feet (8.2 m)

Montgomery Lake is a lake in Florence County, Wisconsin. It occupies 23 acres (9.3 ha) and has a maximum depth of 27 feet (8.2 m). There are panfish, largemouth bass and trout in the lake.
