= Twin Lakes, Wisconsin =

- Village
- Location of Twin Lakes in Kenosha County, Wisconsin.

- Location in the United States
- Coordinates: 42°31′18″N 88°15′46″W
- Country: United States
- State: Wisconsin
- County: Kenosha

Area
  - Total: 10.10 sq mi (26.16 km^{2})
  - Land: 8.53 sq mi (22.10 km^{2})
  - Water: 1.57 sq mi (4.06 km^{2})
- Elevation: 801 ft (244 m)

Population (2020)
  - Total: 6,309
  - Density: 727.1/sq mi (280.72/km^{2})
- Time zone: UTC−6 (Central (CST))
  - Summer (DST): UTC−5 (CDT)
- ZIP Code: 53181
- Area code: 262
- FIPS code: 55-81250
- GNIS feature ID: 1575813
- Website: twinlakeswi.gov

Twin Lakes is a village in Kenosha County, Wisconsin, United States, along the Illinois-Wisconsin border east of U.S. Highway 12, incorporated in 1937. With nearly 1000 acres of surface water, the twin lakes of Mary and Elizabeth have drawn vacationers to numerous resorts as well as ice harvesters in the days of icebox refrigeration. Today, many houses there are used for recreation, and the lakes remain a popular destination. As of the 2020 census, Twin Lakes had a population of 6,309.

== History ==
Mary Rae, a native of England was born June 15, 1816. She came to America in 1833 and resided in what was to become known as “English Prairie”. In 1837 she was married to Jonathan Imeson, also an early settler on the prairie. Their son Robert was the first born son of European descent in the county. There were eight children in all, including the first set of twins born on the prairie. The girls were baptized Mary and Elizabeth. Both lakes were named after these girls, Lake Mary & Lake Elizabeth, which extended into Illinois, and almost to the English Prairie.

A post office called Twin Lakes has been in operation since 1891.

== Geography ==
Twin Lakes is located at 42°31′18″N 88°15′46″W (42.521554, −88.262885).

According to the United States Census Bureau, the village has a total area of 9.75 square miles (25.25 km^{2}), of which 8.18 square miles (21.19 km^{2}) is land and 1.57 square miles (4.07 km^{2}) is water.

== Demographics ==
Historical population
Census	Pop.	Note	%±
1940	409		—
1950	637		55.7%
1960	1,497		135.0%
1970	2,276		52.0%
1980	3,474		52.6%
1990	3,989		14.8%
2000	5,124		28.5%
2010	5,989		16.9%
2020	6,309		5.3%
U.S. Decennial Census

=== Racial and ethnic composition ===
Twin Lakes village, Wisconsin – Racial and ethnic composition Note: the US Census treats Hispanic/Latino as an ethnic category. This table excludes Latinos from the racial categories and assigns them to a separate category. Hispanics/Latinos may be of any race.
Race / Ethnicity (NH = Non-Hispanic)	Pop 2000	Pop 2010	Pop 2020	% 2000	% 2010	% 2020
White alone (NH)	4,902	5,580	5,639	95.67%	93.17%	89.38%
Black or African American alone (NH)	18	37	29	0.35%	0.62%	0.46%
Native American or Alaska Native alone (NH)	9	14	10	0.18%	0.23%	0.16%
Asian alone (NH)	26	22	31	0.51%	0.37%	0.49%
Native Hawaiian or Pacific Islander alone (NH)	1	4	0	0.02%	0.07%	0.00%
Other race alone (NH)	0	6	17	0.00%	0.10%	0.27%
Mixed race or Multiracial (NH)	41	43	201	0.80%	0.72%	3.19%
Hispanic or Latino (any race)	127	283	382	2.48%	4.73%	6.05%
Total	5,124	5,989	6,309	100.00%	100.00%	100.00%

=== 2020 census ===
As of the 2020 census, Twin Lakes had a population of 6,309. The median age was 41.7 years. 22.0% of residents were under the age of 18 and 16.0% of residents were 65 years of age or older. For every 100 females there were 99.9 males, and for every 100 females age 18 and over there were 98.2 males age 18 and over.

95.1% of residents lived in urban areas, while 4.9% lived in rural areas.

There were 2,555 households in Twin Lakes, of which 29.7% had children under the age of 18 living in them. Of all households, 49.8% were married-couple households, 18.0% were households with a male householder and no spouse or partner present, and 22.5% were households with a female householder and no spouse or partner present. About 26.4% of all households were made up of individuals and 10.1% had someone living alone who was 65 years of age or older.

There were 3,424 housing units, of which 25.4% were vacant. The homeowner vacancy rate was 1.5% and the rental vacancy rate was 3.3%.

=== 2010 census ===
As of the census of 2010, there were 5,989 people, 2,345 households, and 1,618 families living in the village. The population density was 732.2 inhabitants per square mile (282.7/km^{2}). There were 3,251 housing units at an average density of 397.4 per square mile (153.4/km^{2}). The racial makeup of the village was 96.2% White, 0.6% African American, 0.2% Native American, 0.4% Asian, 0.1% Pacific Islander, 1.4% from other races, and 1.1% from two or more races. Hispanic or Latino of any race were 4.7% of the population.

There were 2,345 households, of which 33.0% had children under the age of 18 living with them, 52.2% were married couples living together, 10.8% had a female householder with no husband present, 6.1% had a male householder with no wife present, and 31.0% were non-families. 24.4% of all households were made up of individuals, and 8.6% had someone living alone who was 65 years of age or older. The average household size was 2.55 and the average family size was 3.04.

The median age in the village was 38.9 years. 24.7% of residents were under the age of 18; 7.8% were between the ages of 18 and 24; 27.1% were from 25 to 44; 29.2% were from 45 to 64; and 11.4% were 65 years of age or older. The gender makeup of the village was 50.3% male and 49.7% female.

=== 2000 census ===
As of the census of 2000, there were 5,124 people, 1,973 households, and 1,390 families living in the village. The population density was 948.5 inhabitants per square mile (366.2/km^{2}). There were 2,742 housing units at an average density of 507.6 per square mile (196.0/km^{2}). The racial makeup of the village was 97.35% White, 0.37% African American, 0.18% Native American, 0.57% Asian, 0.02% Pacific Islander, 0.57% from other races, and 0.96% from two or more races. Hispanic or Latino of any race were 2.48% of the population.

There were 1,973 households, out of which 35.1% had children under the age of 18 living with them, 58.0% were married couples living together, 8.3% had a female householder with no husband present, and 29.5% were non-families. 22.8% of all households were made up of individuals, and 8.3% had someone living alone who was 65 years of age or older. The average household size was 2.58 and the average family size was 3.05.

In the village, the population was spread out, with 27.1% under the age of 18, 7.3% from 18 to 24, 30.3% from 25 to 44, 23.1% from 45 to 64, and 12.2% who were 65 years of age or older. The median age was 36 years. For every 100 females, there were 98.8 males. For every 100 females age 18 and over, there were 97.8 males.

The median income for a household in the village was $46,601, and the median income for a family was $54,583. Males had a median income of $42,589 versus $27,395 for females. The per capita income for the village was $22,226. About 4.5% of families and 6.6% of the population were below the poverty line, including 7.8% of those under age 18 and 9.2% of those age 65 or over.

== In popular culture ==
Twin Lakes was the inspiration and setting for the song, "Lake Marie," by singer-songwriter John Prine.

Twin Lakes is home to popular country music festival, Country Thunder
