= Paddock Lake, Wisconsin =

- Village
- Location of Paddock Lake in Kenosha County, Wisconsin.
- Coordinates: 42°34′27″N 88°6′19″W
- Country: United States
- State: Wisconsin
- County: Kenosha
- Incorporated: June 6, 1960

Area
  - Total: 3.11 sq mi (8.05 km^{2})
  - Land: 2.90 sq mi (7.51 km^{2})
  - Water: 0.21 sq mi (0.54 km^{2})
- Elevation: 817 ft (249 m)

Population (2020)
  - Total: 2,919
  - Density: 1,074.5/sq mi (414.87/km^{2})
- Demonym: Paddock Laker
- Time zone: UTC-6 (Central (CST))
  - Summer (DST): UTC-5 (CDT)
- Area code: 262
- FIPS code: 55-60975
- GNIS feature ID: 1570989
- Website: www.paddocklake.net

Paddock Lake is a village in Kenosha County, Wisconsin, United States. The population was 2,919 at the 2020 census.

== Geography ==
Paddock Lake is located at 42°34′27″N 88°6′19″W (42.574094, -88.105210).

According to the United States Census Bureau, the village has a total area of 3.10 square miles (8.03 km^{2}), of which 2.86 square miles (7.41 km^{2}) is land and 0.24 square miles (0.62 km^{2}) is water.

== Demographics ==
Historical population
Census	Pop.	Note	%±
1970	1,470		—
1980	2,207		50.1%
1990	2,662		20.6%
2000	3,012		13.1%
2010	2,992		−0.7%
2020	2,919		−2.4%
U.S. Decennial Census

=== 2020 census ===
Paddock Lake village, Wisconsin – Racial and ethnic composition Note: the US Census treats Hispanic/Latino as an ethnic category. This table excludes Latinos from the racial categories and assigns them to a separate category. Hispanics/Latinos may be of any race.
Race / Ethnicity (NH = Non-Hispanic)	Pop 2000	Pop 2010	Pop 2020	% 2000	% 2010	% 2020
White alone (NH)	2,815	2,765	2,574	93.46%	92.41%	88.18%
Black or African American alone (NH)	8	12	11	0.27%	0.40%	0.38%
Native American or Alaska Native alone (NH)	5	8	8	0.17%	0.27%	0.27%
Asian alone (NH)	21	10	17	0.70%	0.33%	0.58%
Native Hawaiian or Pacific Islander alone (NH)	1	2	0	0.03%	0.07%	0.00%
Other race alone (NH)	2	3	12	0.07%	0.10%	0.41%
Mixed race or Multiracial (NH)	25	35	109	0.83%	1.17%	3.73%
Hispanic or Latino (any race)	135	157	188	4.48%	5.25%	6.44%
Total	3,012	2,992	2,919	100.00%	100.00%	100.00%

=== 2010 census ===
As of the census of 2010, there were 2,992 people, 1,125 households, and 831 families living in the village. The population density was 1,046.2 inhabitants per square mile (403.9/km^{2}). There were 1,297 housing units at an average density of 453.5 per square mile (175.1/km^{2}). The racial makeup of the village was 95.5% White, 0.5% African American, 0.5% Native American, 0.3% Asian, 0.1% Pacific Islander, 1.4% from other races, and 1.7% from two or more races. Hispanic or Latino of any race were 5.2% of the population.

There were 1,125 households, of which 37.2% had children under the age of 18 living with them, 56.1% were married couples living together, 11.1% had a female householder with no husband present, 6.7% had a male householder with no wife present, and 26.1% were non-families. 20.5% of all households were made up of individuals, and 6.5% had someone living alone who was 65 years of age or older. The average household size was 2.66 and the average family size was 3.06.

The median age in the village was 37.8 years. 24.7% of residents were under the age of 18; 9.1% were between the ages of 18 and 24; 27.6% were from 25 to 44; 30.4% were from 45 to 64; and 8.4% were 65 years of age or older. The gender makeup of the village was 50.3% male and 49.7% female.

=== 2000 census ===
As of the census of 2000, there were 3,012 people, 1,056 households, and 803 families living in the village. The population density was 1,539.9 inhabitants per square mile (594.6/km^{2}). There were 1,185 housing units at an average density of 605.8 per square mile (233.9/km^{2}). The racial makeup of the village was 96.85% White, 0.40% African American, 0.17% Native American, 0.70% Asian, 0.03% Pacific Islander, 0.93% from other races, and 0.93% from two or more races. Hispanic or Latino of any race were 4.48% of the population.

There were 1,056 households, out of which 42.3% had children under the age of 18 living with them, 60.7% were married couples living together, 10.7% had a female householder with no husband present, and 23.9% were non-families. 17.9% of all households were made up of individuals, and 6.1% had someone living alone who was 65 years of age or older. The average household size was 2.84 and the average family size was 3.24.

In the village, the population was spread out, with 29.9% under the age of 18, 7.9% from 18 to 24, 33.7% from 25 to 44, 20.6% from 45 to 64, and 8.0% who were 65 years of age or older. The median age was 34 years. For every 100 females, there were 105.2 males. For every 100 females age 18 and over, there were 102.2 males.

The median income for a household in the village was $53,382, and the median income for a family was $60,216. Males had a median income of $40,757 versus $28,229 for females. The per capita income for the village was $20,621. About 0.7% of families and 1.5% of the population were below the poverty line, including none of those under age 18 and 2.5% of those age 65 or over.

== Education ==
Paddock Lake is the home of the regional high school, Westosha Central High School.

== Notable people ==
- The village was named after Dr. Francis Paddock.
