= Kenosha County, Wisconsin =

County in Wisconsin, United States

- County
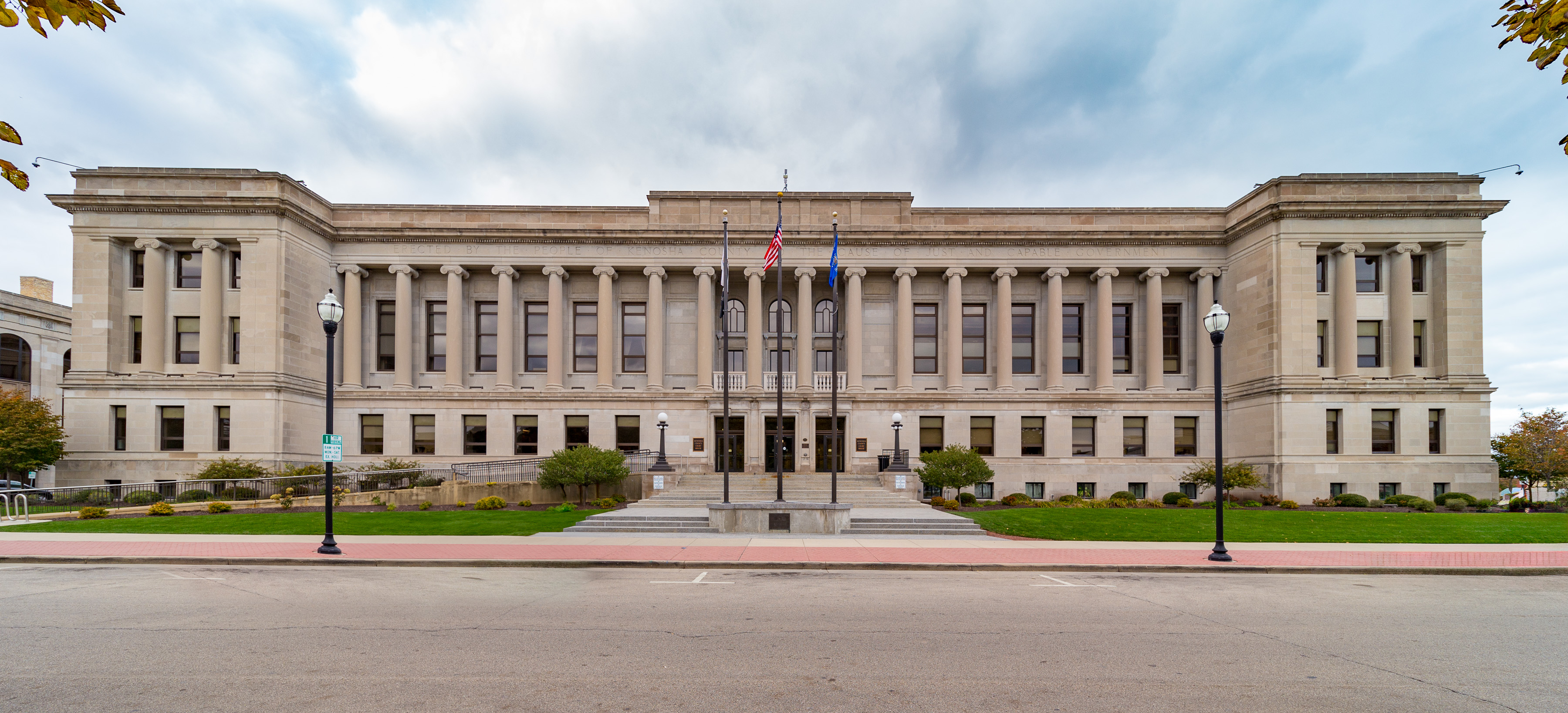
- The Kenosha County Courthouse and Jail in Kenosha

- Location within the U.S. state of Wisconsin
- Coordinates: 42.587526°N 87.879996°W
- Country: United States
- State: Wisconsin
- Founded: January 30, 1850
- Seat: Kenosha
- Largest city: Kenosha

Area
  - Total: 754.025 sq mi (1,952.92 km^{2})
  - Land: 271.833 sq mi (704.04 km^{2})
  - Water: 482.192 sq mi (1,248.87 km^{2}) 63.95%

Population (2020)
  - Total: 169,151
  - Estimate (2025): 168,448 ▼
  - Density: 92.549/sq mi (35.733/km^{2})
- Time zone: UTC−6 (Central)
  - Summer (DST): UTC−5 (CDT)
- Area code: 262
- Congressional district: 1st
- Website: kenoshacountywi.gov

Kenosha County (/kəˈnoʊʃə/) is located in the southeastern corner of the U.S. state of Wisconsin. As of the 2020 census, the population was 169,151, and was estimated to be 168,448 in 2025, making it the eighth-most populous county in Wisconsin. Its county seat and the largest city is Kenosha, the fourth-largest city in Wisconsin.

Kenosha County is situated on the southwestern shore of Lake Michigan. It is part of the Kenosha, WI Metropolitan Statistical Area and the Chicago–Naperville, IL–IN–WI Combined Statistical Area. The county has a direct rail link to Chicago via Metra's Union Pacific North Line. In 2022, Kenosha County was ranked 16th out of 72 Wisconsin counties for tourism revenue, at $424 million in 2022.

== History ==
The Potowatomi inhabited the area that would become Kenosha County for centuries prior to the acquisition of the area in 1833. The city of Kenosha was founded in 1835, and Kenosha County was formed from Racine County on January 30, 1850. Its location led to development and factories being built in the 19th century. Manufacturing continued to be a key component of the economy into the 20th century.

== Geography ==
According to the United States Census Bureau, the county has a total area of 754.025 square miles (1,952.92 km^{2}), of which 271.833 square miles (704.04 km^{2}) is land and 482.192 square miles (1,248.87 km^{2}) (63.95%) is water. It is the 69th largest county in Wisconsin by total area (fourth-smallest county). Although the county contains area from Lake Michigan.

=== Major highways ===
- Interstate 41
- Interstate 94
- U.S. Highway 41 (Skokie Highway)
- U.S. Highway 45
- Highway 31 (Wisconsin)
- Highway 32 (Wisconsin)
- Highway 50 (Wisconsin)
- Highway 75 (Wisconsin)
- Highway 83 (Wisconsin)
- Highway 142 (Wisconsin)
- Highway 158 (Wisconsin)
- Highway 165 (Wisconsin)

=== Railroads ===
- Canadian National
- Canadian Pacific
- Metra
- Union Pacific
- Kenosha station
- Kenosha Streetcar

=== Buses ===
- Kenosha Area Transit
- Jefferson Lines

=== Airport ===
Kenosha Regional Airport (KENW) serves the county and surrounding communities.

=== Adjacent counties ===
- Racine County (north)
- Allegan County, Michigan (east across Lake Michigan)
- Lake County, Illinois (south)
- McHenry County, Illinois (southwest)
- Van Buren County, Michigan (southeast)
- Walworth County (west)

== Demographics ==
Historical population
Census	Pop.	Note	%±
1850	10,734		—
1860	13,900		29.5%
1870	13,147		−5.4%
1880	13,550		3.1%
1890	15,581		15.0%
1900	21,707		39.3%
1910	32,929		51.7%
1920	51,284		55.7%
1930	63,277		23.4%
1940	63,505		0.4%
1950	75,238		18.5%
1960	100,615		33.7%
1970	117,917		17.2%
1980	123,137		4.4%
1990	128,181		4.1%
2000	149,577		16.7%
2010	166,426		11.3%
2020	169,151		1.6%
2025 (est.)	168,448	▼	−0.4%
U.S. Decennial Census; 1790–1960 1900–1990; 1980 1990 2000 2010–2020

As of the third quarter of 2024, the median home value in Kenosha County was $284,600.

As of the 2023 American Community Survey, there are 67,631 estimated households in Kenosha County with an average of 2.43 persons per household. The county has a median household income of $79,412. Approximately 11.3% of the county's population lives at or below the poverty line. Kenosha County has an estimated 67.0% employment rate, with 30.8% of the population holding a bachelor's degree or higher and 95.0% holding a high school diploma.

The top five reported ancestries (people were allowed to report up to two ancestries, thus the figures will generally add to more than 100%) were English (85.8%), Spanish (9.5%), Indo-European (3.3%), Asian and Pacific Islander (0.9%), and Other (0.5%).

=== Racial and ethnic composition ===
Kenosha County, Wisconsin – Racial and ethnic composition Note: the US Census treats Hispanic/Latino as an ethnic category. This table excludes Latinos from the racial categories and assigns them to a separate category. Hispanics/Latinos may be of any race.
Race / ethnicity (NH = Non-Hispanic)	Pop 1980	Pop 1990	Pop 2000	Pop 2010	Pop 2020	% 1980	% 1990	% 2000	% 2010	% 2020
White alone (NH)	115,691	116,223	127,287	129,892	121,936	93.95%	90.71%	85.10%	78.08%	72.09%
Black or African American alone (NH)	2,850	5,190	7,446	10,655	11,480	2.31%	4.05%	4.98%	6.40%	6.79%
Native American or Alaska Native alone (NH)	349	443	491	513	371	0.32%	0.35%	0.33%	0.31%	0.22%
Asian alone (NH)	401	648	1,350	2,343	2,793	0.33%	0.51%	0.90%	1.41%	1.65%
Native Hawaiian or Pacific Islander alone (NH)	7	24	53	67	67	0.01%	0.02%	0.04%	0.04%	0.04%
Other race alone (NH)	268	267	160	177	528	0.22%	0.01%	0.11%	0.11%	0.31%
Mixed race or Multiracial (NH)	x	x	2,033	3,187	7,430	x	x	1.36%	1.91%	4.39%
Hispanic or Latino (any race)	3,578	5,580	10,757	19,592	24,546	2.91%	4.36%	7.19%	11.77%	14.51%
Total	123,137	128,121	149,577	166,426	169,151	100.00%	100.00%	100.00%	100.00%	100.00%

=== 2023 estimate ===
As of the 2023 estimate, there were 167,488 people and 67,631 households residing in the county. There were 73,786 housing units. The racial makeup of the county was 86.3% White (72.8% NH White), 7.7% African American, 0.8% Native American, 2.0% Asian, 0.1% Pacific Islander, _% from some other races and 3.1% from two or more races. Hispanic or Latino people of any race were 15.4% of the population.

=== 2020 census ===
As of the 2020 census, there were 169,151 people, 66,842 households, and 42,891 families residing in the county. The population density was 622.3 inhabitants per square mile (240.3/km^{2}). There were 72,451 housing units at an average density of 266.5 per square mile (102.9/km^{2}).

The median age was 39.0 years; 22.3% of residents were under the age of 18 and 15.2% of residents were 65 years of age or older. For every 100 females there were 97.3 males, and for every 100 females age 18 and over there were 95.1 males age 18 and over.

There were 66,842 households in the county, of which 30.0% had children under the age of 18 living in them. Of all households, 45.2% were married-couple households, 19.1% were households with a male householder and no spouse or partner present, and 27.2% were households with a female householder and no spouse or partner present. About 28.8% of all households were made up of individuals and 11.4% had someone living alone who was 65 years of age or older. Of the 72,451 housing units, 7.7% were vacant. Among occupied housing units, 65.2% were owner-occupied and 34.8% were renter-occupied. The homeowner vacancy rate was 1.2% and the rental vacancy rate was 6.2%.

The racial makeup of the county was 75.9% White, 7.1% Black or African American, 0.4% American Indian and Alaska Native, 1.7% Asian, 0.1% Native Hawaiian and Pacific Islander, 5.2% from some other race, and 9.5% from two or more races. Hispanic or Latino residents of any race comprised 14.5% of the population.

86.9% of residents lived in urban areas, while 13.1% lived in rural areas.

=== 2010 census ===
As of the 2010 census, there were 166,426 people, 62,650 households, and _ families residing in the county. The population density was 611.9 inhabitants per square mile (236.3/km^{2}). There were 69,288 housing units at an average density of 254.7 per square mile (98.3/km^{2}). The racial makeup of the county was 83.77% White, 6.64% African American, 0.49% Native American, 1.44% Asian, 0.05% Pacific Islander, 4.73% from some other races and 2.87% from two or more races. Hispanic or Latino people of any race were 11.77% of the population.

=== 2000 census ===
2000 Census Age Pyramid for Kenosha County

As of the 2000 census, there were 149,577 people, 56,057 households, and 38,455 families residing in the county. The population density was 548.0 inhabitants per square mile (211.6/km^{2}). There were 59,989 housing units at an average density of 220.0 per square mile (84.9/km^{2}). The racial makeup of the county was 88.38% White, 5.08% African American, 0.38% Native American, 0.92% Asian, 0.04% Pacific Islander, 3.29% from some other races and 1.91% from two or more races. Hispanic or Latino people of any race were 7.19% of the population.

In terms of ancestry, 28.8% were of German, 10.4% Italian, 7.9% Irish, 7.6% Polish and 7.5% English.

There were 56,057 households, out of which 34.80% had children under the age of 18 living with them, 52.70% were married couples living together, 11.50% had a female householder with no husband present, and 31.40% were non-families. 25.50% of all households were made up of individuals, and 9.10% had someone living alone who was 65 years of age or older. The average household size was 2.60 and the average family size was 3.13.

In the county, the population was spread out, with 27.10% under the age of 18, 9.40% from 18 to 24, 31.30% from 25 to 44, 20.70% from 45 to 64, and 11.50% who were 65 years of age or older. The median age was 35 years. For every 100 females, there were 98.30 males. For every 100 females age 18 and over, there were 95.30 males.

== Government ==
The county legislature is known as the Board of Supervisors. It consists of 23 members, each elected from single-member districts. The county executive is elected in a spring countywide, nonpartisan vote. The county executive is Samantha Kerkman. The district attorney, treasurer, clerk, and register of deeds are elected in fall countywide, partisan elections held in presidential years, while the sheriff and clerk of circuit court are elected in fall countywide, partisan elections held in gubernatorial years.

== Politics ==
In presidential elections, Kenosha County has voted Democratic for most of the past century. In 2016, Donald Trump became the first Republican presidential candidate to win the county since President Nixon in 1972. In 2020 and 2024, Trump was able to gain more of the vote share with 2024 being the highest share for a Republican since 1972.

United States presidential election results for Kenosha County, Wisconsin
Year	Republican		Democratic		Third party(ies)	
Year	No.	%	No.	%	No.	%
1892	1,628	44.71%	1,928	52.95%	85	2.33%
1896	2,827	60.54%	1,732	37.09%	111	2.38%
1900	3,078	58.37%	2,101	39.84%	94	1.78%
1904	3,293	60.86%	1,592	29.42%	526	9.72%
1908	3,409	54.50%	2,006	32.07%	840	13.43%
1912	1,671	27.21%	2,216	36.09%	2,254	36.70%
1916	3,537	50.99%	2,813	40.55%	587	8.46%
1920	9,791	77.81%	1,724	13.70%	1,069	8.49%
1924	10,341	55.45%	1,517	8.13%	6,791	36.41%
1928	11,330	50.66%	10,638	47.57%	395	1.77%
1932	7,307	30.57%	14,373	60.13%	2,223	9.30%
1936	7,268	26.68%	18,137	66.57%	1,840	6.75%
1940	12,182	40.91%	17,174	57.68%	421	1.41%
1944	12,436	39.96%	18,325	58.88%	360	1.16%
1948	12,780	39.80%	17,987	56.02%	1,342	4.18%
1952	18,917	48.72%	19,768	50.91%	142	0.37%
1956	21,367	55.08%	17,094	44.06%	335	0.86%
1960	19,969	46.43%	22,956	53.37%	86	0.20%
1964	14,764	32.55%	30,522	67.29%	70	0.15%
1968	17,089	40.57%	21,427	50.86%	3,610	8.57%
1972	24,041	53.93%	19,441	43.61%	1,094	2.45%
1976	22,349	43.61%	27,585	53.82%	1,316	2.57%
1980	24,481	43.82%	26,738	47.86%	4,644	8.31%
1984	26,118	46.89%	29,233	52.49%	344	0.62%
1988	21,661	41.55%	30,089	57.72%	379	0.73%
1992	19,854	32.11%	27,341	44.21%	14,642	23.68%
1996	18,296	34.06%	27,964	52.06%	7,457	13.88%
2000	28,891	45.35%	32,429	50.90%	2,389	3.75%
2004	35,587	46.56%	40,107	52.48%	734	0.96%
2008	31,609	40.12%	45,836	58.18%	1,344	1.71%
2012	34,977	43.24%	44,867	55.46%	1,053	1.30%
2016	36,037	47.23%	35,799	46.92%	4,468	5.86%
2020	44,972	50.68%	42,193	47.55%	1,573	1.77%
2024	47,478	52.36%	41,826	46.12%	1,376	1.52%

== Education ==
=== Libraries ===
Library services are provided by the Kenosha County Library System (KCLS), comprising the Kenosha Public Library (KPL), serving the city of Kenosha and the village of Pleasant Prairie, and the Community Library, which serves the town of Randall and the villages of Paddock Lake, Salem Lakes, and Twin Lakes.

== Communities ==
=== City ===
- Kenosha (county seat)

=== Villages ===
- Bristol
- Genoa City (mostly in Walworth County)
- Paddock Lake
- Pleasant Prairie
- Salem Lakes
- Somers
- Twin Lakes

=== Towns ===
- Brighton
- Paris
- Randall
- Somers
- Wheatland

=== Census-designated places ===
- Lily Lake
- New Munster
- Powers Lake

=== Unincorporated communities ===
- Bassett
- Benet Lake
- Brighton
- Camp Lake
- Chapin
- Cross Lake
- Fox River
- Klondike
- Lake Shangrila
- Liberty Corners
- Paris
- Salem
- Salem Oaks
- Slades Corners
- Trevor
- Truesdell
- Voltz Lake
- Wilmot

=== Ghost towns/neighborhoods ===
- Aurora

== See also ==
- National Register of Historic Places listings in Kenosha County, Wisconsin
