= Area code 262 =

Area code in southeastern Wisconsin

Coordinates: 43°00′N 88°15′W

Map of Wisconsin's numbering plan areas and area codes

Area code 262 is a telephone area code in the North American Numbering Plan for the southeastern part of the U.S. state of Wisconsin. The numbering plan area comprises suburbs that are a part of the Milwaukee and Chicago metropolitan areas. The area code was created on September 25, 1999, in an area code split of area code 414.

== History ==
The eastern portion of Wisconsin had been served by area code 414 for half a century until the Green Bay and the Fox River Valley were designated a new numbering plan area (NPA) with area code 920 in 1997, to provide more telephone numbers in the densest populated area of Milwaukee County. Although this was intended as a long-term solution, within a year 414 was again approaching exhaustion due to the continued proliferation of cell phones and pagers. The original mitigation plans called for 262 to be added as an overlay code for all of southeastern Wisconsin. However, overlays were a new concept at the time, and met with some resistance to the mixing of area codes in the same area and the ensuing requirement for ten-digit dialing. As a result, 262 was designated for a separate numbering plan area with nearly all of the territory outside Milwaukee County. A few slivers of Waukesha and Washington counties stayed in 414.

Projections in early 2019 suggested the Milwaukee suburbs would not need another area code until 2044 at the earliest, but later in 2019 no exhaust date was listed, meaning the date is 30 years or more in the future.

Prior to October 2021, area code 262 had telephone numbers assigned for the central office code 988. In 2020, 988 was designated nationwide as a dialing code for the National Suicide Prevention Lifeline, which created a conflict for exchanges that permit seven-digit dialing. This area code was therefore scheduled to transition to ten-digit dialing by October 24, 2021.

== Service area ==
The area code serves the following six counties:

Kenosha, Ozaukee, Racine, Walworth, Washington (shared with 414), and Waukesha (shared with 414). Kenosha County and all its cities are part of the Chicago metropolitan area while the cities in the other counties are part of the Milwaukee metropolitan area.

These counties include the municipalities of

Allenton, Auburn, Bassett, Belgium, Benet Lake, Big Bend, Bristol, Brookfield, Burlington, Butler, Caledonia, Camp Lake, Cedarburg, Colgate, Darien, Delafield, Delavan, Dousman, Eagle, East Troy, Elkhorn, Elm Grove, Erin, Fontana, Franksville, Fredonia, Genesee Depot, Genoa City, Germantown, Grafton, Hartford, Hartland, Honey Creek, Hubertus, Jackson, Kansasville, Kenosha, Kewaskum, Lake Geneva, Lannon, Lyons, Menomonee Falls, Mequon, Merton, Mount Pleasant, Mukwonago, Muskego, Nashotah, New Berlin, New Munster, Newburg, North Lake, North Prairie, Oconomowoc, Okauchee, Paddock Lake, Pell Lake, Pewaukee, Pleasant Prairie, Port Washington, Powers Lake, Racine, Richfield, Rochester, Salem, Saukville, Sharon, Silver Lake, Slinger, Somers, Springfield, Stone Bank, Sturtevant, Sullivan, Sussex, Thiensville, Trevor, Twin Lakes, Union Grove, Vernon, Wales, Walworth, Waterford, Waukesha, West Bend, Whitewater, Williams Bay, Wilmot, and Zenda.

== See also ==
- List of North American Numbering Plan area codes
- List of Wisconsin area codes

Wisconsin area codes: 262, 414, 608/353, 715/534, 920/274
	North: 920/274	
West: 353/608, 920/274	262	East: 414, Lake Michigan, 231, 269,
	South: 847/224, 815/779	
Illinois area codes: 217/447, 309/861, 312, 630/331, 618/730, 708/464, 773, 815/779, 847/224, 872
Michigan area codes: 231, 248/947, 269, 313/679, 517, 586, 616, 734, 810, 906, 989
