= 32nd Wisconsin Legislature =

Wisconsin legislative term for 1879

←	31st	33rd	→
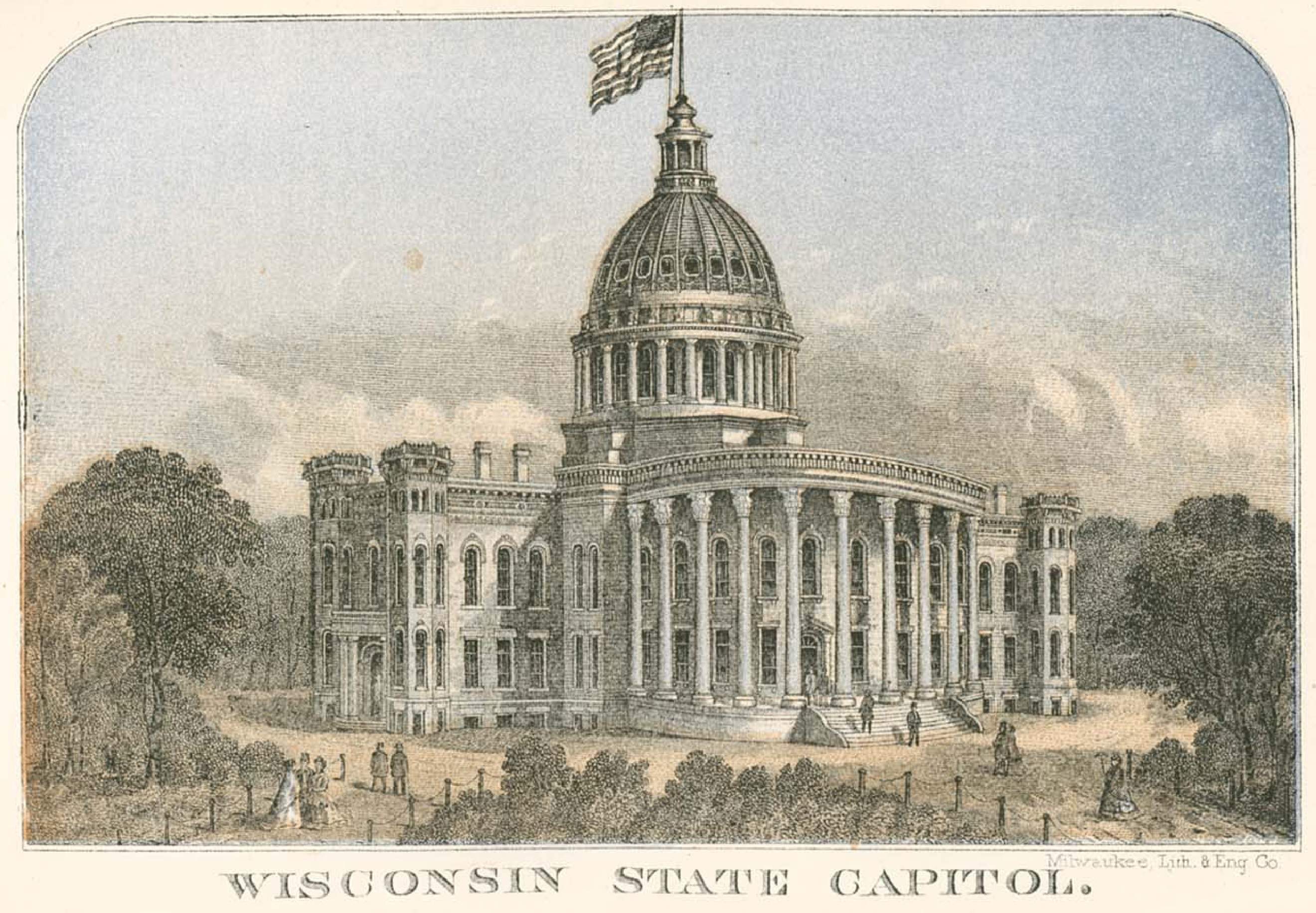
- Wisconsin State Capitol, 1863

Overview
- Legislative body: Wisconsin Legislature
- Meeting place: Wisconsin State Capitol
- Term: January 6, 1879 – January 5, 1880
- Election: November 5, 1878

Senate
- Members: 33
- Senate President: James M. Bingham (R)
- President pro tempore: William T. Price (R)
- Party control: Republican

Assembly
- Members: 100
- Assembly Speaker: David M. Kelly (R)
- Party control: Republican

Sessions
- 1st: January 8, 1879 – March 5, 1879

The Thirty-Second Wisconsin Legislature convened from January 8, 1879, to March 5, 1879, in regular session.

Senators representing odd-numbered districts were newly elected for this session and were serving the first year of a two-year term. Assembly members were elected to a one-year term. Assembly members and odd-numbered senators were elected in the general election of November 5, 1878. Senators representing even-numbered districts were serving the second year of their two-year term, having been elected in the general election held on November 6, 1877.

The governor of Wisconsin during this entire term was Republican William E. Smith, of Milwaukee County, serving the second year of a two-year term, having won election in the 1877 Wisconsin gubernatorial election.

== Major events ==
- January 22, 1879: Matthew H. Carpenter elected United States Senator by the Wisconsin Legislature in Joint Session.
- November 4, 1879: William E. Smith re-elected as Governor of Wisconsin.

== Major legislation ==
- February 28, 1879: An Act to secure to children the benefits of an elementary education, 1879 Act 121. Created a legal requirement for parents and legal guardians to send their children to school for at least one semester per year between the ages of 7 and 15.

== Party summary ==
=== Senate summary ===
Senate partisan composition Democratic: 9 seats Republican: 24 seats

	Party (Shading indicates majority caucus)			Total	
	Dem.	Lib.R.	Rep.	Total	Vacant
End of previous Legislature	10	2	21	33	0
start of 1st Session (Note: Republican Charles H. Phillips (District 23) died January 1, 1879.)	9	0	23	32	1
from Jan. 27 (Note: Republican Joseph B. Bennett (District 23) replaced Charles H. Phillips.)	9	0	24	33	9
Final voting share	27.27%		72.73%		
Beginning of the next Legislature	8	0	25	33	0

=== Assembly summary ===
Assembly partisan composition Democratic: 25 seats Greenback: 9 seats Republican: 66 seats

	Party (Shading indicates majority caucus)				Total	
	Dem.	Soc.	Gbk.	Rep.	Total	Vacant
End of previous Legislature	41	1	13	45	100	0
1st Session	25	0	9	66	100	0
Final voting share	34%			66%		
Beginning of the next Legislature	28	0	2	70	100	0

== Sessions ==
- 1st Regular session: January 8, 1879 – March 5, 1879

== Leaders ==
=== Senate leadership ===
- President of the Senate: James M. Bingham (R)
- President pro tempore: William T. Price (R)

=== Assembly leadership ===
- Speaker of the Assembly: David M. Kelly (R)

== Members ==
=== Members of the Senate ===
Members of the Senate for the Thirty-Second Wisconsin Legislature:

Senate partisan representation Democratic: 9 seats Republican: 24 seats

Dist.	Counties	Senator	Residence	Party
01	Door, Kewaunee, Oconto, & Shawano	George Grimmer	Kewaunee	Rep.
02	Brown	Thomas R. Hudd	Green Bay	Dem.
03	Racine	William E. Chipman	Burlington	Rep.
04	Crawford & Vernon	George W. Swain	Chaseburg	Rep.
05	Milwaukee (Northern Part)	Isaac W. Van Schaick	Milwaukee	Rep.
06	Milwaukee (Southern Part)	George H. Paul	Milwaukee	Dem.
07	Milwaukee (Central Part)	Edwin Hyde	Milwaukee	Rep.
08	Kenosha & Walworth	Benoni Reynolds	Geneva	Rep.
09	Green Lake, Marquette, & Waushara	Hobart S. Sacket	Berlin	Rep.
10	Waukesha	John A. Rice	Merton	Dem.
11	Chippewa, Clark, Lincoln, Taylor, & Wood	Thomas B. Scott	Grand Rapids	Rep.
12	Green & Lafayette	Joseph B. Treat	Monroe	Rep.
13	Dodge	Edward C. McFetridge	Beaver Dam	Rep.
14	Juneau & Sauk	David E. Welch	Baraboo	Rep.
15	Manitowoc	Joseph Rankin	Manitowoc	Dem.
16	Grant	Oscar C. Hathaway	Beetown	Rep.
17	Rock	Hamilton Richardson	Janesville	Rep.
18	Fond du Lac (Western Part)	Alonzo A. Loper	Ripon	Rep.
19	Winnebago	Andrew Haben	Oshkosh	Dem.
20	Sheboygan & Eastern Fond du Lac	Louis Wolf	Sheboygan Falls	Dem.
21	Marathon, Portage, & Waupaca	John A. Kellogg	Wausau	Rep.
22	Calumet & Outagamie	George N. Richmond	Appleton	Dem.
23	Jefferson	Charles H. Phillips (died Jan. 1, 1879)	Lake Mills	Rep.
23	Jefferson	Joseph B. Bennett (from Jan. 27, 1879)	Watertown	Rep.
24	Ashland, Barron, Bayfield, Burnett, Douglas, Polk, & St. Croix	Dana Reed Bailey	Baldwin	Rep.
25	Dane (Eastern Part)	George B. Burrows	Madison	Rep.
26	Dane (Western Part)	Matthew Anderson	Cross Plains	Dem.
27	Adams & Columbia	Charles L. Dering	Columbus	Rep.
28	Iowa & Richland	Archibald Campbell	Middlebury	Rep.
29	Buffalo, Pepin, & Trempealeau	Horace E. Houghton	Durand	Rep.
30	Dunn, Eau Claire, & Pierce	Abraham D. Andrews	River Falls	Rep.
31	La Crosse	Gysbert Van Steenwyk	La Crosse	Rep.
32	Jackson & Monroe	William T. Price	Black River Falls	Rep.
33	Ozaukee & Washington	Lyman Morgan	Port Washington	Dem.

=== Members of the Assembly ===
Members of the Assembly for the Thirty-Second Wisconsin Legislature:

Assembly partisan composition Democratic: 25 seats Greenback: 9 seats Republican: 66 seats

Senate District	County	Dist.	Representative	Party	Residence
27	Adams		Charles A. Cady	Rep.	Dell Prairie
24	Ashland, Barron, Bayfield, Burnett, Douglas, & Polk		William J. Vincent	Rep.	St. Croix Falls
02	Brown	1	David M. Kelly	Rep.	Green Bay
02	Brown	2	Albert L. Gray	Gbk.	Fort Howard
02	Brown	3	John O'Flaherty	Dem.	Morrison
29	Buffalo & Pepin	1	John W. DeGroff	Rep.	Alma
29	Buffalo & Pepin	2	James Barry	Rep.	Pepin
22	Calumet		Joseph B. Reynolds	Gbk.	Chilton
11	Chippewa		Hector McRae	Rep.	Chippewa Falls
11	Clark, Lincoln, Taylor & Wood		Niran Withee	Rep.	Neillsville
27	Columbia	1	Charles R. Gallett	Rep.	Portage
27	Columbia	2	John Sanderson	Rep.	Randolph
04	Crawford		Atley Peterson	Rep.	Soldiers Grove
26	Dane	1	Matthias Theisen	Dem.	Roxbury
25	Dane	2	Buel Hutchinson	Rep.	Madison
25	Dane	3	Charles G. Lewis	Rep.	Sun Prairie
13	Dodge	1	William Fleming	Dem.	Emmet
13	Dodge	2	Henry Spiering	Dem.	Mayville
13	Dodge	3	James Davison	Dem.	Chester
13	Dodge	4	William Geise	Dem.	Portland
01	Door		Charles A. Masse	Rep.	Sturgeon Bay
30	Dunn		Henry Ausman	Rep.	Elk Mound
30	Eau Claire		Julius Ingram	Rep.	Eau Claire
18	Fond du Lac	1	Henry C. Bottum	Rep.	West Rosendale
18	Fond du Lac	2	Philip Greening	Dem.	Lamartine
18	Fond du Lac	3	Thomas W. Spence	Rep.	Fond du Lac
20	Fond du Lac	4	Michael Thelen	Dem.	Ashford
16	Grant	1	William E. Carter	Rep.	Platteville
16	Grant	2	Joseph T. Mills	Rep.	Lancaster
16	Grant	3	John Brindley	Rep.	Boscobel
12	Green	1	Fordyce R. Melvin	Rep.	Brooklyn
12	Green	2	Franklin Mitchell	Rep.	Spring Grove
09	Green Lake		Samuel Barter	Rep.	Markesan
28	Iowa	1	George L. Frost	Gbk.	Dodgeville
28	Iowa	2	George G. Cox	Rep.	Mineral Point
32	Jackson		Frederick Condit	Gbk.	Merrillan
23	Jefferson	1	Hezekiah Flinn	Dem.	Watertown
23	Jefferson	2	John D. Bullock	Rep.	Johnson Creek
23	Jefferson	3	James W. Ostrander	Rep.	Jefferson
14	Juneau	1	James Mullowney	Dem.	Kildare
14	Juneau	2	Henry F. C. Nichols	Rep.	New Lisbon
08	Kenosha		Joseph V. Quarles	Rep.	Kenosha
01	Kewaunee		John Carel	Dem.	Kewaunee
31	La Crosse		John Bradley	Rep.	Bangor
11	Lafayette	1	Nelson La Due	Rep.	Spafford
11	Lafayette	2	John W. Blackstone	Rep.	Shullsburg
15	Manitowoc	1	John Carey	Dem.	Osman
15	Manitowoc	2	William Zander	Dem.	Larrabee
15	Manitowoc	3	William H. Hemschemeyer	Rep.	Manitowoc
21	Marathon		John Ringle	Dem.	Wausau
09	Marquette		James W. Murphy	Dem.	Briggsville
05	Milwaukee	1	Edward C. Wall	Dem.	Milwaukee
07	Milwaukee	2	Christian Widule	Rep.	Milwaukee
07	Milwaukee	3	Edward Keogh	Dem.	Milwaukee
07	Milwaukee	4	Edward B. Simpson	Rep.	Milwaukee
06	Milwaukee	5	John Bentley	Dem.	Milwaukee
05	Milwaukee	6	Christopher Raesser	Rep.	Milwaukee
07	Milwaukee	7	Anson Allen	Rep.	Milwaukee
06	Milwaukee	8	Henry P. Fischer	Rep.	Milwaukee
05	Milwaukee	9	Christian Sarnow	Rep.	Milwaukee
05	Milwaukee	10	Judson G. Hart	Rep.	Wauwatosa
06	Milwaukee	11	William W. Johnson	Rep.	Greenfield
32	Monroe	1	James D. Condit	Dem.	Sparta
32	Monroe	2	George R. Vincent	Gbk.	Tomah
01	Oconto & Shawano		Daniel H. Pulcifer	Rep.	Shawano
22	Outagamie	1	John C. Petersen	Gbk.	Appleton
22	Outagamie	2	Francis Steffen	Dem.	Hortonville
33	Ozaukee		William H. Fitzgerald	Ind.D.	Cedarburg
30	Pierce		Nils P. Haugen	Rep.	River Falls
21	Portage		Thomas McDill	Rep.	McDill
03	Racine	1	Norton J. Field	Rep.	Racine
03	Racine	2	Knud Adland	Rep.	North Cape
28	Richland	1	Joseph M. Thomas	Rep.	Lone Rock
28	Richland	2	Elihu Bailey	Rep.	Mill Creek
17	Rock	1	Richard Burdge	Rep.	Beloit
17	Rock	2	Allen P. Lovejoy	Rep.	Janesville
17	Rock	3	William Gardiner	Rep.	Emerald Grove
14	Sauk	1	Ulrich Hemmi	Rep.	Troy
14	Sauk	2	Alexander P. Ellinwood	Rep.	Reedsburg
20	Sheboygan	1	Wilbur M. Root	Dem.	Sheboygan
20	Sheboygan	2	La Fayette Eastman	Rep.	Plymouth
20	Sheboygan	3	James Allan Jr.	Rep.	Adell
24	St. Croix		James Hill	Rep.	Warren
29	Trempealeau		George H. Markham	Rep.	Independence
04	Vernon	1	Jacob Eckhardt	Rep.	De Soto
04	Vernon	2	Roger Williams	Rep.	Hillsboro
08	Walworth	1	Ely Bruce Dewing	Rep.	Elkhorn
08	Walworth	2	Albert L. Mason	Rep.	Elton
08	Walworth	3	Edwin D. Coe	Rep.	Whitewater
33	Washington	1	Jacob H. Muckerheide	Dem.	Kewaskum
33	Washington	2	John G. Frank	Dem.	Jackson
10	Waukesha	1	Alvarus E. Gilbert	Rep.	New Berlin
10	Waukesha	2	William H. Washburn	Rep.	Pewaukee
21	Waupaca	1	Lorenzo L. Post	Dem.	Weyauwega
21	Waupaca	2	John Scanlon	Gbk.	Union
09	Waushara		Samuel R. Clark	Rep.	Bloomfield
19	Winnebago	1	William Wall	Rep.	Oshkosh
19	Winnebago	2	John Potter Jr.	Gbk.	Menasha
19	Winnebago	3	Hiram W. Webster	Rep.	Omro
19	Winnebago	4	Milan Ford	Gbk.	Nekimi

== Employees ==
=== Senate employees ===
- Chief Clerk: Charles E. Bross
  - Assistant Clerk: W. S. Reynolds
  - Bookkeeper: T. S. Ansley
  - Engrossing Clerk: John P. Mitchell
  - Enrolling Clerk: A. J. Smith
  - Transcribing Clerk: Fred. Richards
  - Proofreader: Thomas A. Dyson
  - Clerk for the Judiciary Committee: H. M. Pierce
  - Clerk for the Committee on Claims: L. F. Nickey
  - Clerk for the Committee on Enrolled Bills: Walter L. Houser
- Sergeant-at-Arms: Chalmers Ingersoll
  - Assistant Sergeant-at-Arms: William A. Adamson
- Postmaster: O. N. Russell
  - Assistant Postmaster: A. C. Martin
- Gallery Attendant: O. A. Kluetz
  - Doc. Room Attendant: William Graham
- Doorkeepers:
  - E. T. Songstad
  - M. Simon
  - A. Knudson
  - John Halls
- Porter: John Redman
- Night Watch: Eugene A. Steer
- Chief Clerk's Messenger: J. G. Hyland
- President's Messenger: John Barrows
- Messengers:
  - Jos. Campbell
  - Jas. H. Welch
  - Harry M. Hathaway
  - Thos. Farness
  - Geo. Roe
  - Jos. J. Gunkel
  - Lono Loper
- Janitor: Ole Stevenson

=== Assembly employees ===
- Chief Clerk: John E. Eldred
  - 1st Assistant Clerk: William M. Fogo
    - 2nd Assistant Clerk: S. L. Perrine
  - Bookkeeper: O. A. Southmayd
  - Engrossing Clerk: T. J. Vaughn
  - Enrolling Clerk: Franklin S. Lawrence
  - Transcribing Clerk: F. W. Rogers
  - Proof Reader: H. O. Fifield
- Sergeant-at-Arms: Miletus Knight
  - Assistant Sergeant-at-Arms: William Seamonson
- Postmaster: J. J. Gibbs
  - Assistant Postmaster: William Stanton
- Doorkeepers:
  - J. J. Burnard
  - C. E. Webster
  - George B. McMillen
  - Fred Oelhafer
- Gallery Attendants:
  - R. Worts
  - J. L. Johnson
- Porter: C. Schneider
- Night Watch: N. V. Chandler
- Wash Room Attendant: J. W. Kildow
- Speaker's Messenger: E. H. Potter
- Clerk's Messenger: Arthur Truax
- Messengers:
  - William Post
  - John F. Sanderson
  - Richard Kempter
  - S. G. Bottum
  - Harvey Barlow
  - Candy Nicodemus
  - William Renkema
  - Eddie Kavenaugh
  - Julius Leison
  - B. F. Oakley
  - Bertie Carter
  - Freddie Wittl
  - Jake Gill
