= 33rd Wisconsin Legislature =

Wisconsin legislative term for 1880

←	32nd	34th	→
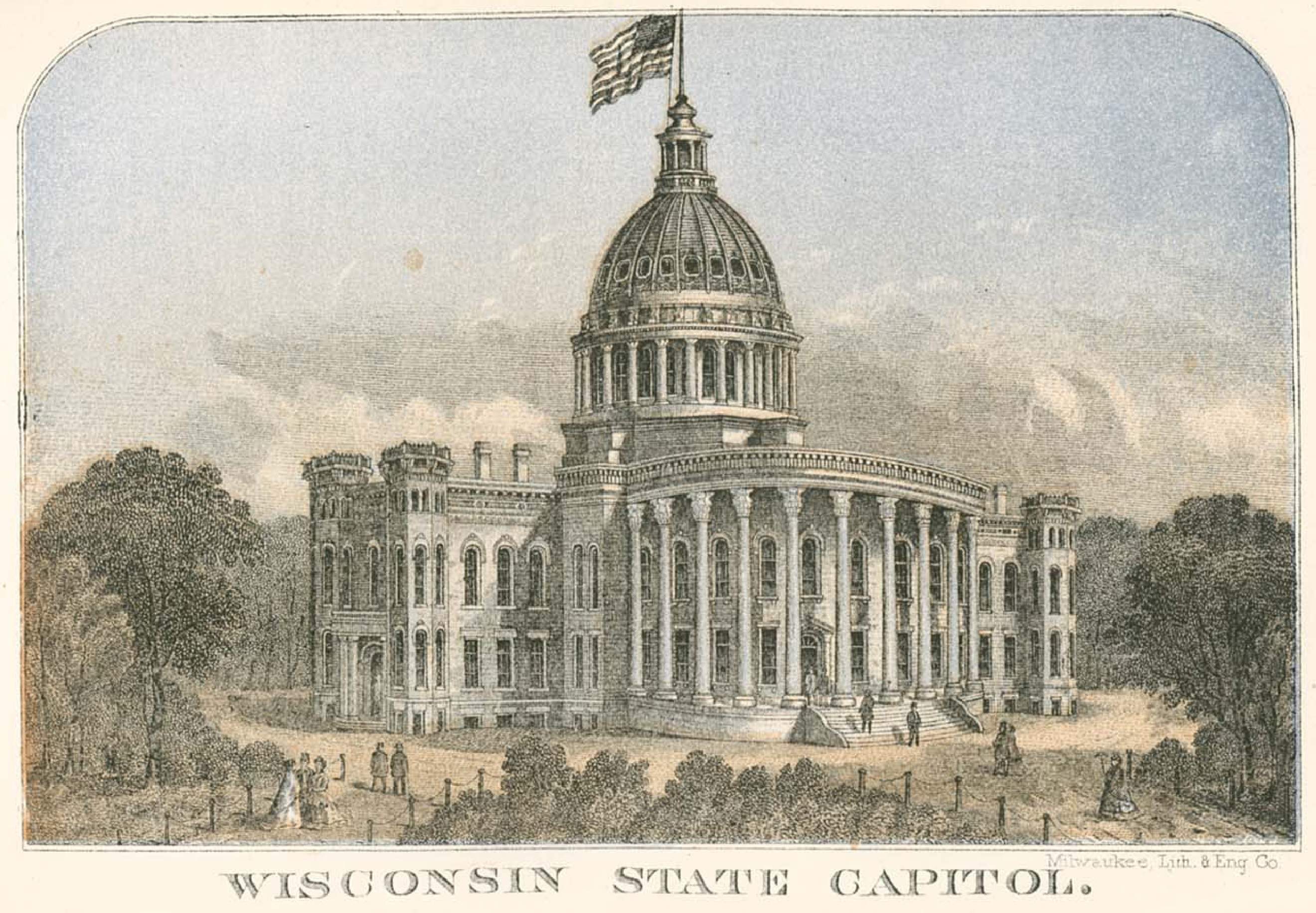
- Wisconsin State Capitol, 1863

Overview
- Legislative body: Wisconsin Legislature
- Meeting place: Wisconsin State Capitol
- Term: January 5, 1880 – January 3, 1881
- Election: November 4, 1879

Senate
- Members: 33
- Senate President: James M. Bingham (R)
- President pro tempore: Thomas B. Scott (R)
- Party control: Republican

Assembly
- Members: 100
- Assembly Speaker: Alexander A. Arnold (R)
- Party control: Republican

Sessions
- 1st: January 14, 1880 – March 17, 1880

The Thirty-Third Wisconsin Legislature convened from January 14, 1880, to March 17, 1880, in regular session.

Senators representing even-numbered districts were newly elected for this session and were serving the first year of a two-year term. Assembly members were elected to a one-year term. Assembly members and even-numbered senators were elected in the general election of November 4, 1879. Senators representing odd-numbered districts were serving the second year of their two-year term, having been elected in the general election held on November 5, 1878.

The governor of Wisconsin during this entire term was Republican William E. Smith, of Milwaukee County, serving the first year of his second two-year term, having won re-election in the 1879 Wisconsin gubernatorial election.

== Major events ==
- October 19, 1880: Wisconsin Supreme Court chief justice Edward George Ryan died in office.
- November 2, 1880: James A. Garfield elected the 20th President of the United States.
- November 11, 1880: Governor William E. Smith appointed justice Orsamus Cole as the 6th chief justice of the Wisconsin Supreme Court. On the same day, Smith appointed John B. Cassoday as associate justice.

== Major legislation ==
- March 5, 1880: An Act to allow general accident insurance companies to do business in this state, 1880 Act 105.
- March 11, 1880: An Act to preserve and promote the public health in the city of Milwaukee, 1880 Act 206. Criminalized the act of dumping waste or wastewater into any river or stream in Milwaukee.
- March 15, 1880: An Act to promote good order and repress crime, 1880 Act 238. Created sentence-reduction incentives for good behavior by state prisoners.
- March 15, 1880: An Act for the prevention of cruelty to minors, 1880 Act 239.
- March 15, 1880: An Act to prevent the adulteration of food and medicine and provide for analyzing the same, 1880 Act 252.
- March 16, 1880: An Act relating to non-registered voters and amendatory of section twenty-four of the revised statutes of 1878, 1880 Act 315. Enabled unregistered voters to be eligible to vote with the assistance of a registered voter acting as witness for their eligibility.
- Joint Resolution amending sections numbers 4, 5, 11, and 21, article 4 of the constitution of the State of Wisconsin, 1880 Joint Resolution 9. First legislative passage of a proposed constitutional amendment to double the duration of terms for members of the Assembly from 1 year to 2 years, and for senators from 2 years to 4 years, and to also switch the legislature to biennial rather than annual sessions. The amendment would eventually be ratified at the 1881 Fall general election.
- Joint Resolution proposing an amendment to section 1 of article 3 of the constitution of Wisconsin relating to suffrage, 1880 Joint Resolution 12. Proposed an amendment to the state constitution to allow universal suffrage in Wisconsin for all people over age 21 who were citizens or recent immigrants intent on becoming citizens.

== Party summary ==
=== Senate summary ===
Senate partisan composition Democratic: 8 seats Republican: 25 seats

	Party (Shading indicates majority caucus)		Total	
	Dem.	Rep.	Total	Vacant
End of previous Legislature	9	24	33	0
1st Session	8	25	33	0
Final voting share	24.24%	75.76%		
Beginning of the next Legislature	9	24	33	0

=== Assembly summary ===
Assembly partisan composition Democratic: 28 seats Greenback: 2 seats Republican: 70 seats

	Party (Shading indicates majority caucus)			Total	
	Dem.	Gbk.	Rep.	Total	Vacant
End of previous Legislature	25	9	66	100	0
1st Session	28	2	70	100	0
Final voting share	30%		70%		
Beginning of the next Legislature	21	0	79	100	0

== Sessions ==
- 1st Regular session: January 14, 1880 – March 17, 1880

== Leaders ==
=== Senate leadership ===
- President of the Senate: James M. Bingham (R)
- President pro tempore: Thomas B. Scott (R)

=== Assembly leadership ===
- Speaker of the Assembly: Alexander A. Arnold (R)

== Members ==
=== Members of the Senate ===
Members of the Senate for the Thirty-Third Wisconsin Legislature:

Senate partisan representation Democratic: 8 seats Republican: 25 seats

Dist.	Counties	Senator	Residence	Party
01	Door, Kewaunee, Oconto, & Shawano	George Grimmer	Kewaunee	Rep.
02	Brown	David M. Kelly	Green Bay	Rep.
03	Racine	William E. Chipman	Burlington	Rep.
04	Crawford & Vernon	Ormsby B. Thomas	Prairie du Chien	Rep.
05	Milwaukee (Northern Part)	Isaac W. Van Schaick	Milwaukee	Rep.
06	Milwaukee (Southern Part)	George H. Paul	Milwaukee	Dem.
07	Milwaukee (Central Part)	Edwin Hyde	Milwaukee	Rep.
08	Kenosha & Walworth	Joseph V. Quarles	Kenosha	Rep.
09	Green Lake, Marquette, & Waushara	Hobart S. Sacket	Berlin	Rep.
10	Waukesha	Richard Weaver	Lisbon	Dem.
11	Chippewa, Clark, Lincoln, Price, Taylor, & Wood	Thomas B. Scott	Grand Rapids	Rep.
12	Green & Lafayette	John W. Blackstone	Shullsburg	Rep.
13	Dodge	Edward C. McFetridge	Beaver Dam	Rep.
14	Juneau & Sauk	Edwin E. Woodman	Baraboo	Rep.
15	Manitowoc	Joseph Rankin	Manitowoc	Dem.
16	Grant	George W. Ryland	Lancaster	Rep.
17	Rock	Hamilton Richardson	Janesville	Rep.
18	Fond du Lac (Western Part)	George E. Sutherland	Ripon	Rep.
19	Winnebago	Andrew Haben	Oshkosh	Dem.
20	Sheboygan & Eastern Fond du Lac	Patrick H. Smith	Plymouth	Dem.
21	Marathon, Portage, & Waupaca	John A. Kellogg	Wausau	Rep.
22	Calumet & Outagamie	Benjamin F. Carter	Harrison	Dem.
23	Jefferson	Joseph B. Bennett	Watertown	Rep.
24	Ashland, Barron, Bayfield, Burnett, Douglas, Polk, & St. Croix	Sam S. Fifield	Ashland	Rep.
25	Dane (Eastern Part)	George B. Burrows	Madison	Rep.
26	Dane (Western Part)	Matthew Anderson	Cross Plains	Dem.
27	Adams & Columbia	Charles L. Dering	Columbus	Rep.
28	Iowa & Richland	Joseph McGrew	Richland	Rep.
29	Buffalo, Pepin, & Trempealeau	Horace E. Houghton	Durand	Rep.
30	Dunn, Eau Claire, & Pierce	Michael Griffin	Eau Claire	Rep.
31	La Crosse	Gysbert Van Steenwyk	La Crosse	Rep.
32	Jackson & Monroe	William T. Price	Black River Falls	Rep.
33	Ozaukee & Washington	Lyman Morgan	Port Washington	Dem.

=== Members of the Assembly ===
Members of the Assembly for the Thirty-Third Wisconsin Legislature:

Assembly partisan composition Democratic: 28 seats Greenback: 2 seats Republican: 70 seats

Senate District	County	Dist.	Representative	Party	Residence
27	Adams		Solon Pierce	Rep.	Friendship
24	Ashland, Barron, Bayfield, Burnett, Douglas, & Polk		Lars L. Gunderson	Rep.	Lakeland
02	Brown	1	Benjamin Fontaine	Rep.	Green Bay
02	Brown	2	David E. Sedgwick	Rep.	Wrightstown
02	Brown	3	Chester G. Wilcox	Dem.	Depere
29	Buffalo & Pepin	1	Franklin Gilman	Rep.	Gilmanton
29	Buffalo & Pepin	2	William Allison	Rep.	Maxville
22	Calumet		J. W. Parkinson	Dem.	Brothertown
11	Chippewa & Price		Hector McRae	Rep.	Chippewa Falls
11	Clark, Lincoln, Taylor & Wood		Niran Withee	Rep.	Neillsville
27	Columbia	1	Addison Eaton	Rep.	Lodi
27	Columbia	2	Matthew Lowth	Dem.	Columbus
04	Crawford		Atley Peterson	Rep.	Soldiers Grove
26	Dane	1	John H. Tierney	Dem.	Waunakee
25	Dane	2	Thomas Beattie	Rep.	Stoughton
25	Dane	3	Charles G. Crosse	Rep.	Sun Prairie
13	Dodge	1	William Fleming	Dem.	Emmet
13	Dodge	2	Joseph Heimerl	Dem.	Farmersville
13	Dodge	3	DeWitt C. Williams	Rep.	Chester
13	Dodge	4	Benjamin F. Sherman	Dem.	Beaver Dam
01	Door		Edward S. Minor	Rep.	Fish Creek
30	Dunn		John McGilton	Rep.	Red Cedar
30	Eau Claire		Ira B. Bradford	Rep.	Augusta
18	Fond du Lac	1	William A. Adamson	Rep.	Eldorado
18	Fond du Lac	2	Daniel D. Treleven	Rep.	Byron
18	Fond du Lac	3	John F. Ware	Rep.	Fond du Lac
20	Fond du Lac	4	Ignatius Klotz	Dem.	Campbellsport
16	Grant	1	Charles Watson	Rep.	Washburn
16	Grant	2	John A. Klindt	Rep.	Cassville
16	Grant	3	John Brindley	Rep.	Boscobel
12	Green	1	Cyrus Troy	Rep.	Mount Pleasant
12	Green	2	Burr Sprague	Rep.	Brodhead
09	Green Lake		Richard Pritchard	Rep.	Manchester
28	Iowa	1	Richard R. Kennedy	Dem.	Highland
28	Iowa	2	George G. Cox	Rep.	Mineral Point
32	Jackson		Robert D. Wilson	Rep.	North Bend
23	Jefferson	1	Jesse Stone	Rep.	Watertown
23	Jefferson	2	John D. Bullock	Rep.	Johnson Creek
23	Jefferson	3	Samuel A. Craig	Dem.	Fort Atkinson
14	Juneau	1	George P. Kenyon	Dem.	Wonewoc
14	Juneau	2	John T. Kingston	Rep.	Necedah
08	Kenosha		Cornelius Williams	Rep.	Bristol
01	Kewaunee		Joseph E. Darbellay	Dem.	Kewaunee
31	La Crosse		John Bradley	Rep.	Bangor
11	Lafayette	1	Thomas E. Sheldon	Rep.	Darlington
11	Lafayette	2	Bernard McGinty	Dem.	Kendall
15	Manitowoc	1	John Carey	Dem.	Osman
15	Manitowoc	2	Frederick Pfunder	Dem.	Nero
15	Manitowoc	3	William H. Hemschemeyer	Rep.	Manitowoc
21	Marathon		John Ringle	Dem.	Wausau
09	Marquette		Charles S. Kelsey	Rep.	Montello
05	Milwaukee	1	Charles C. Paine	Rep.	Milwaukee
07	Milwaukee	2	Otto Laverrenz	Rep.	Milwaukee
07	Milwaukee	3	Edward Keogh	Dem.	Milwaukee
07	Milwaukee	4	Edward B. Simpson	Rep.	Milwaukee
06	Milwaukee	5	John Bentley	Dem.	Milwaukee
05	Milwaukee	6	Christopher Raesser	Rep.	Milwaukee
07	Milwaukee	7	Charles L. Colby	Rep.	Milwaukee
06	Milwaukee	8	Charles F. Freeman	Dem.	Milwaukee
05	Milwaukee	9	Luther F. Gilson	Rep.	Milwaukee
05	Milwaukee	10	Washington Boorse	Rep.	Granville
06	Milwaukee	11	Patrick Merritty	Dem.	Hales Corners
32	Monroe	1	Eli Waste	Rep.	Sparta
32	Monroe	2	Robert Campbell	Rep.	Glendale
01	Oconto & Shawano		Herman Naber	Ind.D.	Shawano
22	Outagamie	1	John C. Petersen	Gbk.	Appleton
22	Outagamie	2	James McMurdo	Rep.	Hortonville
33	Ozaukee		William H. Fitzgerald	Ind.D.	Cedarburg
30	Pierce		Nils P. Haugen	Rep.	River Falls
21	Portage		Thomas McDill	Rep.	McDill
03	Racine	1	William P. Packard	Dem.	Racine
03	Racine	2	John Bosustow	Rep.	Yorkville
28	Richland	1	William H. Joslin	Rep.	Richland Center
28	Richland	2	John H. Case	Rep.	Eagle
17	Rock	1	Richard J. Burdge	Rep.	Beloit
17	Rock	2	Franklin S. Lawrence	Rep.	Janesville
17	Rock	3	Simon Lord	Rep.	Edgerton
14	Sauk	1	Ephraim Blakeslee	Rep.	Ironton
14	Sauk	2	Thomas Gillespie	Rep.	Delton
20	Sheboygan	1	Wilbur M. Root	Dem.	Sheboygan
20	Sheboygan	2	Eugene McIntyre	Rep.	Lyndon
20	Sheboygan	3	John Ruch	Rep.	Scott
24	St. Croix		James Hill	Rep.	Warren
29	Trempealeau		Alexander A. Arnold	Rep.	Galesville
04	Vernon	1	Jacob Eckhardt	Rep.	De Soto
04	Vernon	2	David C. Yakey	Rep.	Clinton
08	Walworth	1	George R. Allen	Rep.	Bloomfield
08	Walworth	2	Dwight B. Barnes	Rep.	Delavan
08	Walworth	3	Caleb S. Blanchard	Rep.	East Troy
33	Washington	1	Jacob C. Place	Dem.	Hartford
33	Washington	2	Baruch S. Weil	Dem.	West Bend
10	Waukesha	1	John Schmidt	Dem.	Muskego
10	Waukesha	2	William Small	Rep.	Lisbon
21	Waupaca	1	Sewall A. Phillips	Rep.	Royalton
21	Waupaca	2	Nels Anderson	Rep.	Scandinavia
09	Waushara		Charles W. Moors	Rep.	Hancock
19	Winnebago	1	William Wall	Rep.	Oshkosh
19	Winnebago	2	A. H. F. Krueger	Dem.	Neenah
19	Winnebago	3	Hiram W. Webster	Rep.	Omro
19	Winnebago	4	David R. Bean	Gbk.	Rushford

== Employees ==
=== Senate employees ===
- Chief Clerk: Charles E. Bross
  - Assistant Clerk: J. F. A. Williams
  - Bookkeeper: T. S. Ansley
  - Engrossing Clerk: John P. Mitchell
  - Enrolling Clerk: John P. Webster
  - Transcribing Clerk: Gilbert Tennant
  - Proofreader: Thomas A. Dyson
  - Clerk for the Judiciary Committee: Walter L. Houser
  - Clerk for the Committee on Claims: J. Lamborn
  - Clerk for the Committee on Enrolled Bills: Charles Pinckney
  - Clerk for the Committee on Engrossed Bills: Charles H. Darlington
  - Document Clerk: William Graham
- Sergeant-at-Arms: Chalmers Ingersoll
  - Assistant Sergeant-at-Arms: Daniel Harshman
- Postmaster: A. C. Fraser
  - Assistant Postmaster: James E. Heg
- Gallery Attendants:
  - Jacob Cleaver
  - A. J. Barsantee
- Wash Room Attendant: William McCann
- Document Room Attendant: Frank S. Hatson
- Enrolling Room Attendant: H. R. Rawson
- Committee Room Attendant: Oscar M. Dering
- Doorkeepers:
  - M. Simon
  - W. F. Cochran
  - Edwin Rowclitt
  - Louis Goeller
- Porter: W. L. Dowler
- Night Watch: G. H. Markstrom
- President's Messenger: Ralph Irish
- Chief Clerk's Messenger: J. G. Hyland
- Sergeant-at-Arms' Messenger: Edward N. Potter
- Messengers:
  - Charles Pierce
  - Gustrave Mosier
  - John Rindlaub
  - T. Nelson
- Janitor: M. Finnerty

=== Assembly employees ===
- Chief Clerk: John E. Eldred
  - 1st Assistant Clerk: William M. Fogo
    - 2nd Assistant Clerk: Charles N. Herreid
  - Bookkeeper: O. A. Southmayd
  - Engrossing Clerk: P. H. Swift
  - Enrolling Clerk: T. J. Vaughn
  - Transcribing Clerk: C. H. Ladd
  - Proof Reader: J. A. Ellis
- Sergeant-at-Arms: Daniel H. Pulcifer
  - Assistant Sergeant-at-Arms: George W. Church
- Postmaster: W. W. Sturtevant
  - Assistant Postmaster: T. M. Griswold
- Doorkeepers:
  - Isidore Lison
  - George Seebald
  - Dehart McLummins
  - Charles A. Vaetz
- Gallery Attendant: Otto Comdohr
- Night Watch: W. R. Alban
- Room Attendants:
  - William Gillillan Jr.
  - J. W. Dunn
- Speaker's Messenger: Paul R. Colvin
- Clerk's Messenger: Eddie Cavanaugh
- Sergeant-at-Arms' Messenger: Adolph Roeder
- Messengers:
  - George Bean
  - Hugh Edwards
  - Thomas Jones
  - Alma Marsden
  - Frank Leonard
  - Thomas Gillespie
  - C. Hindrich
  - J. Kohner
  - Edwin Dahlby
  - John Kempf
