= 1879 United States Senate election in Wisconsin =

- January 22, 1879
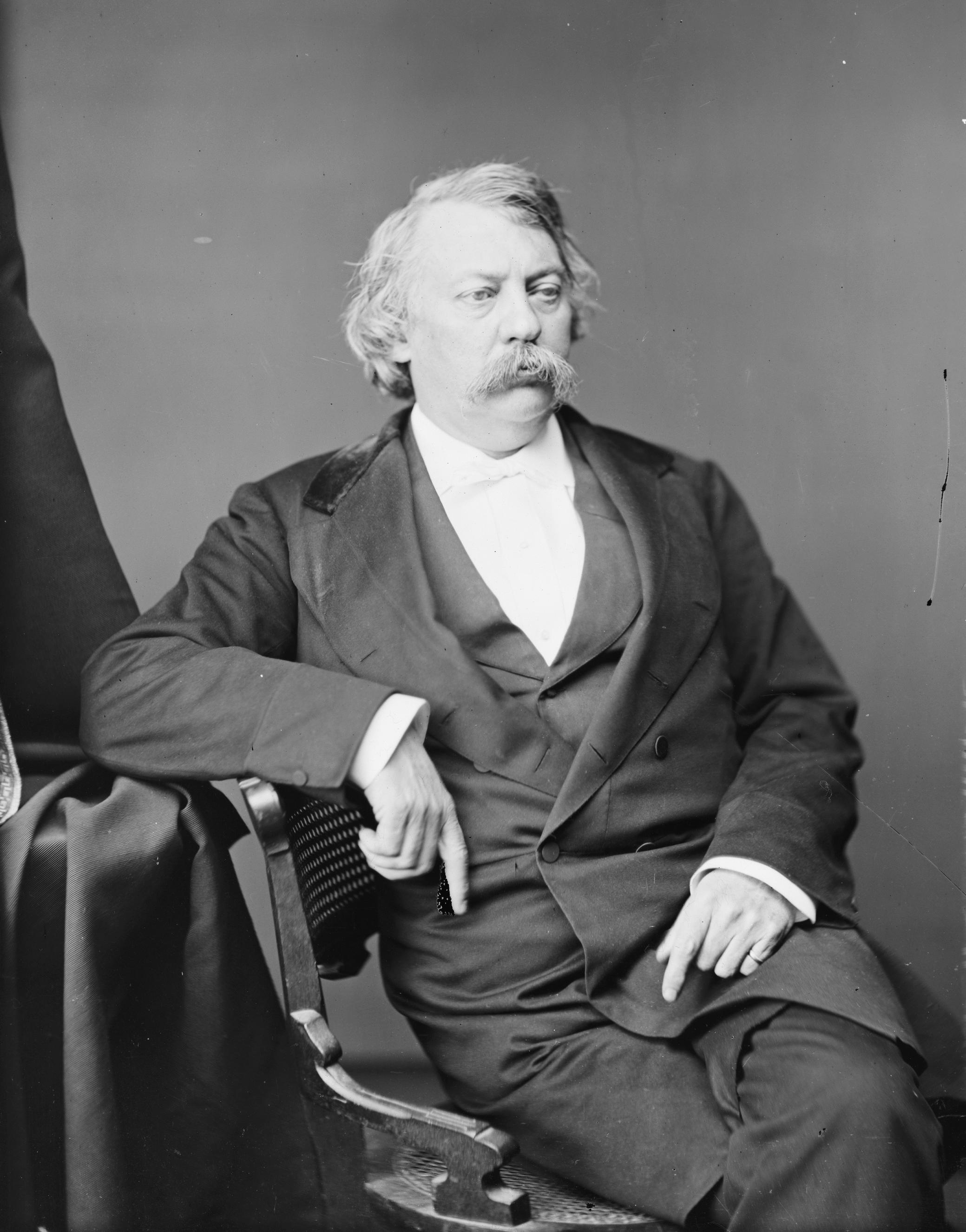

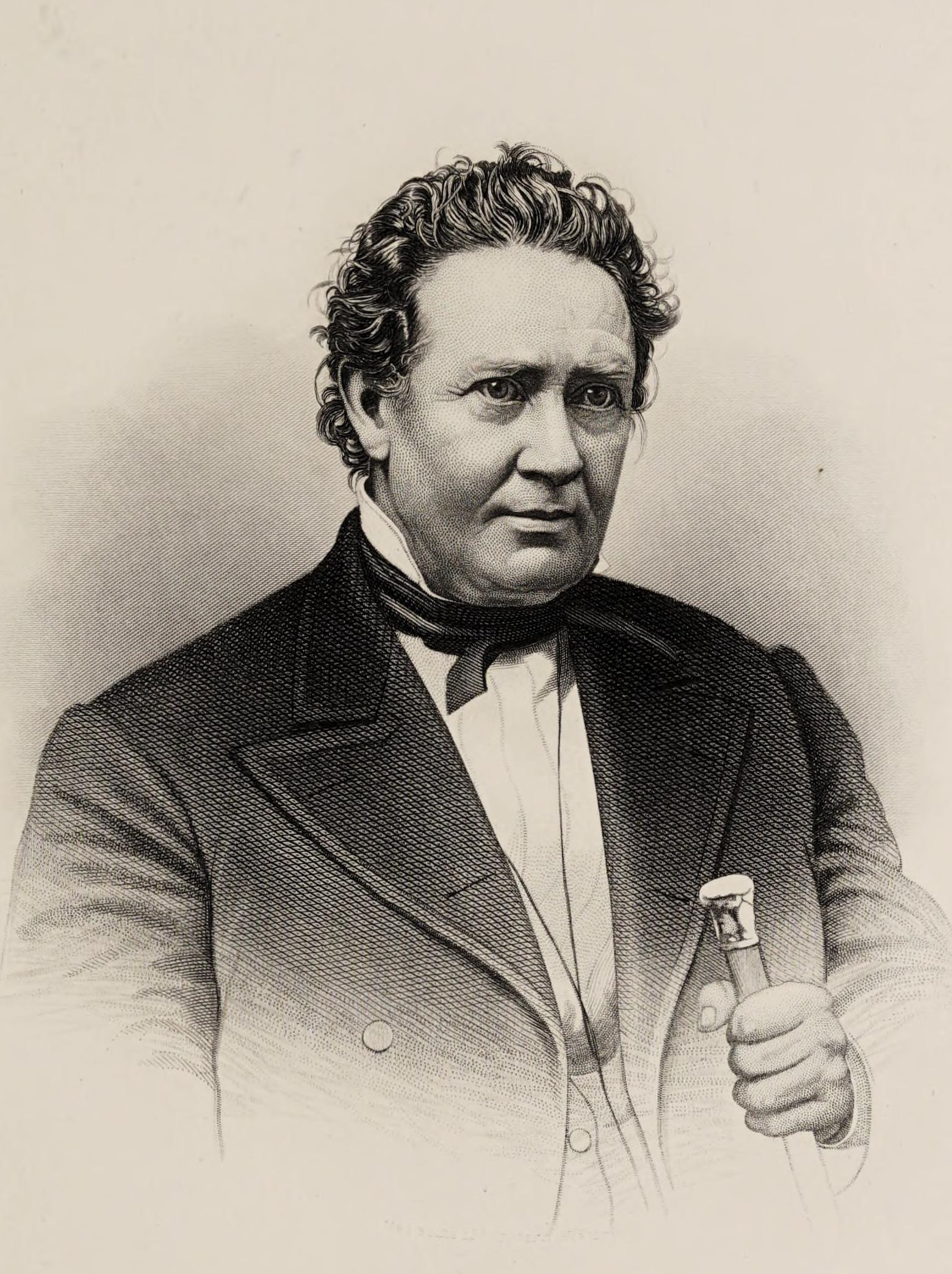

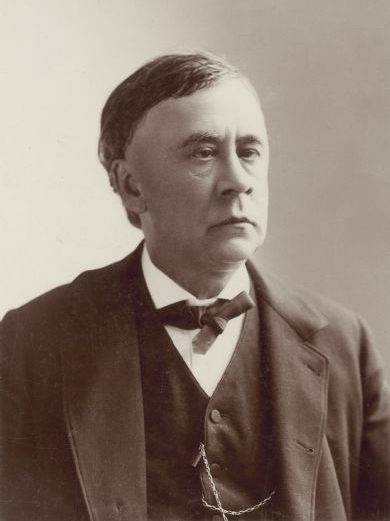
Nominee	Matthew H. Carpenter	Edward G. Ryan	Gabriel Bouck
Party	Republican	Democratic	Democratic
Legislative vote	84	28	13
Percentage	67.20%	22.40%	10.40%
U.S. senator before election
Timothy O. Howe
Republican
Elected U.S. Senator
Matthew H. Carpenter
Republican

The 1879 United States Senate election in Wisconsin was held in the 32nd Wisconsin Legislature on January 22, 1879. Incumbent Republican U.S. senator Timothy O. Howe ran for a fourth six-year term, but was defeated for renomination. Former U.S. senator Matthew H. Carpenter—who had been ousted by a split in the party four years earlier—was elected United States senator on the 1st ballot.

At the start of the 1879 term, Republicans held large majorities in both chambers of the Wisconsin Legislature, so had more than enough votes to elect a Republican United States senator. The main drama of the election was in the Republican caucus, which dragged out for a week and went to 96 ballots as they failed to agree on a nominee. Republican party boss Elisha W. Keyes was seeking the U.S. Senate seat as a crowning achievement in his mastery of the Wisconsin Republican Party, but would require unseating his former ally, the incumbent U.S. senator Timothy Howe, who still had a large loyal following. Former U.S. senator Matt Carpenter, who had been ousted by a party rebellion in 1875 also had significant support in the caucus for his return to office.

After 96 failed votes, Keyes and Howe withdrew and endorsed Carpenter; Carpenter was then unanimously nominated less than an hour before the start of the joint session of the legislature. The Republican caucus was likely afraid of a repeat of the 1875 election, where a divided party had allowed the Democrats to effectively choose which Republican would become U.S. senator.

== Major candidates ==
=== Democratic ===
- Gabriel Bouck, incumbent U.S. representative of Wisconsin's 6th congressional district.
- Edward George Ryan, incumbent chief justice of the Wisconsin Supreme Court.

=== Republican ===
- Matthew H. Carpenter, former U.S. senator.
- Timothy O. Howe, incumbent U.S. senator, former Wisconsin circuit court judge from Green Bay.
- Elisha W. Keyes, head of the "Madison Regency" political machine and de-facto head of the Republican Party of Wisconsin throughout this era, former mayor of Madison.

== Results ==
=== Republican nomination ===
Prior to the Republican caucus, Republican Party boss Elisha Keyes made an extensive campaign for the nomination with the support of many allies, operatives, and loyal newspapers around the state; several papers reported that he was nearly guaranteed to secure the U.S. Senate seat, possibly with near-unanimous support. It was also suggested that Keyes had been preparing to win a special election for U.S. Senate two years earlier, when he believed the Republican incumbent senator, Timothy Howe, would be appointed to the U.S. Supreme Court. Although Senator Howe was still seeking another term and Republicans generally did not object to him on policy or personal grounds, many described him as too old (at age 63), and having served long enough (about to complete his third six-year term).

The Republican caucus met on January 16. An initial informal ballot was taken, indicating roughly equal support for Keyes, Howe, and former U.S. senator Matt Carpenter, with a scattering of votes for other candidates. Over the course of the night, they took 21 ballots for the nomination with very little change in the outcome. They re-convened on January 17 and continued voting. After 49 ballots, the top three candidates remained roughly tied even as other minor candidates fell off. They adjourned for the weekend and returned to caucus on January 20, where voting resumed. Numerous dark horse alternative candidates rose and fell, but none of them attained even 10% of the caucus vote. Voting continued on the 20th until 12:30 am, with the 79th formal ballot showing little change from the first. They reconvened at 11 am on January 21 to continued voting through the entire day. During the course of the day on January 21, the legislators also had to cast their ballots in their respective chambers as an informal step before the joint session. That informal vote found Keyes receiving 29 votes, Democrat Edward G. Ryan receiving 29, Carpenter receiving 26, Howe receiving 24, Democrat Gabriel Bouck receiving 11, and 10 scattering.

Back in the Republican caucus, voting continued. The 96th ballot showed almost no change from the first day, with Keyes stuck at 25, Carpenter with 33, and Howe with 28. At about 9:12 pm, a motion was made for a 97th ballot, but no one seconded the motion. They instead narrowly voted to adjourn until 9 am the following day, an hour before the joint session was scheduled to begin.

On the morning of January 22, state senator George B. Burrows gave an impassioned speech extolling the virtues of his candidate, Keyes, before announcing Keyes's withdrawal from the race and calling for the unanimous nomination of Matt Carpenter. Assembly speaker David M. Kelly, a supporter of Howe, then spoke and seconded Burrows' motion. Carpenter was then declared the nominee by acclamation.

=== Official vote ===
The 32nd Wisconsin Legislature met in joint session on January 22, 1879, to elect a U.S. senator. The voting was almost entirely along party lines, with one vacant seat, and seven members absent or not voting. Of the 125 present and voting, Matt Carpenter received the votes of every Republican legislator, winning the election.

1st Vote of the 32nd Wisconsin Legislature, January 22, 1879
Party	Candidate	Votes	%
Republican	Matthew H. Carpenter	84 (Note: Carpenter received the votes of all Republican members except for senators Gysbert Van Steenwyk Sr. and David E. Welch, and representatives Knud Adland, John Bradley, and Roger Williams (who were all absent).)	67.20%
Democratic	Edward George Ryan	28 (Note: Ryan received the votes of all Democrats except senators Andrew Haben and George Howard Paul and representatives Philip Greening and Francis Steffen (who voted for Bouck), and senator John A. Rice and representative James D. Condit (who were absent).)	22.40%
Democratic	Gabriel Bouck	13 (Note: Bouck received the votes of all of the Greenbackers, along with Democratic senators Andrew Haben and George Howard Paul, and Democratic representatives Philip Greening and Francis Steffen.)	10.40%
	Absent or not voting	7	
	Vacant seats	1 (Note: Republican senator Charles Phillips died before the start of the session.)	
Majority		63	50.40%
Total votes		125	93.98%
Republican hold			
