= Tionondogen =

Tionondogen (also known as Tionondogue or Tionontoguen) was the westernmost and most important of the three large palisaded towns of the Mohawk Nation of Haudenosaunee. These towns were termed "castles" by the Europeans. Because of its position as the farthest upstream on the Mohawk River Tionondogen is often referred to as the "Upper Castle".

The town was located at what is known as the "White Orchard" archaeological site in the town of Palatine, New York on the north bank of the Mohawk. A previous identification of the town with the "Wagner's Hollow" site, on Caroga Creek, also in the Town of Palatine, is discredited today. The site occupies 1.4 hectares (3.5 acres). Population has been estimated at between 700 and 900 people.

== History ==
Tionondogen was first built following the raid of the lieutenant-général of New France, Alexandre de Prouville de Tracy in 1666, which destroyed the major Mohawk towns then located south of the river.

A peace treaty with the French forced the Mohawks to accept Jesuit missionaries. Father Jacques Bruyas established their mission of St. Marys' in Tionondogen in 1668. There he wrote grammar, a dictionary, catechism and a prayer-book in the Mohawk language.

In 1677 an English visitor, Wentworth Greenhalgh wrote "Tionondogue is doubly Stockadoed around, has four Ports four foott wide a piece, contains about thirty houses, is situated on a Hill a Bow shott from the Mohawk river."

In 1679 the Jesuits left the Mohawk Valley and took a large number of converts with them to Kahnawake, near Montreal.

In 1689 the Mohawks began work on a new castle nearby. The proceedings of the City of Albany read: "The Maquase desire by Arnout's letter to assist them with two or three pair of horses and five or six men to ride the heqaviest stockades for their new castle of Tionondoge which they remove an English mile higher up." The Albany government sent three pair of horses and six men "to show their good inclination and true friendship they entertained toward their Mohawk brethren." Apparently this work had not been completed by 1693.

In 1693, Count Frontenac mounted another expedition against the Mohawks. The French captured and burned Caughnawaga and Canajoharie without a fight, and Tionondogue after a surprise attack that killed about 20 or 30 and took 300 captives. Following this the town was abandoned and the Mohawks moved back to the south bank of the river.

== Archaeology ==
In the late 1800s amateur archaeologist and collector Adelbert G. Richmond did some digging on the site, but otherwise it was not widely known. Some of the material Richmond collected is in the "Richmond/Frey Collection" of the Montgomery County Historical Society in Old Fort Johnson at Fort Johnson, New York. Following this there has been some sporadic artifact collection. A team from the University at Albany has walked the site, but as of 1995 no formal excavation had taken place. At that time the site was on private land in a cultivated field.

== See also ==
- Garoga Site
- Caughnawaga Indian Village Site
- Mohawk Upper Castle Historic District
- National Shrine of the North American Martyrs
- Smith Pagerie Site
- Klock Site
- Rice's Woods
