= Ahatsistari =

Wendat warrior

Eustache Ahatsistari (Wyandot: Ahatsistari, c. 1602 – August 19, 1642) was a Wendat warrior. He is famous for his conversion to Catholicism and his death at the hands of the Haudenosaunee. Ahatsistari was captured alongside St. Isaac Jogues and several other Wendat prisoners in 1642 and was tortured and executed. He is notable for his conversion to Christianity and his role in the lives of early French missionaries in the Americas.

== Life ==
Ahatsistari was born in 1602 in the Wendat village of Teanostaiae, also called St. Joseph. He requested to be baptized in 1639 but was rejected for not complying with Jesuit practices.

He was baptized on April 4, 1642 with the name Eustache.

Ahatsistari had a reputation as a powerful warrior. In the summer of 1640, he led a successful attack on a group of Haudenosaunee canoes in spite of his companions' desire to retreat. In 1641, Ahatsistari led a group of 50 Wendat warriors against a group of 300 Haudenosaunee, some of whom were captured and taken prisoner by the Wendat.

== Capture and death ==
On August 2, 1642, Ahatsistari led a group of 40 Wendat warriors who were escorting French missionaries from Trois-Rivières to Ste. Marie. The group encountered tracks of Haudenosaunee warriors, but Ahatsistari determined that the group that had made the tracks was smaller than their own party. As they continued, the entire group--including Jesuit missionaries René Goupil and Isaac Jogues--were captured by a group of Haudenosaunee warriors. The Haudenosaunee held the party captive and tortured them over the course of several days.

The captives were paraded through Haudenosaunee villages where the villagers hit them with sticks and iron rods. In each village, they were bound to a platform where they then had burning coals and cinders thrown at them. The Haudenosaunee removed both of Ahatsistari's thumbs and inserted sharpened sticks through the open wounds. After being tortured for several days, Ahatsistari and two other Wendat were selected to be executed. Ahatsistari was taken to Tionondogen, burned to death, and beheaded.

== Legacy ==
Ahatsistari is a significant figure in the story of St. Isaac Jogues as well as the martyr René Groupil. He is one of the most notable success stories of Catholic conversions of Native Americans. For St. Isaac Jogues and René Groupil, their torture by their Haudenosaunee captors led to them being canonized by the Catholic church. As he was not a member of the clergy, Ahatsistari has not been recognized by the Catholic church.

Since Ahatsistari was a notable warrior and role model for Wendat men, Ahatsistari’s conversion to Christianity inspired many of his tribesmen to convert as well. Specifically, upon his death, several friends of his converted to Christianity to ensure that they would be reunited with Ahatsistari upon their deaths. It is likely that many of these converts, including Ahatsistari himself, were motivated at least in part by the fact that the Jesuits would allow them increased access to firearms, which would then increase their abilities as warriors and the strength of the tribe as a whole.
