= Greening (surname) =

Greening is a surname. Notable people with the surname include:

- Colin Greening (b. 1986), Canadian ice hockey player
- Henry Thomas Greening (1730–1809), gardener to King George II at Windsor
- Ivan Lewis Greening (b. 1980), birth name of musician Ivan Moody
- John Greening (b. 1950), former Australian rules footballer
- Jonathan Greening (b. 1979), English footballer
- Justine Greening (b. 1969), English politician and Member of Parliament
- Karen Greening (b. 1962), Canadian rock and jazz singer a.k.a. Lee Aaron
- Kevin Greening (1962–2007), British radio presenter
- Mark Greening, musician with the band Electric Wizard
- Paul Greening (1928–2008), British courtier
- Phil Greening (b. 1975), former English rugby union player
- Philip Greening (1824–1906), American politician and blacksmith
- Rhondi Greening, pen name of Rhondi A. Vilott Salsitz, American science fiction and fantasy author
- Thomas Greening (1882–1956), English cricketer
