= Greening (disambiguation) =

Greening may refer to:

== People ==
- Greening (surname)

== Other uses ==
- Greening, the act or process of becoming 'green' or environmentally friendly
  - Greening Australia
  - Greening Greater Toronto
  - Greening Earth Society
- citrus greening disease, or Huanglongbing, a citrus disease caused by the bacterium, Candidatus Liberibacter spp.
- De-etiolation, or greening, the changes in a plant when it finally obtains light, such as when emerging from the ground or after insufficient light exposure
- Greening, Michigan, a former community
- Greening, a drug slang term for when a recreational drug user begins to feel faint and vomits

== See also ==
- Greening's Frog
- The Greening of America
