= Hemmi =

Hemmi is a surname. Notable people with the surname include:

- Heini Hemmi (born 1949), Swiss alpine skier
- Heinz Hemmi (1899–1985), Swiss sprinter
- Masaki Hemmi (born 1986), Japanese footballer and coach
- Ulrich Hemmi (1829–1895), American politician
