= Reform Party (19th-century Wisconsin) =

Political party in Wisconsin in the 1800s

Reform
- Leader: William Taylor
- Ideology: Classical liberalism Anti-temperance

The Reform Party, also called Liberal Reform Party or People's Reform Party, was a short-lived coalition of Democrats, reform and Liberal Republicans, anti-temperance forces, and Grangers formed in 1873 in the U.S. state of Wisconsin, which secured the election for two years of William Robert Taylor as Governor of Wisconsin, as well as electing a number of state legislators.

== 1870 People's Independent candidates ==
Funding for the party came primarily from Alexander Mitchell, a Democratic banker and railroad magnate who had already been experimenting with a third-party movement to challenge the tight control of Bourbon Democrats over the Democratic Party in Wisconsin, and Elisha W. Keyes' "Madison Regency" over the Wisconsin Republican Party there, as far back as 1870, in the form of a "People's Independent Ticket" of Democrats and Republicans, which ran nine legislative candidates statewide, as well as various local slates. Mitchell, also the Democratic nominee, was elected as a Democrat and caucused as a Democrat in Congress; of the three successful state legislative candidates, Senator John C. Hall and Assemblyman Anson Rood joined the Republican caucus, while Harlow Orton remained independent.

== 1873 campaign ==
In 1873, disaffected Republicans and formerly unaligned Grangers looking for an alternative met at the September convention (being run by leading Democrats) of the as-yet-nameless reform group nominated Democrat and Granger William Robert Taylor to the top of the ticket, with one more Liberal Republican, a couple of respected figures with no political affiliation, and the remainder Democrats. With the Democratic name having acquired a bad reputation, the party adopted the name "Reform Party". It carried all the statewide office, took a majority in the Assembly (counting together those elected as Reformers, as Liberal Republicans, and as Democrats), and came within one seat of a majority in the Senate.

== 1874–75 ==
Mitchell, a conservative at heart, soon began clashing with Taylor (an ineffectual and prickly leader at best); and the Democrats who had been out of office for so long were unhappy when they were not allowed the offices they felt entitled to under the spoils system. Bourbon Democrats, in particular, felt that the Grangers and other reform forces were denying them their share of the fruits of victory. In 1874, the Republicans took 64 seats (out of 100) in the Assembly and retained control of the Senate.

By 1875, with Taylor having lost his bid for re-election, and a disaffected Mitchell now firmly allied with the Bourbons, the coalition had begun to dissolve; Greenbackers, who advocated some of the same policies, began to run their own candidates in 1876. The last edition of the Wisconsin Blue Book listing a legislator as "Reform" was that of 1878, in which Francis Steffen is described as a "Reform Democrat".
