= Garoga Site =

- U.S. National Register of Historic Places
- Nearest city: Ephratah, New York
- Area: 4.5 acres (1.8 ha)
- NRHP reference No.: 80002613
- Added to NRHP: July 22, 1980

Garoga Site is an archaeological site located at Ephratah in Fulton County, New York. It is also known as Las-7, New York State Office of Parks, Recreation, and Historic Preservation Unique Site No. A035-04-0001. It is one of three Mohawk village sites excavated by archaeologist Robert E. Funk in 1969–1970.

The site, dated to the 16th century, also known as Garogo, or Castle Hill, is "perched on a hilltop overlooking Caroga Creek." It was first excavated by Samuel Frey in the 1800s. William Ritchie and Robert Funk "identified a minimum of nine longhouses within the main village area and they also confirmed the location of a short double palisade that runs across the entrance to the village site." They estimated that the village might have held 700 people.

It was listed on the National Register of Historic Places in 1980.
