= Marshall, Richland County, Wisconsin =

Marshall, Wisconsin
- Town
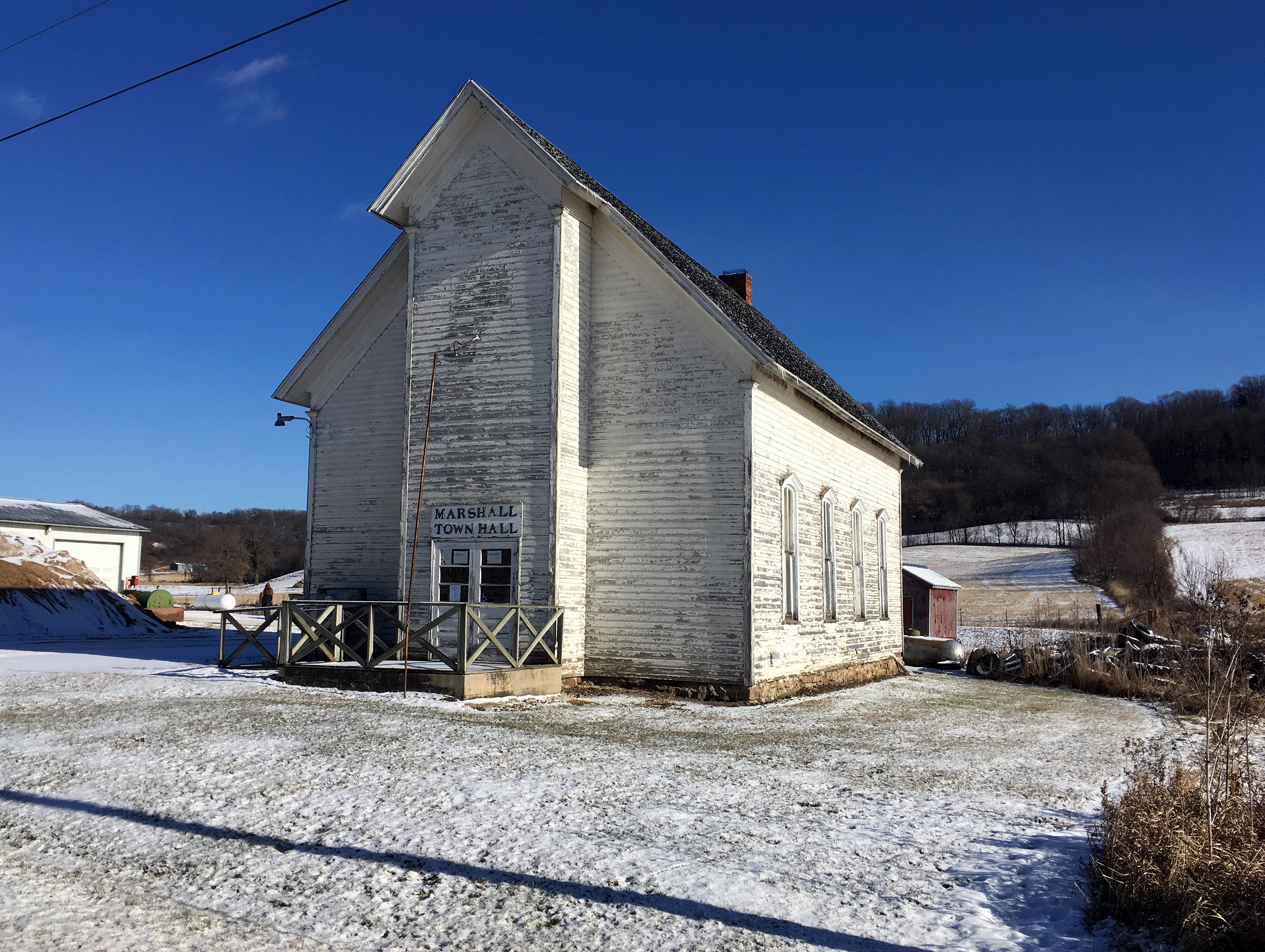
- Marshall Town Hall

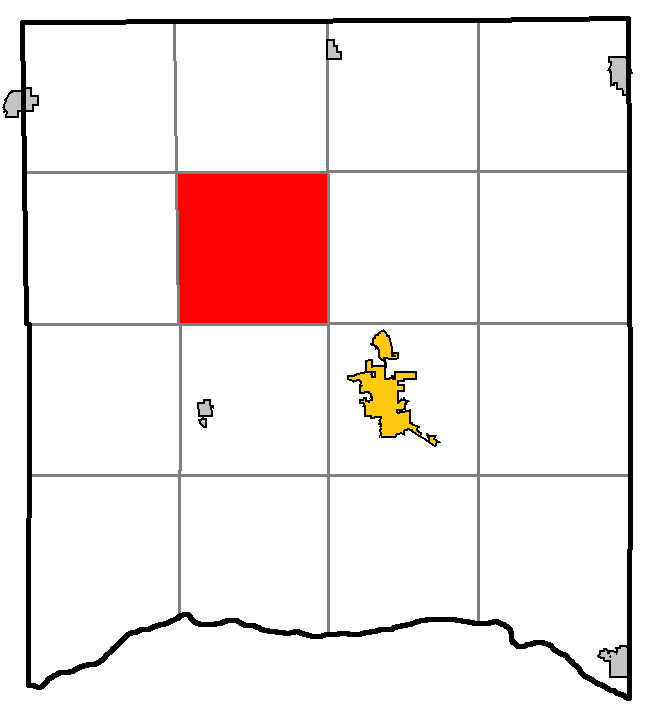
- Location of Marshall, Richland County, Wisconsin

- Location of Richland County, Wisconsin
- Coordinates: 43°25′11″N 90°29′48″W
- Country: United States
- State: Wisconsin
- County: Richland

Area
  - Total: 36.1 sq mi (93.4 km^{2})
  - Land: 36.1 sq mi (93.4 km^{2})
  - Water: 0 sq mi (0.0 km^{2})
- Elevation: 1,004 ft (306 m)

Population (2020)
  - Total: 540
  - Density: 15/sq mi (5.8/km^{2})
- Time zone: UTC-6 (Central (CST))
  - Summer (DST): UTC-5 (CDT)
- Area code: 608
- FIPS code: 55-49600
- GNIS feature ID: 1583663
- Website: https://townofmarshallwi.org/

Marshall is a town in Richland County, Wisconsin, United States. The population was 540 at the 2020 census. The unincorporated community of Gillingham is located in the town. The ghost town of McGrew was also located in the town.

== History ==
The town was named after brothers Harvey and John Marshall, who settled in the town in 1851.

== Geography ==
According to the United States Census Bureau, the town has a total area of 36.0 square miles (93.3 km^{2}), all land.

== Demographics ==
As of the census of 2000, there were 600 people, 211 households, and 163 families residing in the town. The population density was 16.6 people per square mile (6.4/km^{2}). There were 265 housing units at an average density of 7.4 per square mile (2.8/km^{2}). The racial makeup of the town was 97.33% White, 0.17% Native American, 0.33% from other races, and 2.17% from two or more races. Hispanic or Latino of any race were 1.83% of the population.

There were 211 households, out of which 40.3% had children under the age of 18 living with them, 70.6% were married couples living together, 3.3% had a female householder with no husband present, and 22.7% were non-families. 20.4% of all households were made up of individuals, and 9.0% had someone living alone who was 65 years of age or older. The average household size was 2.84 and the average family size was 3.30.

In the town, the population was spread out, with 30.2% under the age of 18, 6.3% from 18 to 24, 26.3% from 25 to 44, 23.2% from 45 to 64, and 14.0% who were 65 years of age or older. The median age was 38 years. For every 100 females, there were 112.8 males. For every 100 females age 18 and over, there were 102.4 males.

The median income for a household in the town was $41,161, and the median income for a family was $48,750. Males had a median income of $33,036 versus $22,847 for females. The per capita income for the town was $20,226. About 4.5% of families and 7.7% of the population were below the poverty line, including 12.6% of those under age 18 and 8.8% of those age 65 or over.

== Notable people ==
- Elihu Bailey, Wisconsin State Representative, preacher and teacher; was Chairman of and justice of the peace in the town
- William M. Fogo, Wisconsin State Representative and newspaper editor, lived in the town

== See also ==
- List of towns in Wisconsin
