= Smith Pagerie Site =

- U.S. National Register of Historic Places
- Nearest city: Ephratah, New York
- Area: 4 acres (1.6 ha)
- NRHP reference No.: 80002615
- Added to NRHP: April 22, 1980

Smith Pagerie Site, also known as Las. 11–4, New York State Office of Parks, Recreation, and Historic Preservation Unique Site No. A035-04-0002, is an archaeological site located at Ephratah in Fulton County, New York, US. It is one of three Mohawk village sites excavated by the archaeologist Robert E. Funk in 1969–1970.

The site is dated from 1560 to 1580. It occupies 4 acres (1.6 ha) just east of Caroga Creek, contains the remains of twelve to fifteen longhouses, and was probably surrounded by a palisade. Its population is estimated to have been around 1350.

It was listed on the National Register of Historic Places in 1980.
