= Joseph Bray Bennett =

19th century American politician

Joseph B. Bennett

Member of the Wisconsin Senate from the 23rd district
- In office January 27, 1879 – January 3, 1881
- Preceded by: Charles H. Phillips
- Succeeded by: Frederick Kusel

Personal details
- Born: February 23, 1833 Bolton, England, UK
- Died: August 17, 1913 (aged 80) Washington, D.C., U.S.
- Resting place: Rock Creek Cemetery, Washington, D.C.
- Party: Republican
- Spouse: Susannah E. Bennett (died 1897)
- Children: Annie V. Bennett; John S. Bennett; Reuben A. Bennett

Joseph Bray Bennett (February 23, 1833 – August 17, 1913) was an English American immigrant, machine manufacturer, and Republican politician. He was a member of the Wisconsin State Senate, representing Jefferson County during the 1879 and 1880 sessions. He worked much of the rest of his life as a clerk in the United States Department of Agriculture.

== Biography ==
Joseph Bray Bennett was born in Bolton, Lancashire, England, in February 1833. He was raised and educated in England, and emigrated to the United States in 1863. He settled briefly in Milwaukee, before moving to Watertown, Wisconsin, where he established a foundry.

In December 1869, he purchased a partnership stake in a machine factory business and became sole proprietor in 1873. The business was then renamed Bennett's Thrashing Machine Factory, but was destroyed by fire in 1879.

He became associated with the Republican Party and served in several positions in the Watertown city government. On January 1, 1879, Jefferson County's state senator Charles H. Phillips died on what would have been the first day of his senate term. At the January 20 special election, Bennett was elected to fill the remainder of his term in the 1879 and 1880 sessions. He was defeated running for re-election in 1880.

Former Wisconsin governor Jeremiah McLain Rusk became United States Secretary of Agriculture in 1889. In the Spring of 1890, he hired Bennett as appointment clerk for the Department of Agriculture. Bennett moved to Washington, D.C., and remained in this job until 1911, when he retired due to poor health.

He died at the home of his son in Washington, D.C., in August 1913.

== Personal life and family ==
Joseph Bennett and his wife, Susannah, were married in England. They had at least three children before her death in 1897. Their daughter, Annie, died the next year. Their sons, Reuben and John, survived them.

== Electoral history ==
=== Wisconsin Senate (1879, 1880) ===
Wisconsin Senate, 23rd District Special Election, 1879
Party	Candidate	Votes	%	±%
Special Election, January 20, 1879
Republican	Joseph B. Bennett	2,413	50.51%	−8.22%
Democratic	Walter Green	2,005	41.97%	+7.22%
Greenback	George W. Bishop	359	7.52%	+1.01%
Plurality		408	8.54%	-15.44%
Total votes		4,777	100.0%	-20.87%
Republican hold				

Wisconsin Senate, 23rd District Election, 1880
Party	Candidate	Votes	%	±%
General Election, November 2, 1880
Democratic	Frederick Kusel	4,390	58.12%	+16.15%
Republican	Joseph B. Bennett (incumbent)	3,080	40.78%	−9.73%
Greenback	George W. Bishop	83	1.10%	−6.42%
Plurality		1,310	17.34%	+8.80%
Total votes		7,553	100.0%	+58.11%
Democratic gain from Republican				

Wisconsin Senate
Preceded by Charles H. Phillips	Member of the Wisconsin Senate from the 23rd district January 27, 1879 – January 3, 1881	Succeeded by Frederick Kusel
