= Gillingham, Wisconsin =

- Unincorporated community
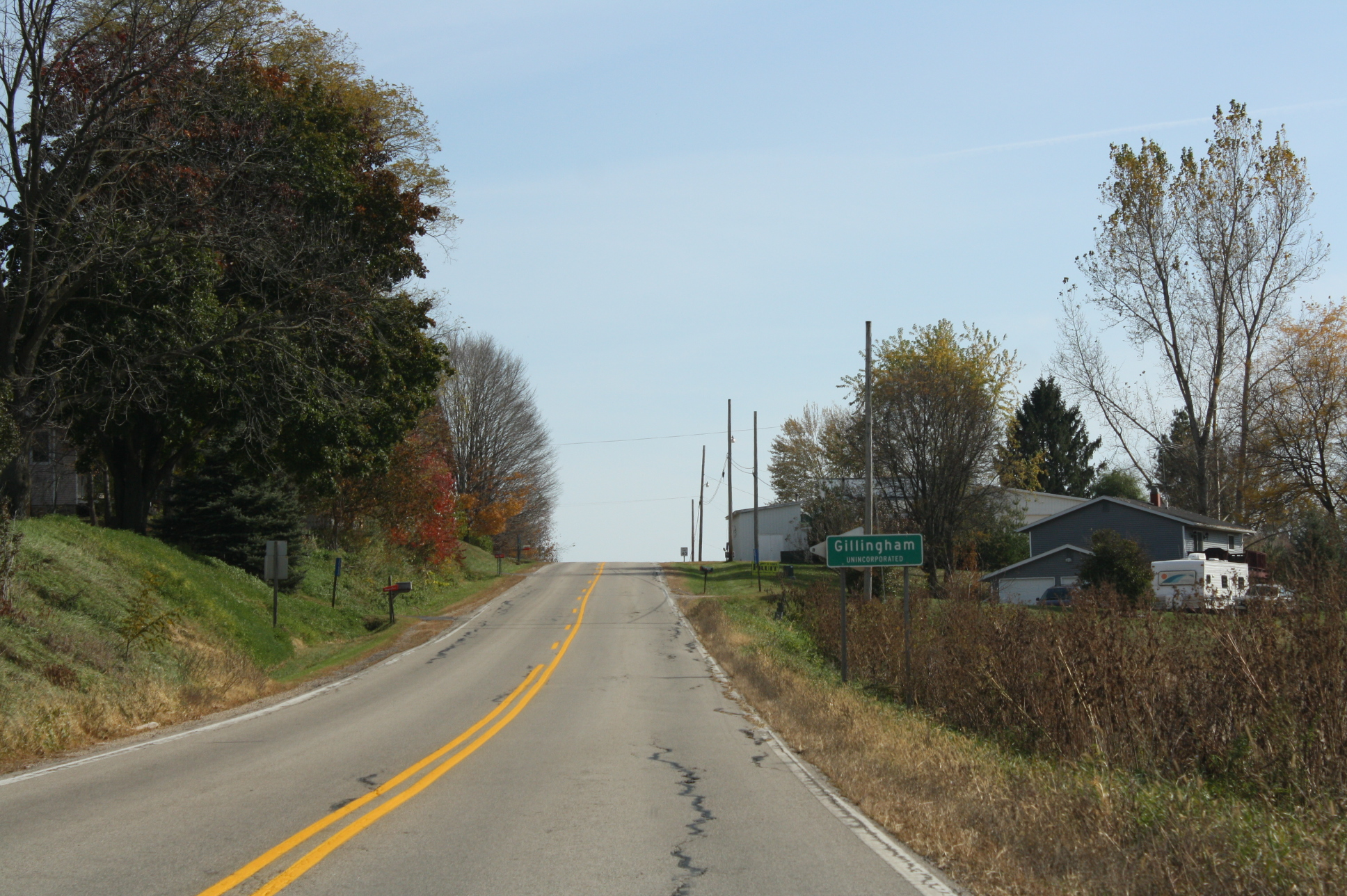
- Sign for Gillingham on WIS 56

- Location within Wisconsin Location within the United States
- Coordinates: 43°25′35″N 90°26′42″W
- Country: United States
- State: Wisconsin
- County: Richland
- Elevation: 804 ft (245 m)
- Time zone: UTC-6 (Central (CST))
  - Summer (DST): UTC-5 (CDT)
- Area code: 608
- GNIS feature ID: 1577610

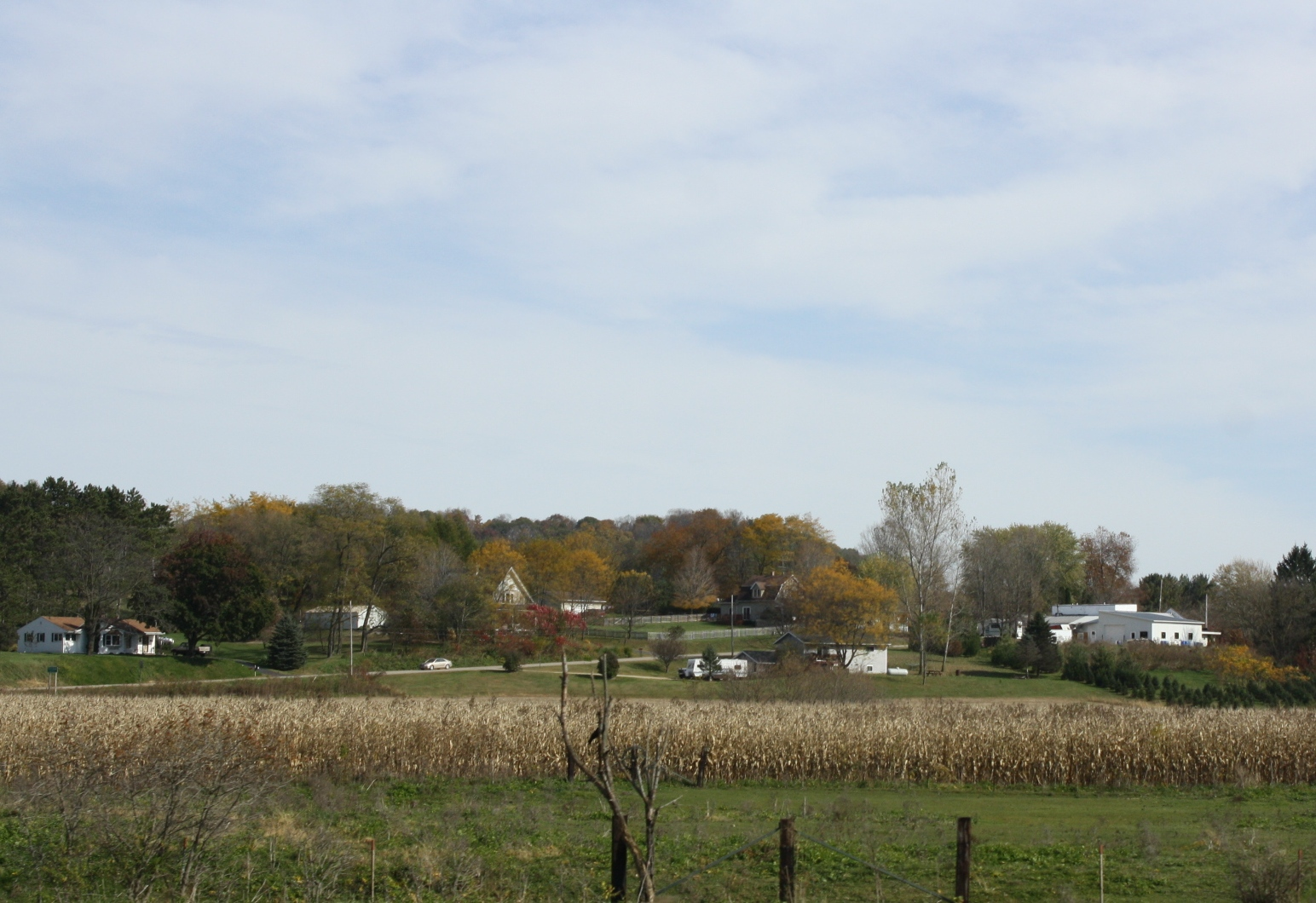
Housing in Gillingham

Gillingham (/ˈɡɪlɪŋhæm/, also /ˈɡɪlɪŋəm/) is an unincorporated community located in the town of Marshall, Richland County, Wisconsin, United States. Gillingham is located on Wisconsin Highway 56 7 miles (11 km) north-northwest of Richland Center. The post office was opened in 1880 with Hugh Morrow as the first postmaster. It was named for John Gillingham, who had encouraged Morrow to move to the area.
