= Scott, Lincoln County, Wisconsin =

Scott, Wisconsin
- Town
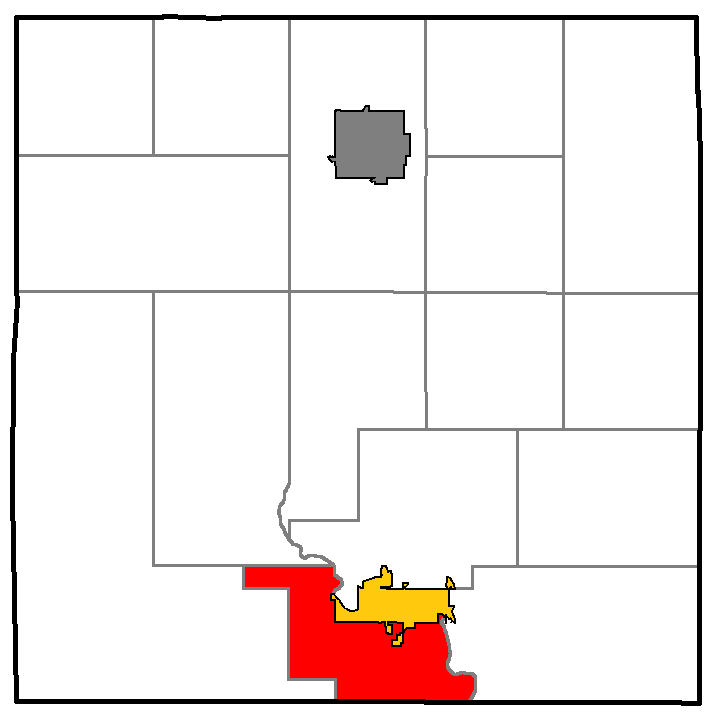
- Location of Scott, within Lincoln County

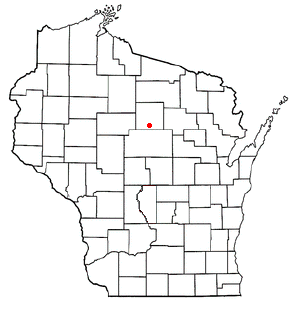
- Location of Scott, Wisconsin
- Coordinates: 45°9′39″N 89°43′37″W
- Country: United States
- State: Wisconsin
- County: Lincoln

Area
  - Total: 30.81 sq mi (79.81 km^{2})
  - Land: 30.17 sq mi (78.13 km^{2})
  - Water: 0.65 sq mi (1.69 km^{2})
- Elevation: 1,332 ft (406 m)

Population (2020)
  - Total: 1,377
  - Density: 45.65/sq mi (17.62/km^{2})
- Time zone: UTC-6 (Central (CST))
  - Summer (DST): UTC-5 (CDT)
- ZIP Code: 54452 (Merrill)
- Area codes: 715 & 534
- FIPS code: 55-069-72300
- GNIS feature ID: 1584117
- Website: townofscottlincolnwi.gov

Scott is a town in Lincoln County, Wisconsin, United States. The population was 1,377 at the 2020 census, down from 1,432 at the 2010 census.

== History ==
The town is named for Thomas B. Scott, who served in the Wisconsin State Senate from 1873 to 1882.

== Geography ==
Scott is in southern Lincoln County, bordered to the south by Marathon County and to the north by the city of Merrill, the Lincoln county seat. The Wisconsin River forms the eastern border of the town except for where the river passes through Merrill.

According to the United States Census Bureau, the town has a total area of 30.8 square miles (79.8 km^{2}), of which 30.2 square miles (78.1 km^{2}) are land and 0.66 square miles (1.7 km^{2}), or 2.12%, are water.

== Demographics ==
As of the census of 2000, there were 1,287 people, 458 households, and 387 families residing in the town. The population density was 42.7 people per square mile (16.5/km^{2}). There were 488 housing units at an average density of 16.2 per square mile (6.2/km^{2}). The racial makeup of the town was 98.83% White, 0.16% African American, 0.23% Native American, 0.08% Asian, and 0.7% from two or more races. Hispanic or Latino people of any race were 0.47% of the population.

There were 458 households, out of which 36.7% had children under the age of 18 living with them, 75.3% were married couples living together, 4.4% had a female householder with no husband present, and 15.5% were non-families. 12.7% of all households were made up of individuals, and 4.4% had someone living alone who was 65 years of age or older. The average household size was 2.81 and the average family size was 3.05.

In the town, the population was spread out, with 25.3% under the age of 18, 8% from 18 to 24, 31.9% from 25 to 44, 24.6% from 45 to 64, and 10.2% who were 65 years of age or older. The median age was 37 years. For every 100 females, there were 102.7 males. For every 100 females age 18 and over, there were 103.8 males.

The median income for a household in the town was $50,441, and the median income for a family was $54,922. Males had a median income of $35,238 versus $21,667 for females. The per capita income for the town was $19,759. About 2.2% of families and 4.6% of the population were below the poverty line, including 4% of those under age 18 and 10.8% of those age 65 or over.
