= Francis Steffen =

American politician

- Born: November 5, 1836; Orenhofen, Rhenish Palatinate, Prussia
- Died: December 15, 1879 (aged 43)

Francis Steffen (November 5, 1836 – December 15, 1879) was an American farmer from Hortonville, Wisconsin who spent two terms as a member of the Wisconsin State Assembly from Outagamie County, being elected first as a "Reform Democrat" and then re-elected as a Democrat.

== Background ==
Steffen was born in Orenhofen, Rhenish Palatinate, Prussia on November 5, 1836. He received a common school education, and became a farmer by occupation. With his family he emigrated to the United States in 1848, and settled for a while in Schuylerville, New York, before coming to Wisconsin in 1852 with his parents, who settled in Hortonville.

== Service in the American Civil War ==
Steffen entered the 32nd Wisconsin Volunteer Infantry Regiment in August, 1862; was with Ulysses S Grant in the Vicksburg Campaign in 1862–63; marched with William Tecumseh Sherman on the Meridian, Mississippi campaign in 1864: took part at the Siege of Atlanta and the Battle of Jonesborough; marched with Sherman to the sea and into South and North Carolina; took part in all the engagements with the command; marched through Washington, took part in the Grand Review of the Armies in May, 1865, and in June 1865 was mustered out.

After the war he married Isabella McMurdo Steffen (1845–1926), born in New Brunswick but raised in Hortonville. She was the widow of his youngest brother Jacob, who had fallen in action in Vicksburg, Mississippi in 1864.

== Public office ==
Steffen held various local offices, having been five times elected chairman of his town without opposition. In 1858 he was elected county coroner as a Democrat. He was elected clerk of the circuit court in 1866, and chairman of the county board of supervisors in 1877. He was elected as a member of the assembly in 1877 as a "Reform Democrat", receiving 1,011 votes to 818 for Greenbacker W. D. Jordan (Democratic incumbent John James Knowlton was not a candidate for re-election); and re-elected as a Democrat for 1878, receiving 1,256 votes against 297 for Republican Dr. L. Tabor and 593 for the Greenback Jordan.

He was not a candidate for re-election in 1879, and was succeeded by his Republican brother-in-law James McMurdo.
