= Otto Laverrenz =

American politician

Otto Laverrenz (born January 2, 1844, in Berlin, Prussia) was elected to the Wisconsin State Assembly in 1880. He was a Republican. From Milwaukee, Wisconsin, Laverrenz was a paper box manufacturer and a book binder.
