= Jacob H. Muckerheide =

American politician

Jacob H. Muckerheide was a member of the Wisconsin State Assembly.

== Biography ==
Muckerheide was born in Wildeshausen, then in the Grand Duchy of Oldenburg. Sources have differed on the date. He died on October 9, 1885, in Kewaskum (town), Wisconsin.

== Career ==
Muckerheide was a member of the Assembly in 1879. He was a Democrat.
