= Charles Phillips (Wisconsin politician, born 1824) =

19th century American politician

Charles H. Phillips

Member of the Wisconsin Senate from the 23rd district
- In office January 1, 1879
- Preceded by: William W. Reed
- Succeeded by: Joseph Bray Bennett

Member of the Wisconsin State Assembly from the Jefferson 2nd district
- In office January 3, 1876 – January 7, 1878
- Preceded by: Austin Kellogg
- Succeeded by: John Dwight Bullock
- In office January 3, 1870 – January 2, 1871
- Preceded by: Sylvester J. Conklin
- Succeeded by: William Lawrence Hoskins

Personal details
- Born: February 21, 1824 Westmoreland, New York, U.S.
- Died: January 1, 1879 (aged 54) Lake Mills, Wisconsin, U.S.
- Resting place: Rock Lake Cemetery, Lake Mills, Wisconsin
- Party: Republican
- Spouse: Mary E. Butterfield (m. 1857–1879)

Charles Henry Phillips (February 21, 1824 – January 1, 1879) was an American farmer, politician, and Wisconsin pioneer. He served three terms in the Wisconsin State Assembly, representing Jefferson County, and was elected to the Wisconsin State Senate, but died before the start of the legislative session.

== Biography ==
Phillips was born Charles Henry Phillips on February 21, 1824, in Westmoreland, New York. He moved to Lake Mills, Wisconsin, in 1849. Phillips was a farmer and livestock dealer. He was elected to the Wisconsin State Assembly for the 1870, 1876, and 1877 sessions, running on the Republican Party ticket.

He was elected to the Wisconsin State Senate in the 1878 general election, but died on January 1, 1879, technically the first day of his term, but before the start of the legislative session.

== Electoral history ==
=== Wisconsin Assembly (1869) ===
Wisconsin Assembly, Jefferson 2nd District Election, 1869
Party	Candidate	Votes	%	±%
General Election, November 2, 1869
Republican	Charles H. Phillips	614	52.79%	
Democratic	John D. Waterbury	549	47.21%	
Plurality		65	5.59%	
Total votes		1,163	100.0%	
Republican hold				

=== Wisconsin Assembly (1875, 1876) ===
Wisconsin Assembly, Jefferson 2nd District Election, 1875
Party	Candidate	Votes	%	±%
General Election, November 2, 1875
Republican	Charles H. Phillips	771	50.49%	
Democratic	Mark R. Clapp	756	49.51%	
Plurality		15	0.98%	
Total votes		1,527	100.0%	
Republican gain from Democratic				

Wisconsin Assembly, Jefferson 2nd District Election, 1876
Party	Candidate	Votes	%	±%
General Election, November 7, 1876
Republican	Charles H. Phillips (incumbent)	1,088	55.14%	+4.65%
Democratic	William W. Woodman	885	44.86%	
Plurality		203	10.29%	+9.31%
Total votes		1,973	100.0%	+29.21%
Republican hold				

=== Wisconsin Senate (1878) ===
Wisconsin Senate, 23rd District Election, 1878
Party	Candidate	Votes	%	±%
General Election, November 5, 1878
Republican	Charles H. Phillips	3,546	58.74%	+14.84%
Democratic	J. K. Ryder	2,098	34.75%	
Greenback	George W. Bishop	393	6.51%	
Plurality		1,448	23.99%	+11.79%
Total votes		6,037	100.0%	-13.67%
Republican gain from Liberal Republican				

Wisconsin State Assembly
Preceded by Sylvester J. Conklin	Member of the Wisconsin State Assembly from the Jefferson 2nd district January 3, 1870 – January 2, 1871	Succeeded by William Lawrence Hoskins
Preceded by Austin Kellogg	Member of the Wisconsin State Assembly from the Jefferson 2nd district January 3, 1876 – January 7, 1878	Succeeded by John Dwight Bullock
Wisconsin Senate
Preceded by William W. Reed	Member of the Wisconsin Senate from the 23rd district January 1, 1879	Succeeded by Joseph Bray Bennett
