= Frederick Kusel =

American politician and businessman

Frederick Kusel (November 1, 1839 – August 6, 1916) was an American politician and businessman.

Born in the Grand Duchy of Mecklenburg, Germany, Kusel emigrated with his family in 1849 to the United States and settled in Watertown, Wisconsin. Kusel was in the retail hardware business with his family. During the American Civil War, Kusel served in the 20th Wisconsin Volunteer Infantry Regiment and was commissioned captain of the regiment. Kusel served on the Watertown Common Council. He also served as Mayor of Watertown. In 1881 and 1882, Kusel served in the Wisconsin State Senate and was a Democrat. Kusel died at his home in Watertown, Wisconsin.
