= Elihu Bailey =

American politician

Elihu Bailey (December 15, 1817 in Warren Township, Belmont County, Ohio – September 30, 1898 in Richland Center, Wisconsin) was an American politician. He was a member of the Wisconsin State Assembly.

== Biography ==
Bailey was born on December 15, 1817, in Warren Township, Belmont County, Ohio. In 1856, he settled in Marshall, Richland County, Wisconsin. He was a preacher of the Methodist Episcopal Church and a teacher.

== Political career ==
Bailey was a Republican member of the assembly during the 1861, 1871, 1877 and 1879 sessions. Additionally, Bailey was chairman (similar to mayor) of Marshall and a justice of the peace. In 1860, he was a candidate for vlerk of Richland County, Wisconsin. Previously, he had been a candidate for the Ohio General Assembly on multiple occasions as a member of the Liberty Party.
