= A. H. F. Krueger =

American politician

Andreas Heinrich Friederich Krüger (July 21, 1823 – July 6, 1904) was a German-American politician who was a member of the Wisconsin State Assembly.

== Biography ==
Krueger was born in 1823 in Crivitz, Grand Duchy of Mecklenburg-Schwerin, and immigrated in 1848. He was a miller by trade.

== Political career ==
Krueger was a member of the Assembly during the 1880 and 1882 sessions. He was a Democrat.

He served as mayor of Neenah, Wisconsin for four terms.
