= George R. Allen =

American politician

Member of the Wisconsin State Assembly
- In office 1880–1880

Personal details
- Born: August 9, 1838 Hartford, New York, US
- Died: March 20, 1901 (aged 62) Lake Geneva, Wisconsin, US
- Party: Republican

George R. Allen was a member of the Wisconsin State Assembly.

== Biography ==
Allen was born on August 9, 1838, in Hartford, New York. He died on December 20, 1901, in Lake Geneva, Wisconsin, and was buried there.

== Assembly career ==
Allen was a member of the Assembly in 1880. He was a Republican.
