= James Barry (Wisconsin politician) =

Member of the Wisconsin State Assembly

James Barry was a member of the Wisconsin State Assembly.

== Biography ==
Barry was born on March 17, 1812, in County Londonderry, Ireland. He was a member of the United Presbyterian Church of North America. On January 22, 1836, he married Elizabeth Porter. Barry died on November 12, 1883.

== Career ==
Barry was a member of the Wisconsin State Assembly during the 1879 session. Other positions he held include chairman of the Town of Pepin and member of the Pepin County, Wisconsin Board of Supervisors. He was a Republican.
