= Albert L. Mason =

American politician (1824–1896)

- Born: August 1824
- Died: March 26, 1896 (aged 71)
- Political party: Republican
- Spouse: Sophronia Joiner (m. 1847)
- Father: Darius B. Mason

Albert L. Mason (August 1824 – March 26, 1896) was an American politician who served as a Republican member of the Wisconsin State Assembly.

His father, Darius B. Mason, would become a member of the county board of Walworth County, Wisconsin. Albert married Sophronia Joiner in 1847.

== Career ==
Mason was a member of the Assembly in 1879. Other positions he held include postmaster and justice of the peace.
