= Henry P. Fischer =

American politician

Henry Fischer (October 16, 1843 – 1912) was a member of the Wisconsin State Assembly.

== Biography ==
Fischer was born on October 16, 1843, in Chicago. After the outbreak of the American Civil War, he enlisted with the 2nd Missouri Volunteer Infantry (3 months, 1861) and later the 2nd Missouri Volunteer Infantry of the Union Army. Conflicts he took part in include the Camp Jackson Affair, the Battle of Boonville, the Battle of Pea Ridge, as well as the Battle of Perryville. During the Battle of Perryville, Fischer was severely wounded by a gunshot to the leg. As a result, he was discharged. The following year, he moved to Milwaukee, Wisconsin, and re-enlisted in the Army with the Veteran Reserve Corps. Fischer died in 1912. He was buried at Forest Home Cemetery.

== Assembly career ==
Fischer was a member of the Assembly in 1879. He was a Republican.

== See also ==
- Henry P. Fischer at Find a Grave
