= Michael Thelen =

American politician

Michael Thelen (April 10, 1834 – 1918) was a member of the Wisconsin State Assembly during the 1879 session.

Thelen was born on April 10, 1834, in Germany. He died in 1918.

== Political career ==
He was a Democrat, and he represented the 4th District of Fond du Lac County, Wisconsin. In 1886, he served on a state tax commission.
