= Thomas Greening =

English cricketer

Thomas Greening (1882 – 25 March 1956) was an English first-class cricketer who played in two matches for Warwickshire in 1912. He was born in Stockton-on-Tees, County Durham, though the precise date of his birth is not known, and died at Leamington Spa, Warwickshire.

In his limited first-class cricket career, Greening was a lower-order right-handed batsman and a right-arm off-break bowler. He played two matches in a week, batting twice (one time not out) and scoring 26 runs, and he took one wicket, that of the Derbyshire opening batsman Leonard Oliver. Wisden Cricketers' Almanack for 1913 identifies him as an amateur, and calls him "Mr T. J. Greening". He played club cricket for Coventry and North Warwickshire Cricket Club into the 1930s.
