= Adell, Wisconsin =

- Village
- Location of Adell in Sheboygan County, Wisconsin.
- Coordinates: 43°37′6″N 87°57′5″W
- Country: United States
- State: Wisconsin
- County: Sheboygan

Area
  - Total: 0.57 sq mi (1.48 km^{2})
  - Land: 0.56 sq mi (1.44 km^{2})
  - Water: 0.012 sq mi (0.03 km^{2})
- Elevation: 906 ft (276 m)

Population (2020)
  - Total: 498
  - Density: 896/sq mi (346/km^{2})
- Time zone: UTC-6 (Central (CST))
  - Summer (DST): UTC-5 (CDT)
- Area code: 920
- FIPS code: 55-00450
- GNIS feature ID: 1560695
- Website: Village of Adell

Adell is a village in Sheboygan County, Wisconsin, United States. The population was 498 at the 2020 census. It is included in the Sheboygan, Wisconsin Metropolitan Statistical Area.

== History ==
Originally called Sherman's Station after the town was laid out around a depot after an 1855 land purchase, the name Adell came about after a post office that used to operate in the area.

== Geography ==
According to the United States Census Bureau, the village has a total area of 0.57 square miles (1.48 km^{2}), of which 0.56 square miles (1.45 km^{2}) is land and 0.01 square miles (0.03 km^{2}) is water.

== Demographics ==
Historical population
Census	Pop.	Note	%±
1920	246		—
1930	262		6.5%
1940	313		19.5%
1950	366		16.9%
1960	398		8.7%
1970	380		−4.5%
1980	545		43.4%
1990	510		−6.4%
2000	517		1.4%
2010	516		−0.2%
2020	498		−3.5%
U.S. Decennial Census

=== 2020 census ===
Adell village, Wisconsin – Racial and ethnic composition Note: the US Census treats Hispanic/Latino as an ethnic category. This table excludes Latinos from the racial categories and assigns them to a separate category. Hispanics/Latinos may be of any race.
Race / Ethnicity (NH = Non-Hispanic)	Pop 2000	Pop 2010	Pop 2020	% 2000	% 2010	% 2020
White alone (NH)	494	477	440	95.55%	92.44%	88.35%
Black or African American alone (NH)	0	1	1	0.00%	0.19%	0.20%
Native American or Alaska Native alone (NH)	1	1	2	0.19%	0.19%	0.40%
Asian alone (NH)	2	10	4	0.39%	1.94%	0.80%
Pacific Islander alone (NH)	1	0	0	0.19%	0.00%	0.00%
Other race alone (NH)	0	0	3	0.00%	0.00%	0.60%
Mixed race or Multiracial (NH)	7	9	15	1.35%	1.74%	3.01%
Hispanic or Latino (any race)	12	18	33	2.32%	3.49%	6.63%
Total	517	516	498	100.00%	100.00%	100.00%

=== 2010 census ===
At the 2010 census, there were 516 people, 210 households and 146 families living in the village. The population density was 921.4 inhabitants per square mile (355.8/km^{2}). There were 224 housing units at an average density of 400.0 per square mile (154.4/km^{2}). The racial makeup of the village was 95.3% White, 0.2% African American, 0.2% Native American, 1.9% Asian, 0.4% from other races, and 1.9% from two or more races. Hispanic or Latino of any race were 3.5% of the population.

There were 210 households, of which 30.0% had children under the age of 18 living with them, 51.9% were married couples living together, 11.0% had a female householder with no husband present, 6.7% had a male householder with no wife present, and 30.5% were non-families. 22.9% of all households were made up of individuals, and 8.5% had someone living alone who was 65 years of age or older. The average household size was 2.46 and the average family size was 2.90.

The median age in the village was 41.3 years. 23.3% of residents were under the age of 18; 5.6% were between the ages of 18 and 24; 28.1% were from 25 to 44; 27.4% were from 45 to 64; and 15.7% were 65 years of age or older. The gender makeup of the village was 51.0% male and 49.0% female.

=== 2000 census ===
At the 2000 census, of 2000, there were 517 people, 207 households and 144 families living in the village. The population density was 1,019.5 per square mile (391.4/km^{2}). There were 216 housing units at an average density of 426.0 per square mile (163.5/km^{2}). The racial makeup of the village was 97.49% White, 0.19% Native American, 0.39% Asian, 0.19% Pacific Islander, 0.39% from other races, and 1.35% from two or more races. Hispanic or Latino of any race were 2.32% of the population.

There were 207 households, of which 32.9% had children under the age of 18 living with them, 54.1% were married couples living together, 9.2% had a female householder with no husband present, and 30.0% were non-families. 23.7% of all households were made up of individuals, and 10.6% had someone living alone who was 65 years of age or older. The average household size was 2.50 and the average family size was 2.97.

25.9% of the population were under the age of 18, 9.9% from 18 to 24, 27.9% from 25 to 44, 23.6% from 45 to 64, and 12.8% who were 65 years of age or older. The median age was 35 years. For every 100 females, there were 103.5 males. For every 100 females age 18 and over, there were 104.8 males.

The median household income was $51,000 and the median family income was $55,179. Males had a median income of $40,104 and females $24,659. The per capita income was $21,166. About 2.8% of families and 3.6% of the population were below the poverty line, including 5.4% of those under age 18 and none of those age 65 or over.

== Notable people ==
- James Allan, Jr., Wisconsin State Representative, lived in Adell.
- Hildegarde, American cabaret singer, was born in Adell.

== Images ==
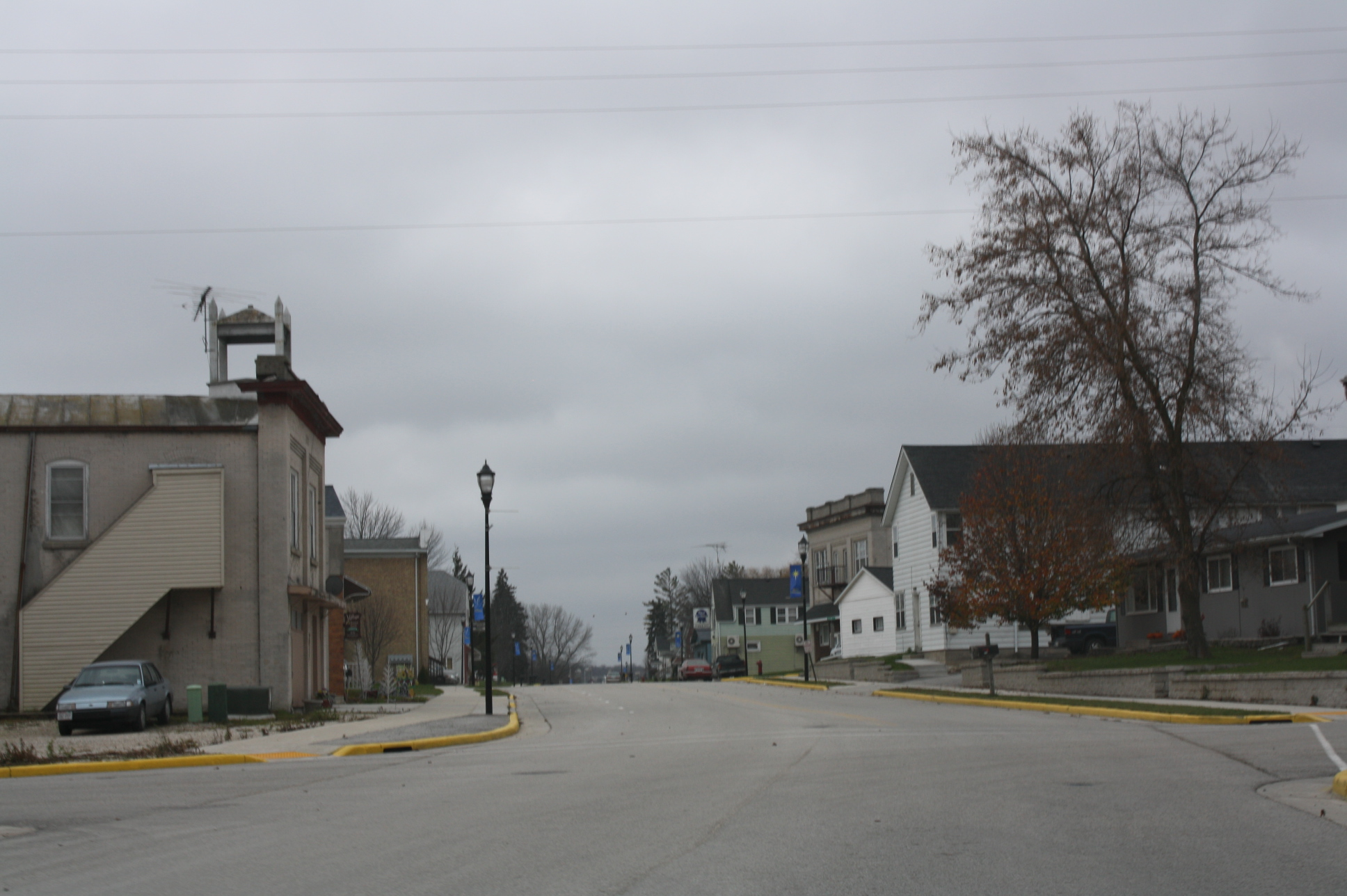
Downtown Adell

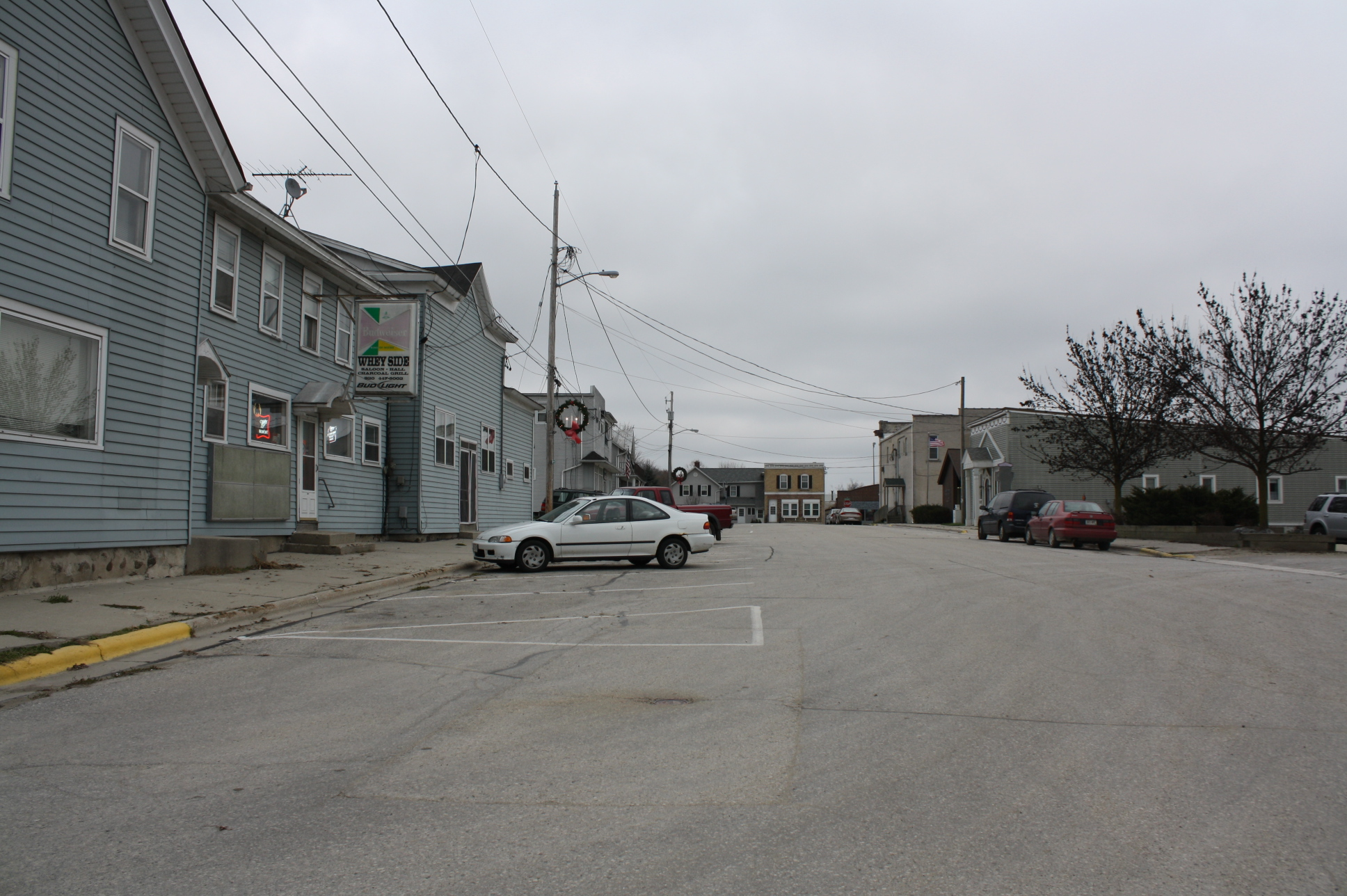
Downtown Adell

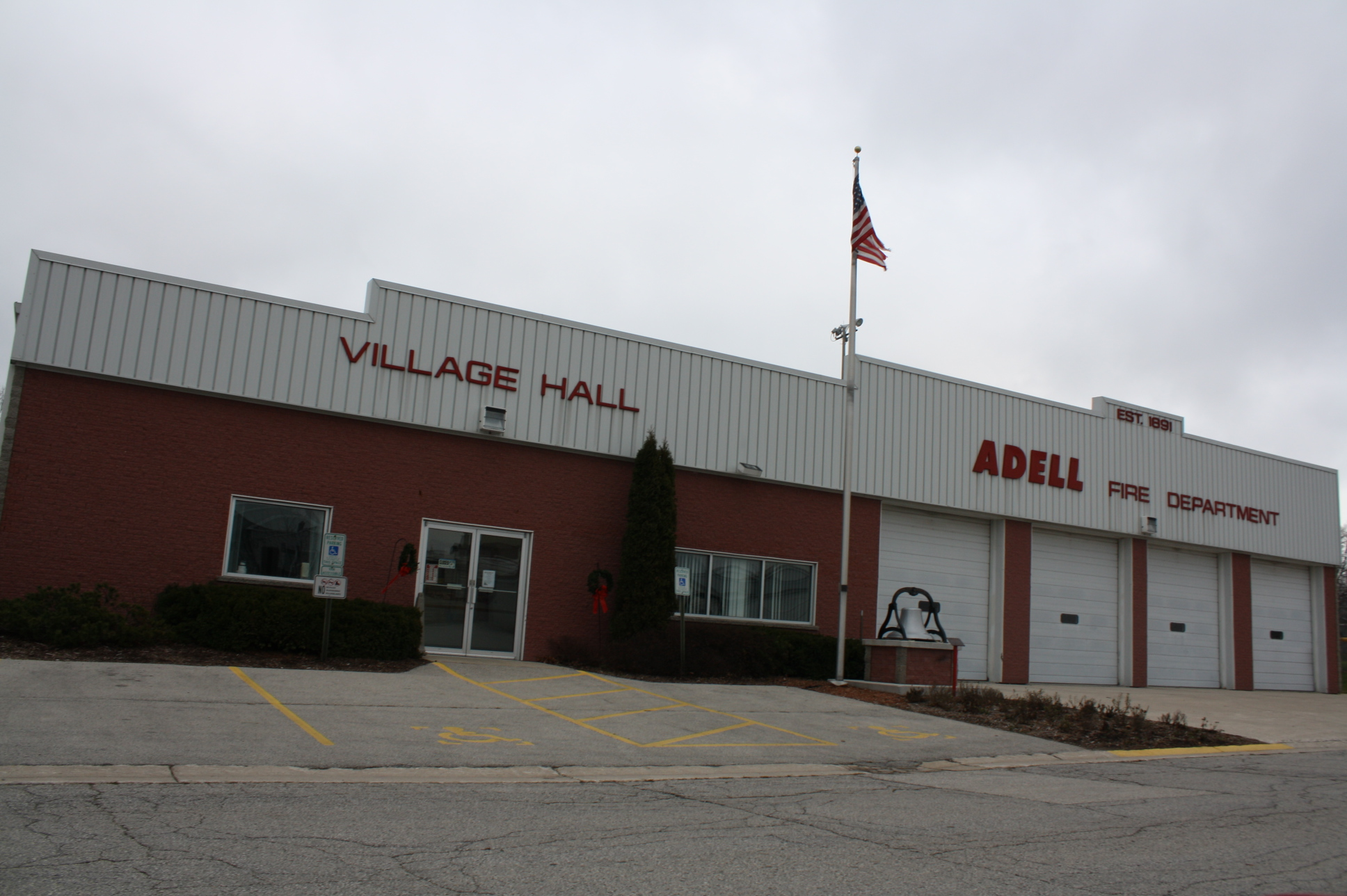
Village hall and fire station

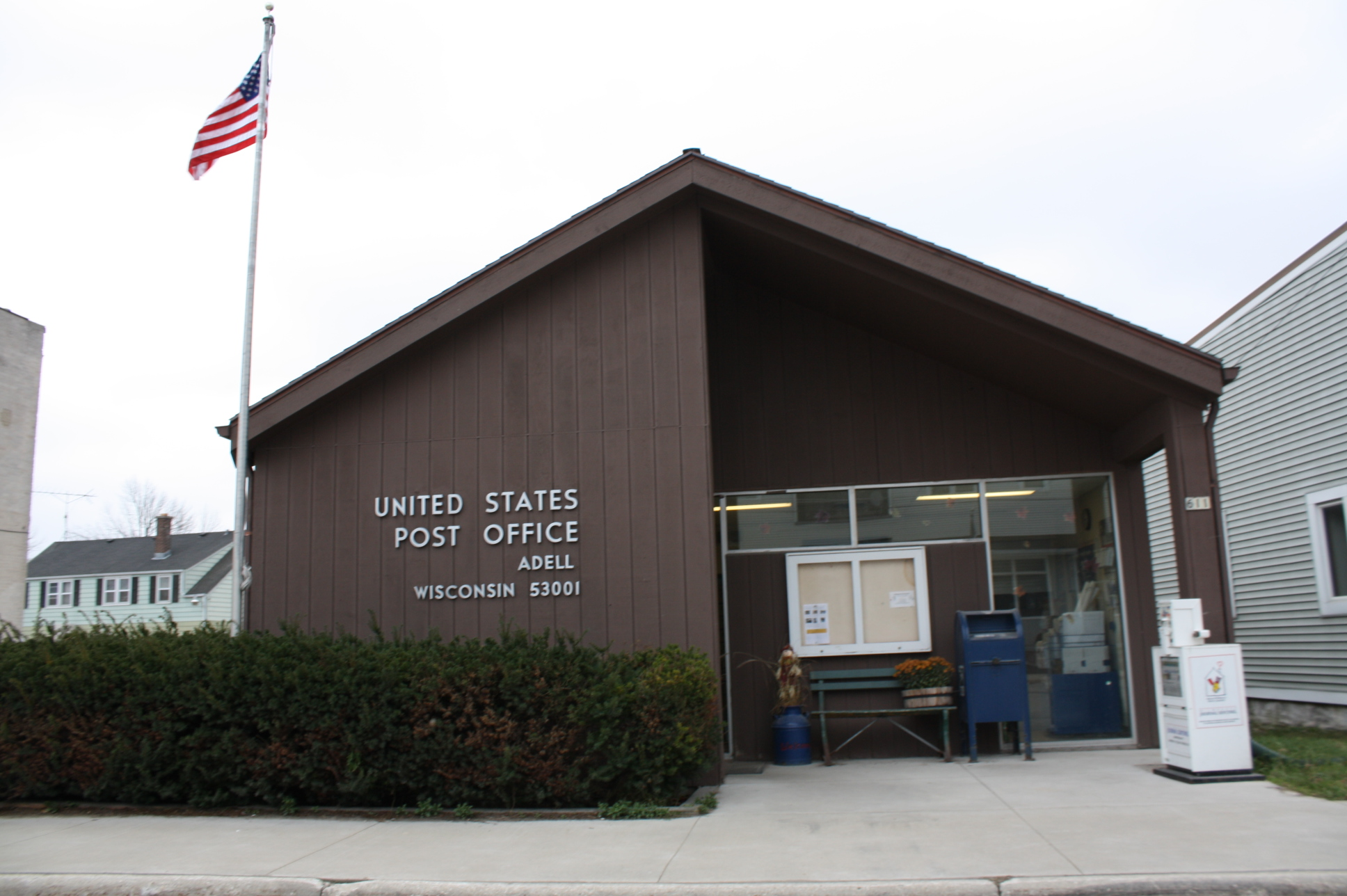
Post office

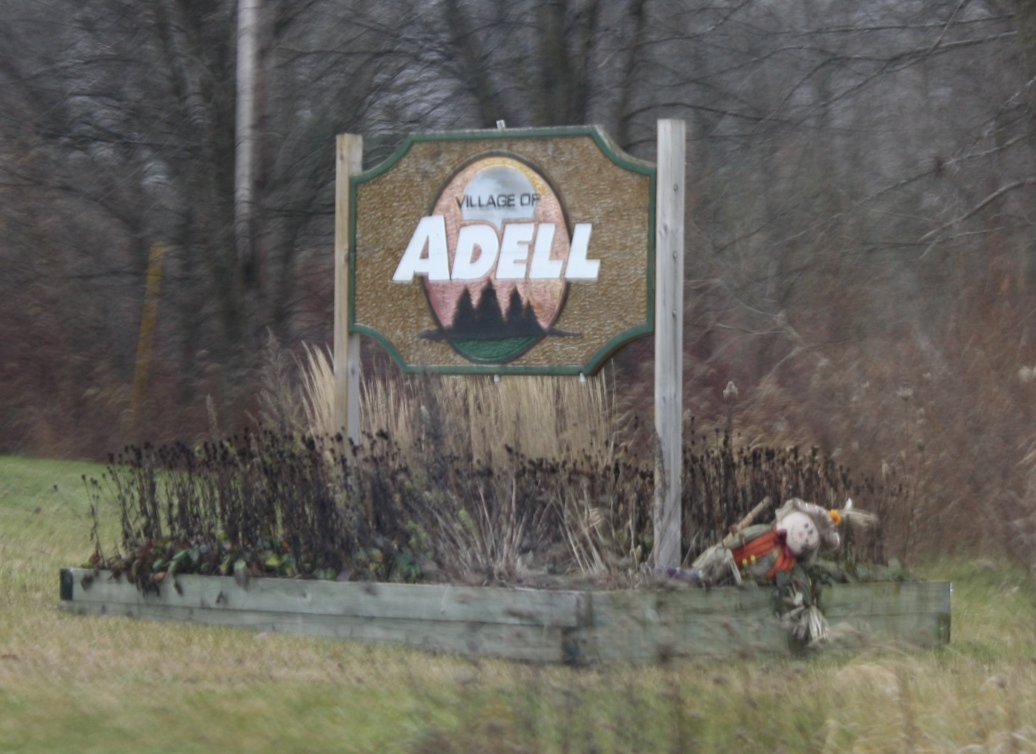
Welcome sign

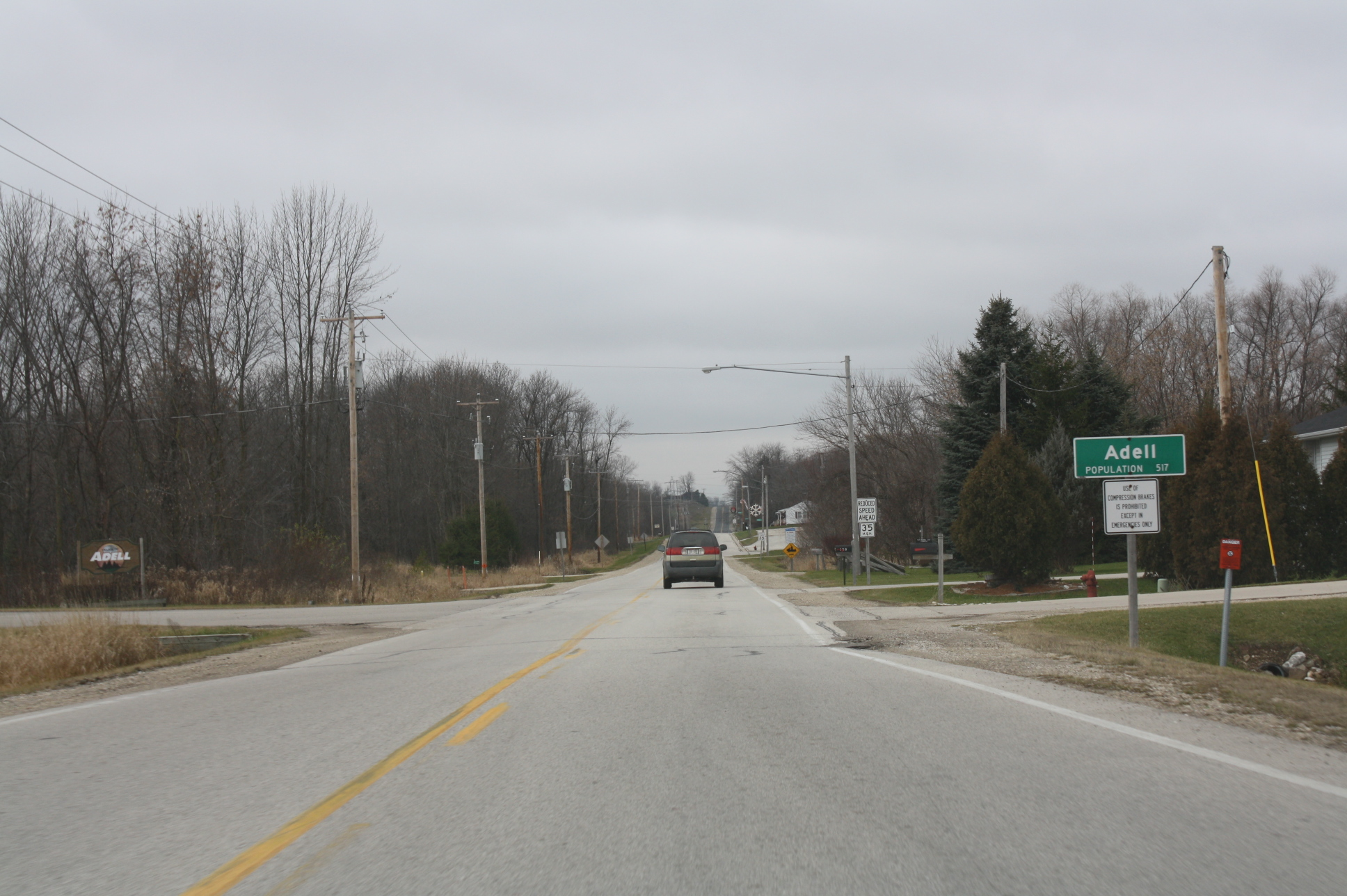
Sign

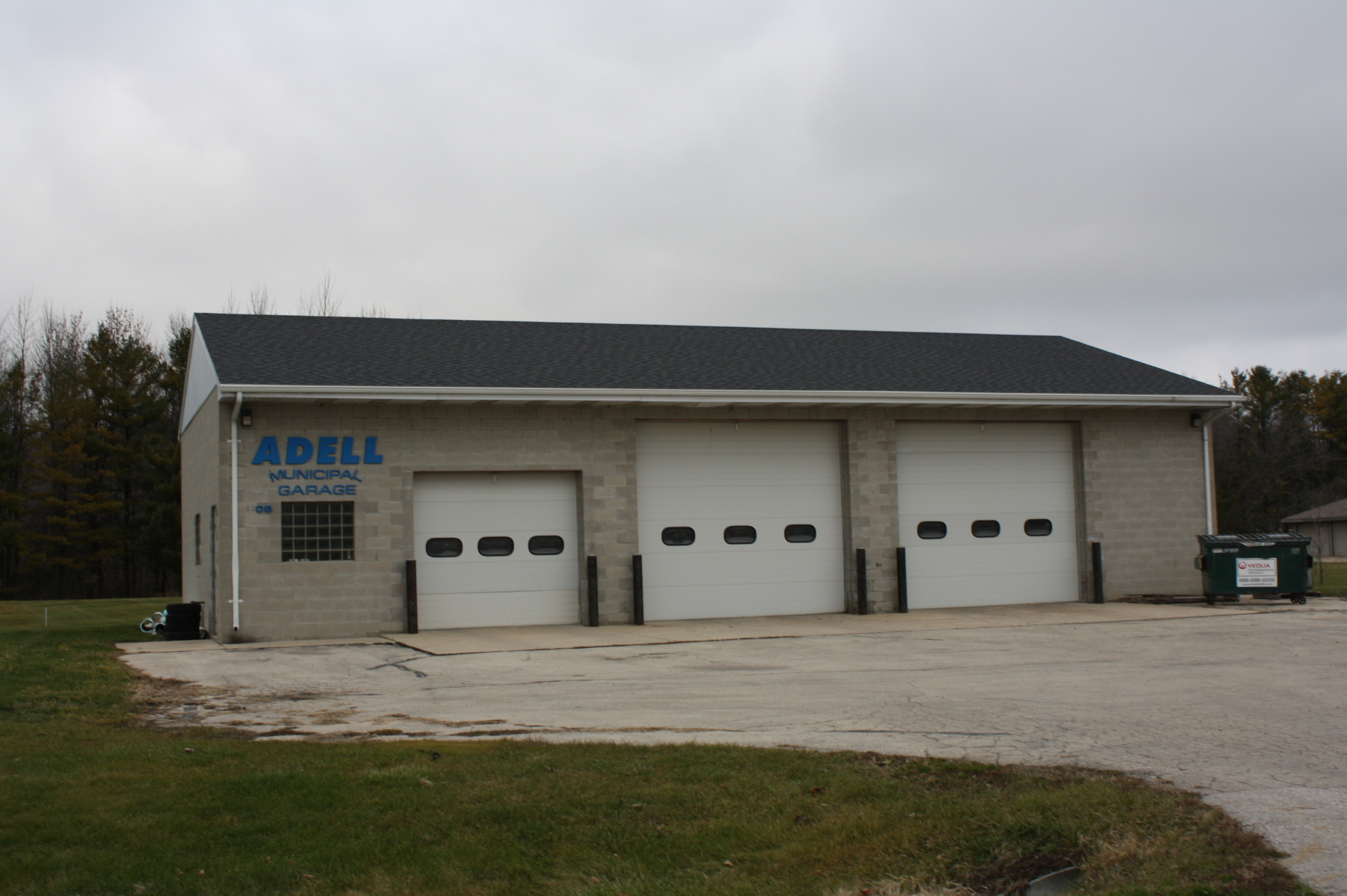
Municipal garage

== See also ==
- List of villages in Wisconsin
