= John Ruch =

American politician

John Ruch was a member of the Wisconsin State Assembly.

Ruch was born Massillon, Ohio. On October 24, 1858, he married Emma Buchanan. Ruch was a member of the Wisconsin State Assembly in 1880.
