= Klock Site =

- U.S. National Register of Historic Places
- Nearest city: Ephratah, New York
- Area: 4 acres (1.6 ha)
- NRHP reference No.: 80002614
- Added to NRHP: July 22, 1980

Klock Site is an archaeological site located at Ephratah in Fulton County, New York. It is also known as Las. 8-4, New York State Office of Parks, Recreation, and Historic Preservation Unique Site No. A035-04-0005. It is one of three Mohawk village sites excavated by archaeologist Robert E. Funk in 1969-1970.

The site has been dated to 1540–1565. The National Register listing gives a size of 2.3 hectares (5.7 acres), but the actual village area has been estimated at 1.2 hectares (3.0 acres), containing the remains of ten longhouses, housing around 720–900 people.

It was listed on the National Register of Historic Places in 1980.
