= William Small (Wisconsin politician) =

American politician

William Small (October 5, 1824 – February 9, 1900) was a member of the Wisconsin State Assembly.

== Biography ==
Small was born in Perthshire, Scotland. On November 27, 1856, he married Margaret Marshall (1819–1900). They had a son. He was a member of the Assembly in 1880. Other positions he held include Assessor of Lisbon, Waukesha County, Wisconsin. He was a Republican.
