= James Allan Jr. =

American politician

Member of the Wisconsin State Assembly
- In office 1879–1879

Personal details
- Born: January 18, 1845 Brooklyn, New York, US
- Died: September 1, 1932 (aged 87) Vienna, Virginia, US

James Allan Jr. (January 18, 1845 - September 1, 1932) was a member of the Wisconsin State Assembly.

== Biography ==
Allan was born on January 18, 1845, in Brooklyn, New York. During the American Civil War, he served with the 27th Wisconsin Volunteer Infantry Regiment of the Union Army, achieving the rank of sergeant. Events he took part in include the Siege of Vicksburg, the Battle of Jenkins' Ferry, and the Battle of Spanish Fort. He died in Vienna, Virginia, on September 1, 1932, and was interred in Arlington National Cemetery.

== Political career ==
Allan was a member of the Assembly in 1879. Other positions he held include Postmaster of Adell, Wisconsin, and justice of the peace. He was a Republican.
