= William Fleming (Wisconsin politician) =

American politician (1851-1933)

Member of the Wisconsin State Assembly
- In office 1879–1880

Personal details
- Born: February 6, 1851 Emmet, Wisconsin, US
- Died: 1933 (aged 81–82)
- Party: Democrat

William Fleming (February 6, 1851 – 1933) was a member of the Wisconsin State Assembly in 1879 and 1880. He was a Democrat.

== Biography ==
Fleming was born on February 6, 1851, in Emmet, Dodge County, Wisconsin, to John and Catherine (Sweeney) Fleming, who settled in the town in 1844. Professions he held include schoolteacher. He was elected to represent Dodge County in the Wisconsin State Assembly in 1879 and 1880. He was also the deputy clerk of the Dodge County court from 1882 to 1884 and the Dodge County clerk from 1884 to 1886. In 1887, he was stationed in Fort Wrangel, Alaska, as a deputy collector of customs. After he returned from Alaska, he moved to Oconomowoc, Wisconsin, in December 1893, and became a lawyer. He died in 1933.
