= William M. Fogo =

American politician

William Montgomery Fogo (June 18, 1841 – August 1, 1903) was an American newspaper editor and politician.

Born in Columbiana County, Ohio, Fogo and his parents moved to the town of Marshall, Richland County, Wisconsin. Marshall served in the 33rd Wisconsin Volunteer Infantry Regiment during the American Civil War. In 1873, Fogo became the editor of the Republican Observer newspaper in Richland Center, Wisconsin. In 1897 and 1899, Fogo served in the Wisconsin State Assembly as a Republican. Fogo died in Richland Center, Wisconsin having been in poor health.
