= Jacob Eckhardt =

Jacob Eckhardt (February 7, 1835 – November 1, 1881) was a member of the Wisconsin State Assembly during the 1879 and 1880 sessions. Eckhardt was born on February 7, 1835. He was a Republican.

Eckhardt was badly wounded in a shooting in 1874. He died unexpectedly in Milwaukee, Wisconsin in 1881, and his death was attributed to the old injury.
