= Hiram W. Webster =

American politician

Hiram W. Webster (born 10 January 1824) was an American politician. He was a political figure in Wisconsin in the latter part of the nineteenth century. He was a Republican member of the Wisconsin State Assembly in 1879 and 1880. Webster was born in New York. He was married to Betsey J. Webster (born 1828 in Vermont).
