= Thomas B. Scott =

American politician

Thomas B. Scott (February 8, 1829 – October 7, 1886) was President Pro Tem of the Wisconsin State Senate.

== Biography ==
Scott was born on February 8, 1829, in Roxburghshire, Scotland. He apparently settled in Dekorra, Wisconsin, in 1848 and what is now Wisconsin Rapids, Wisconsin, in 1851. He was involved in the lumbering business. Scott married Ann E. Neeves and they had four children. He died of Bright's disease on October 7, 1886.

== Career ==
Scott was a member of the Senate from 1873 to 1882. He was President Pro Tem for two terms. Other positions he held include County Clerk and County Treasurer of Wood County, Wisconsin, a delegate to the 1880 Republican National Convention and Mayor of Merrill, Wisconsin. The town of Scott in Lincoln County was named in his honor.
