= James McMurdo =

American politician

James Hunter McMurdo (1836–1904) was a member of the Wisconsin State Assembly.

== Biography ==
McMurdo was born on September 1, 1836, in Pennfield Parish, New Brunswick. During the American Civil War, he served with the 44th Wisconsin Volunteer Infantry Regiment of the Union Army and would take part in the Battle of Nashville. He achieved the rank of corporal. McMurdo died on August 4, 1904.

== Assembly career ==
McMurdo was a member of the Assembly during the 1880 and 1881 sessions, succeeding his brother-in-law Francis Steffen. He was a Republican.
