= Knud Adland =

American politician

Member of the Wisconsin Assembly
- In office 1879–1879

Personal details
- Born: February 15, 1829 Hordaland, Norway
- Died: May 5, 1912 (aged 83) Chicago, Illinois
- Spouse: Phoebe Draught
- Children: 8

Knud Adland (February 15, 1829 – May 5, 1912) was a member of the Wisconsin State Assembly.

== Biography ==
Adland was born near Bergen in Hordaland, Norway. He came to America as a child with his family, settling in Illinois in 1837 and then moving to Racine County, Wisconsin in 1840. He married Phoebe (Drought) Adland (1834–1899), with whom he had eight children. The family settled in what is now North Cape, Wisconsin, where he was a merchant. He also served as local postmaster, justice of the peace, and chairman of the town board. He was elected a member of the Wisconsin State Assembly in 1879 as a Republican.

Adland died in Chicago, where he was living with one of his sons.
