= Ulrich Hemmi =

American politician

Ulrich Hemmi (June 14, 1829 in Churwalden, Switzerland – June 11, 1895 in Sauk County, Wisconsin), was a member of the Wisconsin State Assembly.

He was married to Elizabeth Joos.

He came to Wisconsin at the age of 19, and settled in the town of Honey Creek. He was elected to the board of Town Supervisors multiple times through his life, and held the offices of Assessor and Treasurer.

== Assembly career ==
Hemmi was a member of the Assembly in 1879. He was a Republican.
