= Philip Greening =

American politician

Philip Greening (February 29, 1824 – October 28, 1906) was an American blacksmith, machinist and farmer from Lamartine, Wisconsin, who spent a single one-year term as a member of the Wisconsin State Assembly from Fond du Lac County. He ran as a "Greenback Democrat".

== Background ==
Greening was born in Lamerton, Devonshire, England on February 29, 1824. He studied in the public schools until he was apprenticed to a blacksmith at the age of fourteen. He took up that trade in his adulthood, eventually moving to Plymouth. In 1849 he sailed from England to Quebec, ending up in Woodstock, Ontario. He married one Mary Gainer on October 13, 1849 in Ingersoll, Ontario, and worked in the Woodstock area for about ten months before emigrating to Wisconsin. He worked in Green Bay for a year and one-half, after which he purchased a large parcel of land in Calumet, which he cleared and farmed for some years. In 1863, he sold his holdings and moved with his family to Winneshiek County, Iowa, farming there for four years before once more selling out and returning to Wisconsin once more, this time to a farm in Byron, which he later sold in favor of a larger parcel in Lamartine.

== Political career ==
In 1860, Greening ran as a Democrat for treasurer of Calumet County. Greening served for four years as chairman of the Town Board of Supervisors, and one year as Assessor. In 1878, he ran as a "Greenback Democrat", although in most districts the two parties opposed each other, in the second Fond du Lac County Assembly district (Towns of Byron, Empire, Fond du Lac, Friendship, Lamartine, Oakfield and Waupun, and the North Ward of the Village of Waupun). He won with 1,046 votes, against 897 for Republican Delos Allen (Republican incumbent Almon Swan was not a candidate). He was assigned to the standing committee on lumbering and manufactures. He did not seek re-election, and was succeeded by Republican Daniel Treleven, who faced separate Democratic and Greenback challengers. An 1889 account says that he was nominated for the Wisconsin State Senate in 1880, but declined the nomination (it does not say by which party or parties); and that he remained affiliated with the Democratic party in later years.

== After the Assembly ==
After the Assembly, he returned to farming. As of 1889, he and Mary had had six children, of whom only two (Ellen and William) survived.
