= John Dwight Bullock =

American politician (1836–1914)

John Dwight Bullock (1836–1914) was a member of the Wisconsin State Assembly.

== Biography ==
Bullock was born on August 5, 1836, in Ephratah, New York. He moved to Johnson Creek, Wisconsin, in 1861.

== Career ==
Bullock was a member of the Assembly during the 1878, 1879, 1880 and 1881 sessions. He was a Republican.
