= 31st Wisconsin Legislature =

Wisconsin legislative term for 1878

←	30th	32nd	→
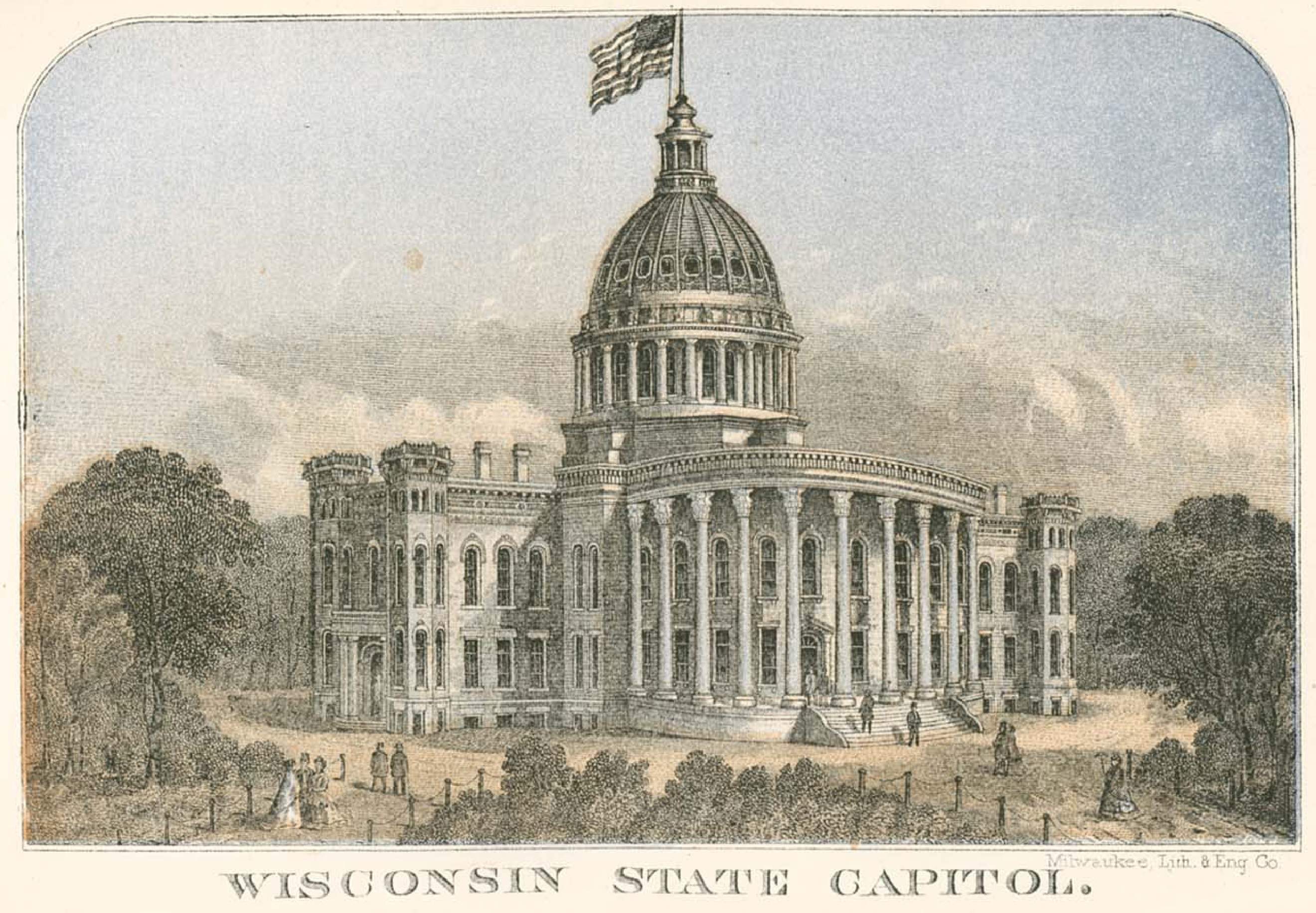
- Wisconsin State Capitol, 1863

Overview
- Legislative body: Wisconsin Legislature
- Meeting place: Wisconsin State Capitol
- Term: January 7, 1878 – January 6, 1879
- Election: November 6, 1877

Senate
- Members: 33
- Senate President: James M. Bingham (R)
- President pro tempore: Levi W. Barden (R)
- Party control: Republican

Assembly
- Members: 100
- Assembly Speaker: Augustus Barrows (GB)
- Party control: Democratic

Sessions
- 1st: January 9, 1878 – March 21, 1878

Special sessions
- June Special: June 4, 1878 – June 7, 1878

The Thirty-First Wisconsin Legislature convened from January 9, 1878, to March 21, 1878, in regular session, and later re-convened from June 4 to June 7, 1878, in special session, to complete the revision of the statutes. This was the first extra session of the Wisconsin Legislature since 1862.

This was the first and only session of the Legislature to have an Assembly speaker from the Greenback Party—Augustus Barrows. Despite the Greenbackers holding only 13% of the Assembly seats, neither major party had enough seats to form a majority without Greenback support. The Democrats thus formed a coalition with the Greenbacks for the 31st Legislature with Barrows acting as speaker.

Senators representing even-numbered districts were newly elected for this session and were serving the first year of a two-year term. Assembly members were elected to a one-year term. Assembly members and even-numbered senators were elected in the general election of November 6, 1877. Senators representing odd-numbered districts were serving the second year of their two-year term, having been elected in the general election held on November 7, 1876.

The governor of Wisconsin during this entire term was Republican William E. Smith, of Milwaukee County, serving the first year of a two-year term, having won election in the 1877 Wisconsin gubernatorial election.

== Major events ==
- January 7, 1878: Inauguration of William E. Smith as the 14th Governor of Wisconsin.
- February 7, 1878: Pope Pius IX died at the Apostolic Palace in Vatican City.
- February 28, 1878: The Bland–Allison Act became law in the United States, with the United States Congress overriding the veto of President Rutherford B. Hayes. The act restored the monetary status of silver coins, a key priority of the Free silver movement.
- March 3, 1878: Cardinal Vincenzo Gioacchino Raffaele Luigi Pecci was crowned Pope Leo XIII.
- March 3, 1878: The Treaty of San Stefano was signed, ending the Russo-Turkish War of 1877–1878 and establishing an independent Principality of Bulgaria.
- April 29, 1878: U.S. President Rutherford B. Hayes signed the National Quarantine Act of 1878, which created regulations to prevent the introduction of contagious diseases into the United States. The law also established the Marine Hospital Service, the forerunner of the United States Public Health Service Commissioned Corps and the National Institutes of Health.
- June 18, 1878: U.S. President Rutherford B. Hayes signed the Posse Comitatus Act, which limited the power of the President to use the United States military to enforce domestic policies.
- July 13, 1878: The Treaty of Berlin (1878) was signed, making Serbia, Montenegro, and Romania completely independent from the Ottoman Empire, confirming the independence of Bulgaria, transferring Cyprus to British control, and allowing Austria-Hungary to garrison the Bosnia Vilayet. The treaty settled regional issues left open by the Treaty of San Stefano.
- October 1, 1878: The United States Supreme Court decided the case Ex parte Jackson, extending Fourth Amendment protections to private letters and packages.

== Major legislation ==
- February 12, 1878: Joint Resolution relating to the remonetization of silver, 1878 Joint Resolution 3. Endorsed congressional action to restore the monetary value of silver currency, and resume minting silver coins.
- March 12, 1878: An Act to amend sections thirty-one and thirty-two of chapter fifty-six, of the general laws of 1870, entitled "An act to provide for the incorporation and government of fire and inland navigation insurance companies." 1878 Act 214. Created the appointed position of state insurance commissioner.
- March 21, 1878: An Act to authorize the granting of state certificates to graduates of the state university, 1878 Act 333. Created a certification process to enable any graduate of the University of Wisconsin to become authorized to work as a teacher at any public school in Wisconsin.

== Party summary ==
=== Senate summary ===
Senate partisan composition Democratic: 10 seats Liberal Republican: 2 seats Republican: 21 seats

	Party (Shading indicates majority caucus)			Total	
	Dem.	Lib.R.	Rep.	Total	Vacant
End of previous Legislature	8	3	22	33	0
1st Session	10	2	21	33	0
Final voting share	36.36%		63.64%		
Beginning of the next Legislature	9	0	23	32	1

=== Assembly summary ===
Assembly partisan composition Democratic: 41 seats Socialist: 1 seat Greenback: 13 seats Republican: 45 seats

	Party (Shading indicates majority caucus)						Total	
	Dem.	Ref.	Soc.	Gbk.	Lib.R.	Rep.	Total	Vacant
End of previous Legislature	32	5	0	0	1	61	100	0
Start of 1st Session	41	0	1	13	0	45	100	0
Final voting share	55%					45%		
Beginning of the next Legislature	25	0	0	9	0	66	100	0

== Sessions ==
- 1st Regular session: January 9, 1878 – March 21, 1878
- June Special session: June 4, 1878 – June 7, 1878

== Leaders ==
=== Senate leadership ===
- President of the Senate: James M. Bingham (R)
- President pro tempore: Levi W. Barden (R)

=== Assembly leadership ===
- Speaker of the Assembly: Augustus Barrows (GB)

== Members ==
=== Members of the Senate ===
Members of the Senate for the Thirty-First Wisconsin Legislature:

Senate partisan representation Democratic: 10 seats Liberal Republican: 2 seats Republican: 21 seats

Dist.	Counties	Senator	Residence	Party
01	Door, Kewaunee, Oconto, & Shawano	George Grimmer	Kewaunee	Rep.
02	Brown	Thomas R. Hudd	Green Bay	Dem.
03	Racine	Thomas A. Bones	Racine	Rep.
04	Crawford & Vernon	George W. Swain	Chaseburg	Rep.
05	Milwaukee (Northern Part)	Isaac W. Van Schaick	Milwaukee	Rep.
06	Milwaukee (Southern Part)	George H. Paul	Milwaukee	Dem.
07	Milwaukee (Central Part)	George A. Abert	Milwaukee	Dem.
08	Kenosha & Walworth	Benoni Reynolds	Geneva	Rep.
09	Green Lake, Marquette, & Waushara	Hobart S. Sacket	Berlin	Rep.
10	Waukesha	John A. Rice	Merton	Dem.
11	Chippewa, Clark, Lincoln, Taylor, & Wood	Thomas B. Scott	Grand Rapids	Rep.
12	Green & Lafayette	Joseph B. Treat	Monroe	Rep.
13	Dodge	Charles H. Williams	Fox Lake	Dem.
14	Juneau & Sauk	David E. Welch	Baraboo	Rep.
15	Manitowoc	Joseph Rankin	Manitowoc	Dem.
16	Grant	Oscar C. Hathaway	Beetown	Rep.
17	Rock	Hamilton Richardson	Janesville	Rep.
18	Fond du Lac (Western Part)	Alonzo A. Loper	Ripon	Rep.
19	Winnebago	Return Torrey	Oshkosh	Rep.
20	Sheboygan & Eastern Fond du Lac	Louis Wolf	Sheboygan Falls	Dem.
21	Marathon, Portage, & Waupaca	Henry Mumbrue	Waupaca	Lib.R.
22	Calumet & Outagamie	George N. Richmond	Appleton	Dem.
23	Jefferson	William W. Reed	Jefferson	Lib.R.
24	Ashland, Barron, Bayfield, Burnett, Douglas, Polk, & St. Croix	Dana Reed Bailey	Baldwin	Rep.
25	Dane (Eastern Part)	George B. Burrows	Madison	Rep.
26	Dane (Western Part)	Matthew Anderson	Cross Plains	Dem.
27	Adams & Columbia	Levi W. Barden	Portage	Rep.
28	Iowa & Richland	Archibald Campbell	Middlebury	Rep.
29	Buffalo, Pepin, & Trempealeau	Alexander A. Arnold	Galesville	Rep.
30	Dunn, Eau Claire, & Pierce	Abraham D. Andrews	River Falls	Rep.
31	La Crosse	Merrick Wing	La Crosse	Rep.
32	Jackson & Monroe	William T. Price	Black River Falls	Rep.
33	Ozaukee & Washington	Philip Schneider	Farmington	Dem.

=== Members of the Assembly ===
Members of the Assembly for the Thirty-First Wisconsin Legislature:

Assembly partisan composition Democratic: 40 seats Socialist: 1 seat Greenback: 13 seats Republican: 45 seats Liberal: 1 seat

Senate District	County	Dist.	Representative	Party	Residence
27	Adams		Solon Pierce	Rep.	Friendship
24	Ashland, Barron, Bayfield, Burnett, Douglas, & Polk		Canute Anderson	Rep.	Grantsburg
02	Brown	1	David M. Kelly	Rep.	Green Bay
02	Brown	2	David M. Burns	Dem.	Fort Howard
02	Brown	3	William Rice	Dem.	Morrison
29	Buffalo & Pepin	1	John J. Senn	Rep.	Fountain City
29	Buffalo & Pepin	2	Vivus W. Dorwin	Rep.	Durand
22	Calumet		J. Hayward Haight	Gbk.	Brothertown
11	Chippewa		Augustus Barrows	Gbk.	Chippewa Falls
11	Clark, Lincoln, Taylor & Wood		Solomon Nason	Gbk.	Nasonville
27	Columbia	1	Josiah D. Arnold	Dem.	Portage
27	Columbia	2	Lester Woodard	Rep.	Pardeeville
04	Crawford		James H. Jewell	Dem.	Freeman
26	Dane	1	John Lyle	Dem.	Montrose
25	Dane	2	Edwin E. Bryant	Rep.	Madison
25	Dane	3	John Ollis	Rep.	Vienna
13	Dodge	1	Carl Dowe	Dem.	Horicon
13	Dodge	2	Peter Langenfeld	Dem.	Theresa
13	Dodge	3	Eli Hawks	Rep.	Juneau
13	Dodge	4	Edward C. McFetridge	Rep.	Beaver Dam
01	Door		Edward S. Minor	Rep.	Fish Creek
30	Dunn		Frederic G. Barlow	Rep.	Rock Creek
30	Eau Claire		Julius Ingram	Rep.	Eau Claire
18	Fond du Lac	1	Uriah Wood	Rep.	Brandon
18	Fond du Lac	2	Almon Swan	Rep.	Oakfield
18	Fond du Lac	3	James Fitzgerald	Gbk.	Fond du Lac
20	Fond du Lac	4	Michael Wirtz	Dem.	Taycheedah
16	Grant	1	William E. Carter	Rep.	Platteville
16	Grant	2	William J. McCoy	Dem.	Beetown
16	Grant	3	Thomas J. Graham	Dem.	Muscoda
12	Green	1	John Luchsinger	Rep.	New Glarus
12	Green	2	Franklin Mitchell	Rep.	Spring Grove
09	Green Lake		Orrin W. Bow	Dem.	Kingston
28	Iowa	1	Owen King	Gbk.	Helena
28	Iowa	2	John Gray	Rep.	Mineral Point
32	Jackson		Carl C. Pope	Rep.	Black River Falls
23	Jefferson	1	Hezekiah Flinn	Dem.	Watertown
23	Jefferson	2	John D. Bullock	Rep.	Johnson Creek
23	Jefferson	3	Hiram J. Ball	Dem.	Palmyra
14	Juneau	1	James Mullowney	Dem.	Kildare
14	Juneau	2	E. D. Rogers	Dem.	Necedah
08	Kenosha		Walter L. Dexter	Dem.	Pleasant Prairie
01	Kewaunee		Charles Tisch	Dem.	Carlton
31	La Crosse		Suel Briggs	Rep.	Holland
11	Lafayette	1	Lars E. Johnson	Dem.	Wiota
11	Lafayette	2	Bernard McGinty	Dem.	Kendall
15	Manitowoc	1	Thomas Thornton	Dem.	Cato
15	Manitowoc	2	William F. Nash	Dem.	Two Rivers
15	Manitowoc	3	Henry Vits	Dem.	Manitowoc
21	Marathon		F. W. Kickbusch	Gbk.	Wausau
09	Marquette		William H. Peters	Dem.	Montello
05	Milwaukee	1	Edward C. Wall	Dem.	Milwaukee
07	Milwaukee	2	John C. Dick	Ref.	Milwaukee
07	Milwaukee	3	Edward Keogh	Dem.	Milwaukee
07	Milwaukee	4	Edwin Hyde	Rep.	Milwaukee
06	Milwaukee	5	John Bentley	Dem.	Milwaukee
05	Milwaukee	6	Henry Smith	Soc.	Milwaukee
07	Milwaukee	7	Charles H. Hamilton	Rep.	Milwaukee
06	Milwaukee	8	Charles T. Burnham	Gbk.	Milwaukee
05	Milwaukee	9	Charles Holzhauer	Dem.	Milwaukee
05	Milwaukee	10	Frederick Moskowitt	Lib.D.	Good Hope
06	Milwaukee	11	William Lawler	Dem.	New Coeln
32	Monroe	1	James D. Condit	Dem.	Sparta
32	Monroe	2	William Y. Baker	Rep.	Oakdale
01	Oconto & Shawano		Ernst Funke	Rep.	Oconto
22	Outagamie	1	William S. Warner	Ind.D.	Appleton
22	Outagamie	2	Francis Steffen	Ref.	Hortonville
33	Ozaukee		William H. Fitzgerald	Dem.	Cedarburg
30	Pierce		Charles A. Hawn	Rep.	Rock Elm
21	Portage		James Meehan	Gbk.	Linwood
03	Racine	1	Charles Jonas	Dem.	Racine
03	Racine	2	Patrick Cheves	Lib.	Norway
28	Richland	1	Joseph M. Thomas	Rep.	Lone Rock
28	Richland	2	Philip M. Smith	Rep.	Fancy Creek
17	Rock	1	Charles H. Parker	Gbk.	Beloit
17	Rock	2	Fenner Kimball	Rep.	Janesville
17	Rock	3	William H. Stark	Rep.	La Prairie
14	Sauk	1	David B. Hulburt	Rep.	Loganville
14	Sauk	2	Alexander P. Ellinwood	Rep.	Reedsburg
20	Sheboygan	1	Gustavis A. Willard	Dem.	Sheboygan
20	Sheboygan	2	J. L. Shepard	Rep.	Sheboygan Falls
20	Sheboygan	3	James White	Dem.	Sherman
24	St. Croix		James Hill	Rep.	Warren
29	Trempealeau		James M. Barrett	Rep.	Trempealeau
04	Vernon	1	Christian Ellefson	Gbk.	Coon Prairie
04	Vernon	2	Allen Rusk	Rep.	Liberty
08	Walworth	1	Alma M. Aldrich	Rep.	Spring Prairie
08	Walworth	2	John Pemberton	Rep.	Richmond
08	Walworth	3	Edwin D. Coe	Rep.	Whitewater
33	Washington	1	William Scollard	Dem.	Erin
33	Washington	2	Cornelius Coughlin	Gbk.	West Bend
10	Waukesha	1	Alvarus E. Gilbert	Rep.	New Berlin
10	Waukesha	2	Richard Weaver	Dem.	Lisbon
21	Waupaca	1	Lorenzo L. Post	Dem.	Weyauwega
21	Waupaca	2	Francis M. Guernsey	Rep.	Clintonville
09	Waushara		Samuel R. Clark	Ind.R.	Bloomfield
19	Winnebago	1	James V. Jones	Rep.	Oshkosh
19	Winnebago	2	John Potter Jr.	Gbk.	Menasha
19	Winnebago	3	Levi E. Knapp	Rep.	Oshkosh
19	Winnebago	4	Milan Ford	Gbk.	Nekimi

== Employees ==
=== Senate employees ===
- Chief Clerk: Andrew Jackson Turner until February 7, 1878, then Charles E. Bross
  - Assistant Clerk: F. J. Stockwell
  - Bookkeeper: I. F. Stickle
  - Engrossing Clerk: J. W. Bates
  - Enrolling Clerk: John W. DeGroff
- Sergeant-at-Arms: L. J. Brayton
  - Assistant Sergeant-at-Arms: D. D. Polleys
- Postmaster: Fred Badger
  - Assistant Postmaster: J. A. Neavill
- Gallery Attendant: George M. Laing
  - Assistant Attendant: John Beck
  - Committee Room Attendants:
    - William Reese
    - W. A. Mills
    - D. H. Pulcifer
- Doorkeepers:
  - R. B. Winsor
  - W. F. Bingman
  - G. W. McDougal
  - L. L. Gunderson
- Porter: John Benson
- Night Watch: C. L. Smith
- Messengers:
  - Charles Marsden
  - Welcome Smith
  - George Buehner
  - E. Hubbell
  - Harry Meeker
  - Louis Loper
  - Prentiss S. Brannan
  - Eddie Torrey
  - P. L. Jerdee
  - Lucien Pickarts
  - Thomas Lucas

=== Assembly employees ===
- Chief Clerk: Jabez R. Hunter
  - Assistant Clerk: Sam Ryan Jr.
  - Bookkeeper: Roger C. Spooner
  - Engrossing Clerk: Michael Bohan
    - Asst. Engrossing Clerk: George Cox
  - Enrolling Clerk: H. G. Fischbein
    - Asst. Enrolling Clerk: John Meehan
  - Proof Reader: Michael Walsh
- Sergeant-at-Arms: Anton Klaus
  - Assistant Sergeant-at-Arms: M. J. Egan
  - Assistant Sergeant-at-Arms: Hugh Lewis
- Postmaster: D. W. C. Wilson
  - Assistant Postmaster: George W. Dart
  - Assistant Postmaster: Anthony G. Froner
- Doorkeepers:
  - J. A. Allen
  - Thomas Hobbins
  - O. H. Hestehurn
  - N. Sullivan
- Committee Room Attendants:
  - Ed. Flaherty
  - Anton Klaus Jr.
  - Richard Donevan
  - William Mahoney
  - S. S. Hills
  - Ed. Jannush
- Gallery Attendants:
  - John Kane
  - A. Tideman
- Porters:
  - B. Coyne
  - Henry Ebert
- Night Watch: F. B. Brundage
- Night Watch: Francis Fitzgerald
- Fireman: George Burns
- Janitor: Peter Labonde
- Wash Room Attendant: James Whitty
- Messengers:
  - Clinton Snow
  - Charles Whitton
  - Harry Cutler
  - Willie Krueger
  - Fred T. Lee
  - Jas. Foran
  - Herman Schum
  - George Gewecke
  - Robert Gilroy
  - Marcus L. Moody
  - William Burnett
  - John Roberts
  - Edward Cavanaugh
  - Charles Klaus
