= KOCQ =

KOCQ may refer to:

- KOCQ-LP, a low-power radio station (102.5 FM) licensed to serve Denton, Texas, United States
- Oconto - J. Douglas Bake Municipal Airport (ICAO code KOCQ)
