= Lingelbach =

Lingelbach is a surname. Notable people with the surname include:

- Frank J. Lingelbach (1888–1947), American businessman and politician
- Johannes Lingelbach (1622–1674), Dutch Golden Age painter
