= California Unfair Competition Law =

California state law

In addition to United States federal laws, each state has its own unfair competition law to prohibit false and misleading advertising. In California, one such statute is the Unfair Competition Law ("UCL"), Business and Professions Code §§ 17200 et seq. The UCL "borrows heavily from section 5 of the Federal Trade Commission Act", but has developed its own body of case law.

== History of the UCL ==
California Civil Code § 3369, enacted in 1872, was California's early unfair competition statute, although this only addressed "the availability of civil remedies for business violations in cases of penalty, forfeiture, and criminal violation". A 1933 amendment expanded the law to prohibit "any person [from] performing an act of unfair competition". This amendment did not, however, extend UCL protection to consumers. This limitation was in response to the U.S. Supreme Court's 1931 decision in FTC v. Raladam (1931). In Raladam, the Court held that a FTC Act Section 5 violation must show actual injury to competition. This ruling prevented individual consumers from suing under the FTC Act. Following this rationale, California applied the UCL to unfair business practices that affected business competitors, not consumers.

In 1935, consumers, not just business competitors, were given the opportunity to sue under the UCL. The Supreme Court of California clarified the statute in American Philatelic Soc. v. Claibourne, stating that "the rules of unfair competition" should protect the public from "fraud and deceit". In 1962, a California appellate court reiterated this rule by stating that the UCL extended "equitable relief to situations beyond the scope of purely business competition." In 1977, the legislature moved the UCL to the California Business and Professions Code § 17200. In 2004, California voters enacted Proposition 64, which limited UCL standing to individuals who suffered financial/property loss because of an unfair business practice.

== Section 17200 standing to sue ==
The UCL confers standing on both private parties and public prosecutors. Section 17204 authorizes the Attorney General, district attorneys, county counsels and city attorneys to file lawsuits on behalf of injured citizens. Prior to Proposition 64, any consumer, regardless of whether they were adversely affected by unfair business acts, could bring a UCL action. In addition, any consumer could act as a representative and file a class action lawsuit against a business committing unfair competition. Proposition 64 allows only private plaintiffs who have "suffered injury in fact and lost money or property as a result of such unfair competition" may file suit, while "unaffected" plaintiffs now lack standing. Furthermore, the California Supreme Court expanded this amendment to class actions in Arias v. Superior Court by holding that "unaffected" plaintiffs no longer may bring a class action lawsuit unless they satisfy the regular requirements laid out in Cal. Civ. Code § 382. The requirement does not apply to all class members, however; only class representatives must meet these requirements.

== Overview of the UCL ==
California's UCL is broadly written. Section 17200 includes five definitions of unfair competition: (1) an unlawful business act or practice; (2) an unfair business act or practice; (3) a fraudulent business act or practice; (4) unfair, deceptive, untrue, or misleading advertising; or (5) any act prohibited by Sections 17500–17577.5. Section 17203 allows the court to order injunctions and other equitable defenses to prevent the unfair competition.

== Elements of a false advertising claim ==
Most false advertising litigation involves definitions four and five listed above because they both specifically prohibit false advertising. To prove a violation under the fourth definition of unfair competition, the plaintiff must show that (1) the defendant engaged in unfair, deceptive, untrue or misleading advertising and (2) the plaintiff suffered injury in fact and lost money or property. California courts have interpreted "advertising" to include almost any statement made in connection with the sale of goods or services. For example, Chern v. Bank of America held that a loan officer's statement over the phone about interest rates was "advertising". Conversely, Bank of the West v. Superior Court implied that advertising might require "widespread promotional activities directed to the public-at-large" and that mere "personal solicitations are not advertising."

To determine whether advertising is misleading, California's courts evaluate the advertisement's entire impression, including words, images, format and product packaging. Courts have held that advertising is misleading if "members of the public are likely to be deceived." However, because of Proposition 64, the plaintiff now has to show that they were actually misled by the advertising and suffered an injury as a result. To further complicate matters, the courts are split on whether "omissions of material facts" that mislead or confuse the public violate the UCL. To prove a violation under the fifth definition, the plaintiff must show that section 17500 was violated. This "sweep up" provision ensures that any acts mentioned in section 17500 also violate section 17200 and that the plaintiff receives remedies under both statutes.

In many cases, liquidators which are hired to sell merchandise from a closing store will actually raise the prices on items that were already marked-down on clearance. For items already marked-down to 50% off, this means the liquidator is doubling the price (quadrupling it for a 75%-off price), and then "discounting" it from there. Also common is for the sale prices at a retail chain's other stores to be lower than the liquidator's prices at the closing stores. Both of these were proven to be the case in November 2008, with the same liquidator (Hilco) committing both offenses: the markups at Linens 'n Things, and the higher prices on around one-third of the items compared to other Circuit City stores remaining open. Additionally, liquidators refuse to accept returns, so if a customer does find he or she has been overcharged, there is no apparent recourse. This is used by most advertisers trying to prove the acceptability of their products.

== Relationship between section 17200 and other California statutes ==
Most plaintiffs allege violations of section 17200 and 17500 concurrently, and courts often do not distinguish between these definitions of unfair competition, despite important differences between these two sections. A violation of section 17200 may not always trigger a violation of 17500. Section 17500 prohibits any untrue or misleading statements made in connection with the sale of goods or services, which is narrower standard than section 17200. For example, section 17500 only concerns advertising of property or services while section 17200 has no such limitation. Section 17500 only prohibits advertising, but section 17200 also forbids "fraudulent business acts or practices" unconnected with advertising. Another major distinction is that section 17500 requires that the advertiser knew or should have known that the advertising was false or misleading. Section 17200 is a strict liability statute that has no such requirement. In addition, section 17500 carries criminal penalties, whereas only civil remedies are available for section 17200 violations.

Plaintiffs suing under Sections 17200 or 17500 often also assert violations of the California Consumers Legal Remedies Act (CLRA), set forth in Cal. Civ. Code § 1750 et seq. The CLRA protects consumers against 23 specific activities that it defines as unfair and deceptive business practices. Many of those activities are also prohibited by section 17500 and Cal. Civ. Code §1770. For example, it is unlawful under both statutes to advertise goods with the intent not to sell them as advertised or to misrepresent a product's price or source. Plaintiffs typically simultaneously plead violations of each statute because the remedies are cumulative. For example, the CLRA provides for attorney's fees, punitive damages, and statutory damages.

It has been suggested that non-compliance with the disclosure requirements of the California Transparency in Supply Chains Act of 2010 may constitute an unlawful or unfair business practice, which would open up the possibility of civil actions being taken against non-compliant retailers and manufacturers with a presence in the state.

== Exemptions and defenses ==
The UCL requires that lawsuits be brought within four years after the cause of action accrued. The UCL postpones accrual of the cause of action until the plaintiff "discovers" the problem. Section 17500 does not have an express statute of limitations. Thus, California Code of Civil Procedure section 338(h), which specifies a three-year limitation, ordinarily should apply to section 17500. However, as section 17500 is cross referenced in section 17200, and as virtually all false advertising claims are litigated simultaneously with UCL claims, the limitations period for "false advertising claims is effectively four-years."

Judges can use their equitable powers to dismiss a UCL claim or deny injunctive relief. For example, in competitor-vs.-competitor lawsuits, the defendant may assert unclean hands if it believes the plaintiff has engaged in serious misconduct that relates to the subject of relief being sought. In other words, a "plaintiff must not behave inequitably with respect to the rights being asserted in the case." Because the UCL is a strict liability statute, other equitable defenses such as "good faith, mistake of law and lack of wrongful intent are generally inapplicable [to] a UCL action."

== Remedies available under the UCL ==
The UCL allows the court to prevent the use of unfair competition and to restore money or property to victims of unfair competition. Essentially, this provision allows for restitution and injunctive relief where necessary. When an injunction is issued pursuant to section 17200, penalties of up to $6,000 per day for intentional violations are authorized. Restitution and disgorgement of profits are used primarily to deter future violations. Courts use various factors to determine the amount of the penalty, including "the nature and seriousness of the misconduct, the number of violations, the persistence of the misconduct, the length of time over which the misconduct occurred, the willfulness of the defendant's misconduct, and the defendant's assets, liabilities, and net worth. Civil penalties, up to $2,500 for each violation, are allowed when a lawsuit is brought by an authorized government agency. However, the UCL does not permit punitive damages awards.
