= Charles Burnham =

Charles Burnham may refer to:

- Charles Burnham (politician) (1847–1908), American manufacturer and politician in the Wisconsin State Assembly
- Charles Burnham (geneticist) (died 1995), American plant geneticist
- Charles Burnham (musician) (born 1950), American violinist and composer
