= West Bloomfield =

West Bloomfield can refer to several places in the United States:

- West Bloomfield Township, Michigan
- West Bloomfield, New York
- West Bloomfield, Wisconsin
