= Oconto, Wisconsin =

- City
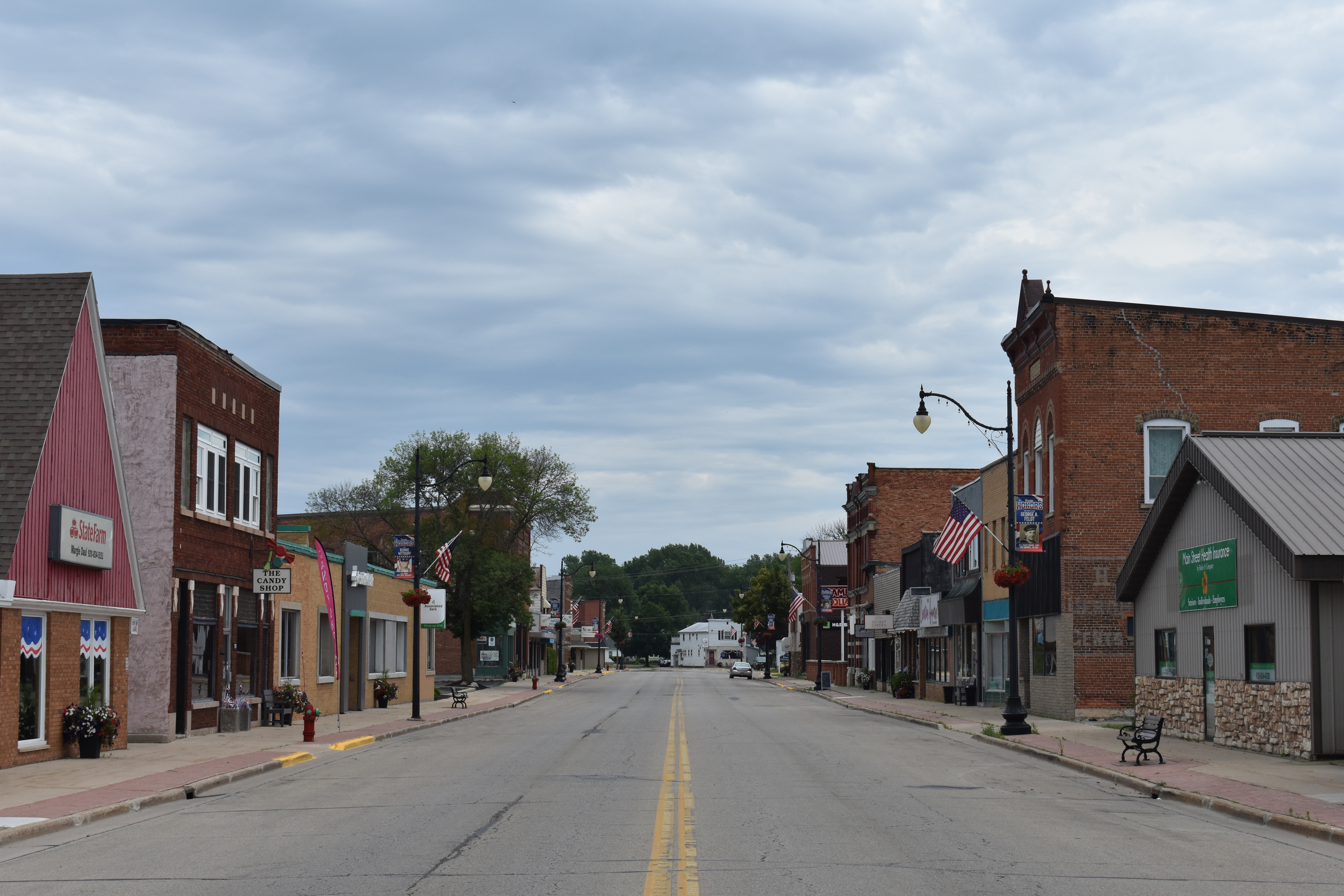
- Downtown Oconto
- Interactive map of Oconto, Wisconsin
- Location within Wisconsin Location within the United States
- Coordinates: 44°53′N 87°52′W
- Country: United States
- State: Wisconsin
- County: Oconto

Government
  - Mayor: Justin LeMire

Area
  - Total: 7.14 sq mi (18.48 km^{2})
  - Land: 6.78 sq mi (17.57 km^{2})
  - Water: 0.35 sq mi (0.91 km^{2})

Population (2020)
  - Total: 4,609
  - Density: 679/sq mi (262.3/km^{2})
- Time zone: UTC-6 (Central (CST))
  - Summer (DST): UTC-5 (CDT)
- ZIP codes: 54153
- Area code: 920
- FIPS code: 55-59350
- Website: cityofoconto.com

Oconto is a city and county seat of Oconto County, Wisconsin, United States. The population was 4,609 at the 2020 census. It is part of the Green Bay metropolitan area. The city is located partially within the town of Oconto.

== History ==
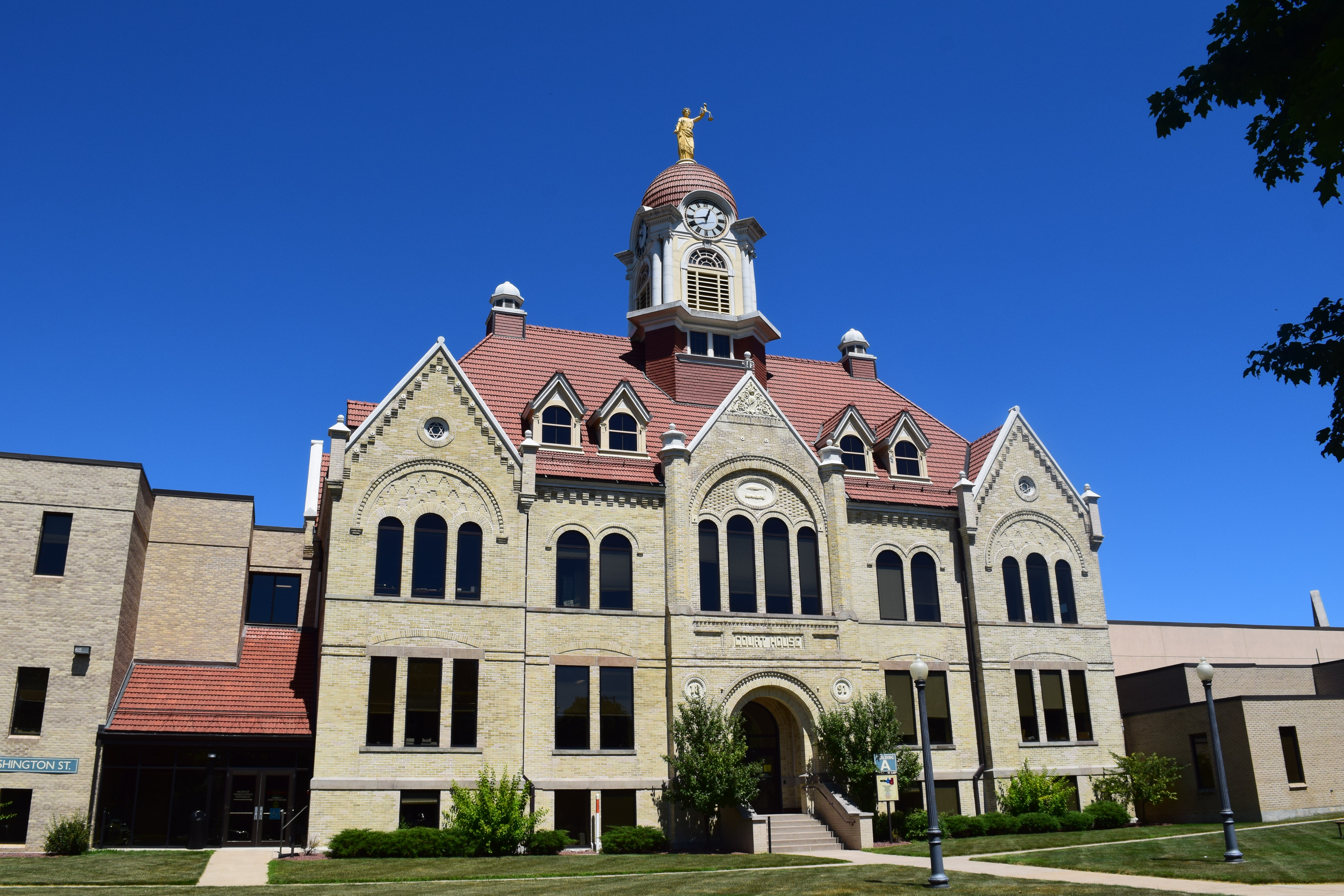
Oconto County Courthouse

Oconto is home to Copper Culture State Park, which has remains dated to around 5000 to 6000 BC. It is a burial ground of the Copper Culture Indians. This burial ground is considered to be the oldest cemetery in Wisconsin and one of the oldest in the nation. Their descendants include the Menominee, who have lived here for thousands of years.

The first Europeans to come to the area were the French, who considered it to be part of New France. The French Jesuit, Roman Catholic priest, and missionary, Father Claude-Jean Allouez said the first Mass in Oconto on December 3, 1669. The Menominee living here began participating in the fur trade network and converting to Christianity. This area was included in the land ceded by the Menominee to the United States government in the 1836 Treaty of the Cedars. In this treaty, the Menominee ceded over four million acres of land after years of negotiations about how to accommodate the Oneida, Stockbridge-Munsee, and Brothertown peoples who were being removed from New York to Wisconsin.

Following the treaty, the land became officially available for American settlement, although soldiers and lumberers had already been here for some time. The same year the Treaty of the Cedars was signed, George Lurwick bought a home and sawmill along the Oconto River, becoming the town's first private land owner now that the land had been sold to the United States.

The city of Oconto was incorporated in 1869. The city took its name from the nearby Oconto River. The name Okāqtow is a Menominee name meaning "the place of the pike", one of several pike-related place-names in the area.

The first Christian Science church in the world was erected in 1886 in Oconto and still stands at the corner of Main Street and Chicago Street. The land was donated by Henry (1837–1904) and Victoria Sargent (1848–1930).

In 1891, the city hosted minor league baseball when the Oconto Log Drivers became charter members of the Wisconsin State League. The league began play on May 14, 1891 and the Log Drivers did not return after the first league season.

In the summer of 1952, during a two-day period, an estimated 175,000,000 leopard frogs emerged from nearby marshes and enveloped the town. The water level of Lake Michigan rose in the spring, flooding the wetlands. The frogs laid their eggs, and when the lake level receded with the heat of summer, most of the eggs would die. However, in 1952, Lake Michigan remained high, and a huge number of frog eggs grew into live amphibians.

== Geography ==
Oconto is located at 44°53′N 87°52′W (44.8877, -87.8704). According to the United States Census Bureau, the city has a total area of 7.14 square miles (18.49 km^{2}), of which 6.79 square miles (17.59 km^{2}) is land and 0.35 square miles (0.91 km^{2}) is water. Oconto is located at the mouth of the Oconto River, which empties into Lake Michigan.

=== Rail trail ===
The St. Paul Eastern Grand Trunk Railway was chartered on September 5, 1879, which later was acquired by the Chicago and North Western Railway. It was subsequently purchased, then some years later abandoned by Union Pacific RR. It then became the Oconto River State Trail.

=== Climate ===
Climate data for Oconto, Wisconsin (1991–2020 normals, extremes 1893–present)
Month	Jan	Feb	Mar	Apr	May	Jun	Jul	Aug	Sep	Oct	Nov	Dec	Year
Record high °F (°C)	58 (14)	63 (17)	83 (28)	90 (32)	98 (37)	102 (39)	105 (41)	102 (39)	98 (37)	89 (32)	75 (24)	63 (17)	105 (41)
Mean daily maximum °F (°C)	26.0 (−3.3)	29.5 (−1.4)	40.4 (4.7)	53.1 (11.7)	66.2 (19.0)	76.0 (24.4)	80.5 (26.9)	79.0 (26.1)	71.7 (22.1)	58.3 (14.6)	43.9 (6.6)	31.3 (−0.4)	54.7 (12.6)
Daily mean °F (°C)	17.5 (−8.1)	19.9 (−6.7)	30.5 (−0.8)	42.7 (5.9)	55.2 (12.9)	65.3 (18.5)	69.5 (20.8)	67.9 (19.9)	60.1 (15.6)	47.9 (8.8)	35.5 (1.9)	23.6 (−4.7)	44.6 (7.0)
Mean daily minimum °F (°C)	8.9 (−12.8)	10.3 (−12.1)	20.6 (−6.3)	32.3 (0.2)	44.2 (6.8)	54.6 (12.6)	58.5 (14.7)	56.9 (13.8)	48.6 (9.2)	37.5 (3.1)	27.1 (−2.7)	15.8 (−9.0)	34.6 (1.4)
Record low °F (°C)	−35 (−37)	−35 (−37)	−27 (−33)	5 (−15)	19 (−7)	31 (−1)	37 (3)	30 (−1)	22 (−6)	10 (−12)	−8 (−22)	−22 (−30)	−35 (−37)
Average precipitation inches (mm)	1.53 (39)	1.34 (34)	2.13 (54)	3.10 (79)	3.51 (89)	4.00 (102)	4.10 (104)	3.33 (85)	3.48 (88)	3.19 (81)	2.15 (55)	1.95 (50)	33.81 (859)
Average snowfall inches (cm)	10.5 (27)	11.1 (28)	7.9 (20)	4.9 (12)	0.1 (0.25)	0.0 (0.0)	0.0 (0.0)	0.0 (0.0)	0.0 (0.0)	0.2 (0.51)	2.3 (5.8)	14.5 (37)	51.5 (131)
Average precipitation days (≥ 0.01 in)	7.8	5.6	6.9	9.6	10.2	10.2	10.5	8.6	8.5	8.6	7.0	7.8	101.3
Average snowy days (≥ 0.1 in)	6.7	5.2	3.3	1.9	0.1	0.0	0.0	0.0	0.0	0.2	1.7	5.8	24.9
Source: NOAA

== Demographics ==
Historical population
Census	Pop.	Note	%±
1860	885		—
1870	2,655		200.0%
1880	4,171		57.1%
1890	5,219		25.1%
1900	4,646		−11.0%
1910	5,629		21.2%
1920	4,920		−12.6%
1930	5,030		2.2%
1940	5,362		6.6%
1950	5,055		−5.7%
1960	4,805		−4.9%
1970	4,667		−2.9%
1980	4,505		−3.5%
1990	4,474		−0.7%
2000	4,708		5.2%
2010	4,513		−4.1%
2020	4,609		2.1%
U.S. Decennial Census

The table with historical census data indicates that the population has remained relatively flat throughout the 20th century.

=== 2020 census ===
As of the census of 2020, the population was 4,609. The population density was 679.3 inhabitants per square mile (262.3/km^{2}). There were 2,175 housing units at an average density of 320.6 per square mile (123.8/km^{2}). The racial makeup of the city was 91.8% White, 2.1% Native American, 0.5% Black or African American, 0.4% Asian, 0.7% from other races, and 4.5% from two or more races. Ethnically, the population was 3.1% Hispanic or Latino of any race.

=== 2010 census ===
As of the census of 2010, there were 4,513 people, 1,872 households, and 1,172 families residing in the city. The population density was 657.9 inhabitants per square mile (254.0/km^{2}). There were 2,094 housing units at an average density of 305.2 per square mile (117.8/km^{2}). The racial makeup of the city was 96.4% White, 0.7% African American, 1.1% Native American, 0.4% Asian, 0.4% from other races, and 1.2% from two or more races. Hispanic or Latino people of any race were 2.4% of the population.

There were 1,872 households, of which 30.0% had children under the age of 18 living with them, 45.1% were married couples living together, 11.4% had a female householder with no husband present, 6.1% had a male householder with no wife present, and 37.4% were non-families. 32.2% of all households were made up of individuals, and 15.1% had someone living alone who was 65 years of age or older. The average household size was 2.35 and the average family size was 2.95.

The median age in the city was 39.6 years. 23.4% of residents were under the age of 18; 8.9% were between the ages of 18 and 24; 24.5% were from 25 to 44; 27.3% were from 45 to 64; and 15.8% were 65 years of age or older. The gender makeup of the city was 49.7% male and 50.3% female.

=== 2000 census ===
As of the census of 2000, there were 4,708 people, 1,870 households, and 1,221 families residing in the city. The population density was 683.7 people per square mile (263.8/km^{2}). There were 2,040 housing units at an average density of 296.2 per square mile (114.3/km^{2}). The racial makeup of the city was 97.79% White, 0.02% Black or African American, 0.85% Native American, 0.17% Asian, 0.06% Pacific Islander, 0.21% from other races, and 0.89% from two or more races. 0.79% of the population were Hispanic or Latino of any race.

There were 1,870 households, out of which 33.2% had children under the age of 18 living with them, 49.1% were married couples living together, 11.5% had a female householder with no husband present, and 34.7% were non-families. 29.3% of all households were made up of individuals, and 15.0% had someone living alone who was 65 years of age or older. The average household size was 2.44 and the average family size was 2.99.

In the city, the population was spread out, with 25.8% under the age of 18, 8.8% from 18 to 24, 27.8% from 25 to 44, 21.0% from 45 to 64, and 16.7% who were 65 years of age or older. The median age was 37 years. For every 100 females, there were 92.2 males. For every 100 females age 18 and over, there were 89.0 males.

The median income for a household in the city was $34,589, and the median income for a family was $43,676. Males had a median income of $27,455 versus $22,083 for females. The per capita income for the city was $20,717. About 5.2% of families and 8.8% of the population were below the poverty line, including 9.6% of those under age 18 and 10.5% of those age 65 or over.

== Education ==
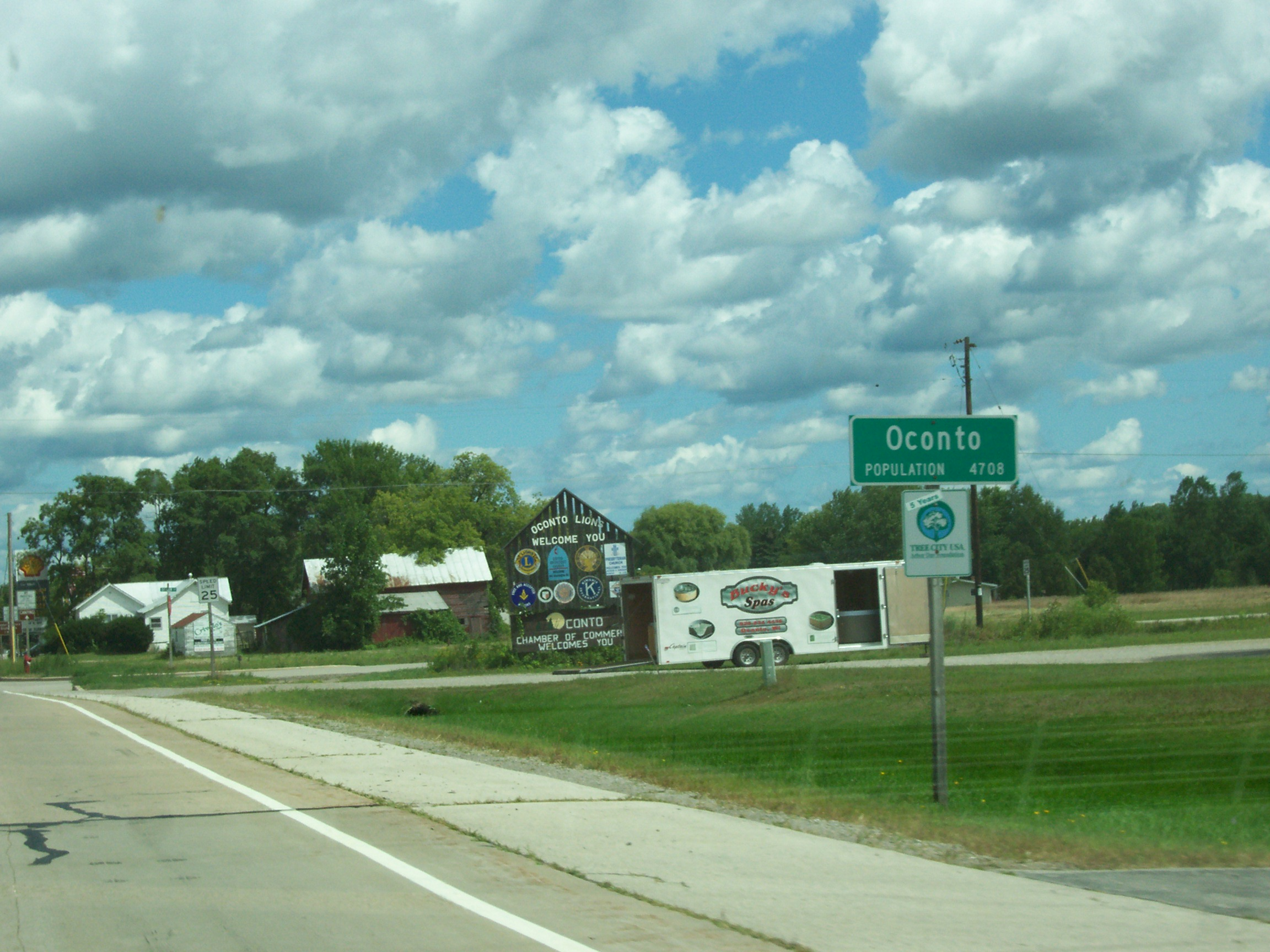
Welcome signs on U.S. Route 41

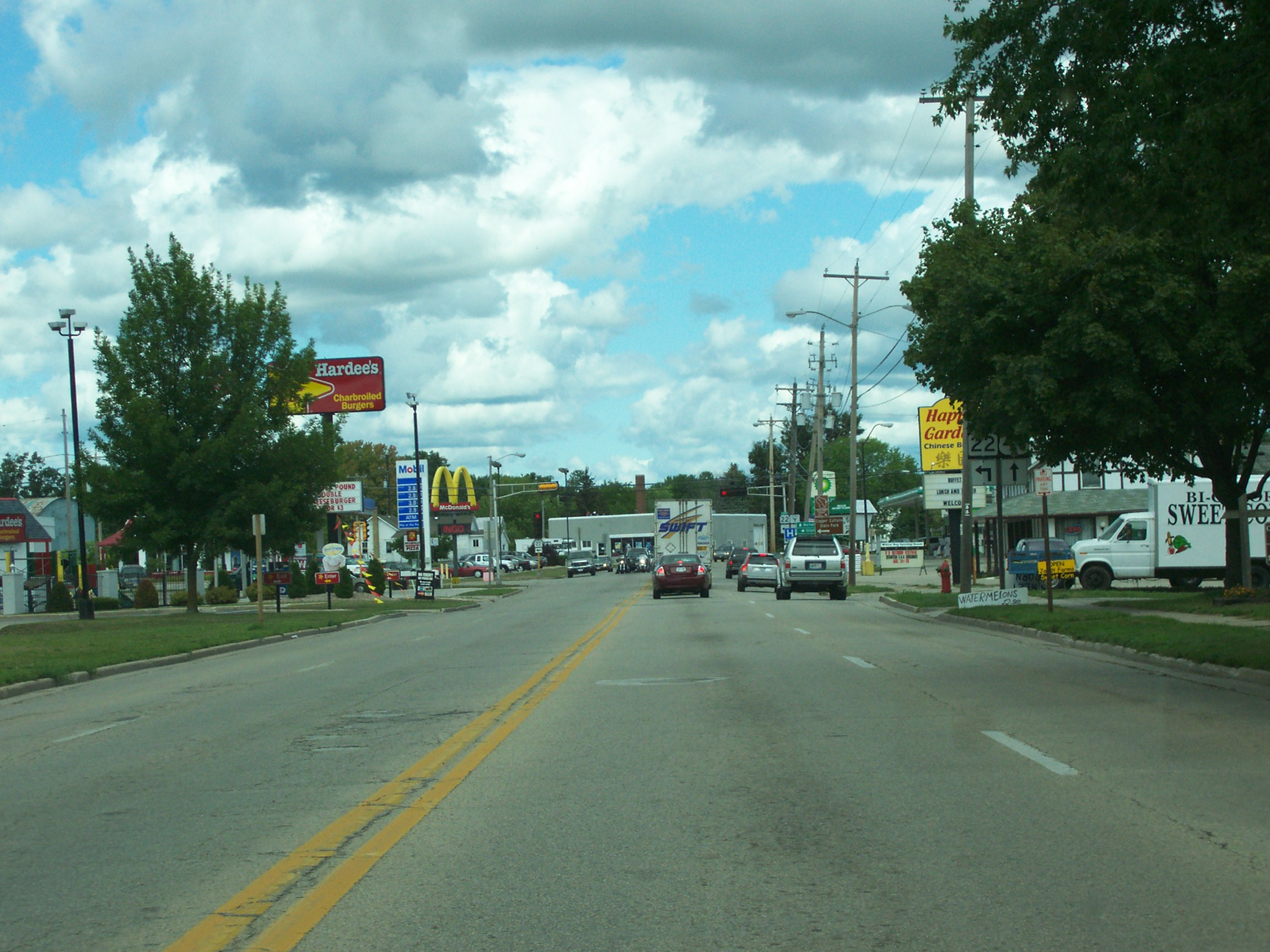
Looking north at the eastern terminus of Wisconsin Highway 22 at U.S. Route 41 in Oconto

The following schools are located in Oconto:

- Oconto Elementary School
- Oconto Literacy Charter School
- Oconto Middle School
- Oconto High School

== Transportation ==
=== Major highways ===
- US 41 Northbound travels to Marinette. South it continues toward Green Bay.
- WIS 22 connects with Oconto Falls and Gillett southbound.

=== Airport ===
J. Douglas Bake Memorial Airport (KOCQ) serves the city and surrounding communities.

== Notable businesses ==
- Cruisers yachts, a builder of luxury pleasure yachts

== Notable people ==
- George E. Ansorge, Wisconsin State Representative
- Lewis S. Bailey, Wisconsin State Representative
- Alexander Brazeau, Wisconsin State Representative
- John B. Chase, Wisconsin State Senator
- David Guy Classon, U.S. Representative
- Pahl Davis, NFL player
- Thomas A. Delaney, Wisconsin State Representative
- Jake Dickert, head football coach, Washington State University
- Tony Dollinger, NFL player
- Hermina Franks, AAGPBL ballplayer
- Ernst Funke, Wisconsin State Representative
- George Clay Ginty, Union Army general
- Charles Hall, Wisconsin State Representative
- Fay Holderness, actress
- Richard W. Hubbell, Wisconsin State Representative
- Reuben La Fave, Wisconsin State Senator
- Marty Larsen, Wisconsin State Representative
- Frank J. Lingelbach, Wisconsin State Representative
- Red Mack, NFL player
- Bob McDougal, NFL player
- Jab Murray, NFL player
- Alvin O'Konski, U.S. Representative
- Louis P. Pahl, Wisconsin State Representative
- Edward Scofield, Governor of Wisconsin
- Landy Scott, champion race car driver
- Warren R. Smith, Wisconsin State Treasurer
- William T. Sullivan, Wisconsin State Representative
- Deral Teteak, football player
- Blaine Walsh, sports announcer
- Arthur J. Whitcomb, Wisconsin State Representative and lawyer
- William Henry Young, Wisconsin State Representative
- John E. Youngs, Wisconsin State Representative
