= Oconto County Courthouse =

- U.S. National Register of Historic Places
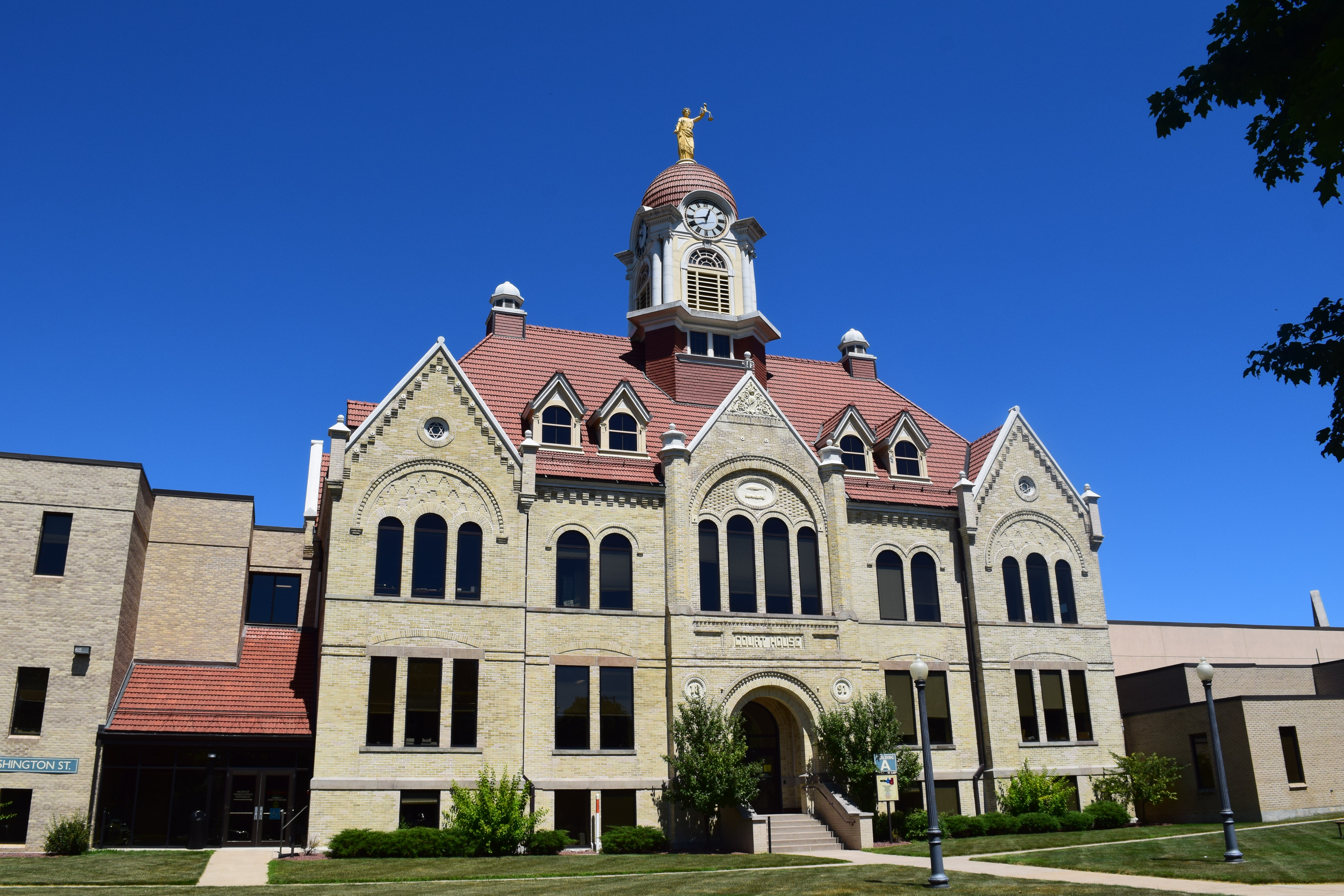
- Oconto County Courthouse in July 2017

- Location within Wisconsin
- Interactive map showing the location for Oconto County Courthouse
- Location: 300 Washington St., Oconto, Wisconsin
- Coordinates: 44°53′22″N 87°51′58″W
- Area: 2 acres (0.81 ha)
- Built: 1891
- Architect: Rau & Kirsch (1891), Foeller & Schober (1907)
- Architectural style: Romanesque Revival, Neoclassical
- MPS: County Courthouses of Wisconsin TR (PDF)
- NRHP reference No.: 82000690
- Added to NRHP: March 9, 1982

The Oconto County Courthouse is a county courthouse in Oconto, Wisconsin, United States. It houses the circuit court and government offices of Oconto County, Wisconsin. The courthouse was built in 1891, with major alterations in 1907 and 1963. It was listed on the National Register of Historic Places in 1982 and the state register of historic places in 1989 for its local architectural significance.

== History ==
The current building is the second courthouse to serve Oconto County. The first courthouse was a wood frame structure built in 1857 at the intersection of First Street and Collins Avenue. It was destroyed by fire in March 1891.

The second and current courthouse was constructed in 1891. Architects Charles H. Rau and Robert G. Kirsch of Milwaukee designed the building in the Romanesque Revival style. The new courthouse was built on Washington Street, in what had been a vacant field. This had been the site of an extrajudicial lynching in May 1871, when a mob broke German inmate Ludwig Neher (also recorded as Louis Nohr) out of the county jail and hung him from an oak tree in retribution for the shooting death of musician Joseph Ruelle.

A fire in September 1907 destroyed the original roof and upper level of the 1891 courthouse. In the aftermath of the fire, the county hired architects Henry A. Foeller and Max W. Schober of Green Bay to repair and enlarge the structure. In contrast to the original Romanesque architecture, Foeller and Schober redesigned the roof in the Neoclassical style, creating a larger domed cupola.

The interior of the courthouse was extensively remodeled in 1963, and several additions have been constructed around the original building to provide space for additional county offices and jail facilities.

== Design ==
The courthouse is two stories with a large attic and a square domed cupola, and combines elements of the Romanesque Revival and Neoclassical styles. The exterior consists of blond brick walls with a red tile hipped roof. The facade is broken into three gabled pavilions, each of which is decorated with miniature ornamental bartizans and large semicircular arches above the second story windows. The tympanum of the central arch features a medallion with a sculpted log and fish, representing the local importance of the logging and fishing industry at the time of the courthouse's construction.

The cupola atop the roof includes a clock tower with seven-foot diameter Seth Thomas clocks from 1907 on each of its four sides. The dome is topped by a gold-colored lead statue of Lady Justice.
