= George E. Ansorge =

American politician

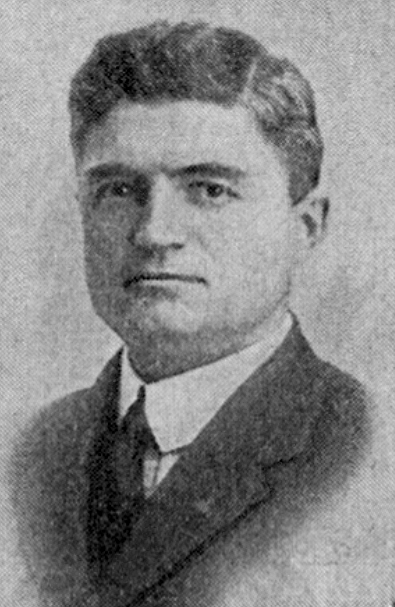

Member of the Wisconsin State Assembly
- In office 1919

Personal details
- Born: August 22, 1880 Oconto, Wisconsin, US
- Died: September 14, 1965 (aged 85) Oconto, Wisconsin, US
- Party: Republican
- Occupation: Hotelier

George E. Ansorge (August 22, 1880 – September 14, 1965) was a member of the Wisconsin State Assembly.

== Biography ==
Ansorge was born on August 22, 1880, in Oconto, Wisconsin. During the Spanish–American War, he served in the United States Army. He died in Oconto on September 14, 1965.

== Political career ==
Ansorge was elected to the assembly in 1918. Previously, he was an Oconto alderman from 1906 to 1912. He was a Republican.
