= Brushville, Wisconsin =

- Unincorporated community
- Location within Wisconsin Location within the United States
- Coordinates: 44°10′12″N 88°59′45″W
- Country: United States
- State: Wisconsin
- County: Waushara
- Elevation: 791 ft (241 m)
- Time zone: UTC-6 (Central (CST))
  - Summer (DST): UTC-5 (CDT)
- Area code: 920
- GNIS feature ID: 1577528

Brushville is an unincorporated community located in the Town of Bloomfield, Waushara County, Wisconsin, United States. The community was founded circa 1853 and was named for mill operators Herman and Eliphalet Brush.
