= Bob McDougal =

American football player (1921–2003)

No. 19
- Position: Fullback

Personal information
- Born: March 19, 1921; Oconto, Wisconsin, U.S.
- Died: August 10, 2003 (aged 82); Oconto, Wisconsin, U.S.
- Listed height: 6 ft 2 in (1.88 m)
- Listed weight: 205 lb (93 kg)

Career information
- High school: Oconto
- College: Wisconsin (1939); Miami (FL) (1941-1942, 1946); Duke (1943)
- NFL draft: 1947: 9th round, 72nd overall pick

Career history
- Green Bay Packers (1947); Pittsburgh Steelers (1948)*; Richmond Rebels (1948)
- * Offseason or practice squad member only

Career NFL statistics
- Games played: 1
- Stats at Pro Football Reference

Robert Joseph McDougal (March 19, 1921 – August 10, 2003) was an American professional football player. A fullback from Oconto, Wisconsin, he played college football for the Wisconsin Badgers in 1939 before playing for the Miami Hurricanes from 1940 to 1942. McDougal played for the Duke Blue Devils in 1943 before serving in World War II, then returned to Miami in 1946. He was selected by the Green Bay Packers of the National Football League (NFL) in the ninth round of the 1947 NFL draft and appeared in one game for them. He later was a member of the Pittsburgh Steelers of the NFL and the Richmond Rebels of the American Football League (AFL).

== Early life ==
McDougal was born on March 19, 1921, in Oconto, Wisconsin. He became a fan of the Green Bay Packers at age five. He attended Oconto High School where he competed in football, basketball and track and field, receiving three letters in each sport. In football, he was the team's starting fullback, while in basketball he started at center. McDougal was a top performer as a junior and senior with the football team and served as co-team captain as a senior. He was unanimously named all-conference in basketball as a senior and the Green Bay Press-Gazette described him as "one of the finest athletes ever to wear the Blue and Gold of Oconto High School". His performance at Oconto drew attention from the University of Wisconsin–Madison to play football.

== College career ==
McDougal played for the freshman football team of the Wisconsin Badgers in 1939. He transferred to the University of Miami in Florida in 1940. He was one of their top players with the freshman team that year and the Press-Gazette described him as being "the outstanding star of every contest". He received a letter with the varsity team in 1941 and "personally led the [Miami] Hurricanes to some startling upsets", including one game where he scored three touchdowns. He remained a "star" player for the Hurricanes in 1942. After this, he was drafted to serve in World War II with the United States Marine Corps. McDougal participated in the V-12 Navy College Training Program at Duke University in North Carolina, also playing for the Duke Blue Devils football team that compiled a record of 8–1 and won the Southern Conference title in the 1943 season. He was later sent overseas in the war as a part of the Sixth Marine Reconnaissance Company, serving in Okinawa, Iwo Jima and New Guinea. Following the war, he returned to Miami and played a final season for the Hurricanes in 1946, helping them compile a record of 8–2. After the season, he received an award as Miami's most outstanding back.

== Professional career ==
McDougal was selected by the Green Bay Packers in the ninth round (72nd overall) of the 1947 NFL draft and signed with them that April. He initially made the team, appearing in one game as a backup fullback before being released in October. He later signed with the Pittsburgh Steelers in June 1948, only to be released in August. After being released by the Steelers, McDougal signed with the Richmond Rebels of the AFL, appearing in 10 games while running for a touchdown and intercepting three passes. He did not return to the team in 1949, ending his professional career.

== Later life and death ==
After his football career, McDougal worked for 40 years as an agent with State Farm insurance. With his wife, Eileen, he had three sons, including Ed, who played as a quarterback in high school. He lived in Miami and died on August 10, 2003, at the age of 82.
