= Thomas A. Delaney =

American lawyer and politician

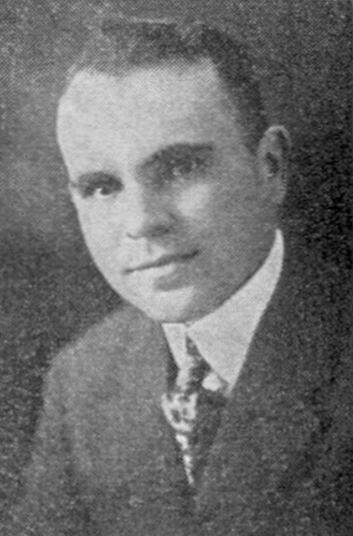
- Born: April 23, 1886; Oconto, Wisconsin, US
- Died: May 17, 1968 (aged 82); Milwaukee, Wisconsin, US
- Education: Marquette University Law School
- Occupations: Lawyer, politician
- Office: Member of the Wisconsin State Assembly
- Term: 1919
- Political party: Democratic

Thomas A. Delaney (April 23, 1886 – May 17, 1968) was an American lawyer and politician.

== Biography ==
Born in Oconto, Wisconsin, Delaney went to the East Side High School in Green Bay, Wisconsin. Delaney received his law degree from Marquette University Law School and practiced law in Green Bay, Wisconsin. Delaney served as police justice for the city of Green Bay and was involved with the Democratic Party. In 1919, Delaney served in the Wisconsin State Assembly in 1919. He died in Milwaukee on May 17, 1968.
