= William Y. Baker =

American politician (1829–?)

William Y. Baker (September 7, 1829 — ?) was an American politician. He was a member of the Wisconsin State Assembly during the 1878 session. Other positions he held include Chairman (similar to Mayor), Postmaster and Clerk of Oakdale, Wisconsin, along with County Commissioner (similar to Supervisor) of Monroe County, Wisconsin. He was a Republican.
