= List of United States Supreme Court cases, volume 96 =

Supreme Court of the United States
- Interactive map of Supreme Court of the United States
- 38°53′26″N 77°00′16″W
- Established: March 4, 1789; 236 years ago
- Location: Washington, D.C.
- Coordinates: 38°53′26″N 77°00′16″W
- Composition method: Presidential nomination with Senate confirmation
- Authorised by: Constitution of the United States, Art. III, § 1
- Judge term length: life tenure, subject to impeachment and removal
- Number of positions: 9 (by statute)
- Website: supremecourt.gov

This is a list of cases reported in volume 96 of United States Reports, decided by the Supreme Court of the United States in 1877 and 1878.

== Justices of the Supreme Court at the time of 96 U.S. ==
The Supreme Court is established by Article III, Section 1 of the Constitution of the United States, which says: "The judicial Power of the United States, shall be vested in one supreme Court . . .". The size of the Court is not specified; the Constitution leaves it to Congress to set the number of justices. Under the Judiciary Act of 1789 Congress originally fixed the number of justices at six (one chief justice and five associate justices). Since 1789 Congress has varied the size of the Court from six to seven, nine, ten, and back to nine justices (always including one chief justice).

When the cases in 96 U.S. were decided the Court comprised the following nine members:

Portrait	Justice	Office	Home State	Succeeded	Date confirmed by the Senate (Vote)	Tenure on Supreme Court
	Morrison Waite	Chief Justice	Ohio	Salmon P. Chase	January 21, 1874 (63–0)	March 4, 1874 – March 23, 1888 (Died)
	Nathan Clifford	Associate Justice	Maine	Benjamin Robbins Curtis	January 12, 1858 (26–23)	January 21, 1858 – July 25, 1881 (Died)
	Noah Haynes Swayne	Associate Justice	Ohio	John McLean	January 24, 1862 (38–1)	January 27, 1862 – January 24, 1881 (Retired)
	Samuel Freeman Miller	Associate Justice	Iowa	Peter Vivian Daniel	July 16, 1862 (Acclamation)	July 21, 1862 – October 13, 1890 (Died)
	Stephen Johnson Field	Associate Justice	California	newly created seat	March 10, 1863 (Acclamation)	May 10, 1863 – December 1, 1897 (Retired)
	William Strong	Associate Justice	Pennsylvania	Robert Cooper Grier	February 18, 1870 (No vote recorded)	March 14, 1870 – December 14, 1880 (Retired)
	Joseph P. Bradley	Associate Justice	New Jersey	newly created seat	March 21, 1870 (46–9)	March 23, 1870 – January 22, 1892 (Died)
	Ward Hunt	Associate Justice	New York	Samuel Nelson	December 11, 1872 (Acclamation)	January 9, 1873 – January 27, 1882 (Retired)
	John Marshall Harlan	Associate Justice	Kentucky	David Davis	November 29, 1877 (Acclamation)	December 10, 1877 – October 14, 1911 (Died)

== Citation style ==
Under the Judiciary Act of 1789 the federal court structure at the time comprised District Courts, which had general trial jurisdiction; Circuit Courts, which had mixed trial and appellate (from the US District Courts) jurisdiction; and the United States Supreme Court, which had appellate jurisdiction over the federal District and Circuit courts—and for certain issues over state courts. The Supreme Court also had limited original jurisdiction (i.e., in which cases could be filed directly with the Supreme Court without first having been heard by a lower federal or state court). There were one or more federal District Courts and/or Circuit Courts in each state, territory, or other geographical region.

Bluebook citation style is used for case names, citations, and jurisdictions.

- "C.C.D." = United States Circuit Court for the District of . . .
  - e.g.,"C.C.D.N.J." = United States Circuit Court for the District of New Jersey
- "D." = United States District Court for the District of . . .
  - e.g.,"D. Mass." = United States District Court for the District of Massachusetts
- "E." = Eastern; "M." = Middle; "N." = Northern; "S." = Southern; "W." = Western
  - e.g.,"C.C.S.D.N.Y." = United States Circuit Court for the Southern District of New York
  - e.g.,"M.D. Ala." = United States District Court for the Middle District of Alabama
- "Ct. Cl." = United States Court of Claims
- The abbreviation of a state's name alone indicates the highest appellate court in that state's judiciary at the time.
  - e.g.,"Pa." = Supreme Court of Pennsylvania
  - e.g.,"Me." = Supreme Judicial Court of Maine

== List of cases in 96 U.S. ==
Case Name	Page and year	Opinion of the Court	Concurring opinion(s)	Dissenting opinion(s)	Lower Court	Disposition
Pensacola Telegraph Company v. Western Union Telegraph Company	1 (1878)	Waite	none	Field; Hunt	C.C.N.D. Fla.	affirmed
Jones v. United States	24 (1878)	Clifford	none	none	Ct. Cl.	affirmed
United States v. State National Bank	30 (1878)	Swayne	none	none	Ct. Cl.	affirmed
United States v. Clark	37 (1878)	Miller	none	Harlan	Ct. Cl.	reversed
Cromwell v. Sac County	51 (1878)	Field	none	none	C.C.D. Iowa	reversed
St. Clair County Turnpike Company v. Illinois	63 (1878)	Bradley	none	none	Ill.	affirmed
Tennessee v. Sneed	69 (1877)	Hunt	none	none	Tenn.	affirmed
Meister v. Moore	76 (1878)	Strong	none	none	C.C.W.D. Pa.	reversed
Southern Life Insurance Company v. McCain	84 (1878)	Field	none	none	C.C.S.D. Ala.	affirmed
McAllister v. Kuhn	87 (1878)	Waite	none	none	Sup. Ct. Terr. Utah	affirmed
King v. Pardee	90 (1878)	Bradley	none	none	C.C.W.D. Pa.	affirmed
Davidson v. City of New Orleans	97 (1878)	Miller	Bradley	none	La.	affirmed
Arthur v. Morrison	108 (1878)	Hunt	none	none	C.C.S.D.N.Y.	affirmed
Arthur v. Lahey	112 (1878)	Hunt	none	none	C.C.S.D.N.Y.	affirmed
Arthur v. Unkart	118 (1878)	Hunt	none	none	C.C.S.D.N.Y.	reversed
Arthur v. Zimmerman	124 (1878)	Hunt	none	none	C.C.S.D.N.Y.	affirmed
Arthur v. Stephani	125 (1878)	Hunt	none	none	C.C.S.D.N.Y.	affirmed
Arthur v. Sussfield	128 (1878)	Hunt	none	none	C.C.S.D.N.Y.	affirmed
Murphy v. Arnson	131 (1878)	Hunt	none	none	C.C.S.D.N.Y.	affirmed
Arthur v. Davies	135 (1878)	Hunt	none	none	C.C.S.D.N.Y.	affirmed
Arthur v. Homer	137 (1878)	Hunt	none	none	C.C.S.D.N.Y.	affirmed
Arthur v. Herman	141 (1878)	Hunt	none	none	C.C.S.D.N.Y.	reversed
Arthur v. Rheims	143 (1878)	Hunt	none	none	C.C.S.D.N.Y.	reversed
Arthur v. Goddard	145 (1878)	Hunt	none	none	C.C.S.D.N.Y.	affirmed
Davies v. Arthur	148 (1878)	Clifford	none	none	C.C.S.D.N.Y.	affirmed
Kohlsaat v. Murphy	153 (1878)	Clifford	none	none	C.C.S.D.N.Y.	affirmed
Mitchell v. United States	162 (1878)	Strong	none	none	Ct. Cl.	affirmed
Natoma Water and Mining Company v. Bugbey	165 (1878)	Waite	none	none	Cal.	affirmed
Brawley v. United States	168 (1878)	Bradley	none	none	Ct. Cl.	affirmed
Ferguson v. McLaughlin	174 (1878)	Miller	none	none	Cal.	affirmed
Williams v. Bruffy	176 (1878)	Field	none	none	Va.	reversed
Dewing v. Perdicaries	193 (1878)	Swayne	none	none	C.C.D.S.C.	affirmed
Gold-Washing and Water Company v. Keyes	199 (1878)	Waite	none	Bradley	C.C.D. Cal.	affirmed
Dodge County v. Chandler	205 (1878)	Bradley	none	none	C.C.N.D. Neb.	affirmed
United States v. Clark County	211 (1878)	Strong	none	Waite	C.C.E.D. Mo.	reversed
Werner v. King	218 (1877)	Miller	none	none	C.C.S.D.N.Y.	reversed
United States v. Morrison	232 (1878)	Waite	none	none	Ct. Cl.	affirmed
Knickerbocker Life Insurance Company v. Norton	234 (1878)	Bradley	none	Strong	C.C.N.D. Ill.	affirmed
McLean v. Fleming	245 (1878)	Clifford	none	none	C.C.E.D. Mo.	multiple
Trademark infringement requires a likelihood of misleading purchasers, not exact similitude; with laches, a court may deny past damages but still enjoin future infringement where infringement is clear.
Ohio and Mississippi Railway Company v. McCarthy	258 (1878)	Swayne	none	none	C.C.E.D. Mo.	affirmed
Wheeler v. Union National Bank	268 (1878)	Harlan	none	none	N.Y. Super. Ct.	affirmed
Rock Creek Township v. Strong	271 (1878)	Strong	none	none	C.C.D. Kan.	affirmed
Conrad v. Waples	279 (1878)	Field	none	none	C.C.D. La.	reversed
Burbank v. Conrad	291 (1878)	Field	none	Clifford	La.	affirmed
City of San Antonio v. Mehaffy	312 (1878)	Swayne	none	none	C.C.W.D. Tex.	affirmed
McGarrahan v. New Idria Mining Company	316 (1878)	Waite	none	none	Cal.	affirmed
Ames v. Quimby	324 (1878)	Hunt	none	none	C.C.W.D. Mich.	reversed
Pullman v. Upton	328 (1878)	Strong	none	none	C.C.N.D. Ill.	affirmed
Peugh v. Davis	332 (1878)	Field	none	none	Sup. Ct. D.C.	reversed
Dial v. Reynolds	340 (1878)	Swayne	none	none	C.C.E.D. Tenn.	affirmed
Hitchcock v. City of Galveston	341 (1878)	Strong	none	Bradley	C.C.E.D. Tex.	reversed
Francis v. United States	354 (1878)	Clifford	none	none	Ct. Cl.	affirmed
United States v. Simmons	360 (1878)	Harlan	none	none	C.C.E.D.N.Y.	certification
United States v. Van Auken	366 (1878)	Swayne	none	none	C.C.W.D. Mich.	certification
Ex parte Schollenberger	369 (1878)	Waite	none	none	C.C.E.D. Pa.	mandamus granted
Wisconsin v. City of Duluth	379 (1878)	Miller	none	none	original	dismissed
Huntington v. National Union Savings Bank of the District of Columbia	388 (1878)	Strong	none	none	Sup. Ct. D.C.	affirmed
Dobbins's Distillery v. United States	395 (1878)	Clifford	none	none	C.C.D. Iowa	affirmed
McPherson v. Cox	404 (1878)	Miller	Strong	none	Sup. Ct. D.C.	reversed
United States v. Driscoll	421 (1878)	Swayne	none	none	Ct. Cl.	reversed
Walker v. Johnson	424 (1878)	Miller	none	none	C.C.N.D. Ill.	affirmed
Baird v. United States	430 (1878)	Waite	none	none	Ct. Cl.	affirmed
Murray v. City of Charleston	432 (1878)	Strong	none	Miller	S.C.	reversed
Indianapolis and St. Louis Railroad Company v. Vance	450 (1878)	Harlan	none	none	C.C.S.D. Ill.	affirmed
The Lady Pike	461 (1878)	Clifford	none	none	C.C.E.D. Wis.	affirmed
Casey v. Cavaroc	467 (1878)	Bradley	none	none	C.C.D. La.	reversed
Casey v. National Park Bank of New York	492 (1878)	Bradley	none	none	C.C.D. La.	reversed
Casey v. Schuchardt	494 (1878)	Bradley	none	none	C.C.D. La.	reversed
Casey v. Schneider	496 (1878)	Bradley	none	none	C.C.D.C.	affirmed
Maine Central Railroad Company v. Maine	499 (1878)	Field	none	none	Me.	affirmed
Atherton v. Fowler	513 (1878)	Miller	none	Waite	Cal.	reversed
Richmond, Fredericksburg and Potomac Railroad Company v. City of Richmond	521 (1878)	Waite	none	none	Va.	affirmed
Moore v. Robbins	530 (1878)	Miller	none	none	Ill.	reversed
Tenth National Bank v. Warren	539 (1878)	Hunt	none	none	C.C.S.D.N.Y.	reversed
Wolf v. Stix	541 (1878)	Waite	none	none	Tenn.	dismissed
Union Mutual Life Insurance Company v. Mowry	544 (1878)	Field	none	none	C.C.D.R.I.	reversed
Schumacher v. Cornell	549 (1878)	Swayne	none	none	C.C.E.D. Wis.	reversed
Garfield v. Paris	557 (1878)	Clifford	none	none	C.C.E.D. Mich.	affirmed
United States v. Kaufman	567 (1878)	Waite	none	none	Ct. Cl.	affirmed
Insurance Company v. Eggleston	572 (1878)	Bradley	none	none	N.D. Miss.	affirmed
Bissell v. Heyward	580 (1878)	Hunt	none	none	C.C.D.S.C.	affirmed
Mutual Life Insurance Company v. Brune's Assignee	588 (1878)	Strong	none	none	C.C.D. Md.	affirmed
Railroad Company v. Collector	594 (1878)	Waite	none	none	original	costs granted
Edwards v. Kearzey	595 (1878)	Swayne	Clifford; Hunt	none	N.C.	reversed
Hayward v. Eliot National Bank	611 (1878)	Harlan	none	none	C.C.D. Mass.	affirmed
Gregory v. Morris	619 (1878)	Waite	none	none	Sup. Ct. Terr. Wyo.	affirmed
Brine v. Hartford Insurance Company	627 (1878)	Miller	none	none	C.C.N.D. Ill.	reversed
Union Gold Mining Company v. Rocky Mt. National Bank Company	640 (1878)	Hunt	none	none	Sup. Ct. Terr. Colo.	affirmed
Rocky Mt. National Bank Company v. Gossler	645 (1878)	Clifford	none	none	C.C.D. Mass.	affirmed
Ketchum v. Duncan	659 (1878)	Strong	none	Clifford	C.C.S.D. Ala.	affirmed
Ray County v. Vansycle	675 (1878)	Harlan	none	none	C.C.W.D. Mo.	affirmed
Hawkins v. United States	689 (1877)	Clifford	none	none	Ct. Cl.	affirmed
Felton v. United States	699 (1878)	Field	none	none	C.C.D. Mass.	reversed
Pratt v. Pratt	704 (1878)	Miller	none	Clifford	C.C.N.D. Ill.	reversed
Sage v. Railroad Company	712 (1878)	Waite	none	none	C.C.D. Iowa	dismissal denied
Morgan v. Chicago and Alton Railroad Company	716 (1878)	Swayne	none	none	C.C.N.D. Ill.	affirmed
O'Reilly v. Edrington	724 (1878)	Waite	none	none	C.C.S.D. Miss.	dismissed
Ex parte Jackson	727 (1878)	Field	none	none	C.C.S.D.N.Y.	habeas corpus denied
National Bank v. City of Omaha	737 (1878)	Waite	none	none	C.C.D. Neb.	dismissed
