= Lewis S. Bailey =

American politician

Lewis S. Bailey (1842-1903) was a member of the Wisconsin State Assembly.

== Biography ==
Bailey was born on December 26, 1842, in Greenfield, New York. During the American Civil War, he served with the 115th New York Infantry of the Union Army, originally as an enlisted man and later as an officer. Later, he was chief of the fire department of Oconto, Wisconsin. Bailey died on October 7, 1903.

== Political career ==
Bailey was elected to the Assembly in 1890. Other positions he held include county judge of Oconto County, Wisconsin and justice of the peace. He was a Democrat.
