= FTC v. Raladam =

Federal Trade Commission v. Raladam Co.
- Supreme Court of the United States

Argued January 15, 1931 Decided March 2, 1931
- Full case name: Federal Trade Commission v. Raladam Company
- Citations: 283 U.S. 643 (more)

Holding
- The Federal Trade Commission lacked authority under the Federal Trade Commission Act to prohibit an unfair method of competition absent evidence of injury to competition or competitors.

Court membership
- Chief Justice Charles E. Hughes Associate Justices Oliver W. Holmes Jr. · Willis Van Devanter; James C. McReynolds · Louis Brandeis; George Sutherland · Pierce Butler; Harlan F. Stone · Owen Roberts

Case opinions
- Majority: Sutherland, joined by Hughes, Van Devanter, McReynolds, Butler, Roberts
- Dissent: Brandeis, joined by Holmes, Stone

Laws applied
- Federal Trade Commission Act

Federal Trade Commission v. Raladam Co., 283 U.S. 643 (1931), was a decision of the United States Supreme Court holding that the legality of the Federal Trade Commission's actions remained subject to final judicial review and that § 5 of the Federal Trade Commission Act did not authorize the Commission to prohibit "dangerously misleading advertisements" solely to protect consumers unless the challenged practices also constituted an unfair method of competition by harming competitors or competition. The Court further stated that the phrase "unfair methods of competition" was not susceptible to precise definition, but would instead be developed through "the gradual process of judicial inclusion and exclusion."

== Background ==
The Federal Trade Commission charged Raladam Company with using unfair methods of competition regarding its obesity cure product. The product was advertised as the result of scientific research and represented as a safe and effective means of reducing excess weight without harmful effects. The Federal Trade Commission alleged that these claims were deceptive because the preparation could not be used safely or effectively without medical supervision and that the advertising misled consumers. The FTC further alleged that the company's practices constituted an unfair method of competition because they diverted sales from competitors offering.

The FTC's complaint outlined that Raladam advertised its product misleadingly, presenting it as a scientifically backed remedy. Allegations included that the product could potentially harm the health of users if not taken under medical supervision. The FTC concluded the practices were unfair to both the public and competitors.

After administrative hearings, the Federal Trade Commission found that Raladam's advertising constituted an unfair method of competition and issued a cease-and-desist order prohibiting the company from representing its obesity remedy as scientifically validated or as a safe treatment for obesity unless accompanied by a warning that it could not be used safely except under medical supervision. The United States Court of Appeals for the Sixth Circuit reversed the order.

The Supreme Court granted certiorari limited to whether the FTC had jurisdiction under § 5 of the Federal Trade Commission Act.

== Legal background ==
Congress enacted the Federal Trade Commission Act of 1914 to prohibit "unfair methods of competition" in interstate commerce through § 5. During the early 1920s, the Federal Trade Commission argued that deceptive advertising fell within the statute's prohibition. The Commission subsequently expanded its enforcement efforts against deceptive advertising and other consumer protection practices, and by 1925 such cases accounted for roughly seventy percent of its cease-and-desist orders.

The Supreme Court first interpreted the "unfair methods of competition" prohibition in Federal Trade Commission v. Gratz (1920), holding that § 5 was not intended to interfere with "free and fair competition as commonly understood and practiced by honorable opponents in trade." In Federal Trade Commission v. Beech-Nut Packing Co. (1922), the Court upheld the Commission's challenge to a resale price maintenance scheme, treating the Sherman Antitrust Act of 1890 as an important guide in determining what constituted an unfair method of competition. The Court subsequently applied § 5 to deceptive advertising in Federal Trade Commission v. Winsted Hosiery Co. (1922), concluding that false labeling violated the Act because it diverted trade from competitors who truthfully labeled their products. In Federal Trade Commission v. Sinclair Refining Co. (1923), however, the Court cautioned that § 5 did not authorize the Commission "to interfere with ordinary business methods or to prescribe arbitrary standards" of competition.

== Supreme Court ==
The Court accepted the Commission's findings that the advertisements were misleading and that the "obesity cure" could not safely be used without medical supervision, but held that § 5 did not authorize the FTC to police deceptive advertising to protect consumers unless it also harmed competitors.

The Court emphasized three requirements for the FTC to act:

1. The methods used must be deemed unfair.
2. The methods must be part of competition in commerce.
3. The Commission must believe that intervening would serve the public interest.

The Court reviewed the legislative history of the Federal Trade Commission Act of 1914, noting that Congress had replaced the bill's original prohibition on "unfair competition" with the broader phrase "unfair methods of competition." Although the Court recognized that the revised language expanded the Act's scope, it concluded that the phrase was not susceptible to precise definition and would instead be developed through "the gradual process of judicial inclusion and exclusion," quoting Davidson v. New Orleans.

The Court interpreted § 5's public-interest requirement as directing the FTC to protect the public from the harms caused by the destruction or substantial restriction of competition. Quoting Federal Trade Commission v. Klesner, Sutherland said the required public interest must be "specific and substantial" and concluded that protecting the public from "dangerously misleading advertisements" did not qualify because it exceeded the FTC's statutory authority. The Court maintained that the legality of the FTC's actions were subject to final review.

Finding the evidence of competition insufficient to support the Commission's order, the Court declined to uphold the FTC's cease-and-desist order.

== Aftermath ==
The decision limited § 5 to practices that harmed competition, leaving deceptive practices that injured consumers without affecting competition outside the FTC's authority. Congress responded by enacting the Wheeler–Lea Act of 1938, which added a prohibition on "unfair or deceptive acts or practices" and established the FTC's consumer protection authority separately from its competition authority under § 5.

The FTC prevailed in a later proceeding against Raladam, FTC v. Raladam Co., 316 U.S. 149 (1942). In that case, the Supreme Court held that the Commission could infer competitive injury from deceptive claims concerning products in active competition with other merchandise, without requiring proof of actual sales diversion from specific competitors.

Following political and judicial developments in the 1970s and 1980s, the Commission generally adopted a more cautious approach to § 5 competition enforcement and increasingly aligned it with Sherman Act doctrine. Raladam has generally been cited by the FTC in policy statements on unfairness jurisdiction for its discussion of Davidson v. New Orleans and the process of defining statutory terms that lack precise boundaries.

== Works cited ==
- Averitt, Neil W. (1980). "The Meaning of "Unfair Methods of Competition" in Section 5 of the Federal Trade Commission Act" (PDF). Boston College Law Review. 21 (2): 227–300.
- Beer, Henry Ward (1932). "Federal Trade Commission and Its Due Process of Law". Notre Dame Law Review. 7 (2): 170–184.
- Crane, Daniel A. (2021). "Antitrust Antitextualism" (PDF). Notre Dame Law Review. 96 (3): 1205–1256.
- Ohlhausen, Maureen K. (2015). "Weigh the Label, Not the Tractor: What Goes on the Scale in an FTC Unfairness Cost-Benefit Analysis?". George Washington Law Review. 83 (6): 1998–2026.
- Werden, Gregory J. (May 2023). Unfair Methods of Competition under Section 5 of the Federal Trade Commission Act: What Is the Intelligible Principle? (Report). Mercatus Working Paper. Arlington, VA: Mercatus Center at George Mason University.
