= Oakdale, Wisconsin =

- Village
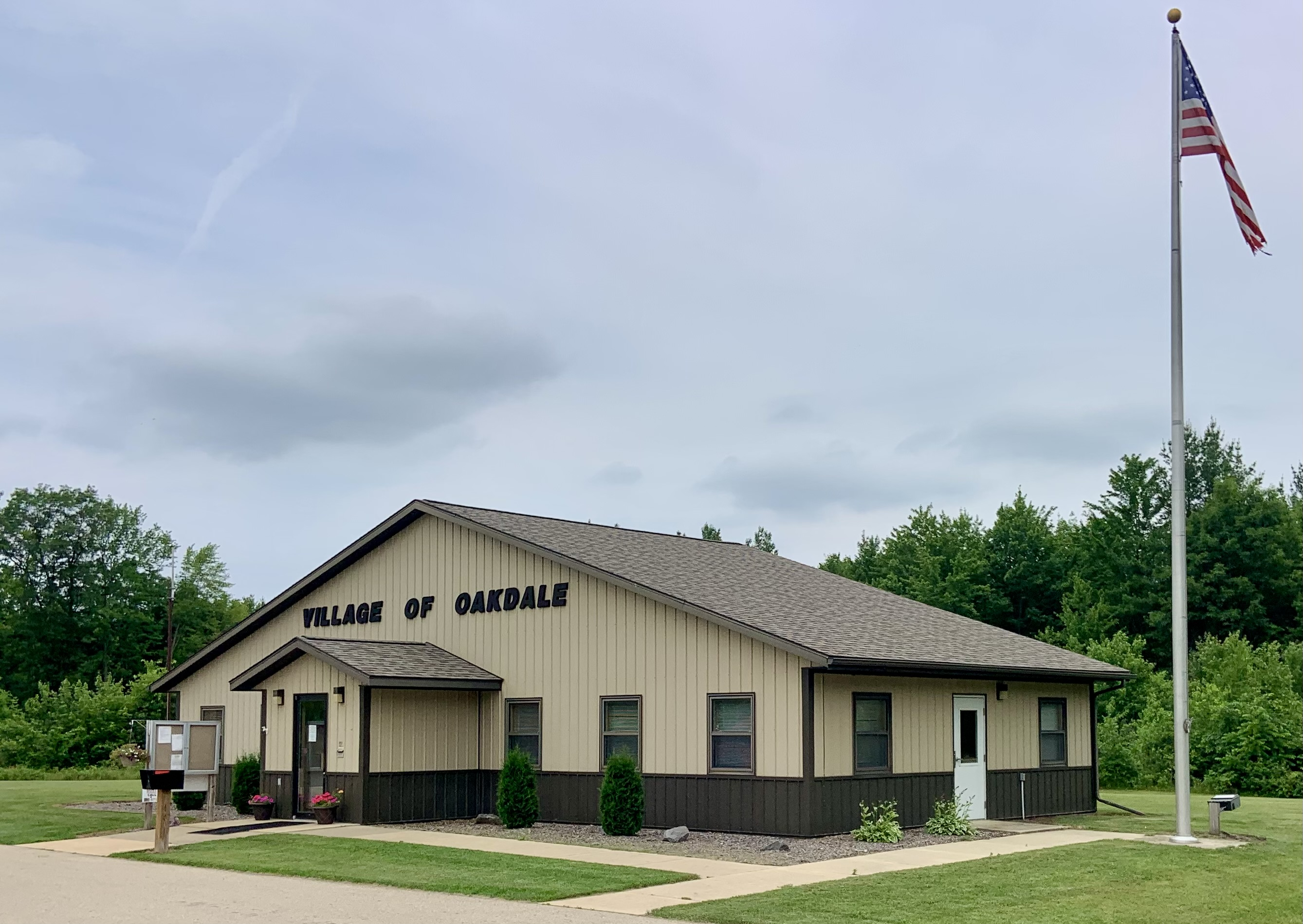
- Oakdale Village Hall

- Location of Oakdale in Monroe County, Wisconsin.
- Coordinates: 43°56′45″N 90°22′10″W
- Country: United States
- State: Wisconsin
- County: Monroe
- Incorporated: February 18, 1988

Area
  - Total: 0.74 sq mi (1.92 km^{2})
  - Land: 0.74 sq mi (1.92 km^{2})
  - Water: 0 sq mi (0.00 km^{2})
- Elevation: 948 ft (289 m)

Population (2020)
  - Total: 302
  - Density: 395.6/sq mi (152.74/km^{2})
- Time zone: UTC-6 (Central (CST))
  - Summer (DST): UTC-5 (CDT)
- Area code: 608
- FIPS code: 55-58875
- GNIS feature ID: 1583836
- Website: https://villageofoakdalewi.gov/

Oakdale is a village in Monroe County, Wisconsin, United States. The population was 302 at the 2020 census. The village is located within the Town of Oakdale.

== Geography ==
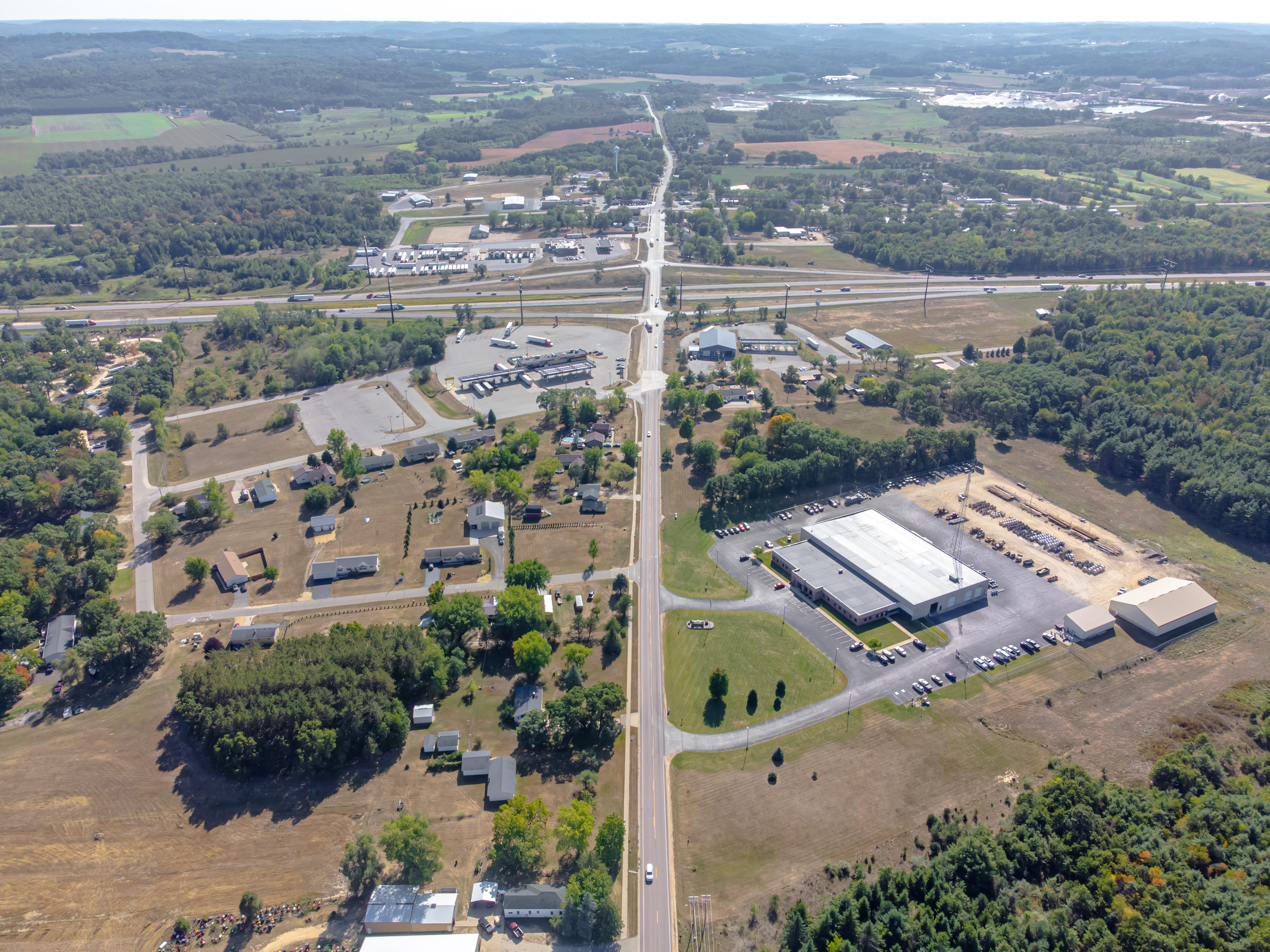
I-90 runs through the village

Oakdale is located at 43°57′32″N 90°22′43″W (43.958986, -90.378844).

According to the United States Census Bureau, the village has a total area of 0.86 square miles (2.23 km^{2}), all land.

== Demographics ==
Historical population
Census	Pop.	Note	%±
1990	162		—
2000	297		83.3%
2010	297		0.0%
2020	302		1.7%
U.S. Decennial Census

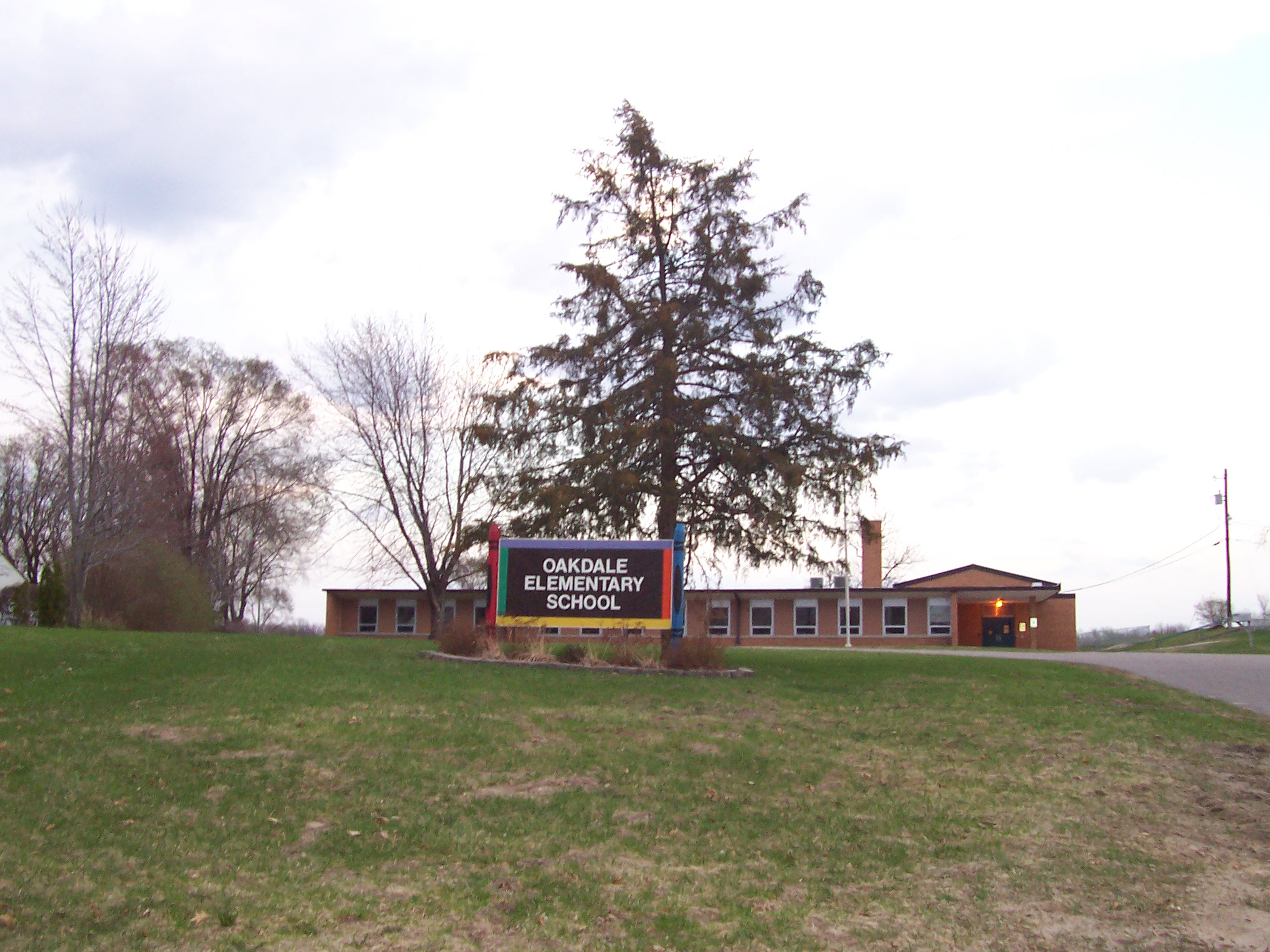
Oakdale Elementary School

=== 2010 census ===
As of the census of 2010, there were 297 people, 129 households, and 75 families living in the village. The population density was 345.3 inhabitants per square mile (133.3/km^{2}). There were 137 housing units at an average density of 159.3 per square mile (61.5/km^{2}). The racial makeup of the village was 98.3% White, 0.7% African American, 0.7% Native American, and 0.3% Asian.

There were 129 households, of which 30.2% had children under the age of 18 living with them, 42.6% were married couples living together, 9.3% had a female householder with no husband present, 6.2% had a male householder with no wife present, and 41.9% were non-families. 32.6% of all households were made up of individuals, and 11.6% had someone living alone who was 65 years of age or older. The average household size was 2.30 and the average family size was 2.96.

The median age in the village was 39.8 years. 25.3% of residents were under the age of 18; 5% were between the ages of 18 and 24; 26.7% were from 25 to 44; 27.6% were from 45 to 64; and 15.5% were 65 years of age or older. The gender makeup of the village was 50.8% male and 49.2% female.

=== 2000 census ===
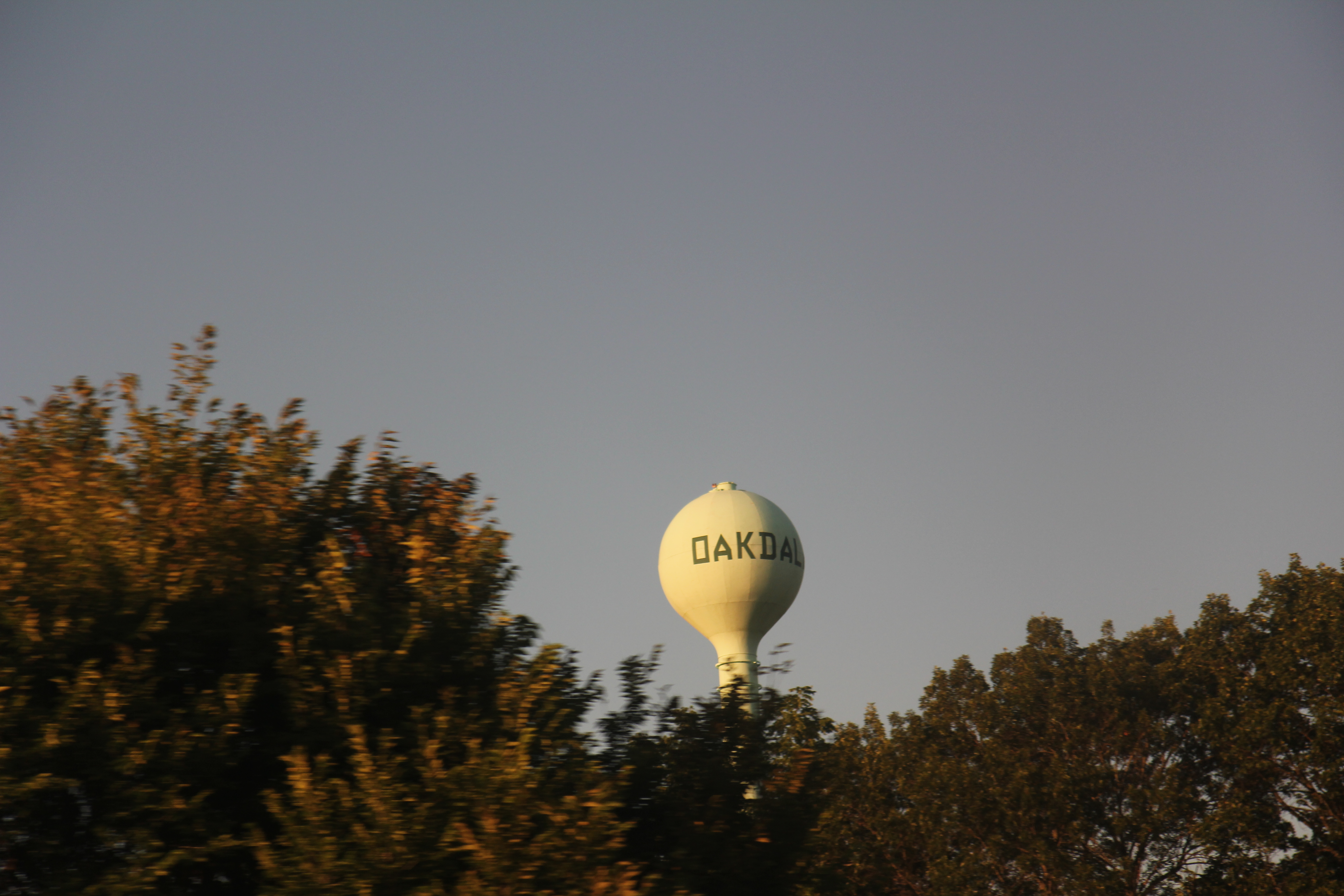
Water tower

As of the census of 2000, there were 297 people, 112 households, and 73 families living in the village. The population density was 352.9 people per square mile (136.5/km^{2}). There were 127 housing units at an average density of 150.9 per square mile (58.4/km^{2}). The racial makeup of the village was 98.65% White, 0.34% Native American, and 1.01% from two or more races. 0.34% of the population were Hispanic or Latino of any race.

There were 112 households, out of which 31.3% had children under the age of 18 living with them, 47.3% were married couples living together, 9.8% had a female householder with no husband present, and 34.8% were non-families. 23.2% of all households were made up of individuals, and 8.9% had someone living alone who was 65 years of age or older. The average household size was 2.65 and the average family size was 3.07.

In the village, the population was spread out, with 27.3% under the age of 18, 6.7% from 18 to 24, 35.7% from 25 to 44, 18.9% from 45 to 64, and 11.4% who were 65 years of age or older. The median age was 35 years. For every 100 females, there were 106.3 males. For every 100 females age 18 and over, there were 109.7 males.

The median income for a household in the village was $35,500, and the median income for a family was $36,667. Males had a median income of $30,833 versus $20,250 for females. The per capita income for the village was $14,440. About 4.7% of families and 9.6% of the population were below the poverty line, including 12.1% of those under the age of eighteen and none of those 65 or over.
