= Alexander Brazeau =

American politician

Alexander Brazeau was an American politician. He was a member of the Wisconsin State Assembly.

== Biography ==
Brazeau was born on December 24, 1856, in Oconto, Wisconsin. He would attend Lawrence University. Eventually, he became a lawyer and newspaper publisher.

== Political career ==
Brazeau was a member of the Assembly in 1883. Additionally, he was City Attorney and an alderman of Oconto. In 1879, he was an unsuccessful candidate for District Attorney of Oconto County, Wisconsin. He was a Democrat.
