= Louis P. Pahl =

Politician

Louis P. Pahl (October 13, 1833 – April 3, 1891) was a member of the Wisconsin State Assembly.

== Biography ==
Pahl was born on October 13, 1833, in the Kingdom of Württemberg. He married Margaret Louisa Riley and together they had four children. Pahl died on April 3, 1891, from Bright's disease of the kidneys (nephritis).

== Career ==
Pahl was a member of the Assembly during the 1876 session. Other positions he held include treasurer of Oconto, Wisconsin. He was a member of the Reform Party.
