= Pahl Davis =

American football player (1897–1946)

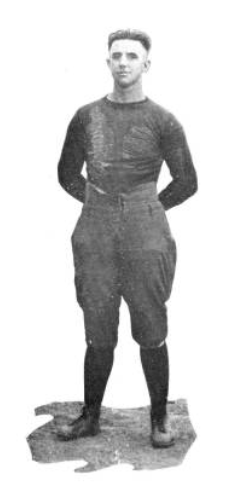

No. 2
- Positions: Guard, fullback

Personal information
- Born: March 26, 1897; Oconto, Wisconsin, U.S.
- Died: April 13, 1946 (aged 49); Oconto, Wisconsin, U.S.
- Listed height: 5 ft 10 in (1.78 m)
- Listed weight: 185 lb (84 kg)

Career information
- High school: Oconto (WI)
- College: Wisconsin-Oshkosh (?); Marquette (1919–1921)

Career history
- Green Bay Packers (1922); Bessemer American Legion (1923)

Career statistics
- Games played: 5 or 7
- Games started: 2
- Stats at Pro Football Reference

Pahl George Davis (March 26, 1897 – April 13, 1946) was an American professional football player. He played college football for the Wisconsin–Oshkosh Titans and the Marquette Hilltoppers. After college, he played one season professionally in the National Football League (NFL) with the Green Bay Packers. During his career, Davis played as a guard and fullback.

== Early life ==
Davis was born on March 26, 1897, in Oconto, Wisconsin. He attended Oconto High School before moving on to Oshkosh State Normal School (now known as the University of Wisconsin–Oshkosh) and then Marquette University. He was the first NFL player from Oconto High School and was one of four Oshkosh NFL players all-time.

Davis attended Marquette from 1919 to 1921. He played football for the Marquette Hilltoppers in all three of those years and also played basketball at Marquette in 1920 and 1921. He received varsity letters with the football team in 1920 and 1921. In football, he was initially a fullback before being moved to lineman due to injuries to others at the position. The Hilltop, Marquette's yearbook, described him as "a real Marquetter, a hard fighter and a regular fellow". In his three years on the football team, they compiled records of 5–1–2, 7–2 and 6–2–1, respectively. He graduated with a bachelor's degree in economics. He was known as the "Iron Man of Marquette" and according to the Ironwood Daily Globe was considered one of the school's greatest linemen.

== Professional career and later life ==
Davis signed with the Green Bay Packers of the NFL in 1922. The Green Bay Press-Gazette wrote of him that, "Davis can either play fullback or jump into a line position and make good. He is a handy man to have around. Davis is big and husky and can take an awful pounding". During the 1922 NFL season, he appeared in between five and seven games, (Note: Sources conflict.) two as a starter, while being used as a guard and fullback. The 1922 Packers compiled a record of 4–3–3. He later played for the Bessemer American Legion team in 1923.

Davis lived his entire life in Oconto. As of 1931, he was operating a store there. He also worked in insurance and was a health official in Oconto. Davis was a member of the Knights of Columbus, Elks Club and American Legion. He married Alice Belongia on March 1, 1924. He died on April 13, 1946, at the age of 49.
