= Frank J. Lingelbach =

American businessman and politician

Frank J. Lingelbach (July 7, 1888 – June 7, 1947) was an American businessman and politician.

Born in Sheboygan, Wisconsin, Lingelbach grew up in Oconto, Wisconsin. He went to Green Bay Business College and was in the insurance and real estate business. From 1927 to 1934, Lingelbach served on the Oconto County, Wisconsin Board of Supervisors and was chairman of the board. In 1937, Lingelbach served in the Wisconsin State Assembly and was a Democrat. Lingelbach died of a heart attack at his home in Oconto, Wisconsin.
