= Davidson v. City of New Orleans =

Davidson v. New Orleans
- Supreme Court of the United States
- Full case name: Davidson v. New Orleans
- Citations: 96 U.S. 97 (more) 6 Otto 97; 24 L. Ed. 616

Case opinions
- Majority: Miller, joined by Waite, Clifford, Swayne, Field, Strong, Hunt, Harlan
- Concurrence: Bradley

Davidson v. New Orleans, 96 U.S. 97 (1878), was a United States Supreme Court case in which the Court upheld a Louisiana statute that provided for special assessments against property for drainage purposes.
