= Tony Dollinger =

American football player (born 1962)

No. 44
- Position: Running back

Personal information
- Born: October 18, 1962 (age 64); Winter Park, Florida, U.S.
- Listed height: 5 ft 11 in (1.80 m)
- Listed weight: 205 lb (93 kg)

Career information
- High school: Oconto (WI)
- College: Evangel
- NFL draft: 1986: undrafted

Career history
- Dallas Cowboys (1986)*; Detroit Lions (1987); Stockport Falcons (1988-1989); Manchester Spartans (1990)
- * Offseason or practice squad member only

Career NFL statistics
- Rushing yards: 22
- Rushing average: 2.8
- Receptions: 3
- Receiving yards: 25
- Stats at Pro Football Reference

Tony Dollinger (born October 18, 1962) played for the Detroit Lions briefly during the 1987 NFL season and overseas in the BAFA National Leagues 1988–1990. He was a running back. At Evangel University he was a 1st team All-American, and the university's first 3-time All-American in any sport as a 3-time All-American in football.

== Website ==
Tony Dollinger
