= Gustavis A. Willard =

American politician

Gustavis A. Willard was a member of the Wisconsin State Assembly.

== Biography ==
Willard was born in January 1840 in Maine. He was married to Patience Willard and would have eight children. Willard died in Sheboygan, Wisconsin in 1925 and was buried there.

== Career ==
Willard was a member of the Assembly during the 1878 session. Willard was a Democrat.
