= Ex parte Jackson =

- Supreme Court of the United States

Decided October 1, 1878
- Full case name: Ex parte Jackson
- Citations: 96 U.S. 727 (more) 6 Otto 727; 24 L. Ed. 877

Court membership
- Chief Justice Morrison Waite Associate Justices Nathan Clifford · Noah H. Swayne; Samuel F. Miller · Stephen J. Field; William Strong · Joseph P. Bradley; Ward Hunt · John M. Harlan

Case opinion
- Majority: Field, joined by unanimous

Ex parte Jackson, 96 U.S. 727 (1878), was a United States Supreme Court ex parte decision. The case decided that the United States Post Office may open and inspect mail to limit the transmission of circulars on lotteries. It also extended Fourth Amendment protections to private letters, holding that letters and sealed packages sent through the mail required warrants to be searched through.
