= James Mullowney =

American politician

James Mullowney was a member of the Wisconsin State Assembly in 1878 and 1879. He was a Democrat. Additionally, he was a deputy sheriff and Undersheriff of Juneau County, Wisconsin. Mullowney was born on August 1, 1841, in Troy, New York.
