= Frederic George Barlow =

American politician

Frederic George Barlow was an American politician and a Republican. He was a member of the Wisconsin State Assembly during the 1878 session and was the Chairman (similar to Mayor) of Rock Creek, Wisconsin. Barlow was born on July 26, 1839, in Stratford, New Hampshire. he died on May 13 1900
