= Uriah Wood =

American politician (1830–1913)

Uriah Wood (December 21 or 25, 1830 – 1913) was a member of the Wisconsin State Assembly during the 1878 session. A Republican, he represented the 1st District of Fond du Lac County, Wisconsin.

Wood was born on December 21 or 25, 1830 in Schoharie County, New York, the son of David I. Wood (1797–1883) and Marie Vader (or Vedder) Wood. He married Lucy Agnes Mares in Fond du Lac, Wisconsin in 1855. He died in 1913.
