= Oconto – J. Douglas Bake Municipal Airport =

Oconto – J. Douglas Bake Municipal Airport (KOCQ)
- IATA: none; ICAO: KOCQ; FAA LID: OCQ

Summary
- Airport type: Public
- Owner: Oconto City and County
- Serves: Oconto, Wisconsin
- Opened: March 1948
- Time zone: CST (UTC−06:00)
  - Summer (DST): CDT (UTC−05:00)
- Elevation AMSL: 604 ft / 184 m
- Coordinates: 44°52′27″N 087°54′35″W

Map
- Location of airport in Wisconsin OCQ (the United States)

Runways
Direction	Length		Surface
Direction	ft	m	Surface
11/29	3,198	975	Asphalt
4/22	1,840	561	Turf

Statistics
- Aircraft operations (2021): 11,620
- Based aircraft (2024): 19
- Source: Federal Aviation Administration

Oconto – J. Douglas Bake Municipal Airport (KOCQ) (ICAO: KOCQ, FAA LID: OCQ) is a public use airport located two nautical miles (4 km) southwest of the central business district of Oconto, a city in Oconto County, Wisconsin, United States. It is owned by Oconto City and County. It is included in the Federal Aviation Administration (FAA) National Plan of Integrated Airport Systems for 2025–2029, in which it is categorized as a local general aviation facility.

Although many U.S. airports use the same three-letter location identifier for the FAA and IATA, this facility is assigned OCQ by the FAA but has no designation from the IATA.

== Facilities and aircraft ==
Oconto – J. Douglas Bake Municipal Airport (KOCQ) covers an area of 304 acres (123 ha) at an elevation of 604 feet (184 m) above mean sea level. It has two runways: 11/29 is 3,198 by 75 feet (975 x 23 m) with an asphalt surface and 4/22 is 1,840 by 150 feet (561 x 46 m) with a turf surface.

For the 12-month period ending September 14, 2021, the airport had 11,620 aircraft operations, an average of 32 per day: 99% general aviation, 1% air taxi and less than 1% military. In August 2024, there were 19 aircraft based at this airport: all 19 single-engine.

== See also ==
- List of airports in Wisconsin
