= Archibald Campbell (Wisconsin politician) =

American politician

An 1878 portrait of Archibald Campbell

Archibald Campbell was an American politician. He was a member of the Wisconsin State Senate from 1878 to 1879. He was a Republican.
