= Ernst Funke =

American businessman and politician

Carl Ernst Funke (January 20, 1835 – January 29, 1906) was an American businessman and politician.

== Biography ==
Funke was born in Lützen, Kingdom of Prussia. He emigrated to the United States in 1853 and settled in Oconto, Wisconsin. Funke was in the rope manufacturing business. Funke served on the Oconto Village Board and then served as mayor of Oconto. He also served on the Oconto County Board of Supervisors. Funke served in the Wisconsin Assembly in 1878 and 1881, and was a Republican. He also served as postmaster for Oconto, Wisconsin. Funke was also in the hardware and hotel business in Oconto.
