= Charles Burnham (politician) =

American politician

Charles Taylor Burnham (September 18, 1847 – February 27, 1908) was an American manufacturer of bricks from Milwaukee, Wisconsin, who served one term as an Independent Greenback member of the Wisconsin State Assembly.

== Background ==
Burnham was born September 18, 1847, in Milwaukee, son of George and Barbara (Grider) Burnham, who had come to Milwaukee from Buffalo, New York. He was educated in Milwaukee Public Schools, and in the spring of 1870 joined his father in running the family brick factory, gradually taking management of it over along with his younger brother John Burnham.

== Public office ==
When elected to the Assembly in 1877 to represent the 8th Milwaukee County district (the Eighth and Eleventh Wards of the City of Milwaukee), Burnham ran as an "Independent Greenback", winning with 771 votes to 537 for the incumbent, Democrat Peter Salentine and 87 for Socialist William Stange. He was assigned to the standing committee on education. He was not a candidate for re-election in 1878, and was succeeded by Republican Henry P. Fischer.

== Later years ==
Burnhanm was generally identified as a Republican; he served for some time on the Milwaukee Board of School Directors, as had his father before him. The brick firm which came to be known as Burnham Brothers employed 300 workers, making 30 million bricks a year. The brothers turned the firm into the Milwaukee Building Supply Company, of which Charles remained president until his death; and controlled the small Crooked Creek Railroad and Coal Company in Iowa. Their father's estate, when it was filed for probate in 1889, was estimated to be worth US$2 million, of which Charles was one-fourth heir (he was also an executor).

Charles owned part of the Standard Brick Company, timber and mineral land in Wisconsin and northern Michigan, and mineral lands in Texas.

Burnham married Virginia Johnston of Mackinac Island, Michigan; they had three children, and were members of the local Congregationalist church.

Burnham died February 27, 1908, after having been ill for some time. He had lived in Milwaukee all his life. He is buried in Forest Home Cemetery.
