= Bloomfield, Waushara County, Wisconsin =

Bloomfield, Wisconsin
- Town
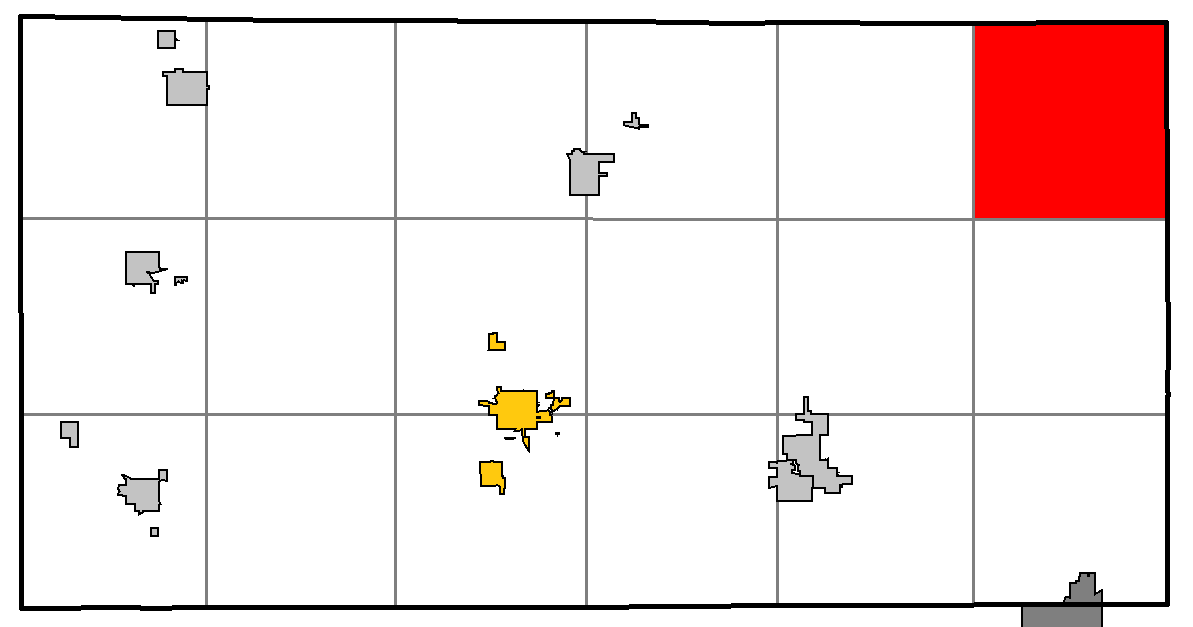
- Location of Bloomfield, Waushara County, Wisconsin

- Location of Waushara County, Wisconsin
- Coordinates: 44°11′39″N 88°56′12″W
- Country: United States
- State: Wisconsin
- County: Waushara

Area
  - Total: 35.9 sq mi (92.9 km^{2})
  - Land: 35.4 sq mi (91.7 km^{2})
  - Water: 0.46 sq mi (1.2 km^{2})
- Elevation: 801 ft (244 m)

Population (2020)
  - Total: 1,054
  - Density: 29.8/sq mi (11.5/km^{2})
- Time zone: UTC-6 (Central (CST))
  - Summer (DST): UTC-5 (CDT)
- FIPS code: 55-08300
- GNIS feature ID: 1582833
- Website: https://townbloomfield.com/

Bloomfield is a town in Waushara County, Wisconsin, United States. The population was 1,054 at the 2020 census. The census-designated place of Tustin is located in the town. The unincorporated communities of Brushville and West Bloomfield are also located in the town. The unincorporated community of Metz is also located partially within the town.

== Geography ==
According to the United States Census Bureau, the town has a total area of 35.9 square miles (92.9 km^{2}), of which 35.4 square miles (91.7 km^{2}) is land and 0.5 square mile (1.2 km^{2}) (1.28%) is water.

== Demographics ==
As of the census of 2000, there were 1,018 people, 383 households, and 297 families residing in the town. The population density was 28.7 people per square mile (11.1/km^{2}). There were 454 housing units at an average density of 12.8 per square mile (5.0/km^{2}). The racial makeup of the town was 99.12% White, 0.20% Native American, 0.20% Asian, and 0.49% from two or more races. Hispanic or Latino of any race were 0.10% of the population.

There were 383 households, out of which 32.9% had children under the age of 18 living with them, 69.7% were married couples living together, 4.2% had a female householder with no husband present, and 22.2% were non-families. 19.1% of all households were made up of individuals, and 8.1% had someone living alone who was 65 years of age or older. The average household size was 2.65 and the average family size was 3.01.

In the town, the population was spread out, with 24.9% under the age of 18, 6.7% from 18 to 24, 29.2% from 25 to 44, 27.0% from 45 to 64, and 12.3% who were 65 years of age or older. The median age was 40 years. For every 100 females, there were 111.6 males. For every 100 females age 18 and over, there were 107.3 males.

The median income for a household in the town was $42,222, and the median income for a family was $49,643. Males had a median income of $35,588 versus $24,821 for females. The per capita income for the town was $19,161. About 5.7% of families and 8.1% of the population were below the poverty line, including 9.9% of those under age 18 and 10.7% of those age 65 or over.
