= Oakdale (town), Wisconsin =

Coordinates: 43°55′22″N 90°22′19″W

Oakdale, Wisconsin
- Town
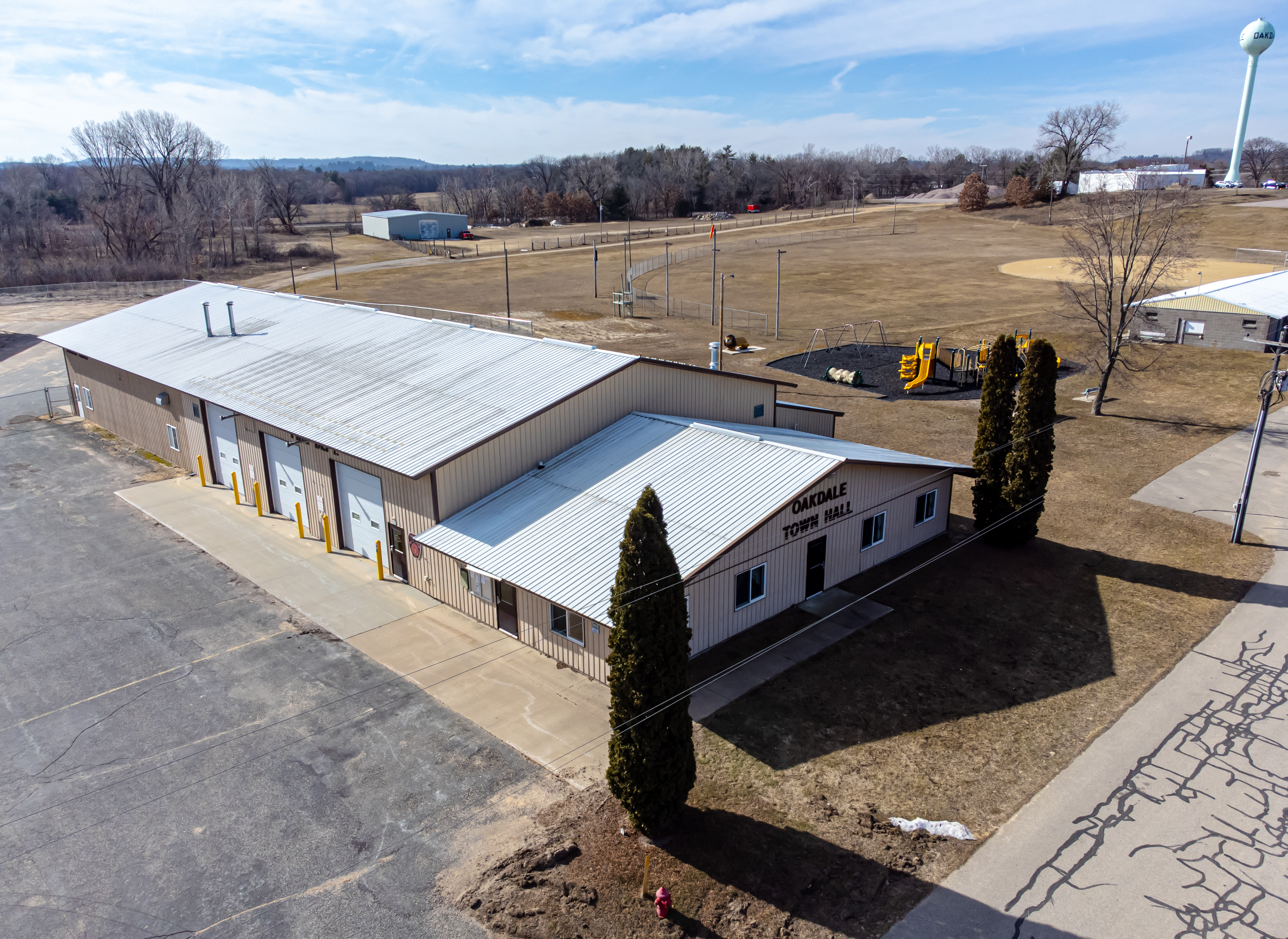
- Oakdale town hall

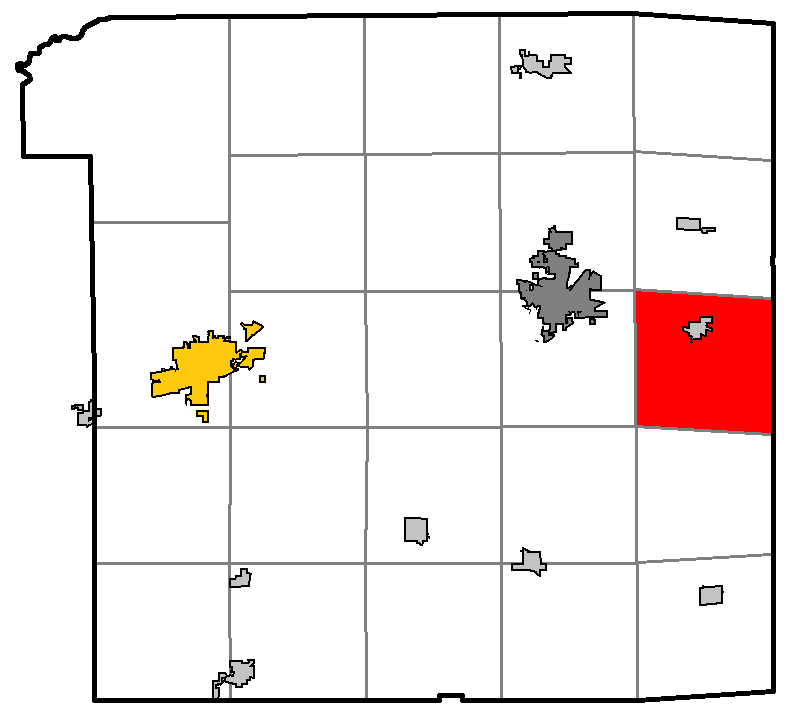
- Location of Oakdale, Monroe County

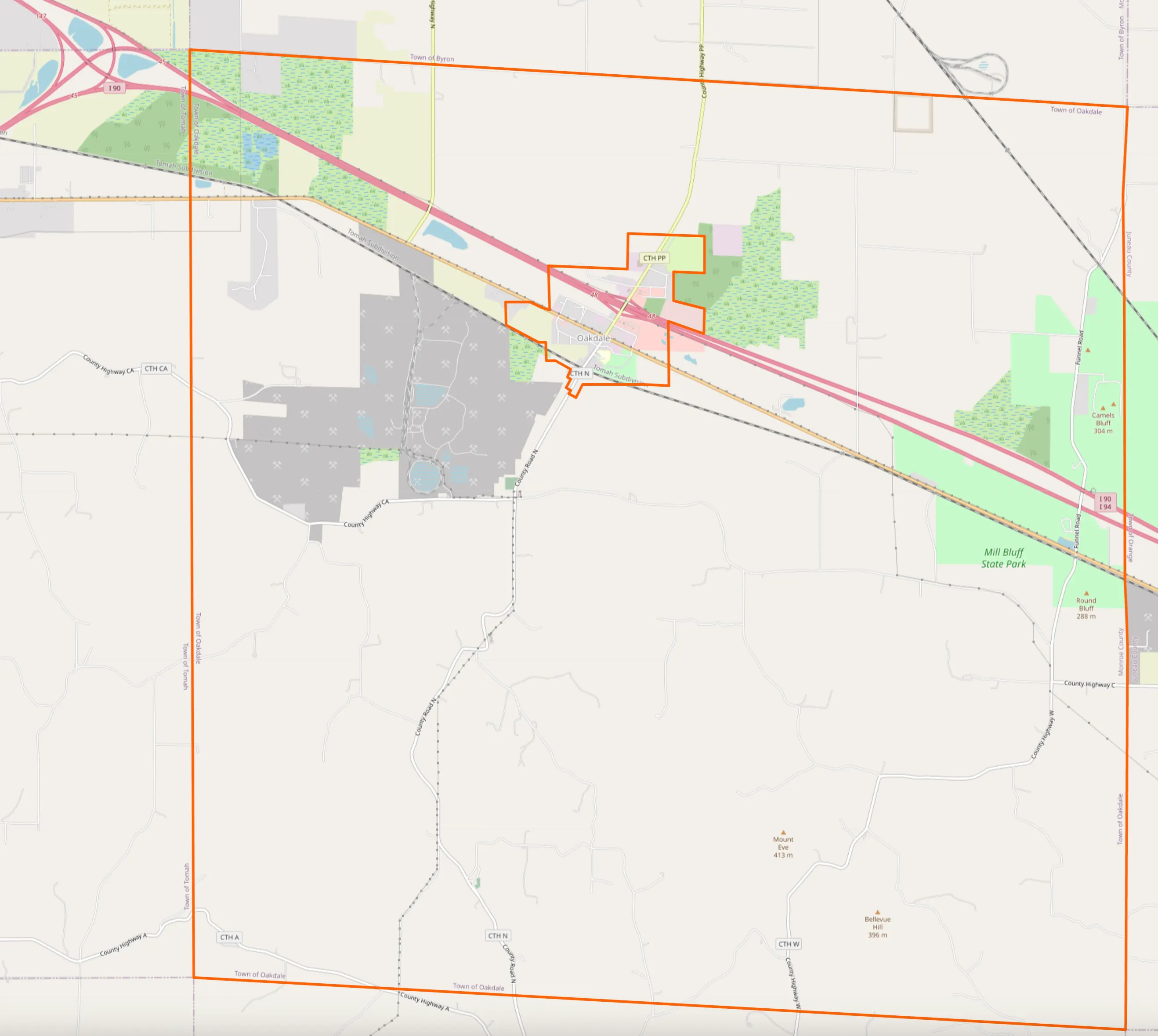
- Click to view map
- Country: United States
- State: Wisconsin
- County: Monroe

Area
  - Total: 35.75 sq mi (92.6 km^{2})
  - Land: 35.68 sq mi (92.4 km^{2})
  - Water: 0.08 sq mi (0.21 km^{2})

Population (2020)
  - Total: 754
  - Density: 21.1/sq mi (8.16/km^{2})

Oakdale is a town in Monroe County, Wisconsin, United States. The population was 754 at the 2020 census. The Village of Oakdale is located within the town.

== Geography ==
According to the United States Census Bureau, the town has a total area of 35.7 square miles (92.5 km^{2}), of which 35.6 square miles (92.3 km^{2}) is land and 0.1 square mile (0.2 km^{2}) (0.22%) is water.

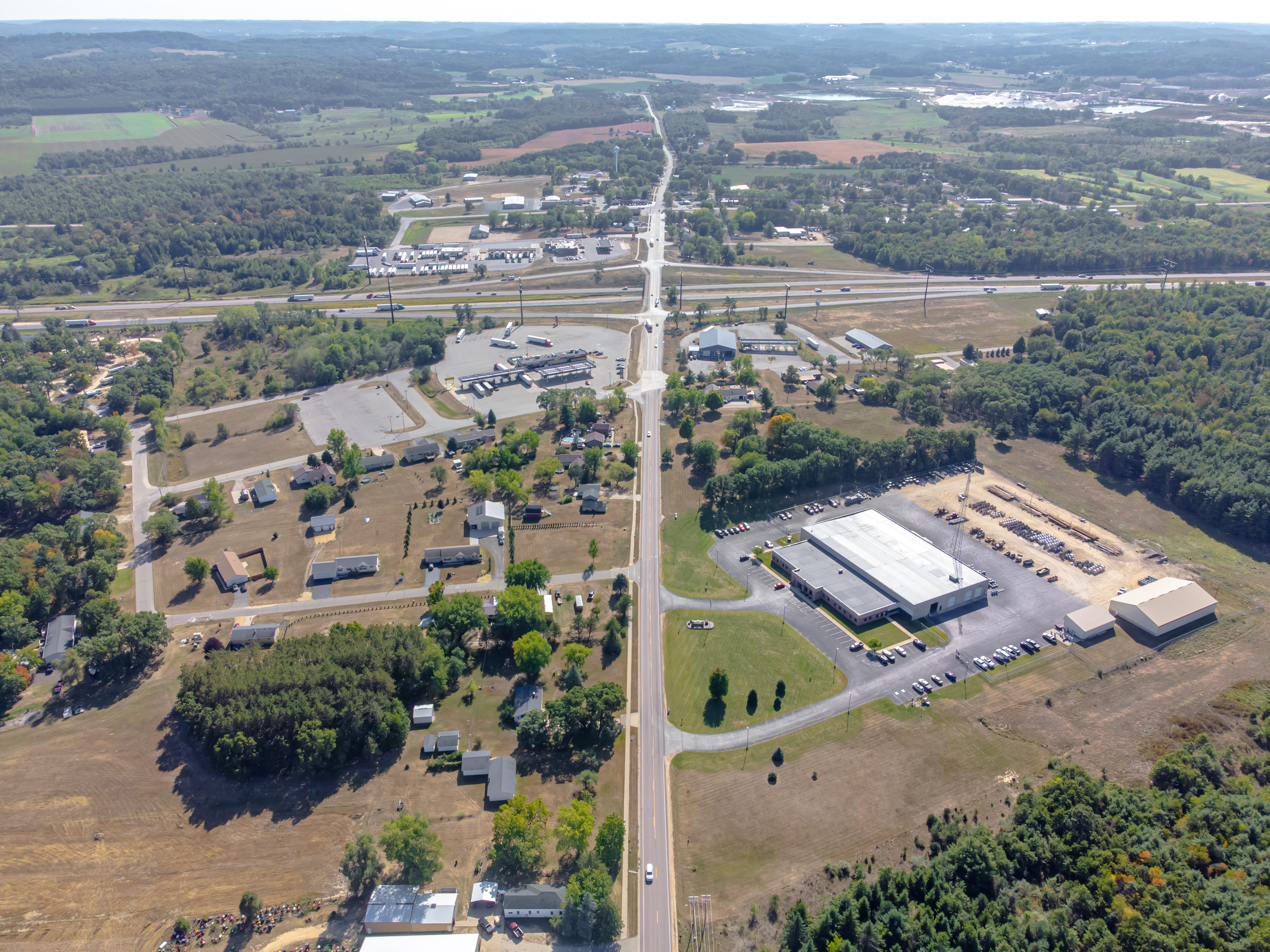
Oakdale, Wisconsin

== Demographics ==
As of the census of 2000, there were 679 people, 233 households, and 195 families residing in the town. The population density was 19.1 people per square mile (7.4/km^{2}). There were 255 housing units at an average density of 7.2 per square mile (2.8/km^{2}). The racial makeup of the town was 95.58% White, 0.29% Black or African American, 2.21% Native American, 0.59% Asian, 0.29% from other races, and 1.03% from two or more races. 0.59% of the population were Hispanic or Latino of any race.

There were 233 households, out of which 42.5% had children under the age of 18 living with them, 76.0% were married couples living together, 4.3% had a female householder with no husband present, and 16.3% were non-families. 12.9% of all households were made up of individuals, and 6.4% had someone living alone who was 65 years of age or older. The average household size was 2.91 and the average family size was 3.16.

In the town, the population was spread out, with 29.9% under the age of 18, 7.5% from 18 to 24, 29.5% from 25 to 44, 22.1% from 45 to 64, and 11.0% who were 65 years of age or older. The median age was 36 years. For every 100 females, there were 114.9 males. For every 100 females age 18 and over, there were 106.1 males.

The median income for a household in the town was $47,273, and the median income for a family was $55,074. Males had a median income of $32,361 versus $22,188 for females. The per capita income for the town was $19,199. About 4.8% of families and 7.8% of the population were below the poverty line, including 11.4% of those under age 18 and 10.3% of those age 65 or over.

== Economy ==
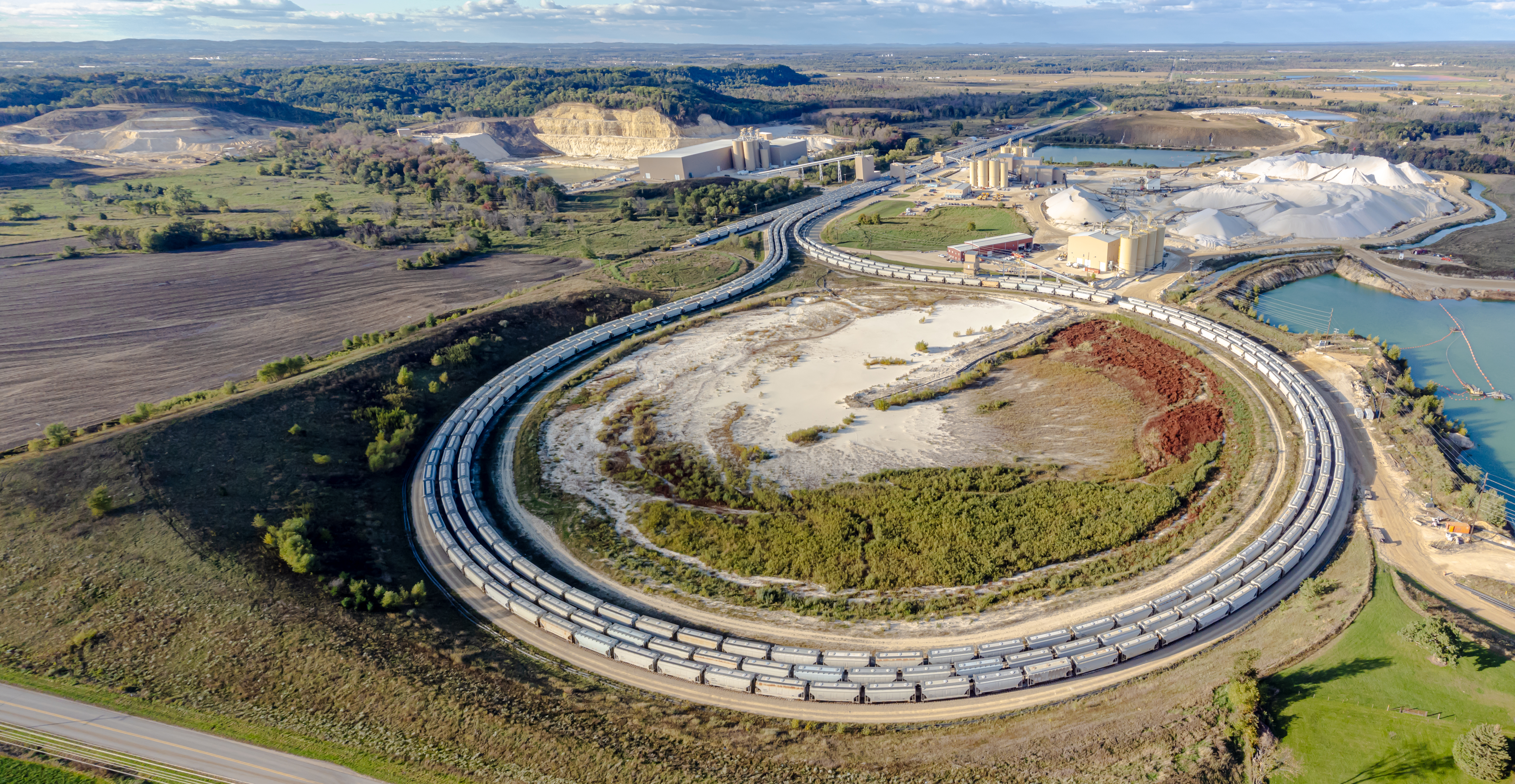
Frac sand mine in the Town of Oakdale with a large looped track with 3 rail lines

Smart Sand Inc. has a fracking sand mine in the Town of Oakdale that covers over 1,000 acres. In 2016 the company built out a $10 million railroad terminal that comprises almost seven miles of looped track which could accommodate four trains longer than 1.5 miles each.

== See also ==
- Interstate 90
- Interstate 94
