= 30th Wisconsin Legislature =

Wisconsin legislative term for 1877

←	29th	31st	→
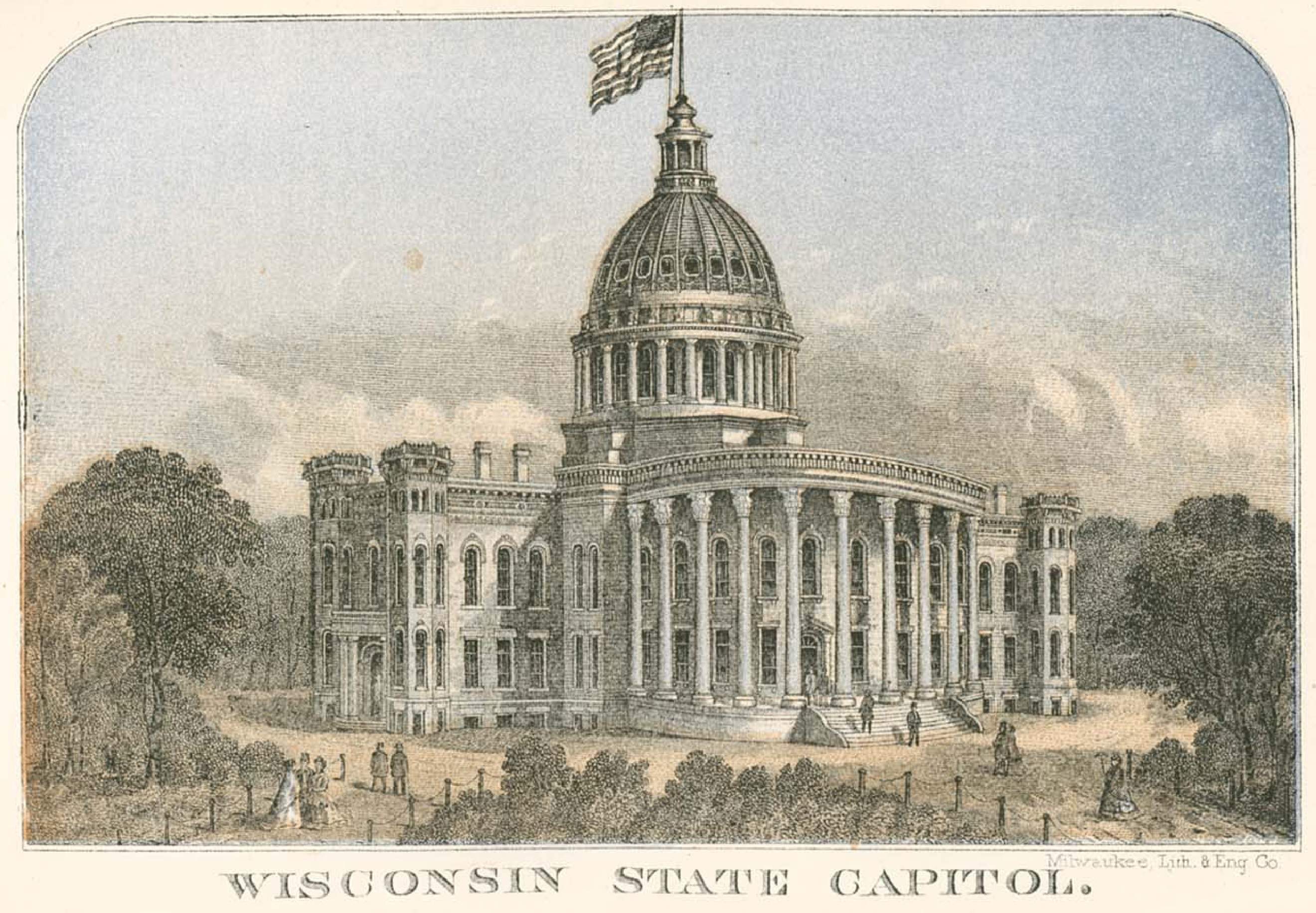
- Wisconsin State Capitol, 1863

Overview
- Legislative body: Wisconsin Legislature
- Meeting place: Wisconsin State Capitol
- Term: January 1, 1877 – January 7, 1878
- Election: November 7, 1876

Senate
- Members: 33
- Senate President: Charles D. Parker (D)
- President pro tempore: William Hiner (R)
- Party control: Republican

Assembly
- Members: 100
- Assembly Speaker: John B. Cassoday (R)
- Party control: Republican

Sessions
- 1st: January 10, 1877 – March 8, 1877

The Thirtieth Wisconsin Legislature convened from January 10, 1877, to March 8, 1877, in regular session.

This was the first legislative session after the redistricting of the Senate and Assembly according to an act of the previous session.

Senators representing odd-numbered districts were newly elected for this session and were serving the first year of a two-year term. Assembly members were elected to a one-year term. Assembly members and odd-numbered senators were elected in the general election of November 7, 1876. Senators representing even-numbered districts were serving the second year of their two-year term, having been elected in the general election held on November 2, 1875.

The governor of Wisconsin during this entire term was Republican Harrison Ludington, of Milwaukee County, serving the second year of a two-year term, having won election in the 1875 Wisconsin gubernatorial election.

== Major events ==
- January 29, 1877: President Ulysses S. Grant signed the Electoral Commission Act to attempt to settle the disputed 1876 United States presidential election.
- March 2, 1877: The Compromise of 1877 secured the election of Rutherford B. Hayes, resolving the disputed 1876 United States presidential election.
- March 4, 1877: Inauguration of Rutherford B. Hayes as the 19th President of the United States.
- May 6, 1877: Chief Crazy Horse of the Oglala Sioux surrendered to United States troops in Nebraska.
- July 16, 1877: The Great Railroad Strike of 1877 lead to rioting in Baltimore, Pittsburgh, and St. Louis.
- September 5, 1877: While in captivity, Chief Crazy Horse was killed by an American soldier.
- November 6, 1877: William E. Smith elected Governor of Wisconsin.
- November 29, 1877: Thomas Edison demonstrated his phonograph for the first time.

== Major legislation ==
- January 31, 1877: Joint Resolution agreeing to an amendment of section four of article seven of the constitution of the state of Wisconsin, 1877 Joint Resolution 1. Confirmed a constitutional amendment adding two seats to the Wisconsin Supreme Court, to be chosen at the Spring 1878 election.
- February 16, 1877: Joint Resolution relating to the coinage of silver, 1877 Act 3.

== Party summary ==
=== Senate summary ===
Senate partisan composition Democratic: 8 seats Liberal Republican: 3 seats Republican: 22 seats

	Party (Shading indicates majority caucus)				Total	
	Dem.	Ref.	Lib.R.	Rep.	Total	Vacant
End of previous Legislature	6	4	2	21	33	0
1st Session	8	0	3	22	33	0
Final voting share	33.33%			66.67%		
Beginning of the next Legislature	10	0	2	21	33	0

=== Assembly summary ===
Assembly partisan composition Democratic: 32 seats Reform: 5 seats Liberal Republican: 1 seat Republican: 62 seats

	Party (Shading indicates majority caucus)							Total	
	Dem.	Ref.	Soc.	Gbk.	Ind.	Lib.R.	Rep.	Total	Vacant
End of previous Legislature	35	11	0	0	1	1	52	100	0
Start of 1st Session	33	5	0	0	0	1	61	100	0
From Jan. 31	32	5	0	0	0	1	62	100	0
Final voting share	38%						62%		
Beginning of the next Legislature	41	0	1	13	0	0	45	100	0

== Sessions ==
- 1st Regular session: January 10, 1877 – March 8, 1877

== Leaders ==
=== Senate leadership ===
- President of the Senate: Charles D. Parker (D)
- President pro tempore: William Hiner (R)

=== Assembly leadership ===
- Speaker of the Assembly: John B. Cassoday

== Members ==
=== Members of the Senate ===
Members of the Senate for the Thirtieth Wisconsin Legislature:

Senate partisan representation Democratic: 8 seats Lib. Rep.: 3 seats Republican: 22 seats

Dist.	Counties	Senator	Residence	Party
01	Door, Kewaunee, Oconto, & Shawano	George Grimmer	Kewaunee	Rep.
02	Brown	Thomas R. Hudd	Green Bay	Dem.
03	Racine	Thomas A. Bones	Racine	Rep.
04	Crawford & Vernon	J. Henry Tate	Viroqua	Rep.
05	Milwaukee (Northern Part)	Isaac W. Van Schaick	Milwaukee	Rep.
06	Milwaukee (Southern Part)	John L. Mitchell	Milwaukee	Dem.
07	Milwaukee (Central Part)	George A. Abert	Milwaukee	Dem.
08	Kenosha & Walworth	Asahel Farr	Kenosha	Rep.
09	Green Lake, Marquette, & Waushara	Hobart S. Sacket	Berlin	Rep.
10	Waukesha	William Blair	Waukesha	Rep.
11	Chippewa, Clark, Lincoln, Taylor, & Wood	Thomas B. Scott	Grand Rapids	Rep.
12	Green & Lafayette	Joseph B. Treat	Monroe	Rep.
13	Dodge	Charles H. Williams	Fox Lake	Dem.
14	Juneau & Sauk	David E. Welch	Baraboo	Rep.
15	Manitowoc	Joseph Rankin	Manitowoc	Dem.
16	Grant	Oscar C. Hathaway	Beetown	Rep.
17	Rock	Hamilton Richardson	Janesville	Rep.
18	Fond du Lac (Western Part)	William Hiner	Fond du Lac	Rep.
19	Winnebago	Return Torrey	Oshkosh	Rep.
20	Sheboygan & Eastern Fond du Lac	Daniel Cavanagh	Osceola	Dem.
21	Marathon, Portage, & Waupaca	Henry Mumbrue	Waupaca	Lib.R.
22	Calumet & Outagamie	James Ryan	Appleton	Dem.
23	Jefferson	William W. Reed	Jefferson	Lib.R.
24	Ashland, Barron, Bayfield, Burnett, Douglas, Polk, & St. Croix	Sam S. Fifield	Ashland	Rep.
25	Dane (Eastern Part)	George B. Burrows	Madison	Rep.
26	Dane (Western Part)	Romanzo E. Davis	Middleton	Lib.R.
27	Adams & Columbia	Levi W. Barden	Portage	Rep.
28	Iowa & Richland	Daniel Downs	Richland Center	Rep.
29	Buffalo, Pepin, & Trempealeau	Alexander A. Arnold	Galesville	Rep.
30	Dunn, Eau Claire, & Pierce	Rockwell J. Flint	Menomonie	Rep.
31	La Crosse	Merrick Wing	La Crosse	Rep.
32	Jackson & Monroe	Mark Douglas	Melrose	Rep.
33	Ozaukee & Washington	Philip Schneider	Farmington	Dem.

=== Members of the Assembly ===
Members of the Assembly for the Thirtieth Wisconsin Legislature:

Assembly partisan composition Democratic: 32 seats Reform: 5 seats Liberal Republican: 1 seat Republican: 62 seats

Senate District	County	Dist.	Representative	Party	Residence
27	Adams		Solon Pierce	Rep.	Friendship
24	Ashland, Barron, Bayfield, Burnett, Douglas, & Polk		Woodbury S. Grover	Rep.	Prairie Farm
02	Brown	1	David M. Kelly	Rep.	Green Bay
02	Brown	2	William J. Fisk	Rep.	Fort Howard
02	Brown	3	Michael J. Touhey	Dem.	Morrison
29	Buffalo & Pepin	1	John J. Senn	Rep.	Fountain City
29	Buffalo & Pepin	2	Vivus W. Dorwin	Rep.	Durand
22	Calumet		Benjamin F. Carter	Dem.	Harrison
11	Chippewa		Louis Vincent	Dem.	Chippewa Falls
11	Clark, Lincoln, Taylor & Wood		Freeman Lindsay	Rep.	Neillsville
27	Columbia	1	David Owen	Rep.	Caledonia
27	Columbia	2	Harmon J. Fisk	Rep.	Columbus
04	Crawford		Samuel Wannemaker	Dem.	Marietta
26	Dane	1	Michael Johnson	Ref.	Springdale
25	Dane	2	Phineas Baldwin	Rep.	Oregon
25	Dane	3	George Weeks	Rep.	York
13	Dodge	1	William Zeiman	Dem.	Horicon
13	Dodge	2	Francis Newhauser	Dem.	Lomira
13	Dodge	3	Leander H. Shepard	Rep.	Burnett
13	Dodge	4	Patrick Roche	Dem.	Elba
01	Door		Jarvis T. Wright	Dem.	Sturgeon Bay
30	Dunn		Samuel Black	Rep.	Menomonie
30	Eau Claire		Thomas Carmichael	Dem.	Eau Claire
18	Fond du Lac	1	William T. Innis	Rep.	West Rosendale
18	Fond du Lac	2	Wolcott T. Brooks	Rep.	Waupun
18	Fond du Lac	3	Thomas W. Spence	Rep.	Fond du Lac
20	Fond du Lac	4	Lambert Brost	Dem.	Calumet
16	Grant	1	William E. Carter	Rep.	Platteville
16	Grant	2	Joseph Bock	Rep.	Lancaster
16	Grant	3	Daniel R. Sylvester	Rep.	Castle Rock
12	Green	1	John Luchsinger	Rep.	New Glarus
12	Green	2	Franklin Mitchell	Rep.	Spring Grove
09	Green Lake		Homer Nelson	Rep.	Markesan
28	Iowa	1	Robert Kinzie	Dem.	Avoca
28	Iowa	2	John Gray	Rep.	Mineral Point
32	Jackson		Carl C. Pope	Rep.	Black River Falls
23	Jefferson	1	Hezekiah Flinn	Dem.	Watertown
23	Jefferson	2	Charles H. Phillips	Rep.	Lake Mills
23	Jefferson	3	Adolf Scheuber	Dem.	Erfurt
14	Juneau	1	David Truell	Rep.	Lyndon
14	Juneau	2	William H. H. Cash	Rep.	New Lisbon
08	Kenosha		Walter Maxwell	Rep.	Somers
01	Kewaunee		Charles Tisch	Dem.	Carlton
31	La Crosse		William Van Waters	Dem.	Hamilton
11	Lafayette	1	Andrew J. Anderson	Rep.	Argyle
11	Lafayette	2	James Earnest	Dem.	Shullsburg
15	Manitowoc	1	Thomas Thornton	Dem.	Cato
15	Manitowoc	2	Thomas Mohr	Ref.	Kossuth
15	Manitowoc	3	Peter Johnston	Rep.	Manitowoc
21	Marathon		Bartholomew Ringle	Dem.	Wausau
09	Marquette		Samuel Crockett	Dem.	Westfield
05	Milwaukee	1	James G. Flanders	Dem.	Milwaukee
07	Milwaukee	2	Joseph Hamilton	Dem.	Milwaukee
07	Milwaukee	3	Edward Keogh	Dem.	Milwaukee
07	Milwaukee	4	Edwin Hyde	Rep.	Milwaukee
06	Milwaukee	5	David Vance	Rep.	Milwaukee
05	Milwaukee	6	Florian J. Ries	Rep.	Milwaukee
07	Milwaukee	7	David P. Hull	Rep.	Milwaukee
06	Milwaukee	8	Peter Salentine (Until Jan. 31)	Dem.	Milwaukee
06	Milwaukee	8	Henry Fink (From Jan. 31)	Rep.	Milwaukee
05	Milwaukee	9	Christian Sarnow	Rep.	Milwaukee
05	Milwaukee	10	Richard F. Stapleton	Dem.	Granville
06	Milwaukee	11	Aloysius Arnolds	Dem.	New Coeln
32	Monroe	1	Chauncey Blakeslee	Dem.	Sparta
32	Monroe	2	Harry Doxtader	Rep.	Tomah
01	Oconto & Shawano		John D. Kast	Rep.	Shawano
22	Outagamie	1	David Hammel	Dem.	Appleton
22	Outagamie	2	John J. Knowlton	Dem.	Seymour
33	Ozaukee		Gustav Gotze	Ref.	Port Washington
30	Pierce		Ellsworth Burnett	Rep.	River Falls
21	Portage		William Arnott	Rep.	Stockton
03	Racine	1	Norton J. Field	Rep.	Racine
03	Racine	2	John T. Rice	Rep.	Waterford
28	Richland	1	J. L. R. McCollum	Dem.	Sextonville
28	Richland	2	Elihu Bailey	Rep.	Marshall
17	Rock	1	Sereno Merrill	Rep.	Beloit
17	Rock	2	John B. Cassoday	Rep.	Janesville
17	Rock	3	Gideon E. Newman	Rep.	Cooksville
14	Sauk	1	David B. Hulburt	Rep.	Loganville
14	Sauk	2	Silas J. Seymour	Rep.	Dellona
20	Sheboygan	1	Joseph Wedig	Ref.	Sheboygan
20	Sheboygan	2	Samuel D. Hubbard	Lib.R.	Lyndon
20	Sheboygan	3	Ambrose D. DeLand	Rep.	Lima
24	St. Croix		Guy Dailey	Ref.	Hudson
29	Trempealeau		James L. Linderman	Rep.	Osseo
04	Vernon	1	Peter J. Dale	Rep.	Coon Prairie
04	Vernon	2	Henry H. Wyatt	Rep.	Stark
08	Walworth	1	Alfred H. Abell	Rep.	Bloomfield
08	Walworth	2	Wilson R. Herron	Rep.	Sharon
08	Walworth	3	William Greening	Rep.	La Grange
33	Washington	1	Frank Fitzgerald	Dem.	Hartford
33	Washington	2	Nicholaus Marx	Dem.	Farmington
10	Waukesha	1	Hercules F. Dousman	Rep.	Waterville
10	Waukesha	2	Thomas McCarty	Dem.	Menomonee Falls
21	Waupaca	1	Asa L. Baldwin	Rep.	Baldwin's Mills
21	Waupaca	2	Hannibal Dixon	Rep.	New London
09	Waushara		Jabez K. Walker	Rep.	East Oasis
19	Winnebago	1	Thomas Wall	Dem.	Oshkosh
19	Winnebago	2	Henry Leavens	Rep.	Neenah
19	Winnebago	3	Levi E. Knapp	Rep.	Oshkosh
19	Winnebago	4	Sidney Shufelt	Rep.	Poygan

== Changes from the 29th Legislature ==
New districts for the 30th Legislature were defined in 1876 Wisconsin Act 343, passed into law in the 29th Wisconsin Legislature.

=== Senate redistricting ===
==== Summary of changes ====
- 10 Senate districts were left unchanged (or were only renumbered).
- Brown County became its own senate district (2), after previously having been in a shared district with Door and Kewaunee counties.
- The Dane County district boundaries were slightly redrawn and renumbered (25, 26).
- Milwaukee County went from having 2 districts to 3 (5, 6, 7).
- Green and Lafayette counties were combined into one district (12).
- Fond du Lac County's eastern district was combined with Manitowoc County as one district (20).
- Pierce County was removed from the 24th district and added to a new district with Eau Claire and Dunn counties (30).

==== Senate districts ====
after redistricting

before redistricting

Dist.	29th Legislature	30th Legislature
1	Sheboygan County	Door, Kewaunee, Oconto, Shawano counties
2	Brown, Door, Kewaunee counties	Brown County
3	Ozaukee County	Racine County
4	Monroe, Vernon counties	Crawford, Vernon counties
5	Racine County	Northern Milwaukee County
6	Southern Milwaukee County	Southern Milwaukee County
7	Eastern Dane County	Central Milwaukee County
8	Kenosha, Walworth counties	Kenosha, Walworth counties
9	Iowa County	Green Lake, Marquette, Waushara counties
10	Waukesha County	Waukesha County
11	Lafayette County	Chippewa, Clark, Lincoln, Taylor, Wood counties
12	Green County	Green, Lafayette counties
13	Dodge County	Dodge County
14	Sauk County	Juneau, Sauk counties
15	Manitowoc County	Manitowoc County
16	Grant County	Grant County
17	Rock County	Rock County
18	Western Fond du Lac County	Western Fond du Lac County
19	Manitowoc County	Winnebago County
20	Eastern Fond du Lac County	Sheboygan, Eastern Fond du Lac counties
21	Marathon, Oconto, Shawano, Waupaca, Northern Outagamie counties	Marathon, Portage, Waupaca counties
22	Calumet, Southern Outagamie counties	Calumet, Outagamie counties
23	Jefferson County	Jefferson County
24	Ashland, Barron, Bayfield, Burnett, Douglas, Pierce, Polk, St. Croix counties	Ashland, Barron, Bayfield, Burnett, Douglas, Polk, St. Croix counties
25	Green Lake, Marquette, Waushara counties	Eastern Dane County
26	Western Dane County	Western Dane County
27	Columbia County	Adams, Columbia counties
28	Crawford, Richland counties	Iowa, Richland counties
29	Adams, Juneau, Portage, Wood counties	Buffalo, Pepin, Trempealeau counties
30	Chippewa, Dunn, Eau Claire, Pepin counties	Dunn, Eau Claire, Pierce counties
31	La Crosse County	La Crosse County
32	Buffalo, Clark, Jackson, Trempealeau counties	Jackson & Monroe counties
33	Ozaukee, Washington counties	Ozaukee, Washington counties

=== Assembly redistricting ===
==== Summary of changes ====
- 45 Assembly districts were left unchanged (or were only renumbered).
- Adams County became its own Assembly district, after previously having been in a shared district with Wood County.
- Chippewa County became its own Assembly district, after previously having been in a shared district with Taylor County.
- Columbia County went from having 3 districts to 2.
- Dane County went from having 4 districts to 3.
- Dodge County went from having 6 districts to 4.
- Door County became its own Assembly district, after previously having been in a shared district with Northern Kewaunee County.
- Dunn County became its own Assembly district, after previously having been in a shared district with Pepin County.
- Juneau County went from having 1 district to 2.
- Ozaukee County went from having 2 districts to 1.
- Rock County went from having 5 districts to 3.

==== Assembly districts ====
after redistricting

before redistricting

County	Districts in 29th Legislature	Districts in 30th Legislature	Change
Adams	Shared with Wood	1 District	▲
Ashland	Shared with Barron, Bayfield, Burnett, Douglas, Polk	Shared with Barron, Bayfield, Burnett, Douglas, Polk	Steady
Barron	Shared with Ashland, Bayfield, Burnett, Douglas, Polk	Shared with Ashland, Bayfield, Burnett, Douglas, Polk	Steady
Bayfield	Shared with Ashland, Barron, Burnett, Douglas, Polk	Shared with Ashland, Barron, Burnett, Douglas, Polk	Steady
Brown	3 Districts	3 Districts	Steady
Buffalo	1 District	2 shared with Pepin	▲
Burnett	Shared with Ashland, Barron, Bayfield, Douglas, Polk	Shared with Ashland, Barron, Bayfield, Douglas, Polk	Steady
Calumet	1 District	1 District	Steady
Chippewa	Shared with Taylor	1 District	▲
Clark	Shared with Jackson	Shared with Lincoln, Taylor & Wood	Steady
Columbia	3 Districts	2 Districts	▼
Crawford	1 District	1 District	Steady
Dane	4 Districts	3 Districts	▼
Dodge	6 Districts	4 Districts	▼
Door	Shared with Northern Kewaunee	1 District	▲
Douglas	Shared with Ashland, Barron, Bayfield, Burnett, Polk	Shared with Ashland, Barron, Bayfield, Burnett, Polk	Steady
Dunn	Shared with Pepin	1 District	▲
Eau Claire	1 District	1 District	Steady
Fond du Lac	3 Districts	4 Districts	▲
Grant	4 Districts	3 Districts	▼
Green	1 District	2 Districts	▲
Green Lake	1 District	1 District	Steady
Iowa	2 Districts	2 Districts	Steady
Jackson	Shared with Clark	1 District	▲
Jefferson	3 Districts	3 Districts	Steady
Juneau	1 District	2 Districts	▲
Kenosha	1 District	1 District	Steady
Kewaunee	Divided between Door and Brown	1 District	▲
La Crosse	1 District	1 District	Steady
Lafayette	1 District	2 Districts	▲
Manitowoc	3 Districts	3 Districts	Steady
Marathon	1 District	1 District	Steady
Marquette	1 District	1 District	Steady
Milwaukee	11 Districts	11 Districts	Steady
Monroe	2 Districts	2 Districts	Steady
Oconto	1 District	Shared with Shawano	▼
Outagamie	Divided between Shawano and own district	2 Districts	▲
Ozaukee	2 Districts	1 District	▼
Pepin	Shared with Dunn	2 shared with Buffalo	Steady
Pierce	1 District	1 District	Steady
Polk	Shared with Ashland, Barron, Bayfield, Burnett, Douglas	Shared with Ashland, Barron, Bayfield, Burnett, Douglas	Steady
Portage	1 District	1 District	Steady
Racine	2 Districts	2 Districts	Steady
Richland	2 Districts	2 Districts	Steady
Rock	5 Districts	3 Districts	▼
Sauk	2 Districts	2 Districts	Steady
Shawano	Shared with Northern Outagamie & Eastern Waupaca	Shared with Oconto	Steady
Sheboygan	3 Districts	3 Districts	Steady
St. Croix	1 District	1 District	Steady
Taylor	Shared with Chippewa	Shared with Clark, Lincoln, Wood	Steady
Trempealeau	1 District	1 District	Steady
Vernon	2 Districts	2 Districts	Steady
Walworth	3 Districts	3 Districts	Steady
Washington	2 Districts	2 Districts	Steady
Waukesha	2 Districts	2 Districts	Steady
Waupaca	Shared with Shawano & Northern Outagamie	2 Districts	▲
Waushara	1 District	1 District	Steady
Winnebago	4 Districts	4 Districts	Steady
Wood	Shared with Adams	Shared with Clark, Lincoln, & Taylor	Steady
