= Charles Hadley Hamilton =

American politician (1850–1915)

Charles H. Hamilton
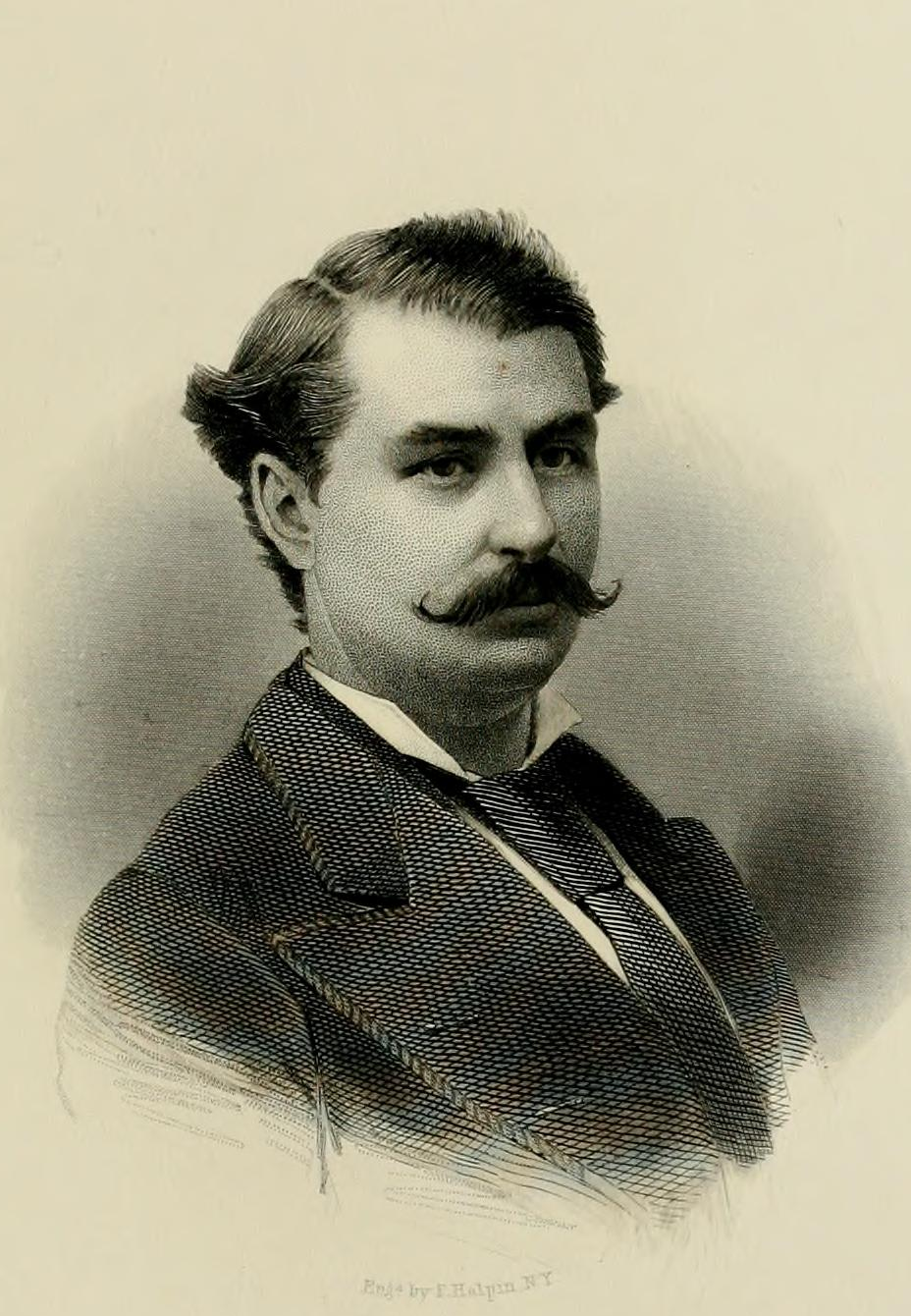

City Attorney of Milwaukee
- In office April 20, 1894 – May 3, 1897
- Preceded by: Conrad Krez
- Succeeded by: Howard Van Wyck

Member of the Wisconsin State Assembly from the Milwaukee 7th district
- In office January 7, 1878 – January 6, 1879
- Preceded by: David P. Hull
- Succeeded by: Anson Allen

Personal details
- Born: August 5, 1850 Rochester, New York, U.S.
- Died: March 22, 1915 (aged 64) Milwaukee, Wisconsin, U.S.
- Resting place: Forest Home Cemetery, Milwaukee, Wisconsin
- Spouse: Caroline Austin Nichols (m. 1873; died 1897)
- Children: 4
- Parent: Charles Smith Hamilton (father)
- Education: University of Michigan

Charles Hadley Hamilton (August 5, 1850 – March 22, 1915) was an American lawyer, businessman, and Republican politician. He served as city attorney of Milwaukee, Wisconsin, and represented downtown Milwaukee for one term in the Wisconsin State Assembly. He was the son of Union Army general Charles Smith Hamilton.

== Biography ==
Hamilton's grave (rear, third from left) at Forest Home Cemetery

Charles Hadley Hamilton was born in Rochester, New York, in 1850. When he was 2, his father moved the family to Fond du Lac, Wisconsin, where he was educated through the public schools. After high school, he joined a U.S. survey of Lake Superior and entered the University of Michigan in 1868, graduating as a mining engineer in 1869.

That year, he moved to Milwaukee, Wisconsin, and was employed as a deputy U.S. marshal—his father was then U.S. marshal for the Eastern District of Wisconsin. While employed as deputy marshal, he studied law and was admitted to the Milwaukee bar in 1872. Rather than practicing law, he went into business, becoming a junior partner at the paper company of Sylus Van Buren and Co. Shortly thereafter, at age 24, he was sole owner of the company.

Hamilton was active with the Republican Party of Wisconsin, and worked on the re-election campaign of President Ulysses S. Grant in 1872. He was subsequently elected to the Wisconsin State Assembly for the 1878 session, representing Milwaukee's 7th ward.

After his Assembly term, he focused on his business interests and was an incorporator of the Menominee Chemical Company in 1883, to manufacture drug supplies. He was also a founder of the Green Bay Land Company to purchase pine land for extraction.

In April 1894, he was elected city attorney of Milwaukee. The incumbent, Conrad Krez, however, refused to give up the office, citing an 1889 act of the Wisconsin Legislature which extended the city attorney's term to four years. Hamilton sued and won his case, enabling him to take office on April 20. Krez appealed to the Wisconsin Supreme Court, which upheld the circuit court decision. Hamilton ultimately only served three years of his term, resigning in May 1897 to receive an appointment as special assistant city attorney, a position created by a new law. The change allowed him to remain in office for another three years at only a slightly reduced salary.

He was a hereditary companion of the Wisconsin Commandery of the Military Order of the Loyal Legion of the United States by right of his father's service in the Union Army during the American Civil War.

Hamilton died at Milwaukee in March 1915, and was buried at Forest Home Cemetery.

Wisconsin State Assembly
Preceded by David P. Hull	Member of the Wisconsin State Assembly from the Milwaukee 7th district January 7, 1878 – January 6, 1879	Succeeded by Anson Allen
