= Robert Kinzie =

Robert Kinzie may refer to:

- Robert Kinzie (politician) (1840–1936), member of the Wisconsin State Assembly
- Robert A. Kinzie III (died 2022), professor of biology and zoology
