= Joseph Frost =

Joseph Frost or Joe Frost may refer to:

- Joe Frost, American musician, member of former deathcore band From the Shallows (2005–2009)
- Joe Frost, director of forthcoming film version of the 2012 novel The Panopticon
- Joe Frost (actor), British actor who plays Leo Thompkins in the TV soap Coronation Street
- Joe Frost (artist), Australian artist linked to the Watters Gallery in Sydney
- Joe Frost (film editor), British editor of many films, including Vietnam: The Last Battle, John Pilger's 1995 documentary
- Joseph Frost (fl. mid-19th C) of the Muggletonians, a Protestant Christian movement in Britain
- Joseph Frost (boxer) (born 1960), British boxer
- Joseph A. Frost (1837–?), American politician in the Wisconsin State Assembly
- Joseph H. Frost (1805–1866), American Methodist Episcopalian missionary

== See also ==
- Jo Frost (born 1971), 'Supernanny'
