= John Grimshaw =

John Grimshaw may refer to:

- John Grimshaw (soldier) (1893–1980), English recipient of the Victoria Cross
- John Grimshaw (politician) (1842–1917), American businessman and politician
- John Grimshaw (cyclist) (born 1945), voice for cyclists in the UK
- John Atkinson Grimshaw (1836–1893), English artist
