= Thomas Wilson Spence =

American politician (1846–1912)

Thomas W. Spence

Member of the Wisconsin State Assembly from the Fond du Lac 3rd district
- In office January 6, 1879 – January 5, 1880
- Preceded by: James Fitzgerald
- Succeeded by: John F. Ware
- In office January 1, 1877 – January 7, 1878
- Preceded by: Lambert Brost
- Succeeded by: James Fitzgerald

Personal details
- Born: September 2, 1846 Dungannon, County Tyrone, Ireland, UK
- Died: February 23, 1912 (aged 65) Wisconsin State Capitol, Madison, Wisconsin, U.S.
- Cause of death: Heart attack
- Resting place: Rienzi Cemetery, Fond du Lac, Wisconsin
- Party: Republican
- Spouse: Maria Cornelia Tallmadge (m. 1874–1912)
- Children: Thomas Henry Spence; (1875–1955)
- Education: Cornell University
- Profession: Lawyer
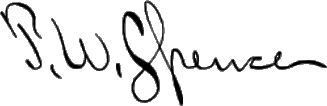
- Signature

Thomas Wilson Spence (September 2, 1846 – February 23, 1912) was an Irish American immigrant, lawyer, and politician. He was a member of the Wisconsin State Assembly, representing the city of Fond du Lac during the 1877 and 1879 sessions. As a young man, he was one of the "Ohio Five", who were among the early students of Cornell University. Spence rose to legal prominence in Milwaukee, and died of a heart attack in the chambers of the Wisconsin Supreme Court while making oral arguments. "He died with his tie on."

== Early life ==
Thomas Wilson Spence was born in Dungannon, County Tyrone, Ireland, in September 1846. He emigrated with his family to the United States in the midst of Án Gorta Mór or the Great Famine of 1845–1848. His family located at Chillicothe, Ohio, where he was raised and educated. After completing his common school education, his family relocated to Fond du Lac, Wisconsin, in 1865. Spence quickly returned to Ohio, however, and attended Ohio Wesleyan University. After a year, in 1867, he entered Cornell University. He studied the classical course and graduated as valedictorian in 1870.

While at Ohio Wesleyan, Spence joined the Phi Kappa Psi fraternity and transferred to Cornell with several fraternity brothers. At Cornell, he was "the fourth founder" of the New York Alpha chapter of Phi Kappa Psi. He was also a founding member of Cornell's Irving Literary Society.

== Fond du Lac career ==
After graduating, Spence returned to Fond du Lac and began to study law in the office of Coleman & Thorpe. He was admitted to the bar in 1872 and began practicing law in Fond du Lac. In 1875, he formed a partnership with his former teacher, James Coleman, creating a firm known as Coleman & Spence. Coleman had also been postmaster at Fond du Lac, and Spence was appointed the new postmaster in 1879. That partnership continued until 1880, when Coleman moved to Washington, D.C., to become a partner for U.S. senator Matthew H. Carpenter. Spence formed a new partnership with a recent pupil, Joseph W. Hiner, in a firm known as Spence & Hiner.

While prospering in his legal career, Spence also became active in politics as a member of the Republican Party. He was elected to two terms in the Wisconsin State Assembly, serving in the 1877 and 1879 sessions. He represented Fond du Lac County's 3rd Assembly district, which then comprised just the city of Fond du Lac. He also presided as chairman of the Republican State Convention in 1884.

== Quarles, Spence & Quarles ==
In 1884, Spence left Fond du Lac and moved to Racine, Wisconsin, to partner with Joseph V. Quarles, whose previous partner, John B. Winslow, had just been elected Wisconsin circuit court judge. In 1888, they moved to Milwaukee to expand their practice, and admitted Joseph's brother, Charles Quarles, as a third partner. The firm was then known as Quarles, Spence & Quarles and became one of the leading law firms in Wisconsin.

The firm of Quarles, Spence & Quarles still survives, in some respects, in the 21st century. Borgelt, Powell, Peterson & Frauen S.C. traces its origins to the 1881 firm of Quarles & Winslow, the predecessor of Quarles, Spence & Quarles. The name of the firm remained Quarles, Spence & Quarles until 1957.

== Death ==
Mr. Spence's sudden death occurred in the Wisconsin Supreme Court chambers at Madison. He was one of the attorneys in a case which was being argued and he was sitting at the attorneys' table. He suddenly fell across the table and when attendants reached his side he was dead. Although he had been one of the most active and best known lawyers in Wisconsin, he had not mixed in politics since the days when he practiced in Fond du Lac. Although pressed many times to be a candidate for office he had always refused.

Two years after counselor Spence's death, it was written in the History of Wisconsin:

... the important law firm of Quarles, Spence & Quarles, with offices in the Sentinel Building at Milwaukee. The interested principals in this firm are all able representatives of the second generation of their respective families in the legal profession in Wisconsin, since each of the members is a son of a distinguished Wisconsin lawyer, the fathers of the present members having likewise been associated in their practice. William C. and Joseph V. Quarles, Jr., are sons of the late Judge Joseph V. Quarles, who was one of the leading members of the Wisconsin bar and who served with distinction as United States Senator and United States District Judge. Thomas H. Spence, the other member of the firm, is a son of the late Thomas W. Spence, whose name is one of marked prominence in connection with the history of Wisconsin jurisprudence.

== Personal life and family ==
Thomas Spence married Maria Cornelia Tallmadge, of Granville, Wisconsin, in 1874. Cornelia was the sixth child of Montgomery Tallmadge and his wife Nancy Ann (née Eastman). The Tallmadge family was descended from Thomas Talmadge, an English immigrant who came to the Massachusetts Bay Colony in 1631. The Talmadge family contained many prominent figures in American history, including Cornelia's great grandfather Benjamin Tallmadge, who was a significant spymaster for George Washington during the American Revolutionary War. Nathaniel P. Tallmadge, who served as governor of the Wisconsin Territory, was a second cousin (twice-removed).

Thomas and Cornelia had one child, Thomas Henry Spence, who graduated from Yale in 1899 and became a partner in his father's law firm.

== Electoral history ==
=== Wisconsin Assembly (1876) ===
Wisconsin Assembly, Fond du Lac 3rd District Election, 1876
Party	Candidate	Votes	%	±%
General Election, November 7, 1876
Republican	Thomas W. Spence	1,469	50.52%	
Democratic	S. S. Bowers	1,439	49.48%	
Plurality		30	1.03%	-49.23%
Total votes		2,908	100.0%	+38.28%
Republican gain from Democratic				

=== Wisconsin Assembly (1878) ===
Wisconsin Assembly, Fond du Lac 3rd District Election, 1878
Party	Candidate	Votes	%	±%
General Election, November 5, 1878
Republican	Thomas W. Spence	1,055	48.68%	+0.23%
Democratic	John Bunnell	605	27.92%	
Greenback	James Fitzgerald (incumbent)	507	23.40%	−28.15%
Plurality		450	20.77%	+17.67%
Total votes		2,167	100.0%	-2.87%
Republican gain from Greenback				

Wisconsin State Assembly
Preceded by Lambert Brost	Member of the Wisconsin State Assembly from the Fond du Lac 3rd district January 1, 1877 – January 7, 1878	Succeeded by James Fitzgerald
Preceded by James Fitzgerald	Member of the Wisconsin State Assembly from the Fond du Lac 3rd district January 6, 1879 – January 5, 1880	Succeeded by John F. Ware
