= Brost =

The surname Brost derives from the Middle High German brobest, meaning supervisor. Notable people with the surname include:

- Erich Brost (1903–1995), German journalist and publisher
- Gudrun Brost (1910–1993), Swedish actress
- Johannes Brost (1946–2018), Swedish actor
- Lambert Brost (1835–1909), American member of the Wisconsin State Assembly
- Ray Henderson (1896–1970), American songwriter (born Raymond Brost)
- Todd Brost (born 1967), Canadian ice hockey player and coach
