= Charles Smith Hamilton =

Union Army general in the American Civil War

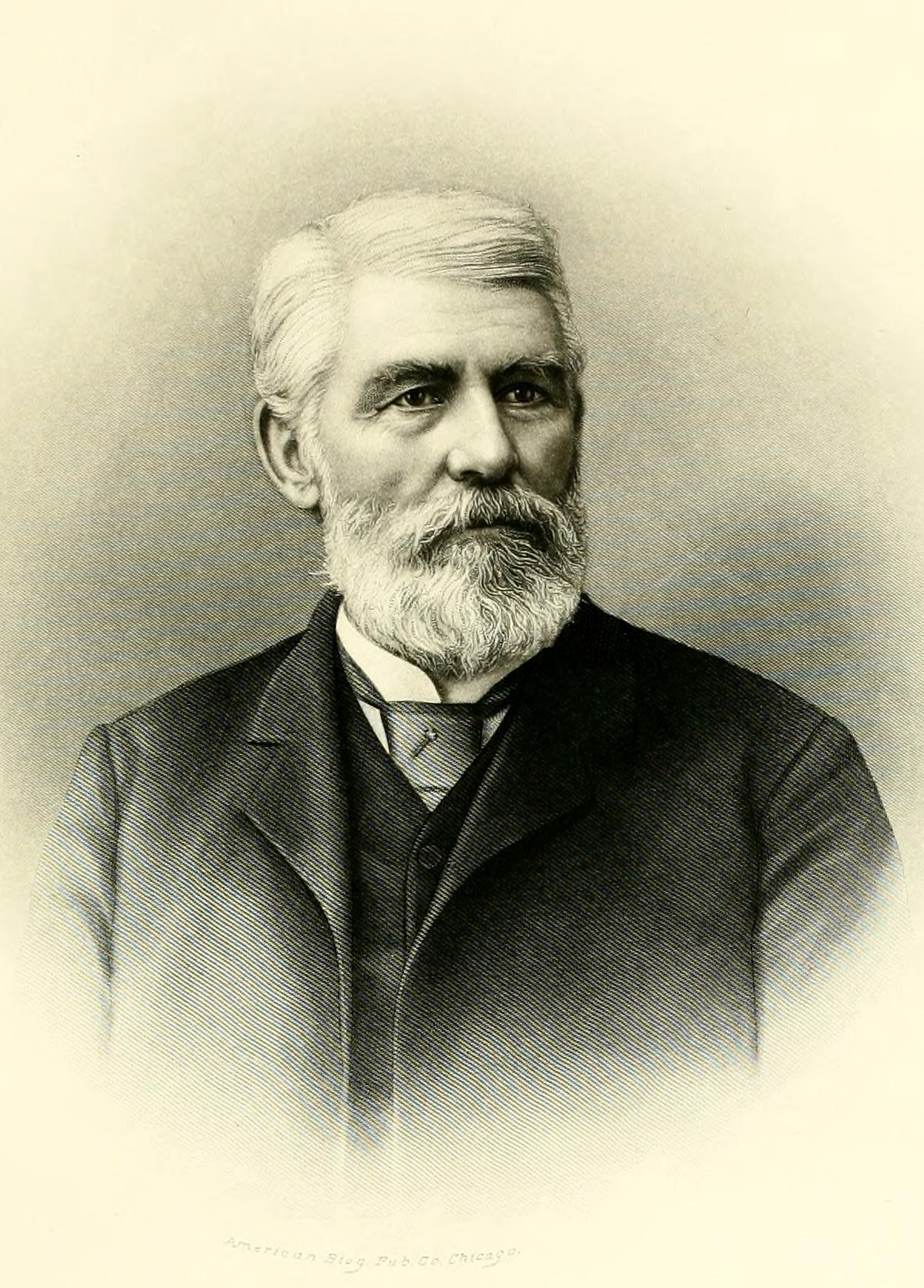
- From History of Milwaukee from its first settlement to the year 1895 (1895)

United States Marshal for the Eastern District of Wisconsin
- In office April 1, 1869 – March 17, 1877
- President: Ulysses S. Grant
- Preceded by: Cassius Fairchild (whole state)
- Succeeded by: Henry Fink

Personal details
- Born: November 16, 1822 Westernville, New York, U.S.
- Died: April 17, 1891 (aged 68) Milwaukee, Wisconsin, U.S.
- Resting place: Forest Home Cemetery, Milwaukee, Wisconsin
- Spouse: Sophia J. Shepard (died 1911)
- Children: Charles Hadley Hamilton^{(b. 1850; died 1915)}; William Reeve Hamilton^{(b. 1855; died 1914)}; Arthur Putnam Hamilton^{(b. 1859; died 1910)}; Harry F. Hamilton^{(b. 1859; died 1911)}
- Education: United States Military Academy
- Occupation: soldier, manufacturer

Military service
- Allegiance: United States; Union
- Branch/service: United States Army; Union Army
- Years of service: 1843–1853; 1861–1863
- Rank: Major General
- Commands: 3rd Reg. Wis. Vol. Infantry
- Battles/wars: Mexican–American War; Battle of Monterrey; Siege of Veracruz; Battle of Cerro Gordo; Battle of Contreras; Battle of Churubusco; Battle of Molino del Rey; Comanche Wars; American Civil War; Battle of Yorktown; Battle of Iuka; Second Battle of Corinth

Charles Smith Hamilton (November 16, 1822 – April 17, 1891) was a career United States Army officer who served with distinction during the Mexican–American War. He also served as a Union Army general during the early part of the American Civil War. After the war, he was appointed U.S. marshal for the Eastern District of Wisconsin by President Ulysses S. Grant, and served as president of the University of Wisconsin Board of Regents.

== Early life ==
Charles Smith Hamilton was born in Westernville, New York, and was raised in western New York. He entered the United States Military Academy in 1839 and graduated in 1843, standing 26th out of 39 cadets; he was a classmate of Ulysses S. Grant, Christopher C. Augur, Joseph J. Reynolds, and several other men who would go on to become generals in the Army.

== First military service ==
Upon his graduation, he was assigned to the 2nd U.S. Infantry Regiment as brevet second lieutenant. He was officially promoted to second lieutenant on November 17, 1845, and was assigned to the 5th U.S. Infantry, serving in the Army of General Zachary Taylor in the early phases of the Mexican–American War.

Hamilton and his regiment took part in the Battle of Monterrey, and received compliments from his superior officers in their report of the battle. He was then active in the Siege of Veracruz and the Battle of Cerro Gordo, and was promoted to first lieutenant on June 30, 1847. He distinguished himself again at the battles of Contreras and Churubusco, and was given an honorary brevet to captain. But he was severely wounded at the Battle of Molino del Rey. He was shot through the shoulder and remained in the hospital six months recuperating.

After recovering from his wound, Hamilton was assigned to the recruiting service at Rochester, New York, for two years. He returned to battle in 1850, commanding companies in Texas and Mississippi in campaigns of the Comanche Wars.

He resigned from the Army on April 30, 1853, and moved his family to Fond du Lac, Wisconsin. There he settled a farm and established a linseed oil mill.

== Civil War service ==
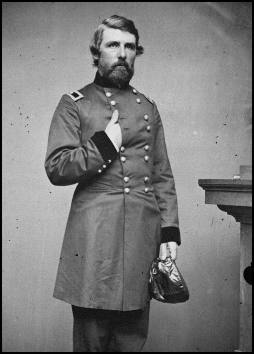
Photo taken between 1861 and 1862

At the outbreak of the American Civil War, few men in the state of Wisconsin had any formal military experience. A friend of Governor Alexander Randall showed him a record of Captain Hamilton's service in the Mexican War, and informed the governor that Hamilton was residing at Fond du Lac. Governor Randall immediately summoned Hamilton to Madison, Wisconsin, to assist in organizing Wisconsin's volunteer regiments.

Hamilton was eager to return to active service and accepted commission as colonel of the 3rd Wisconsin Infantry Regiment on May 11, 1861, just a month after the attack on Fort Sumter. Hamilton drilled and equipped his regiment and set off to Harpers Ferry to report to Nathaniel P. Banks in July 1861. Immediately after arriving in the field, Hamilton was promoted to brigadier general and placed in command of a brigade in Banks' division of the Army of the Potomac.

In the Fall and Winter of 1861, Hamilton's brigade was engaged in securing the Union defensive line along the Potomac River in western Maryland and Northern Virginia. After the Union defeat at Ball's Bluff, Hamilton was tasked to survey crossing points along the river. In March 1862, Hamilton's brigade was sent to engage in reconnaissance-in-force to Stonewall Jackson's camp at Winchester, Virginia. He successfully occupied the city on March 13, but found that Jackson and his corps had escaped the day before. That same day, General George B. McClellan ordered Hamilton to take command of the 3rd division of III Corps for his planned Peninsula Campaign.

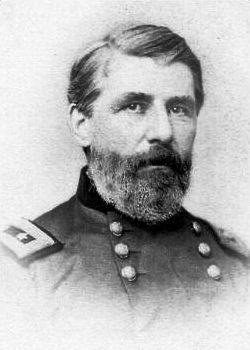
Hamilton in his major general's uniform

He led this division during the Siege of Yorktown, but drew the ire of George B. McClellan for insubordination. Ignoring the fact that shelving Hamilton would create powerful political enemies, McClellan relieved Hamilton on April 30, 1862, without explanation. When Lincoln pointed out the impropriety of McClellan's action, McClellan claimed "You cannot do anything better calculated to injure my army ... than to restore Gen. Hamilton to his division." Before the month-long siege preparations were complete, Hamilton was transferred to the Western Theater where he commanded the 3rd Division in the Army of the Mississippi at the battles of Iuka and Corinth. Following Corinth in October 1862, he was promoted to major general, effective from September 19, 1862.

During his brief military service in the conflict, Hamilton served in both the eastern and western theaters. He commanded divisions, "wings" and corps of the Army of the Potomac, the Army of the Mississippi, as well as in the Army of the Tennessee.

During the months of January and February 1863 Hamilton was in simultaneous command of the Dist. of West Tennessee, Dist. of Corinth, the Left Wing of XVI Corps, and XVI Corps. While in command at Corinth, he began intriguing for higher command against Generals Hurlbut and James B. McPherson, which drew Grant's ire. When Grant ordered him to Vicksburg to serve under General John Alexander McClernand, Hamilton offered his resignation from the U.S. Army on April 13, 1863. Grant gladly accepted the resignation, forwarding several pages of documentation to Washington to support his case.

After the war, Hamilton was elected as a Veteran Companion of the Wisconsin Commandery of the Military Order of the Loyal Legion of the United States.

== Later years ==
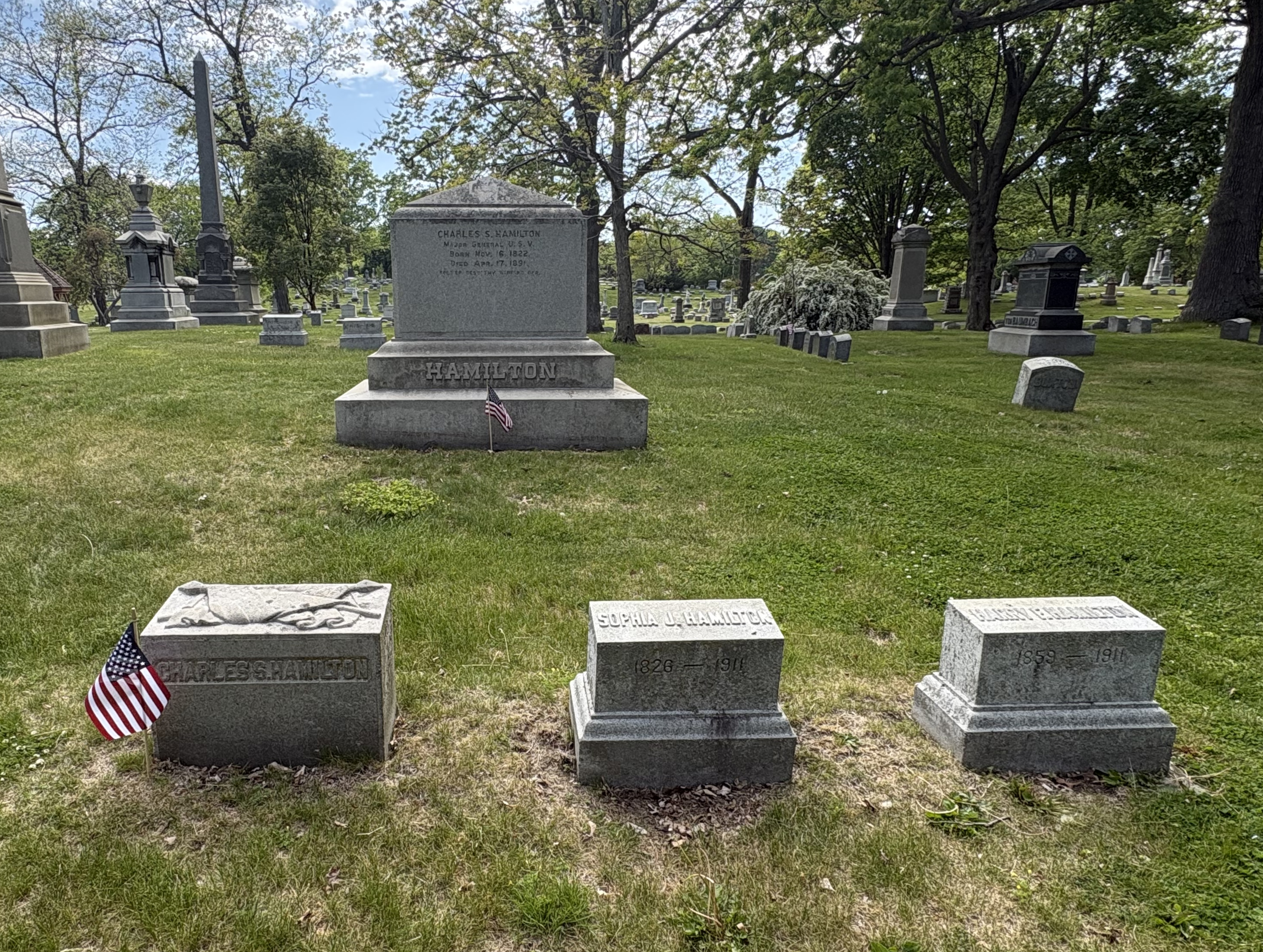
Hamilton's grave at Forest Home Cemetery

After his army service Hamilton became a U.S. marshal and a paper manufacturer. He died in Milwaukee, Wisconsin, in 1891 and is buried there in Forest Home Cemetery.

== Personal life and family ==
Charles Hamilton was a son of Zeyn Alasman Hamilton and his wife Sylvania (née Putnam).

He married Sophia Jane Shepard on February 9, 1849, in Chicago, Illinois.

== See also ==
- List of American Civil War generals (Union)

== Notes ==
Military offices
Regiment established	Command of the 3rd Wisconsin Infantry Regiment; May 11, 1861 – August 10, 1861	Succeeded by Thomas H. Ruger
Legal offices
Preceded by Cassius Fairchild (whole state)	United States Marshal for the Eastern District of Wisconsin; April 1, 1869 – March 17, 1877	Succeeded by Henry Fink
