= School District of Jefferson (Wisconsin) =

School District in Wisconsin, U.S.

Address
- 206 South Taft Ave. Jefferson, Wisconsin, 53549; United States
- Coordinates: 43.004501°N 88.821104°W

District information
- Type: Public
- Motto: Empowering Futures Together
- Grades: Pre-K through 12
- Superintendent: Charles Urness
- School board: 7 members
- Schools: 5
- NCES District ID: 5507050
- District ID: WI-2702

Students and staff
- Students: 1,666 (2023–24)
- Teachers: 138.80 (on an FTE basis)
- Student–teacher ratio: 12.00:1

Other information
- Website: www.sdoj.org

The School District of Jefferson is a rural school district in Jefferson County, Wisconsin, headquartered in Jefferson. The district covers an area of 94 square miles (240 km^{2}) including the city of Jefferson, the towns of Aztalan, Farmington, Hebron, Jefferson, Oakland, Concord, Sullivan, and the village of Sullivan.

In the 2023–2024 school year, there were 1,666 students enrolled in the school district. The superintendent is Charles Urness, and the district's Board of Education has seven members.

== Schools ==
The school district operates three elementary schools (pre-kindergarten through 5th grade), one middle school (6th to 8th grades) and one high school (9th to 12th grades):

- Jefferson High School
- Jefferson Middle School
- East Elementary School
- Sullivan Elementary School
- West Elementary School

Sullivan Elementary School was designated a National Blue Ribbon School in 2022.
