= Truell =

Truell is a surname. Notable people with the surname include:

- David Truell (1814–1889), American politician
- Edi Truell (born 1962), British businessman
- Edwin M. Truell (1841–1907), American soldier
- Lynn Truell (born 1963), American musician
- Michael Truell, American software engineer and entrepreneur
