= George Frohmader =

American politician

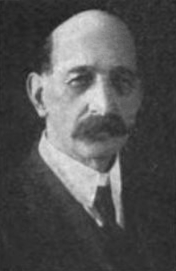

Member of the Wisconsin State Assembly
- In office 1917, 1919

Personal details
- Born: August 7, 1861 Rome, Wisconsin, US
- Died: October 19, 1948 (aged 87) Blooming Grove, Wisconsin, US
- Party: Republican
- Occupation: Merchant, politician

George M. Frohmader (August 7, 1861 – October 19, 1948) was an American merchant and politician.

== Biography ==
Born in the community of Rome, Jefferson County, Wisconsin, Frohmader went to Mauston High School to Mauston, Wisconsin and lived on a farm. He taught school and worked at a general store. Frohmader owned a general merchandise business in Camp Douglas, Wisconsin. He served as president of the village of Camp Douglas, on the school board, and on the Juneau County Board of Supervisors. Frohmader was a Republican and served as postmaster for Camp Douglas. In 1917 and 1919, Frohmader served in the Wisconsin State Assembly. He died at his home in Camp Douglas, Wisconsin.
