= Ralph Davis (guard) =

American football player (1922–1992)

No. 66
- Position: Guard

Personal information
- Born: May 30, 1922; Seymour, Wisconsin, U.S.
- Died: September 26, 1992 (aged 70); Northbrook, Illinois, U.S.
- Listed height: 5 ft 11 in (1.80 m)
- Listed weight: 205 lb (93 kg)

Career information
- High school: Jefferson (Wisconsin)
- College: Wisconsin

Career history
- Green Bay Packers (1947–1948)

Career statistics
- Games played: 22
- Games started: 6
- Stats at Pro Football Reference

Ralph Gordon Davis (May 30, 1922 – September 26, 1992) was an American football guard who played professionally in the National Football League (NFL) with the Green Bay Packers. Davis was originally signed by the Packers in 1947 after playing football at Jefferson High School and then the University of Wisconsin. He played under head coach Curly Lambeau. Davis resigned with the Packers for the 1948 season in July of that year. He ended up playing two seasons for the Packers where he played in 22 games, starting 6 of them. Davis was married to Mary Davis (née Loepfe) and had three children. He died on September 26, 1992 at the age of 70.
