= Camp Douglas, Wisconsin =

- Village
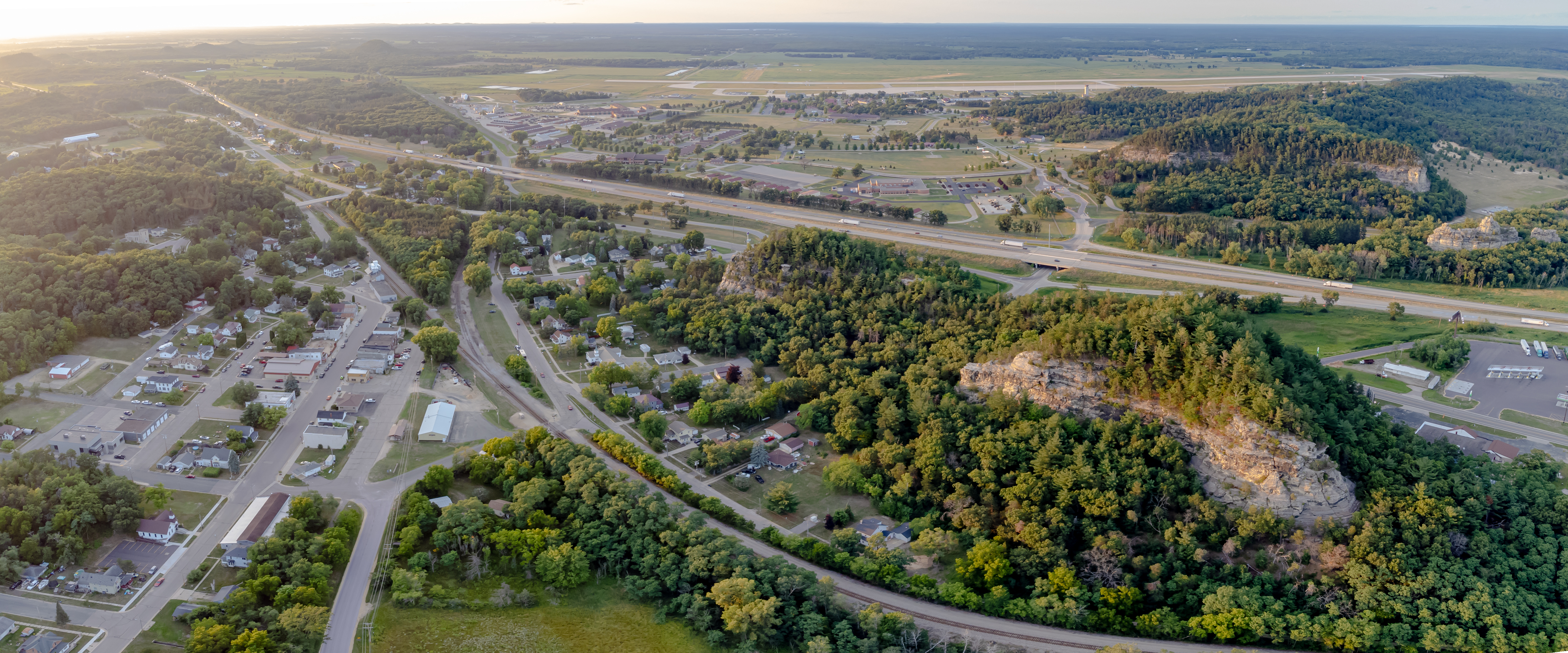

- Location of Camp Douglas in Juneau County, Wisconsin.
- Coordinates: 43°55′16″N 90°16′12″W
- Country: United States
- State: Wisconsin
- County: Juneau

Area
  - Total: 1.00 sq mi (2.59 km^{2})
  - Land: 1.00 sq mi (2.59 km^{2})
  - Water: 0 sq mi (0.00 km^{2})
- Elevation: 942 ft (287 m)

Population (2020)
  - Total: 647
  - Density: 647/sq mi (250/km^{2})
- Time zone: UTC-6 (Central (CST))
  - Summer (DST): UTC-5 (CDT)
- Area code: 608
- FIPS code: 55-12350
- GNIS feature ID: 1562599
- Website: www.campdouglaswi.com

Camp Douglas is a village in Juneau County, Wisconsin, United States. The population was 647 at the 2020 census, up from 601 at the 2010 census. Camp Douglas is home to Volk Field Air National Guard Base.

== History ==
Camp Douglas was laid out in 1870. The village was named after a logging camp established by James Douglas, which brought wood to steam locomotives. A post office called Camp Douglas has been in operation since 1873.

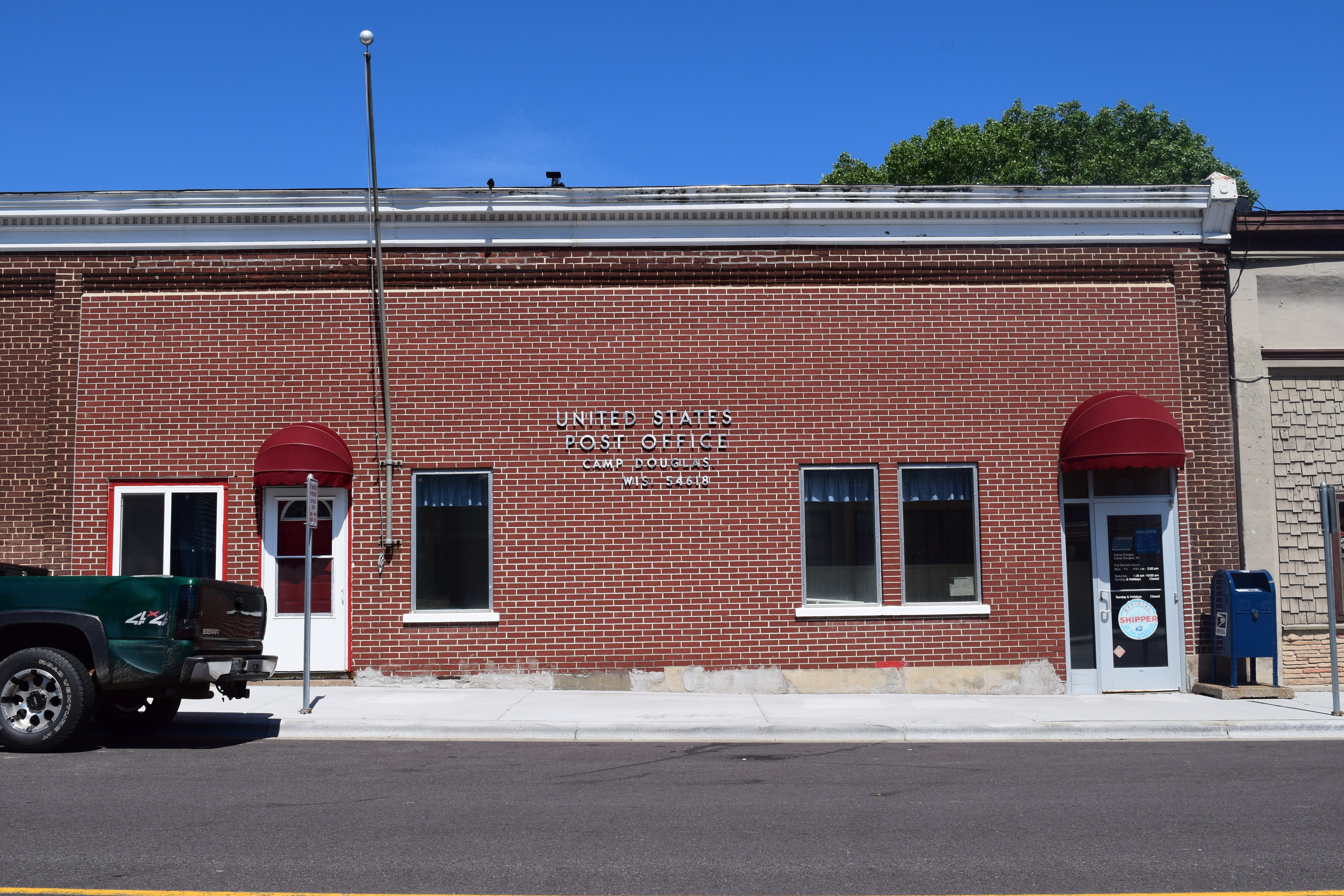
Camp Douglas post office

== Geography ==
According to the United States Census Bureau, the village has a total area of 1.01 square miles (2.62 km^{2}), all land.

== Demographics ==
Historical population
Census	Pop.	Note	%±
1890	225		—
1900	432		92.0%
1910	473		9.5%
1920	471		−0.4%
1930	438		−7.0%
1940	445		1.6%
1950	556		24.9%
1960	489		−12.1%
1970	547		11.9%
1980	589		7.7%
1990	512		−13.1%
2000	592		15.6%
2010	601		1.5%
2020	647		7.7%
U.S. Decennial Census

=== 2010 census ===
As of the census of 2010, there were 601 people, 244 households, and 161 families living in the village. The population density was 595.0 inhabitants per square mile (229.7/km^{2}). There were 264 housing units at an average density of 261.4 per square mile (100.9/km^{2}). The racial makeup of the village was 97.5% White, 0.5% African American, 0.2% Native American, 0.3% Asian, 0.5% from other races, and 1.0% from two or more races. Hispanic or Latino of any race were 0.8% of the population.

There were 244 households, of which 36.5% had children under the age of 18 living with them, 43.9% were married couples living together, 17.6% had a female householder with no husband present, 4.5% had a male householder with no wife present, and 34.0% were non-families. 27.9% of all households were made up of individuals, and 15.2% had someone living alone who was 65 years of age or older. The average household size was 2.46 and the average family size was 3.00.

The median age in the village was 36.3 years. 27.1% of residents were under the age of 18; 7.4% were between the ages of 18 and 24; 29.2% were from 25 to 44; 21.2% were from 45 to 64; and 15.3% were 65 years of age or older. The gender makeup of the village was 47.4% male and 52.6% female.

=== 2000 census ===
As of the census of 2000, there were 592 people, 242 households, and 154 families living in the village. The population density was 621.9 people per square mile (240.6/km^{2}). There were 264 housing units at an average density of 277.3 per square mile (107.3/km^{2}). The racial makeup of the village was 97.64% White, 0.17% African American, 1.01% Native American, 0.34% Asian, 0.17% from other races, and 0.68% from two or more races. Hispanic or Latino of any race were 1.69% of the population.

There were 242 households, out of which 35.1% had children under the age of 18 living with them, 49.2% were married couples living together, 11.2% had a female householder with no husband present, and 36.0% were non-families. 30.2% of all households were made up of individuals, and 16.1% had someone living alone who was 65 years of age or older. The average household size was 2.45 and the average family size was 3.08.

In the village, the population was spread out, with 29.6% under the age of 18, 5.9% from 18 to 24, 30.4% from 25 to 44, 19.4% from 45 to 64, and 14.7% who were 65 years of age or older. The median age was 34 years. For every 100 females, there were 100.0 males. For every 100 females age 18 and over, there were 94.9 males.

The median income for a household in the village was $39,583, and the median income for a family was $44,038. Males had a median income of $31,324 versus $21,607 for females. The per capita income for the village was $17,919. About 2.6% of families and 2.8% of the population were below the poverty line, including 1.3% of those under age 18 and 2.2% of those age 65 or over.

== Notable people ==
- George Frohmader, Wisconsin State Representative and merchant lived in Camp Douglas; he served as the village president and the postmaster.

== Gallery ==
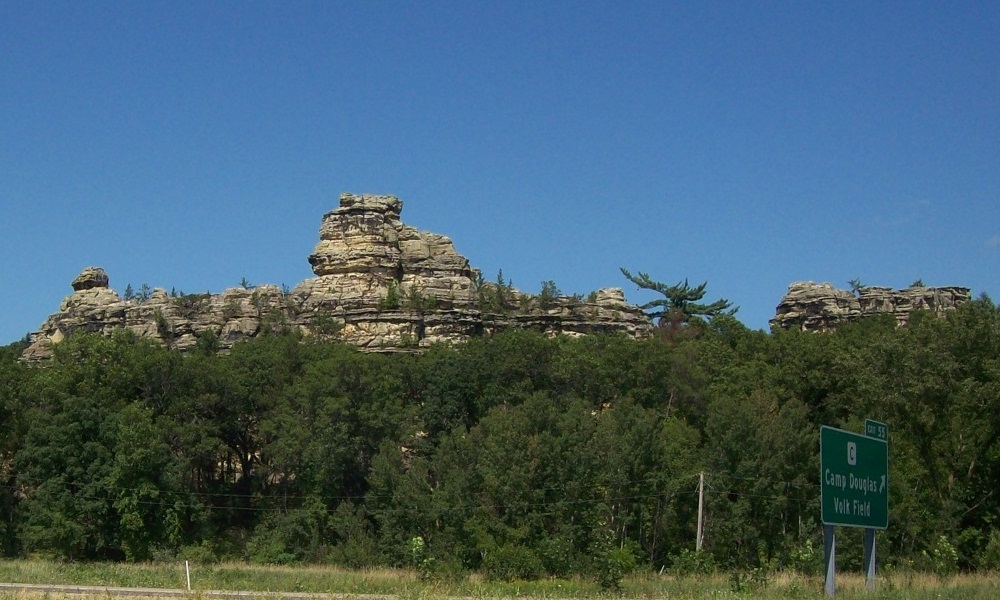
Castle Rock, near Camp Douglas

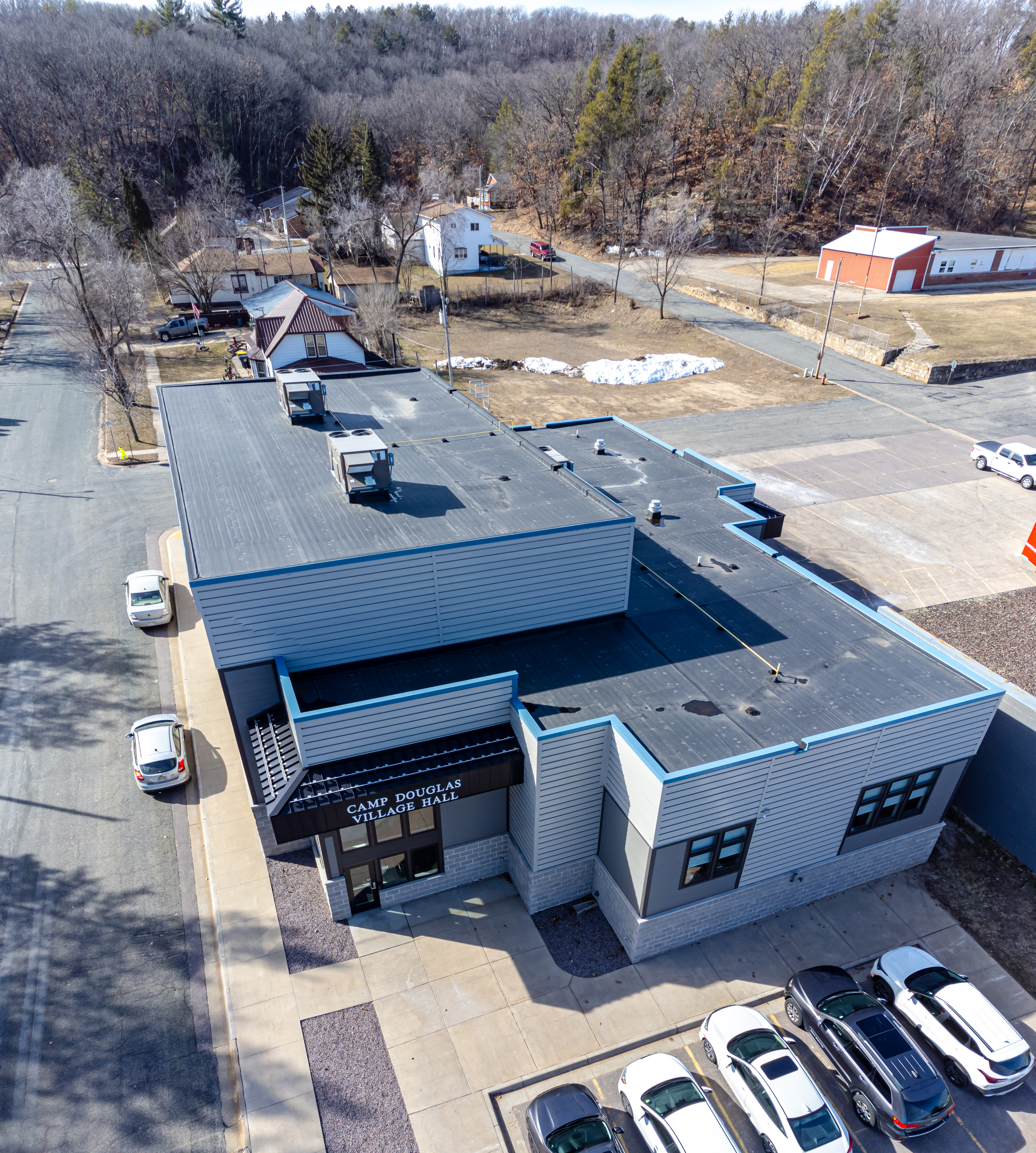
Camp Douglas Village Hall

== See also ==
- List of villages in Wisconsin
