= Rome, Jefferson County, Wisconsin =

Census-designated place in Wisconsin, United States

- Census-designated place
- Location within Wisconsin Location within the United States
- Coordinates: 42°58′50″N 88°37′54″W
- Country: United States
- State: Wisconsin
- County: Jefferson
- Town: Sullivan

Area
  - Total: 3.945 sq mi (10.22 km^{2})
  - Land: 3.708 sq mi (9.60 km^{2})
  - Water: 0.237 sq mi (0.61 km^{2})
- Elevation: 840 ft (260 m)

Population (2020)
  - Total: 752
  - Density: 203/sq mi (78.3/km^{2})
- Time zone: UTC-6 (Central (CST))
  - Summer (DST): UTC-5 (CDT)
- GNIS feature ID: 2393212

Rome is a census-designated place (CDP) in the town of Sullivan in Jefferson County, Wisconsin, United States, along the Bark River. The population was 752 at the 2020 census.

== Geography ==
Rome is located at 42°58′50″N 88°37′54″W (42.980687, -88.631634).

According to the United States Census Bureau, the CDP has a total area of 3.9 square miles (10.2 km^{2}), of which 3.7 square miles (9.6 km^{2}) is land and 0.2 square mile (0.5 km^{2}) (6.01%) is water.

== Demographics ==
Historical population
Census	Pop.	Note	%±
2000	574		—
2010	689		20.0%
2020	752		9.1%
U.S. Decennial Census

As of the census of 2000, there were 574 people, 220 households, and 168 families residing in the CDP. The population density was 145.7 people per square mile (56.2/km^{2}). There were 236 housing units at an average density of 59.9/sq mi (23.1/km^{2}). The racial makeup of the CDP was 99.30% White, 0.17% African American, 0.35% Native American, and 0.17% from two or more races. Hispanic or Latino of any race were 0.52% of the population.

There were 220 households, out of which 29.1% had children under the age of 18 living with them, 66.8% were married couples living together, 5.9% had a female householder with no husband present, and 23.6% were non-families. 18.6% of all households were made up of individuals, and 5.5% had someone living alone who was 65 years of age or older. The average household size was 2.61 and the average family size was 2.98.

In the CDP, the population was spread out, with 23.7% under the age of 18, 7.3% from 18 to 24, 30.5% from 25 to 44, 25.8% from 45 to 64, and 12.7% who were 65 years of age or older. The median age was 39 years. For every 100 females, there were 100.7 males. For every 100 females age 18 and over, there were 102.8 males.

The median income for a household in the CDP was $55,357, and the median income for a family was $60,875. Males had a median income of $36,938 versus $24,063 for females. The per capita income for the CDP was $20,622. About 2.3% of families and 5.3% of the population were below the poverty line, including 11.5% of those under age 18 and none of those age 65 or over.

== Notable people ==
- George Frohmader, Wisconsin State Assemblyman and merchant, was born in Rome.
- Laura Ingalls Wilder's grandmother; Charlotte Holbrook (mother to Caroline Ingalls) lived and died in Rome in 1884. She is buried in the local cemetery. She is the main character of Little House: The Charlotte Years series of books by Melissa Wiley.
