= North Prairie, Wisconsin =

- Village
- Location of North Prairie in Waukesha County, Wisconsin.
- Coordinates: 42°55′59″N 88°24′4″W
- Country: United States
- State: Wisconsin
- County: Waukesha

Area
  - Total: 2.78 sq mi (7.19 km^{2})
  - Land: 2.75 sq mi (7.13 km^{2})
  - Water: 0.023 sq mi (0.06 km^{2})
- Elevation: 948 ft (289 m)

Population (2020)
  - Total: 2,202
  - Density: 809.3/sq mi (312.48/km^{2})
- Time zone: UTC-6 (Central (CST))
  - Summer (DST): UTC-5 (CDT)
- ZIP Code: 53159
- FIPS code: 55-58400
- GNIS feature ID: 1570484
- Website: www.northprairie.net

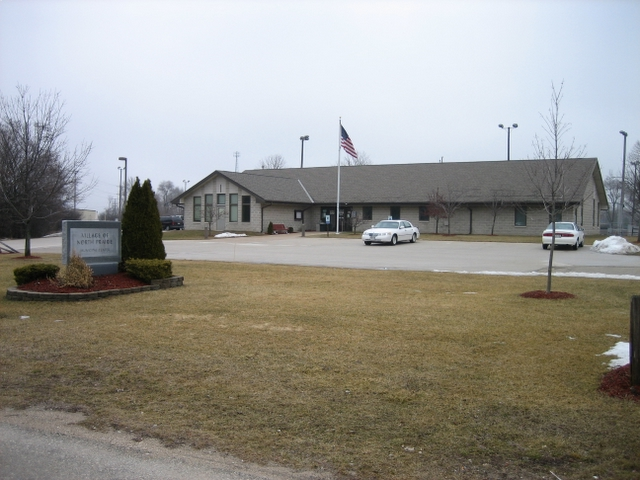
The Village of North Prairie municipal building.

North Prairie is a village in Waukesha County, Wisconsin, United States. It is located in the Town of Genesee, near the town's southwestern corner. The population was 2,202 at the 2020 census.

== History ==
Thomas Sugden and two fellow prospectors from Mukwonago named the village in 1826 (they had gotten this far, "and, as they did not go any farther north, they concluded to call this North Prairie"). Blacksmiths from Eagle, Chas. Raynaus and Mr. Denny, were the first settlers to arrive that following year, although the first claim came from Stillman Smith. Farmers began to settle the North Prairie in the 1830s to raise their prize livestock and grain. The population grew and in 1840 Raynaus began the first school from his house.

By 1850 the village had a general store and post office. The Milwaukee & Mississippi Railroad went through in 1852, but the village remained mostly rural. North Prairie would later become one of the area's more noted residential centers. A rumor of oil in 1866 enabled the North Prairie Petroleum Company to fund $50,000 "to dig a hole & extract oil or minerals," but this venture was a failure.

St. John's Lutheran Church was built in 1877 and North Prairie later incorporated in 1919. Morey Milk Condensery opened a plant in 1917 and by 1920 North Prairie saw a jump in growth due to this industry. Morey Milk employed over 200 people and became a primary source of income to more than 85% of the village households. The plant was sold in 1924 and is no longer in operation.

In an interview with the Milwaukee Journal Sentinel in 2003, the previous owners of Bill's Self-Service and Mini-Mart, Bill and Avis McKenzie, described how the village boomed in the 1940s and 1950s. "We had three grocery stores, a hardware store, a mill, a granary, a post office, a drug store with eating counter, a few taverns with eating space, and three service stations, which at that time all had garages for car repair... One by one, they left town. Now we have one tavern, two service stations, a diner - and Bill's Service."

== Geography ==
North Prairie is located at 42°55'59" North, 88°24'4" West (42.933087, -88.401050).

According to the United States Census Bureau, the village has a total area of 2.84 square miles (7.36 km^{2}), of which 2.81 square miles (7.28 km^{2}) is land and 0.03 square miles (0.08 km^{2}) is water.

== Industry ==
Located in Waukesha County, North Prairie was in the center of a world-leading region of dairy production. With the decline of local dairy production due to urban sprawl, North Prairie has become a bedroom community for commuters to Milwaukee, Waukesha, and surrounding communities.

== Demographics ==
Historical population
Census	Pop.	Note	%±
1920	263		—
1930	292		11.0%
1940	375		28.4%
1950	424		13.1%
1960	489		15.3%
1970	669		36.8%
1980	938		40.2%
1990	1,322		40.9%
2000	1,571		18.8%
2010	2,141		36.3%
2020	2,202		2.8%
U.S. Decennial Census

=== 2010 census ===
As of the census of 2010, there were 2,141 people, 773 households, and 604 families residing in the village. The population density was 761.9 inhabitants per square mile (294.2/km^{2}). There were 799 housing units at an average density of 284.3 per square mile (109.8/km^{2}). The racial makeup of the village was 98.0% White, 0.3% African American, 0.5% Native American, 0.1% Asian, 0.5% from other races, and 0.6% from two or more races. Hispanic or Latino of any race were 2.0% of the population.

There were 773 households, of which 38.8% had children under the age of 18 living with them, 68.6% were married couples living together, 6.2% had a female householder with no husband present, 3.4% had a male householder with no wife present, and 21.9% were non-families. 16.0% of all households were made up of individuals, and 4% had someone living alone who was 65 years of age or older. The average household size was 2.76 and the average family size was 3.14.

The median age in the village was 41 years. 26.3% of residents were under the age of 18; 6.5% were between the ages of 18 and 24; 23.8% were from 25 to 44; 34.6% were from 45 to 64; and 8.6% were 65 years of age or older. The gender makeup of the village was 49.7% male and 50.3% female.

=== 2000 census ===
As of the census of 2000, there were 1,571 people, 531 households, and 449 families residing in the village. The population density was 592.4 people per square mile (228.9/km^{2}). There were 544 housing units at an average density of 205.1 per square mile (79.3/km^{2}). The racial makeup of the village was 99.17% White, 0.00% African American, 0.32% Native American, 0.06% Asian, 0.00% Pacific Islander, 0.13% from other races, and 0.32% from two or more races. 1.08% of the population were Hispanic or Latino of any race.

There were 531 households, out of which 44.4% had children under the age of 18 living with them, 73.6% were married couples living together, 7.2% had a female householder with no husband present, and 15.4% were non-families. 11.1% of all households were made up of individuals, and 2.4% had someone living alone who was 65 years of age or older. The average household size was 2.96 and the average family size was 3.22.

In the village, the population was spread out, with 29.9% under the age of 18, 7.2% from 18 to 24, 32.8% from 25 to 44, 25.0% from 45 to 64, and 5.2% who were 65 years of age or older. The median age was 36 years. For every 100 females, there were 99.1 males. For every 100 females age 18 and over, there were 101.1 males.

The median income for a household in the village was $67,596, and the median income for a family was $70,781. Males had a median income of $41,977 versus $27,250 for females. The per capita income for the village was $24,470. 2.1% of the population and 1.3% of families were below the poverty line. 2.0% of those under the age of 18 and 0.0% of those 65 and older were living below the poverty line.

== Government ==
Under the direction of Village President, the Village Board oversees the functions of the Board of Review, Clerk/Treasurer, Zoning Board of Appeals, Trustees, North Prairie CDA, Finance Committee, Emergency Board, Public Safety and Protective Services, Public Works - Building and Grounds, Municipal Court, Planning Commission, and Police Department.

== Parks and recreation ==
- Veterans Park located off Highway 59 contains a garden area with historic stone houses that have been restored in the past ten years by Don Beranek. It also maintains a pavilion, tennis courts, a children's play area and other amenities.
- Village Park, located on Karin Drive, features a pavilion, softball diamond, soccer fields and a children's play area.
- Broadlands Golf Club, located off Highway 59, opened to the public in August 2000. The golf course has 18 championship style holes and has a driving range. The golf club also features a club house, which has a banquet hall.

== Education ==
Prairie View Elementary School is located on Highway E, set into the gently rolling hills and oak savanna of the kettle moraine area of Wisconsin. The elementary school is a part of the Mukwonago Area School District. There are 2-3 teachers in each grade.

== Notable people ==
- John Grimshaw, Wisconsin State Representative
- Daniel Kelly, Wisconsin Supreme Court justice
- Arthur Oliver Smith, industrial magnate and founder of the A.O. Smith Corporation
- William Zeiman, Wisconsin State Representative
