= Sullivan, Wisconsin =

- Village
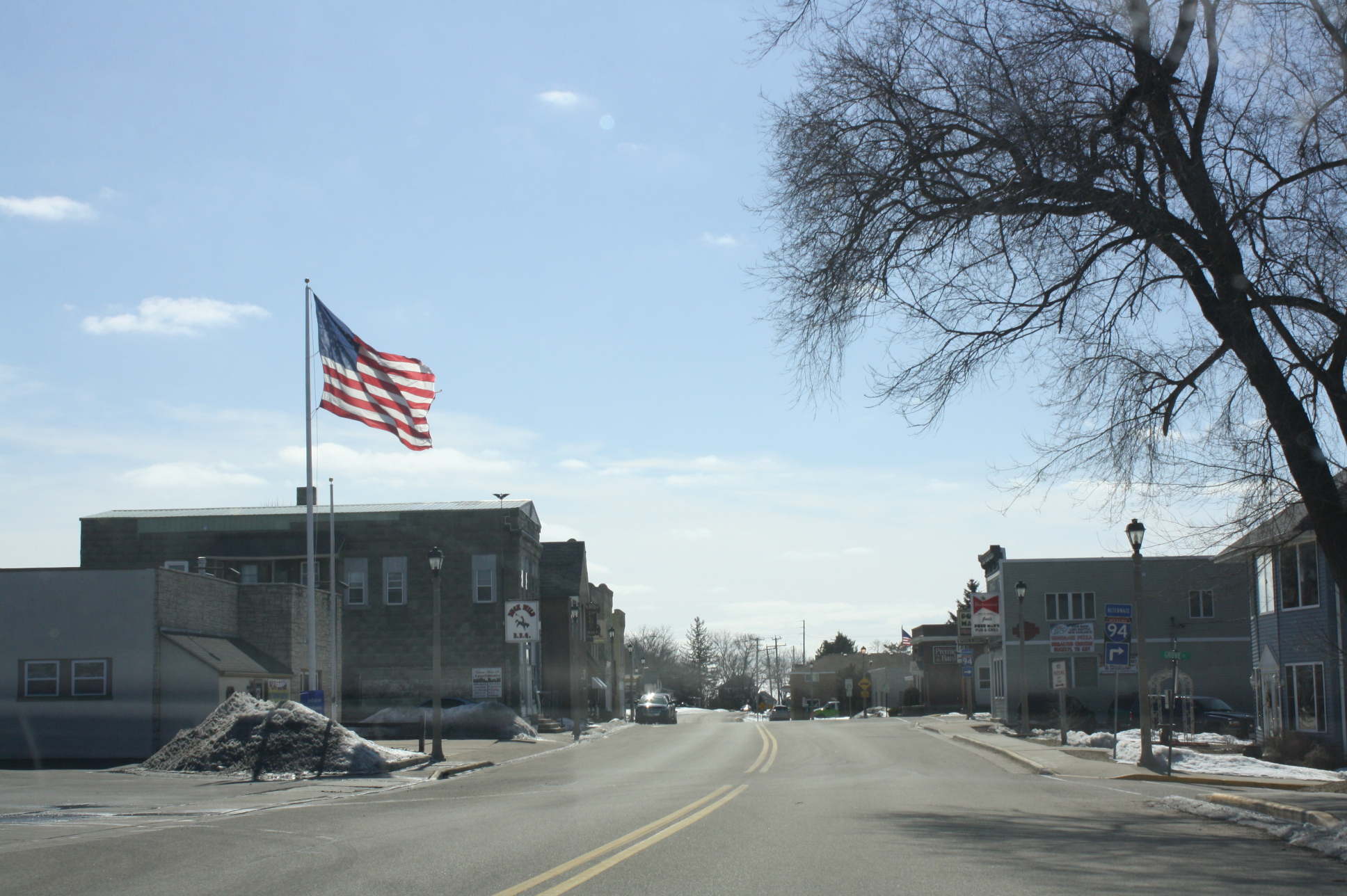
- Looking west at downtown Sullivan

- Location of Sullivan in Jefferson County, Wisconsin
- Coordinates: 42°58′7″N 88°36′32″W
- Country: United States
- State: Wisconsin
- County: Jefferson

Government
  - Type: Village Board
  - President: Terrisa Laurin

Area
  - Total: 1.14 sq mi (2.94 km^{2})
  - Land: 1.13 sq mi (2.93 km^{2})
  - Water: 0.0039 sq mi (0.01 km^{2})
- Elevation: 863 ft (263 m)

Population (2020)
  - Total: 651
  - Density: 587.0/sq mi (226.63/km^{2})
- Time zone: UTC-6 (Central (CST))
  - Summer (DST): UTC-5 (CDT)
- ZIP Code: 53178
- Area code: 262
- FIPS code: 55-78200
- GNIS feature ID: 1575043
- Website: https://www.villageofsullivan-gov.us/

Sullivan (formerly Winfield) is a village in Jefferson County, Wisconsin, United States. The population was 651 at the 2020 census. The village is located within the Town of Sullivan, and is known to residents of southern Wisconsin including the Madison and Milwaukee metro areas as the location of the National Weather Service forecast office MKX, although its mailing address is in nearby Dousman.

== History ==
A post office called Sullivan has been in operation since 1846. The village took its name from the Town of Sullivan.

== Geography ==
Sullivan is located at 43°0′46″N 88°35′15″W (43.012791, -88.587515), about 30 miles (48 km) west of Milwaukee and 40 miles (64 km) east of Madison, approximately 6 miles (10 km) south of Interstate 94. The center of the village is situated at the intersection of Main Street (Hwy 18 and Hwy F) and Palmyra Street (Hwy E).

According to the United States Census Bureau, the village has a total area of 1.14 square miles (2.95 km^{2}), all land.

=== Climate ===
Climate data for Sullivan 3SE, Wisconsin (MKX Weather Forecast Office) (1991–2020 normals, extremes 1995–present)
Month	Jan	Feb	Mar	Apr	May	Jun	Jul	Aug	Sep	Oct	Nov	Dec	Year
Record high °F (°C)	60 (16)	71 (22)	85 (29)	89 (32)	95 (35)	99 (37)	106 (41)	98 (37)	96 (36)	90 (32)	75 (24)	67 (19)	106 (41)
Mean maximum °F (°C)	49.4 (9.7)	52.7 (11.5)	68.3 (20.2)	80.3 (26.8)	86.5 (30.3)	91.6 (33.1)	93.1 (33.9)	91.5 (33.1)	89.3 (31.8)	81.3 (27.4)	66.1 (18.9)	52.2 (11.2)	95.2 (35.1)
Mean daily maximum °F (°C)	26.9 (−2.8)	31.0 (−0.6)	43.2 (6.2)	56.4 (13.6)	68.5 (20.3)	78.3 (25.7)	82.1 (27.8)	80.3 (26.8)	73.3 (22.9)	60.0 (15.6)	45.0 (7.2)	32.5 (0.3)	56.5 (13.6)
Daily mean °F (°C)	19.1 (−7.2)	22.6 (−5.2)	33.5 (0.8)	45.6 (7.6)	57.3 (14.1)	67.2 (19.6)	71.1 (21.7)	69.4 (20.8)	62.0 (16.7)	49.8 (9.9)	36.5 (2.5)	24.9 (−3.9)	46.6 (8.1)
Mean daily minimum °F (°C)	11.3 (−11.5)	14.1 (−9.9)	23.9 (−4.5)	34.7 (1.5)	46.0 (7.8)	56.1 (13.4)	60.1 (15.6)	58.6 (14.8)	50.8 (10.4)	39.5 (4.2)	27.9 (−2.3)	17.4 (−8.1)	36.7 (2.6)
Mean minimum °F (°C)	−10.4 (−23.6)	−5.3 (−20.7)	3.7 (−15.7)	21.8 (−5.7)	32.3 (0.2)	42.9 (6.1)	48.7 (9.3)	48.5 (9.2)	36.5 (2.5)	25.2 (−3.8)	11.5 (−11.4)	−3.0 (−19.4)	−14.7 (−25.9)
Record low °F (°C)	−30 (−34)	−29 (−34)	−13 (−25)	13 (−11)	22 (−6)	33 (1)	41 (5)	40 (4)	29 (−2)	19 (−7)	−2 (−19)	−16 (−27)	−30 (−34)
Average precipitation inches (mm)	1.68 (43)	1.78 (45)	2.13 (54)	3.85 (98)	4.25 (108)	4.90 (124)	4.11 (104)	3.97 (101)	3.47 (88)	2.95 (75)	2.35 (60)	2.08 (53)	37.52 (953)
Average snowfall inches (cm)	13.2 (34)	11.7 (30)	6.3 (16)	2.4 (6.1)	0.0 (0.0)	0.0 (0.0)	0.0 (0.0)	0.0 (0.0)	0.0 (0.0)	0.4 (1.0)	3.2 (8.1)	13.5 (34)	50.7 (129)
Average precipitation days (≥ 0.01 in)	10.6	10.1	9.9	12.5	14.2	12.7	9.9	10.7	9.3	11.4	9.5	10.7	131.5
Average snowy days (≥ 0.1 in)	9.4	8.3	4.8	1.7	0.1	0.0	0.0	0.0	0.0	0.3	2.8	8.4	35.8
Source: NOAA

== Demographics ==
Historical population
Census	Pop.	Note	%±
1920	320		—
1930	323		0.9%
1940	286		−11.5%
1950	349		22.0%
1960	418		19.8%
1970	467		11.7%
1980	434		−7.1%
1990	432		−0.5%
2000	688		59.3%
2010	669		−2.8%
2020	651		−2.7%
U.S. Decennial Census

=== 2010 census ===
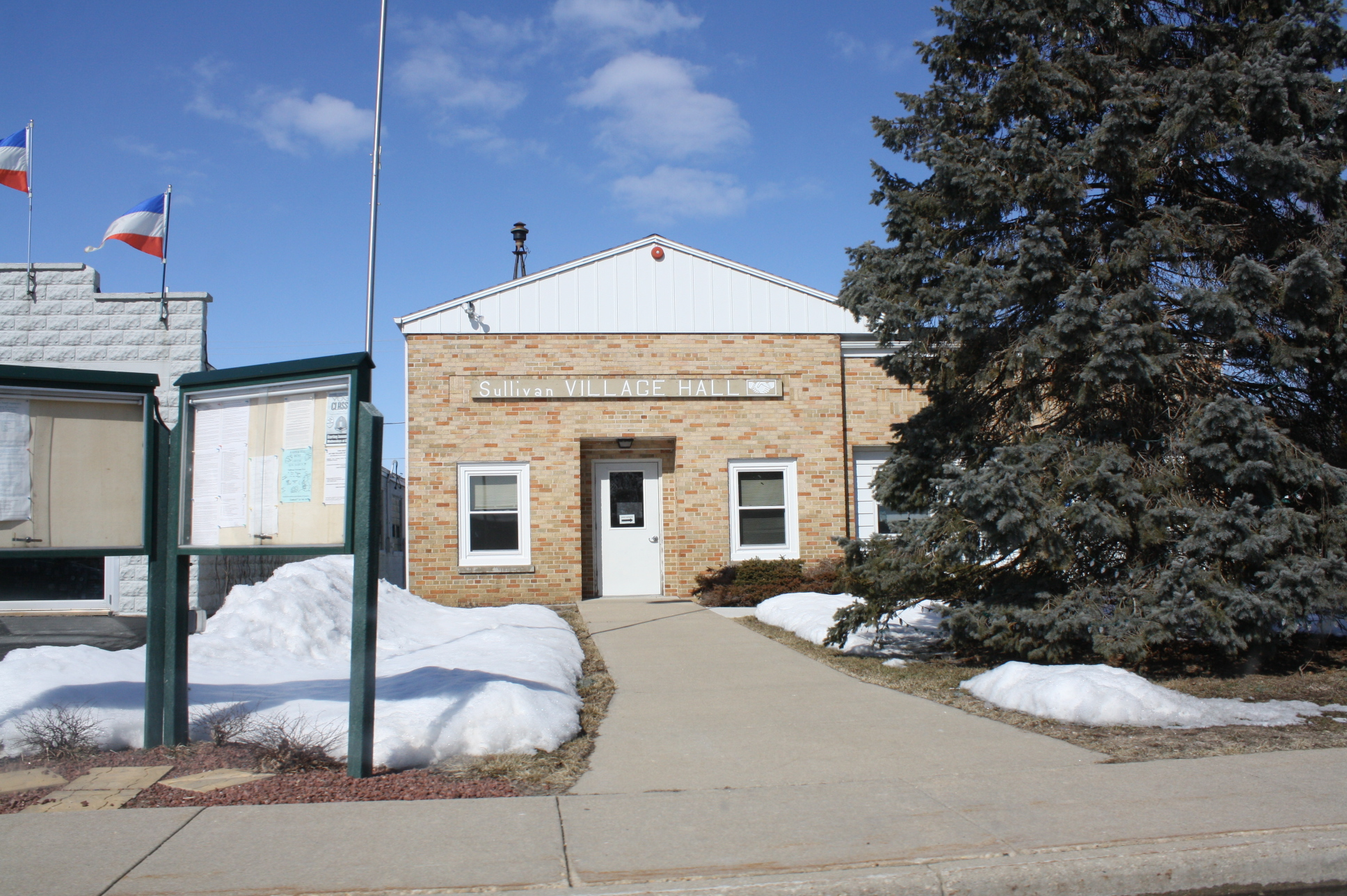
Village hall

As of the census of 2010, there were 669 people, 304 households, and 177 families living in the village. The population density was 586.8 inhabitants per square mile (226.6/km^{2}). There were 328 housing units at an average density of 287.7 per square mile (111.1/km^{2}). The racial makeup of the village was 98.1% White, 0.3% African American, 0.1% Native American, 0.3% Asian, and 1.2% from two or more races. Hispanic or Latino people of any race were 1.6% of the population.

There were 304 households, of which 29.9% had children under the age of 18 living with them, 43.4% were married couples living together, 7.9% had a female householder with no husband present, 6.9% had a male householder with no wife present, and 41.8% were non-families. 36.2% of all households were made up of individuals, and 12.8% had someone living alone who was 65 years of age or older. The average household size was 2.20 and the average family size was 2.86.

The median age in the village was 38.6 years. 22.7% of residents were under the age of 18; 6% were between the ages of 18 and 24; 29.3% were from 25 to 44; 30.2% were from 45 to 64; and 11.8% were 65 years of age or older. The gender makeup of the village was 48.6% male and 51.4% female.

=== 2000 census ===
As of the census of 2000, there were 688 people, 298 households, and 185 families living in the village. The population density was 614.2 people per square mile (237.2/km^{2}). There were 321 housing units at an average density of 286.6 per square mile (110.7/km^{2}). The racial makeup of the village was 98.98% White, 0.15% Black or African American, 0.29% Native American, 0.29% Asian, 0.15% from other races, and 0.15% from two or more races. 0.15% of the population were Hispanic or Latino of any race.

There were 298 households, out of which 30.2% had children under the age of 18 living with them, 49.3% were married couples living together, 6.7% had a female householder with no husband present, and 37.9% were non-families. 30.5% of all households were made up of individuals, and 9.7% had someone living alone who was 65 years of age or older. The average household size was 2.31 and the average family size was 2.92.

In the village, the population was spread out, with 22.2% under the age of 18, 9.9% from 18 to 24, 39.2% from 25 to 44, 18.3% from 45 to 64, and 10.3% who were 65 years of age or older. The median age was 34 years. For every 100 females, there were 104.8 males. For every 100 females age 18 and over, there were 109.0 males.

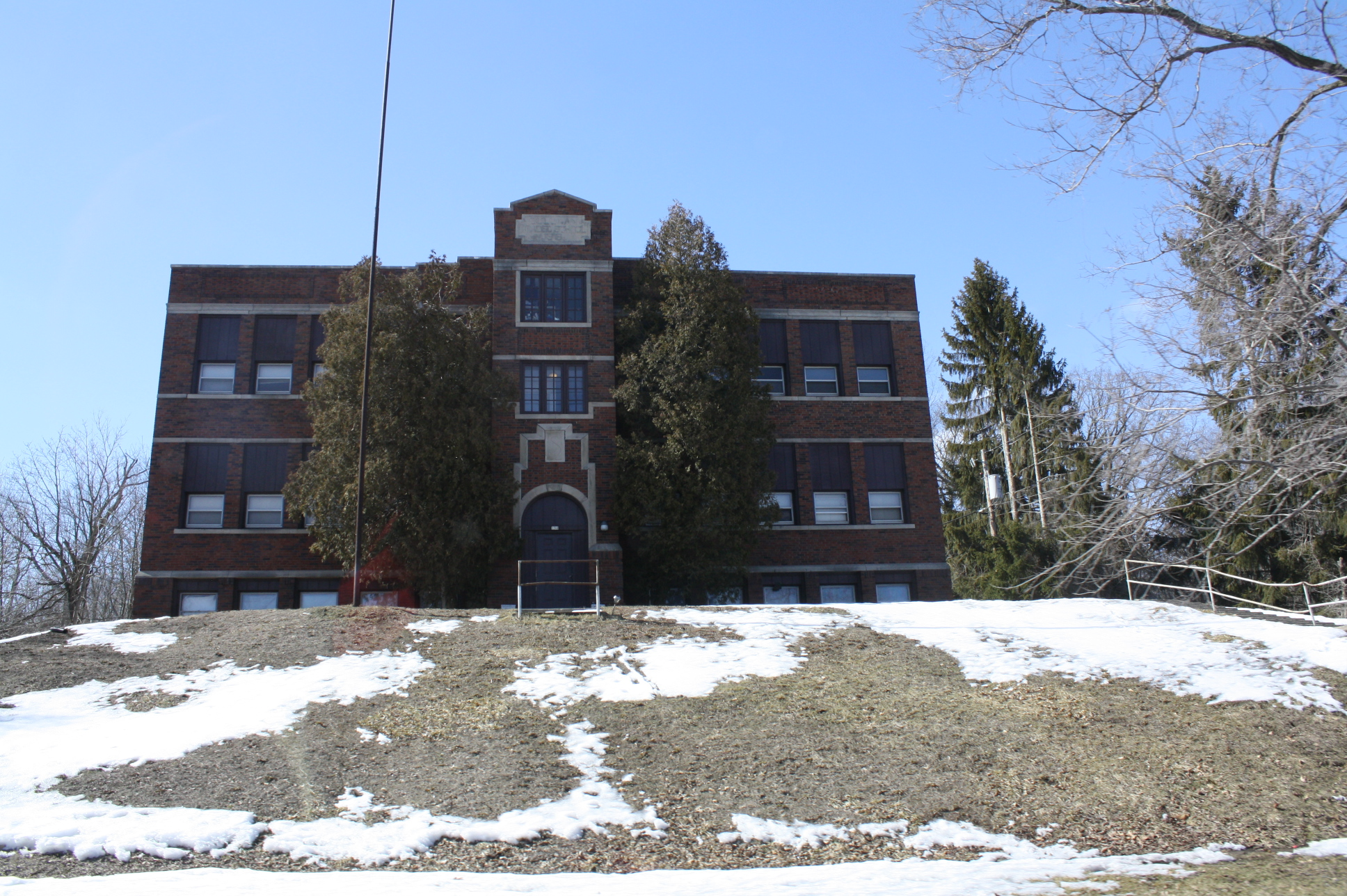
Sullivan Elementary School

The median income for a household in the village was $43,229, and the median income for a family was $50,833. Males had a median income of $36,875 versus $27,404 for females. The per capita income for the village was $24,621. About 1.0% of families and 1.8% of the population were below the poverty line, including 2.2% of those under age 18 and 2.4% of those age 65 or over.

== Education ==
Sullivan Elementary School was the only school in the village, but is no longer open. However, a new Sullivan Elementary School was built nearby and is part of School District of Jefferson. It is located only a few blocks from Main Street.
