= Frank Fitzgerald (Wisconsin politician) =

American politician

Frank Fitzgerald was a member of the Wisconsin State Assembly during the 1877 session. Additionally, he was Chairman (similar to Mayor), Assessor and Treasurer of Hartford (town), Wisconsin. He was a Democrat. Fitzgerald was born on August 20, 1824, in County Tipperary, Ireland.
