= Sullivan (town), Wisconsin =

Civil town in Jefferson County, Wisconsin, United States of America

Sullivan
- Town
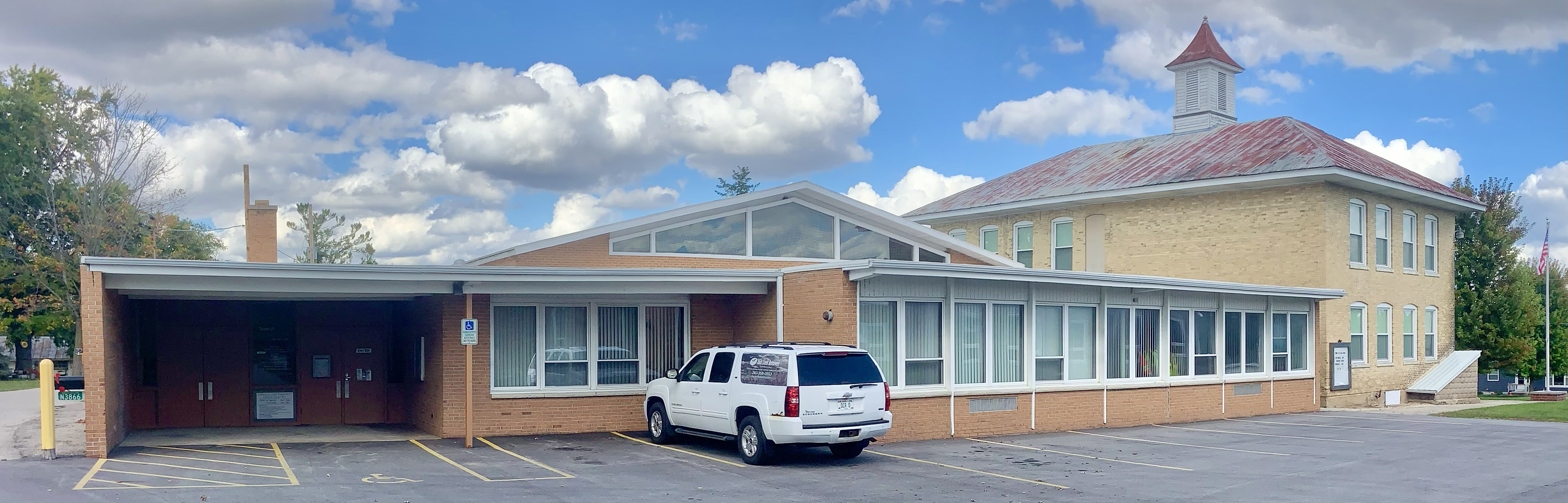
- Town hall in Rome, Wisconsin

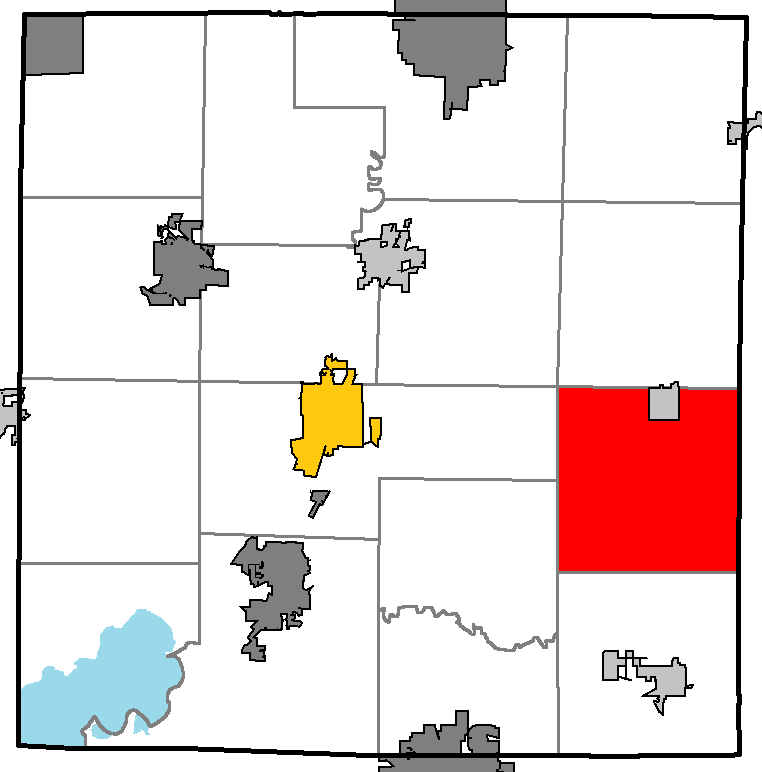
- Location of Sullivan in Jefferson County, Wisconsin

- Location in Wisconsin and the United States Sullivan (the United States)
- Coordinates: 42°58′17″N 88°36′46″W
- Country: United States
- State: Wisconsin
- County: Jefferson

Area
  - Total: 35.5 sq mi (92.0 km^{2})
  - Land: 34.7 sq mi (89.8 km^{2})
  - Water: 0.85 sq mi (2.2 km^{2})
- Elevation: 863 ft (263 m)

Population (2020)
  - Total: 2,295
  - Density: 66.2/sq mi (25.6/km^{2})
- Time zone: UTC-6 (Central (CST))
  - Summer (DST): UTC-5 (CDT)
- ZIP Code: 53178
- Area code: 262
- FIPS code: 55-77900
- GNIS feature ID: 1584246
- Website: Town of Sullivan, Wisconsin - Official Website

Sullivan is a town in Jefferson County, Wisconsin, United States. The population was 2,295 at the 2020 census. The village of Sullivan, the census-designated place of Rome, and the unincorporated communities of Heath Mills, Oak Hill, and Slabtown are located in the town.

== History ==
The Town of Sullivan was named for John Sullivan, an officer in the American Revolutionary War.

== Geography ==
According to the United States Census Bureau, the town has a total area of 35.5 square miles (92.0 km^{2}), of which 34.7 square miles (89.8 km^{2}) is land and 0.9 square miles (2.2 km^{2}), or 2.39%, is water.

== Demographics ==
As of the census of 2000, there were 2,124 people, 819 households, and 609 families residing in the town. The population density was 61.3 people per square mile (23.7/km^{2}). There were 861 housing units at an average density of 24.8 per square mile (9.6/km^{2}). The racial makeup of the town was 97.83% White, 0.14% Black or African American, 0.52% Native American, 0.05% Asian, 0.05% Pacific Islander, 0.80% from other races, and 0.61% from two or more races. 2.35% of the population were Hispanic or Latino of any race.

There were 819 households, out of which 31.5% had children under the age of 18 living with them, 63.1% were married couples living together, 7.8% had a female householder with no husband present, and 25.6% were non-families. 19.5% of all households were made up of individuals, and 6.5% had someone living alone who was 65 years of age or older. The average household size was 2.59 and the average family size was 2.98.

In the town, the population was spread out, with 24.9% under the age of 18, 6.5% from 18 to 24, 31.6% from 25 to 44, 26.6% from 45 to 64, and 10.5% who were 65 years of age or older. The median age was 38 years. For every 100 females, there were 103.1 males. For every 100 females age 18 and over, there were 102.7 males.

The median income for a household in the town was $50,492, and the median income for a family was $55,119. Males had a median income of $38,688 versus $25,208 for females. The per capita income for the town was $22,753. About 2.3% of families and 5.1% of the population were below the poverty line, including 8.3% of those under age 18 and 3.6% of those age 65 or over.
