= Robert A. Kinzie III =

Professor of biology and zoology

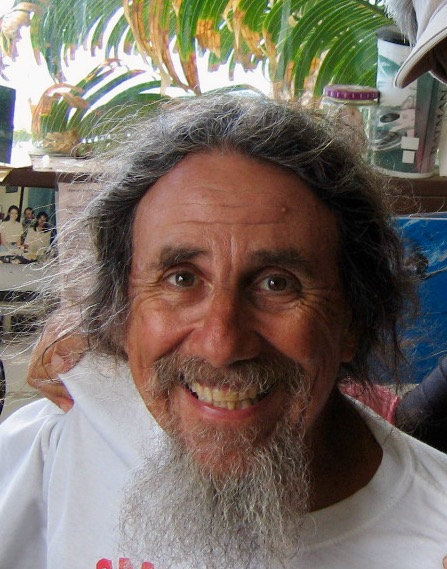
Robert A. Kinzie III in his office in the Coral Reef Ecology Lab at the Hawaii Institute of Marine Biology, 2006.

Robert Allen Kinzie III (September 1, 1942 – December 31, 2022) was a professor of biology and zoology at the University of Hawaiʻi from 1972 to 2009. He specialized as a limnologist in the study of Hawaii's stream ecosystems and the native amphidromous animal species which inhabit them. He also studied coral reef ecosystems and their interactions with freshwater streams, as well as their reactions to changing environmental conditions.

== Biography ==
Kinzie received his Bachelor of Science degree from Santa Clara University in 1963. He then went on to earn his Master of Science from University of Hawaiʻi in 1966. He earned his PhD from Yale University in 1970, where he focused his dissertation on the coral reefs of Discovery Bay, Jamaica.

Kinzie is cited in a 2007 report by the Bishop Museum as being a pioneer in the research of Hawaii's stream ecosystems in the 1980s. One of his specialties was studying Hawaiian amphidromous gobies, or O'opu. His 1982 paper, "Life Crawls Upstream", cowritten with John I. Ford, was featured in University of Hawaii professor E. Alison Kay's 1994 book, A Natural History of the Hawaiian Islands: Selected Readings II. He is quoted in a BBC article titled, "The odd Hawaiian fish that climbs cliffs", describing population density of the species in the Hawaiian archipelago.

Kinzie also made several contributions to books written on gorgonian corals, including the section on soft coral species in Eugene Herbert Kaplan's A Field Guide to Coral Reefs: Caribbean and Florida. He presented a paper at the Fifth International Congress on the History of Oceanography held at the Scripps Institution of Oceanography in 2002 titled "Caribbean Contributions to Coral Reef Scienceu hi", which is featured in Oceanographic History: The Pacific and Beyond, a collection of the conference proceedings.

Kinzie served on multiple advisory boards throughout his career. He served on the Aquatic Resources Technical Advisory Committee under the Commission of Water Resource Management. During the late 1990s, Kinzie was involved in the Hawaiʻi Natural Area Reserves System (NARS) Commission through the DLNR's Division of Forestry and Wildlife. Both of these organizations work towards protecting and conserving the very ecosystems Kinzie studied through his research as a scientist.

Upon retiring from the University of Hawaiʻi, Kinzie became an environmental consultant. In 2009, he performed a study of East Maui's stream habitats to create recommendations for the uses of freshwater in the area while also maintaining the health of these ecosystems for important native species. In 2014, he worked on a project in collaboration with Kamehameha Schools to manage invasive species in the Hale`iwa’s Uko`a wetland of Oahu.

== Personal life ==
A lifelong friend of Jorma Kaukonen, guitarist for the band Jefferson Airplane, Kinzie is credited as playing a foundational role in the formation of the rock band.

Kinzie was involved in Hawaii's Aikido community as a Sensei at the Windward Aikido Club in Kaneohe on the island of Oahu.

Kinzie sported long hair and a beard, and in 2005 he joined the Luxuriant Flowing Hair Club for Scientists.

== Publications ==
- 1970. Robert A. Kinzie. "The Ecology of the Gorgonians (cnidaria Octocorallia) of Discovery Bay, Jamaica" Yale University ProQuest Dissertations Publishing.
- 1979. Kinzie, R.A., III, & J.I. Ford. "An ecological survey of Pua'alu'u Stream, Maui" Tech. Rep. 27, Pages 1–40 Cooperative National Park Resources Study Unit, University of Hawaii, Honolulu.
- 1982. Robert A. Kinzie & John I. Ford "Life crawls upstream". Natural History, 91 (12), 60–60.
- 1996. Kinzie III, R.A. & Buddemeier R.W., "Reefs happen". Global Change Biology, 2(6), Pages 479–494
- 1998. Robert A. Kinzie III, Anastazia T. Banaszak & Michael P. Lesser. "Effects of ultraviolet radiation on primary productivity in a high altitude tropical lake" Hydrobiologia, 385: Pages 23 – 32.
- 1999. Robert A. Kinzie III, "Sex, Symbiosis and Coral Reef Communities", American Zoologist, Volume 39, Issue 1, Pages 80–91
- 2001. Kinzie III, R. A., M. Takayama, S. R. Santos and M. A. Coffroth. 2001. "The adaptive bleaching hypothesis: Experimental tests of critical assumptions". Biol. Bull. 200: Pages 51–58.
- 2001. Radtke, R.L., R. A. Kinzie III and D. J. Shafer. "Temporal and spatial variation in length of larval life and size at settlement of the Hawaiian amphidromous goby, Lentipes concolor." Journal of Fish Biology. 59:928–938.
- 2006. Kinzie III, R. A., C. Chong, J. Deverell, D. Lindstrom and R. Wolff. "Effects of water removal on a Hawaiian stream ecosystem". Pacific Science. 60: 1: Pages 1 – 47.
- 2009. Santos, S. R., J. Toyoshima and R. A. Kinzie III. "Spatial and temporal dynamics of symbiotic dinoflagellates (Symbiodinium: Dinophyta) in the perforate coral Montipora capitata." Galaxea, Journal of Coral Reef Studies 11: 1–9.
