= John Grimshaw (politician) =

American politician

John Grimshaw (May 2, 1842 – November 30, 1917) was an American businessman and politician.

Grimshaw was born in Farsley, Yorkshire, England. He emigrated with his parents to the United States in 1844 and settled in Waukesha County, Wisconsin Territory. Grimshaw was involved in the hardware business in North Prairie, Wisconsin. In 1872, he moved to Elroy, Wisconsin where he continued in the hardware business. Grimshaw served on the Plymouth Town Board and on the Juneau County Board of Supervisors. In 1885 and 1886, Grimshaw served in the Wisconsin Assembly and was a Democrat. Grimshaw died at his home in Elroy, Wisconsin.
