= Coon, Wisconsin =

Coon Valley, Wisconsin
- Town
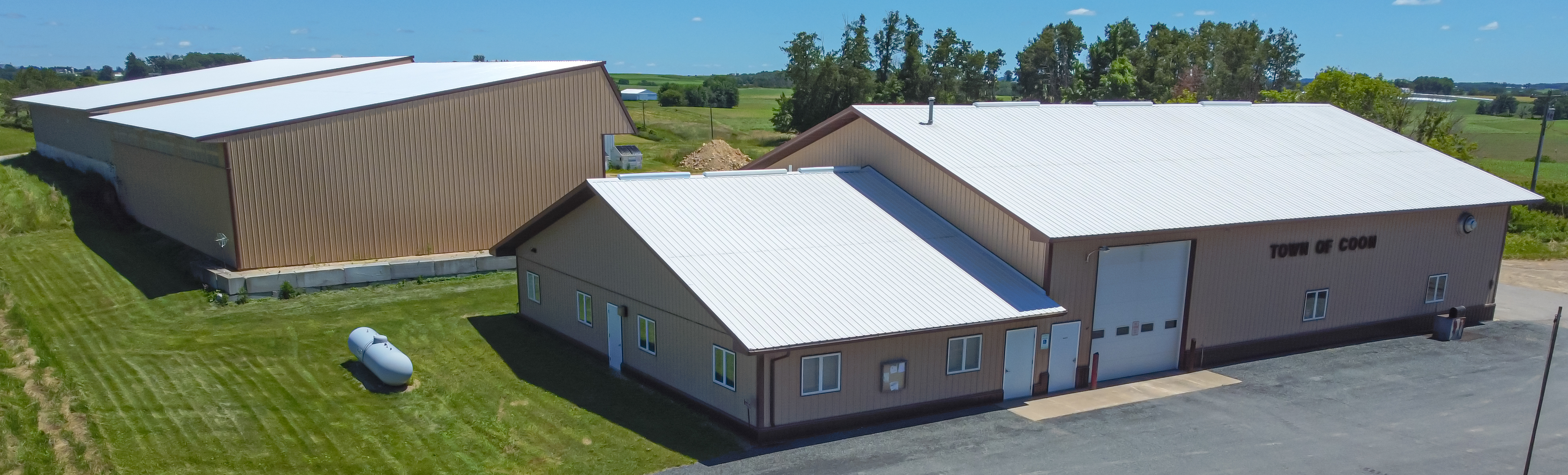
- Town Hall

- Location in Vernon County and the state of Wisconsin.
- Coordinates: 43°41′18″N 90°58′49″W
- Country: United States
- State: Wisconsin
- County: Vernon

Area
  - Total: 34.9 sq mi (90.3 km^{2})
  - Land: 34.9 sq mi (90.3 km^{2})
  - Water: 0 sq mi (0.0 km^{2})
- Elevation: 1,043 ft (318 m)

Population (2020)
  - Total: 729
  - Density: 20.9/sq mi (8.07/km^{2})
- Time zone: UTC-6 (Central (CST))
  - Summer (DST): UTC-5 (CDT)
- Area code: 608
- FIPS code: 55-16875
- GNIS feature ID: 1583013
- Website: https://www.townofcoon.com/

Coon Valley is a town in Vernon County, Wisconsin, United States. The population was 729 at the 2020 census.

== Geography ==
According to the United States Census Bureau, the town has a total area of 34.8 square miles (90.3 km^{2}), all land.

== Demographics ==
As of the census of 2000, there were 683 people, 262 households, and 197 families residing in the town. The population density was 19.6 people per square mile (7.6/km^{2}). There were 295 housing units at an average density of 8.5 per square mile (3.3/km^{2}). The racial makeup of the town was 99.56% White, 0.15% Native American, 0.15% from other races, and 0.15% from two or more races. Hispanic or Latino of any race were 0.15% of the population.

There were 262 households, out of which 36.3% had children under the age of 18 living with them, 69.8% were married couples living together, 3.4% had a female householder with no husband present, and 24.8% were non-families. 21.8% of all households were made up of individuals, and 10.3% had someone living alone who was 65 years of age or older. The average household size was 2.61 and the average family size was 3.09.

In the town, the population was spread out, with 26.8% under the age of 18, 4.7% from 18 to 24, 27.4% from 25 to 44, 27.2% from 45 to 64, and 13.9% who were 65 years of age or older. The median age was 40 years. For every 100 females, there were 105.7 males. For every 100 females age 18 and over, there were 110.1 males.

The median income for a household in the town was $41,364, and the median income for a family was $50,568. The median income for males was $30,917 and $22,813 for females. The per capita income for the town was $20,460. About 5.3% of families and 8.1% of the population were below the poverty line, including 8.9% of those under age 18 and 11.7% of those age 65 or over.
