= Adolf Scheuber =

American politician

Adolf Scheuber (January 23, 1833 – April 12, 1892) was an American farmer and politician.

Born in Prussia, Scheuber emigrated to the United States in 1849 and eventually settled in Erfurt, Jefferson County, Wisconsin. He was a farmer and merchant. Scheuber served as notary public, register of deeds for Jefferson County and as superintendent of the poor. In 1877, Scheuber served in the Wisconsin State Assembly and was a Democrat. Later, Scheuber lived in Milwaukee, Wisconsin where he died.
