= Freeman Lindsay =

American politician

Freeman Dewitt Lindsay (February 19, 1837 – June 26, 1896) was an American politician and member of the Wisconsin State Assembly.

== Biography ==
Lindsay was born in 1837 in North Hudson, New York. During the American Civil War, he was an officer with the 118th New York Volunteer Infantry of the Union Army. Conflicts he took part in include the Battle of Drewry's Bluff, the Battle of Chaffin's Farm and the siege of Petersburg. Afterwards, Lindsay settled in Neillsville, Wisconsin.

== Political career ==
Lindsay was a member of the Assembly during the 1877 session. Previously, he had been Sheriff of Clark County, Wisconsin, from 1871 to 1873. He was a Republican.
