= William Zeiman =

American politician

An 1877 portrait of William Zeiman

William Zeiman was an American politician. He was a Democratic member of the Wisconsin State Assembly. Zeiman was a member during the 1877 session from the 1st District of Dodge County, Wisconsin. He was born on March 31, 1846, in what is now North Prairie, Wisconsin in what is now Waukesha County, Wisconsin.
