= Anson Allen =

American businessman and politician

Member of the Wisconsin State Assembly
- In office 1879–1879

Personal details
- Born: Anson Coleman Allen; February 25, 1838 Rochester, New York
- Died: March 23, 1880 (aged 42) Milwaukee, Wisconsin

Anson Coleman Allen (February 25, 1838 – March 23, 1880) was an American businessman and politician.

Born in Rochester, New York, Allen settled in Milwaukee, Wisconsin and was in the transportation and forwarding business between the western and eastern sections of the United States. He served in the Wisconsin State Assembly in 1879 as a Republican. He died in Milwaukee, Wisconsin.
