= John Gray (Wisconsin politician, born 1817) =

American politician

John Gray (born April 10, 1817, in Redruth, Cornwall, England) was an American politician. He was a member of the Wisconsin State Assembly during the 1877 and 1878 sessions. He was a Republican.
