= Robert Kinzie (politician) =

American politician (1840–1936)

- Born: February 24, 1840; Racine, Wisconsin
- Died: February 22, 1936 (aged 95)
- Occupation: Member of the Wisconsin State Assembly
- Known for: Chairman (similar to Mayor) of Pulaski (town), Wisconsin, and Justice of the Peace

Robert Hale Kinzie (February 24, 1840 – February 22, 1936) was a member of the Wisconsin State Assembly.

== Biography ==
Kinzie was born on February 24, 1840, in what is now Racine, Wisconsin. In 1871, he settled in Avoca, Wisconsin. His brother-in-law, Joseph A. Frost, was also a member of the Assembly. Kinzie died on February 22, 1936.

== Career ==
Kinzie was a member of the Assembly during the 1877 session. Other positions he held include Chairman (similar to Mayor) of Pulaski (town), Wisconsin, and justice of the peace. He was a Democrat.
