= Franklin Mitchell (Wisconsin politician) =

American politician

Franklin Mitchell (October 1, 1824 – May 11, 1911) was a member of the Wisconsin State Assembly.

== Biography ==
Mitchell was born on October 1, 1824, in Fayette County, Pennsylvania. He later resided in Spring Grove, Wisconsin. He died in Los Angeles in 1911.

== Career ==
Mitchell was a member of the Assembly during the 1877, 1878, and 1879 sessions. Additionally, he was a member of the Town Board (similar to city council) of Spring Grove. He was a Republican.
