= Peter Salentine =

American hardware dealer and politician

Peter Salentine (January 14, 1829 – January 6, 1884) was an American hardware dealer and politician.

Born in Germany, Salentine emigrated to the United States and settled in Milwaukee, Wisconsin Territory in 1847. He also lived in California for five years before returning to Milwaukee, Wisconsin. Salentine was a hardware dealer in Milwaukee. He served on the Milwaukee Common Council and was a Democrat. In 1876, Salentine was elected to the Wisconsin State Assembly. However, Henry Fink successfully contested the election results in 1877. In 1884, Salentine killed himself in Milwaukee, Wisconsin.
