= Heath Mills, Wisconsin =

- Unincorporated community
- Location within Wisconsin Location within the United States
- Coordinates: 42°59′02″N 88°34′27″W
- Country: United States
- State: Wisconsin
- County: Jefferson
- Town: Sullivan
- Elevation: 850 ft (260 m)
- Time zone: UTC-6 (Central (CST))
  - Summer (DST): UTC-5 (CDT)
- Zip: 53135
- Area code: 920
- GNIS feature ID: 1577634

Heath Mills (also Erfurt) is an unincorporated community located in the town of Sullivan, Jefferson County, Wisconsin, United States.

== Notable people ==
- Adolf Scheuber, Wisconsin State Assemblyman, merchant, and farmer, lived here.
