= Henry Fink =

American politician

Henry Fink was a member of the Wisconsin State Assembly.

== Biography ==
Fink was born on September 7, 1840, in Rhenish Bavaria. In 1852, he moved with his parents to Milwaukee County, Wisconsin. During the American Civil War, Fink served with the 26th Wisconsin Volunteer Infantry Regiment of the Union Army. He eventually had to leave the front lines after being wounded during the Battle of Chancellorsville. He was a member of the Grand Army of the Republic.

== Political career ==
Fink was a member of the Assembly from 1876 to 1877. The seat was challenged by Peter Salentine and Fink successfully contested the race. He was then appointed U.S. Marshal for the Eastern District of Wisconsin by Rutherford B. Hayes. After being re-appointed to the same position by James A. Garfield, Fink was appointed U.S. Collector of Internal Revenue of the 1st Wisconsin District in 1889. He held the position until 1893, but was re-appointed to the position by William McKinley in 1897. Fink was a Republican.

== See also ==
- The Political Graveyard
