= David Truell =

American politician

David Truell was a member of the Wisconsin State Assembly.

== Biography ==
Truell was born on August 9, 1814, in Grafton, New Hampshire. He died on February 8, 1889.

== Career ==
Truell was a member of the Assembly during the 1877 session. Additionally, he was Supervisor of Lyndon, Juneau County, Wisconsin, Register of Deeds of Juneau County, Wisconsin and a justice of the peace. He was a Republican.
