= Joseph A. Frost =

American politician

Joseph A. Frost (October 28, 1837 in Pennsylvania – ?) was an American politician. He was a member of the Wisconsin State Assembly during the 1867 session.

Frost moved with his parents to Clyde, Wisconsin in 1849, where he was involved in farming, business and manufacturing. In 1870, he married Jenny Lind Kinzie. The couple had five children. Frost was a member of the Assembly during the 1867 session. He also served as a member of the County Board of Iowa County, Wisconsin. A Republican, he was affiliated with the National Union Party.
