= David P. Hull =

American politician

David P. Hull was a member of the Wisconsin State Assembly.

== Biography ==
Hull was born on August 22, 1817. He graduated from what is now the University of Cincinnati College of Law in 1840 and moved to Milwaukee, Wisconsin in 1851.

== Career ==
Hull was a member of the Assembly during the 1877 session. Previously, he had been a member of the Milwaukee Common Council in 1869 and 1870. He was a Republican.
