= Lambert Brost =

American politician (1835–1909)

Lambert Joseph Brost (October 10, 1835 – November 6, 1909) was a member of the Wisconsin State Assembly.

== Biography ==
Brost was born on October 10, 1835, in Ulmen, Prussia. He later resided in Calumet, Wisconsin. On July 11, 1859, Brost married Anna Mussburger. They had eleven children. He died on November 6, 1909.

== Career ==
Brost was a member of the Assembly from 1876 to 1877. He served as a court commissioner for taxes in 1881. Other positions he held include Chairman of the Calumet Town Board of Supervisors and of the County Board of Fond du Lac County, Wisconsin. He was a Democrat.
