= Joseph Hamilton (Wisconsin assemblyman) =

American politician (1826–1912)

Joseph Hamilton (July 14, 1826 – March 16, 1912) was an American printer, newspaper editor, and life insurance agent from Milwaukee, Wisconsin who spent two one-year terms as a member of the Wisconsin State Assembly: in 1874 as a member of the short-lived People's Reform Party, also known as the Liberal Reform Party, and in 1877 as a Democrat.

== Early life ==
He was born in New York City on July 14, 1826, and received an academic education. He came to Wisconsin in 1849 and settled at Milwaukee, where he was engaged in the printing business for many years; in 1851 and 1852 he was editor and part-owner of the Milwaukee Daily Journal. By 1873, he had become a life insurance agent.

== Legislative service ==
In 1873, having never run for office before, he was elected to Milwaukee County's 2nd Assembly seat (the 2nd Ward of the City of Milwaukee). (Incumbent Jacob Sander, who was also part of the Liberal Reform Party, was not a candidate for re-election.) He received 1,277 votes, against 161 for former 2nd District incumbent August Richter, who had served as a Democrat but was running as an Independent in a year when most Democrats were part of the Reform Party coalition. Hamilton was assigned to the standing committee on engrossed bills, and the joint committee on printing. He was not a candidate for re-election, and was succeeded by fellow Reformer Peter Fagg.

In 1876, he was elected as a Democrat to his old seat, garnering 1,194 votes, against 921 for Republican Christian Widule (the incumbent, Fagg, was not a candidate for re-election). He was assigned to the committee on ways and means; and was elected secretary of the Assembly's Democratic caucus and of the joint Democratic caucus. He was not a candidate for re-election, and was succeeded by "Reform Democrat" John C. Dick.

He should not be confused with Joseph B. Hamilton of Neenah, Wisconsin, who served in the Wisconsin State Senate in the 1860s and 1880s. He died on March 16, 1912.
