= Ferdinand Regelsberger =

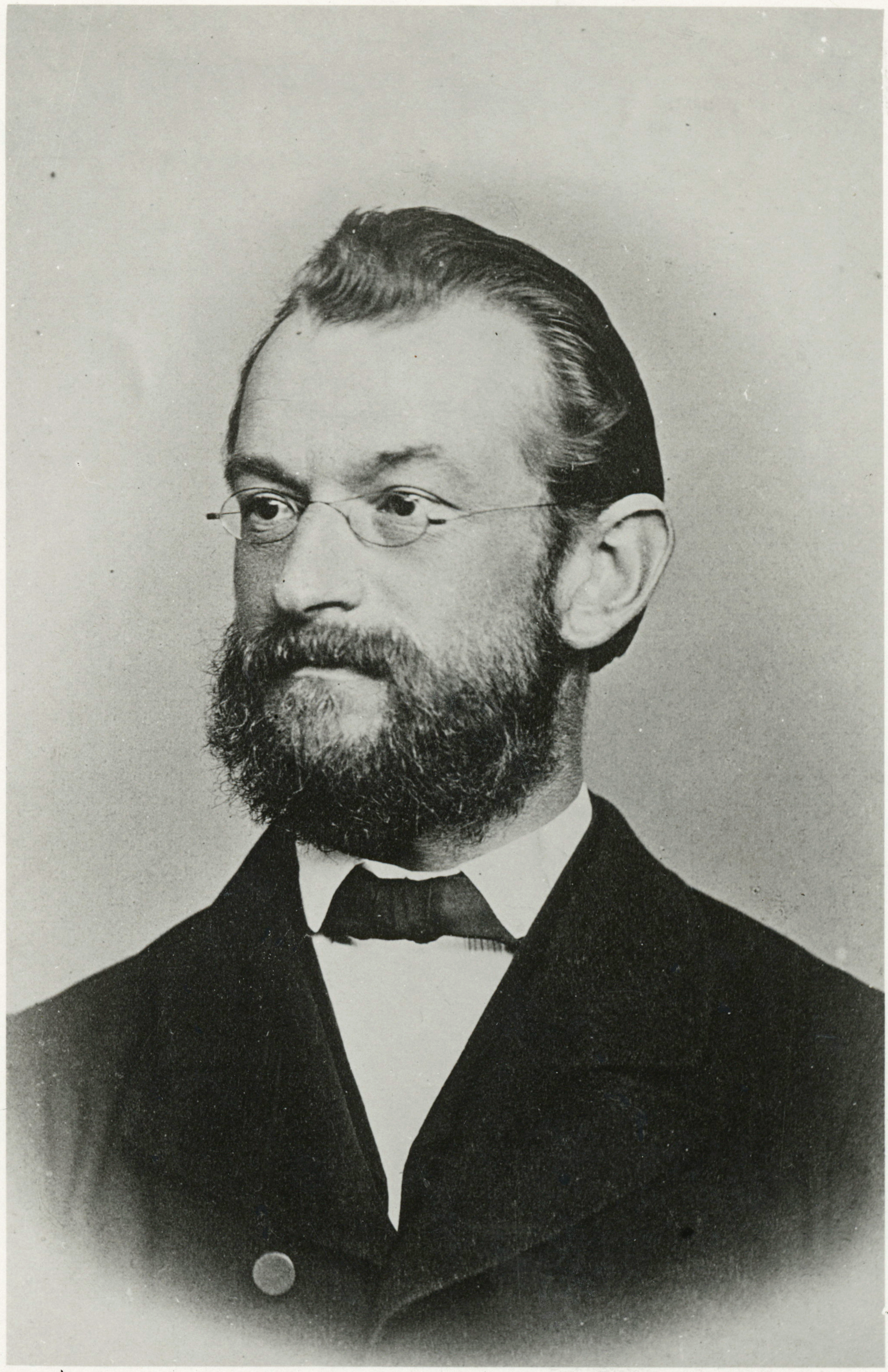
- Born: Aloys Ferdinand Friedrich Waldemar Regelsberger; 10 September 1831; Gunzenhausen
- Died: 2 March 1911 (aged 79); Göttingen
- Occupation: jurist
- Title: professor
- Spouse: Anna Regelsberger

Ferdinand Friedrich Waldemar Regelsberger (10 September 1831 – 2 March 1911) was a German jurist. Regelsberger was born in Gunzenhausen. He studied law at the University of Erlangen and at the University of Zurich. He was in 1868 President of the University of Zurich. Regelsberger died in Göttingen.
