= Robert Kirstein =

German philologist

Robert Kirstein (born 4 June 1967) is a German classical philologist and professor of Latin philology at the Eberhard Karls Universität Tübingen.

== Life ==
Born in Bonn, Kirstein studied Classical Philology and Protestant Theology at the Rheinische Friedrich-Wilhelms-Universität Bonn, Westfälische Wilhelms-Universität and Oxford University (Christ Church College) from 1987 to 1993. He was a scholarship holder of the Studienstiftung des Deutschen Volkes. After his state examination, he worked from 1996 to 1997 as a research assistant at the Institute for Classical Philology at the University of Münster, where he completed his dissertation Paulinus Nolanus. Carmen 17. text, introduction and commentary. He then went to the University of Illinois for a year as a William Abbott Oldfather Foundation. He was able to extend his stay by two years with a Feodor Lynen Fellowship from the Alexander von Humboldt Foundation.

After his return from the US, Kirstein worked as a research assistant at the University of Münster, where in 2006 he wrote Junge Hirten und alte Fischer. Die Gedichte 20, 21 und 27 des Corpus Theocriteum (published in 2007). The habilitation was followed by various teaching posts at the Westfälische Wilhelms-Universität Münster, Universität Hamburg and Otto-Friedrich-Universität Bamberg, accompanied by several research stays at the Fondation Hardt pour l'étude de l'antiquité classique in Vandœuvres (Switzerland).

In 2011, shortly after his appointment as associate professor at the University of Münster, Kirstein took over the chair of Jürgen Leonhardt at the University of Tübingen. At the end of 2018, he was appointed full professor there and has since been full professor of Latin philology at the Eberhard Karls University of Tübingen. In 2017, he founded the interdisciplinary "Working Group Narrative Dynamics in Latin Literature". Since 2017, he has been a member of the Tübingen Research Training Group 1808 Ambiguity - Production and Reception.

Kirstein's research interests include literature in Hellenistic-Roman times, Ovid, the ancient epigram, Latin Late Antiquity, and the history of reception and scholarship, especially of the 19th and 20th centuries. In recent years, he has also been concerned with the application of structuralist, especially narratological models to ancient texts.

== Publications ==
- Paulinus Nolanus, Carmen 17. Text, Einleitung und Kommentar, Basel: Schwabe & Co. 2000 (Chrêsis. Die Methode der Kirchenväter im Umgang mit der antiken Kultur 8), ISBN 3-7965-1374-3
- Junge Hirten und alte Fischer. Die Gedichte 27, 20 und 21 des Corpus Theocriteum, Berlin / New York: de Gruyter 2007 (text and comments 29), ISBN 978-3-11-019224-7.
- Der geniale Wildling. U. von Wilamowitz-Moellendorff und Max Fränkel. Briefwechsel 1874–1878. 1900. Edited with commentary by W. M. Calder III and R. Kirstein, Göttingen 1999 (Nachrichten der Göttinger Akademie der Wissenschaften. Philological-historical Class 1999, 5).
- Aus dem Freund ein Sohn. Theodor Mommsen und Ulrich von Wilamowitz-Moellendorff. Briefwechsel 1872–1903. Edited and commented by W. M. Calder III and R. Kirstein, 2 vols., Hildesheim: Weidmann 2003, ISBN 3-615-00285-7.
- Wissenstransfer und Translation. Edited by A. Gil and R. Kirstein, St. Ingbert: Röhrig Universitätsverlag 2015 (Hermeneutik und Kreativität 3), ISBN 978-3-86110-556-5.
- Ficta et Facta. Reflexionen über den Realgehalt der Dinge bei Ovid, in Zeitschrift für Ästhetik und Allgemeine Kunstwissenschaft 60, 2015, 257–277.
- Klassik versus Klassik. Iphigenie bei Goethe und Euripides, in Emotions in Antiquity. Blessing or Curse? edited by M. A. Harder and K. Stöppelkamp, Leuven: Peeters 2016, 51–75.
- Gewaltzeiten. Violence in an Erotic Landscape: Catullus, Caesar and the Borders of Empire and Existence (carm. 11), in Cultural Perceptions of Violence in the Hellenistic World. Edited by Lara O’Sullivan, Luca Asmont, Michael Champion, Routledge 2017, 191–207.
- Von Mücken und Musen oder Freundschaft in schwieriger Zeit. Reuchlins Briefwechsel in den Tübinger Jahren 1521–1522, in Ein Vater neuer Zeit. Reuchlin, die Juden und die Reformation. Edited by Jörg Robert, Evamarie Blattner, Wiebke Ratzeburg, Tübingen 2017, 80–91.
- Machtverhältnisse und Wortspiele. Yōko Tawada und Plinius der Jüngere, in Sprach-Spiel-Kunst. Ein Dialog zwischen Wissenschaft und Praxis. Edited by Esme Winter-Froemel, Berlin: de Gruyter 2019 (The Dynamics of Wordplay 8), 247–262.
- New Borders of Fiction? Callimachean Aitiology as Narrative Device in Ovid’s Metamorphoses, in Callimachus Revisited. New Perspectives in Callimachean Scholarship. Edited by J. J. Klooster, M. A. Harder, R. F. Regtuit, G. C. Wakker, Leuven: Peeters 2019, 193–220 (Hellenistica Groningana 24).
- Narratology and Classics (with Andreas Abele and Hans-Peter Nill), in Structures of Epic Poetry, Vol. I: Foundations. Edited by Christiane Reitz and Simone Finkmann, Berlin de Gruyter 2019, 99–113.
