= John C. Dick =

American politician

John C. Dick (January 12, 1824 – December 19, 1910) was a United States insurance agent and executive from Milwaukee, Wisconsin who served on the city council and as a member of the Wisconsin State Assembly.

== Background ==
Dick was born in the Kingdom of Bavaria on January 12, 1824, son of Andrew and Wilhelmina Dick, and received a limited common school education. He emigrated to the United States, and settled in New York City in August 1846. Dissatisfied, in 1847, he moved to Milwaukee, arriving there on May 13. He worked as a clerk and a traveling salesman.

== Return to Bavaria, and then back to Milwaukee ==
Having decided not to stay in the United States, He went back to Bavaria in 1852, but ended up returning to Milwaukee after six months. He married Margaret Salfner, of Bavaria on January 12, 1853; the couple would have thirteen children together in years to come. From 1853 to 1855 he worked in the saloon business. In 1855 he became a notary public, and in 1856 went into the insurance business, where he was to spend the rest of his career. He worked as a fire insurance agent, and eventually became a director and vice-president of the Milwaukee Mechanics' Mutual Insurance Company.

== Public office ==
In 1856 and 1857 he served on the Milwaukee Common Council as alderman from his ward. In 1877 he was elected as a "Reform Democrat" to the 2nd Milwaukee County district (the 2nd Ward of the City of Milwaukee) of the State Assembly. He won 652 votes, to 448 for former Liberal Reform assemblyman Jacob Sander, running as an Independent, and 388 for Socialist George Tyre. (The incumbent, Democrat Joseph Hamilton, was not a candidate for re-election.) He was assigned to the standing committee on insurance, banks and banking. He was not a candidate for re-election in 1878, and was succeeded by Republican Christian Widule. In 1879 he sought to return to his old seat, but was defeated 475 to 958 by Republican Otto Laverrenz.

== Personal life ==
Dick was active in several fraternal orders: the Ancient Order of Druids (he was a delegate to their 1874 national convention, and was elected as a national trustee in 1886); Freemasons; German Order of Harugari; and the Sons of Hermann. He became known as "thoroughly conversant with the early history of Milwaukee;" in 1856 he had been one of the pallbearers at the funeral of Solomon Juneau.

He died in Milwaukee on December 19, 1910.
