= August Richter =

August Richter may refer to:

- August Richter (politician) (1831–1907), American real estate agent and member of the Wisconsin State Assembly
- August Gottlieb Richter (1742–1812), German surgeon
