= Charles Fingado =

American politician

Member of the Wisconsin State Assembly
- In office 1882

Personal details
- Born: December 23, 1841 Lahr, Grand Duchy of Baden
- Died: 1901 (aged 59–60) Wauwatosa, Wisconsin, U.S.
- Party: Republican
- Spouse: Amalia Walther (m. 1865–1901)
- Children: 6

Charles Fingado (December 23, 1841 – 1901) was a Grand Duchy of Baden-born American politician who served as a member of the Wisconsin State Assembly in 1882.

== Early life ==
Fingado was born on December 23, 1841, in Lahr, Grand Duchy of Baden. He moved to Milwaukee, Wisconsin, in 1854 and to Wauwatosa, Wisconsin, in 1856.

== Career ==
During the American Civil War, Fingado served with the 24th Wisconsin Volunteer Infantry Regiment and participated in the Battle of Perryville. Fingado was a member of the Wisconsin State Assembly in 1882. Previously, he held positions in Wauwatosa, serving as treasurer in 1868, supervisor from 1876 to 1880 and chairman of the board in 1880. He was a Republican.

== Personal life ==
On April 23, 1865, Fingado married Amalia Walther. They had six children. He died in 1901 in Wauwatosa, where he was also buried.
