= Otto Willi Gail =

German science journalist and author (1896–1956)

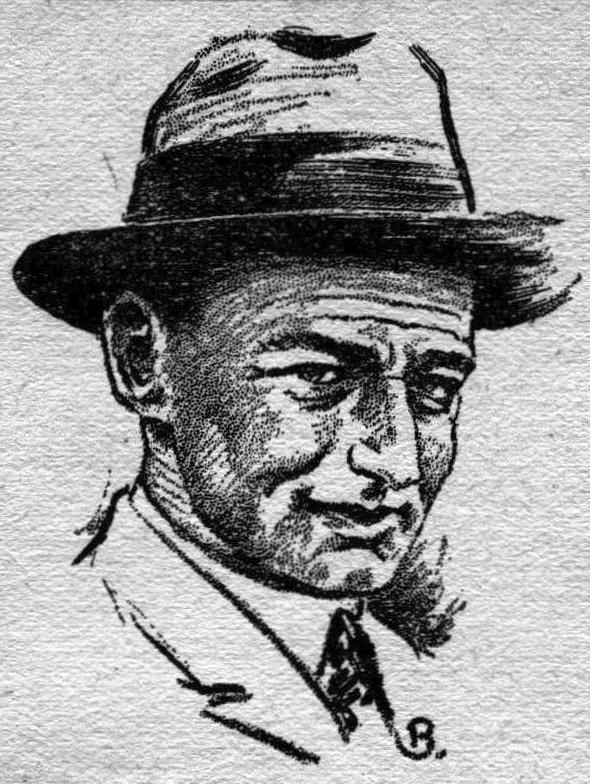
- Otto Willi Gail, as depicted in the Fall 1929 issue of Science Wonder Quarterly
- Born: 18 July 1896; Gunzenhausen, Germany
- Died: 29 March 1956 (aged 59); Munich, Germany
- Occupations: Journalist, author
- Writing career
- Genres: Science, science fiction
- Notable works: Der Schuß ins All, Hans Hardts Mondfahrt

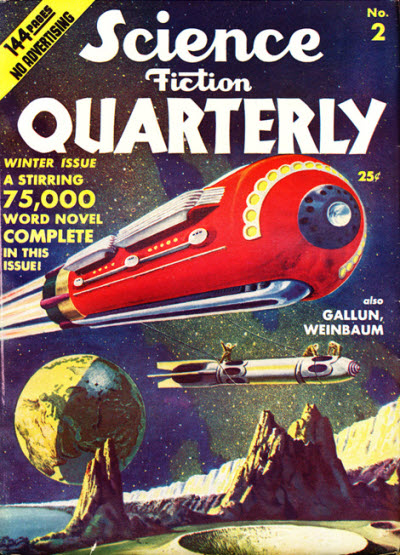
Gail's 1925 novel The Shot into Infinity was reprinted in the Winter 1940 issue of Science Fiction Quarterly

Otto Willi Gail (18 July 1896 – 29 March 1956) was a German science journalist and author.

Gail was born in Gunzenhausen, in the Middle Franconia region of Bavaria, Germany. He studied electrical engineering and physics at the Technical University of Munich. He worked for newspapers and radio broadcasting and wrote non-fiction books about physics, astronomy and space travel. He also wrote science fiction novels to delight the youth for these themes. He had good relations to the German space pioneers Max Valier and Hermann Oberth. As a result of these relationships he acquired special knowledge that influenced his books and gave them detailed realism. His novels were translated into American English and influenced early American utopian literature. He died in Munich.

R. D. Mullen noted that Der Schuß ins All is "justly famous for the realistic detail with which it depicts the construction of a rocket ship, its launching into space, and the experiences of its crew." Der Schuß ins All first appeared in English translation under the title The Shot into Infinity in the fall 1929 issue of Gernsback's magazine Science Wonder Quarterly.

Of (the English version of) Hans Hardts Mondfahrt, Robert Godwin writes "this novel for young adults is an accurate mirror of many of the space travel concepts that have been discussed by pre-war European experts," and continues, "Otto Willi Gail was one of the most popular science fiction authors in Germany during the early 20th century." Wonder Stories compared By Rocket to the Moon to the work of Jules Verne, saying "The style is easy and rapid, and the story moves along with facility".

== Novels ==
- Der Schuß ins All (1925) (translated as The Shot into Infinity)
- Der Stein vom Mond (1926) (translated as The Stone From the Moon)
- Hans Hardts Mondfahrt (1928) (translated as By Rocket to the Moon)
- Die blaue Kugel (1929)
- Der Herr der Wellen (1949)

== Non-fiction books ==
- Mit Raketenkraft ins Weltenall (1928)
- Wir plaudern uns durch die Physik (1931)
- Der Griff nach dem Atom (1947)
- Ebbe und Flut (1947)
- Physik der Weltraumfahrt (1948)
- Was weißt du von der Welt? (20 booklets, Bayerischer Schulbuch-Verlag, München since 1947)
