= Orlando Ellsworth =

19th century American politician

Member of the Wisconsin State Assembly from the Milwaukee 9th district
- In office January 4, 1858 – January 3, 1859
- Preceded by: James DeNoon Reymert
- Succeeded by: Edward Hasse

Personal details
- Born: January 13, 1813 Otsego County, New York, U.S.
- Died: June 27, 1872 Iowa Falls, Iowa, U.S.
- Resting place: Union Cemetery, Iowa Falls, Iowa
- Party: Republican
- Spouse: Almira Shaw Hinds (m. 1841–1854)
- Children: Eugene Stafford Ellsworth; (b. 1848; died 1907)
- Parent: Stukely Ellsworth (father)

Military service
- Allegiance: United States
- Branch/service: United States Volunteers; Union Army
- Years of service: 1862–1863
- Rank: Captain, USV
- Unit: 24th Reg. Wis. Vol. Infantry
- Battles/wars: American Civil War: Battle of Perryville; Battle of Stones River

Orlando Ellsworth (January 13, 1813 – June 27, 1872) was an American farmer, Republican politician, and Wisconsin pioneer. He served one term in the Wisconsin State Assembly, representing southern Milwaukee County, and was a Union Army officer in the American Civil War.

== Biography ==
Orlando Ellsworth was born and raised in Otsego County, New York. He traveled west, arriving at Milwaukee County, Wisconsin Territory, in 1836. He established himself on farm land just south of the village of Milwaukee, which would (in 1838) become the town of Lake.

He associated with the Whig Party, which put him in the political minority in Wisconsin in those early years. Nevertheless, he was elected town clerk in Lake. After the Republican Party was established, he became a member of the new party and was elected, in 1857, to the Wisconsin State Assembly, representing Milwaukee County's 9th Assembly district (at the time comprising the towns of Lake, Oak Creek, and Franklin). He subsequently served as chairman of the Lake town board, in 1860.

== Civil War service ==
After the outbreak of the American Civil War, Ellsworth assisted in raising a company of volunteers for the Union Army. Ellsworth was elected captain of the company, which was enrolled as Company K in the 24th Wisconsin Infantry Regiment. The 24th Wisconsin Infantry left the state in September 1862 en route to Kentucky, for service in the western theater of the war. They arrived at Louisville, Kentucky, on September 20, where they were assigned to the division of General Philip Sheridan, in the Army of the Ohio, under General Charles Champion Gilbert.

On October 1, they left Louisville in pursuit of Confederate general Braxton Bragg, who had been attacking through the border states of Tennessee and Kentucky on his Kentucky campaign. The Union army encountered elements of Bragg's army near the city of Perryville, Kentucky, on October 7, and the next morning, the Battle of Perryville began. The main action of the battle occurred northwest of Perryville, the 24th Wisconsin, with its division, was located south of there. They engaged in defense of a cannon battery until the afternoon, when Bragg sent a small force against them—not knowing the strength of the Union position. The small Confederate attack was easily repulsed.

After the battle, the 24th Wisconsin Infantry, with Sheridan's division, were reorganized into the right wing of the Army of the Cumberland, under General Alexander McDowell McCook. The Union resumed their pursuit of Bragg in December 1862, and engaged him near Murfreesboro, Tennessee, in the Battle of Stones River. Their division formed the left end of the right wing of the Union line. Their regiment supported a cannon battery on December 30, and remained lying in position overnight, without campfires, and suffered in the extreme cold. The Confederates attacked at dawn on the right flank of the Union line, and sent the entire wing into retreat. They managed to reform and stabilize their line by 10am, and the 24th Wisconsin Infantry was assigned to defend another cannon battery for the remainder of the battle.

They spent the remainder of the Winter camped near Murfreesboro. Ellsworth fell ill shortly after the Battle of Stones River and was forced to resign due to disability in January 1863.

== Personal life and family ==
Ellsworth's father, Stukely Ellsworth, was a prominent politician in the area and served several years in the New York State Legislature. His older brother Waterman Ellsworth also served in the New York State Assembly.

Orlando Ellsworth married Almira Shaw Hinds in 1841. They had one child together, Eugene Stafford Ellsworth, before her death in 1854. Eugene joined his father in the 24th Wisconsin Infantry and was drummer boy for the company. He also suffered illness and resigned in 1863. Eugene Ellsworth went on to become a highly successful banker and investor in Iowa Falls, Iowa, and is the namesake of Ellsworth Community College.

== Lawsuit ==
Shortly after his return from the war, Ellsworth was accused of "breach of promise" by a woman named Margaret Gomber (or Gruber or Guniber). After immigrating to the United States from Germany, she had gone to live and work as a servant at the Ellsworth family home in 1852, when she was sixteen years old. After the death of Ellsworth's wife, the two had been involved in a sexual relationship under the promise that they would eventually marry. After four aborted pregnancies, Gomber gave birth to a child on her fifth pregnancy, and the child was roughly a year old when she filed charges in 1863. Ellsworth fled the state shortly after the complaint was filed, and a jury eventually awarded Gruber damages of $5,000 ($110,000 adjusted for inflation to 2021). Ellsworth had transferred his valuable farm to a third party, but Gomber was eventually able to collect.

Wisconsin State Assembly
Preceded by James DeNoon Reymert	Member of the Wisconsin State Assembly from the Milwaukee 9th district January 4, 1858 – January 3, 1859	Succeeded by Edward Hasse
