= George A. Abert =

19th century American politician

Member of the Wisconsin Senate from the 7th district
- In office January 1877 – January 1879
- Preceded by: George E. Bryant
- Succeeded by: Edwin Hyde

Member of the Wisconsin State Assembly
- In office January 1893 – January 1895
- Preceded by: Charles H. Anson
- Succeeded by: Edward C. Notbohm
- Constituency: Milwaukee 7th district
- In office January 1882 – January 1885
- Preceded by: Otto Laverrenz
- Succeeded by: George Poppert
- Constituency: Milwaukee 2nd district

Personal details
- Born: October 22, 1840 Milwaukee, Wisconsin, U.S.
- Died: March 27, 1918 (aged 77) Milwaukee, Wisconsin, U.S.
- Resting place: Forest Home Cemetery, Milwaukee
- Party: Democratic
- Spouse: Anna Marie Schmidtner (died 1911)
- Children: Louise Anna (Godejahn) (b. 1877; died 1964); Adeline (Gaffney) (b. 1878; died 1918); George Gideon Abert (b. 1881; died 1951); Augusta (Wagner) (b. 1889; died 1910)
- Parent: George Abert (father)
- Occupation: Manufacturer, businessman

George Ackerman Abert (October 22, 1840 – March 27, 1918) was an American manufacturer, businessman, and Democratic politician. He was a member of the Wisconsin State Senate and Assembly, representing Milwaukee.

== Early life ==
Abert was born on October 22, 1840, in Milwaukee, Wisconsin, the first of eight children born to Louisa (née Ackerman; 1818–1889), a native of Bavaria, and George Abert Sr. (1817–1890), a native of Alsace, France. He attended the common schools in the area. He was an iron founder and machine manufacturer by trade.

== Political career ==
Abert served as a Democratic member of the State Senate from 1877 to 1878. In 1879, he was the city commissioner of public works. He was a member of the State Assembly twice, serving from 1882 to 1883 and from 1893 to 1894.
