= Jacob Sander =

American cattle dealer and politician from Wisconsin (1828–1904)

Jacob Sander (1828–1904) was an American cattle dealer from Milwaukee, Wisconsin who served a single term as a Liberal Reform Party member of the Wisconsin State Assembly.

He was born December 3, 1828, in Dexheim in the Grand Duchy of Hesse. He received a common school education, came to Wisconsin in 1849 and settled in Milwaukee, where he became a dealer in cattle.

== Public office ==
He had held no public office before being elected as an independent candidate in 1872 from Milwaukee County's 2nd Assembly district (the 2nd Ward of the City of Milwaukee) with 796 votes, to 572 for Democratic incumbent George Abert. He affiliated himself with the Reform Party, a coalition of Democrats, reform and Liberal Republicans, and Grangers which formed in 1873. He was assigned to the standing committee on assessment and collection of taxes.

He did not run for re-election in 1873, and was succeeded by fellow Reformer Joseph Hamilton.

In 1877, with the Reform Party having folded, Sander ran for the 2nd District seat once more as an independent, receiving 448 votes to 652 for "Reform Democrat" John C. Dick and 388 for Socialist George Tyre; and in 1881 as a Republican against old rival George Abert, losing with 714 votes to 757 for Abert.
