= Günter Heimbeck =

German–Namibian professor of mathematics

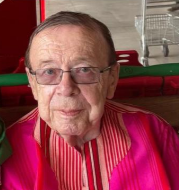
- Heimbeck in 2024
- Born: 23 June 1946; Germany
- Died: 20 October 2025 (aged 79); Namibia
- Education: University of Würzburg
- Known for: Heimbeck Planes
- Scientific career
- Fields: Mathematician
- Workplaces: University of Würzburg; University of the Witwatersrand; University of Namibia

Günter Heimbeck (born 23 June 1946 in Gunzenhausen, Germany, died 20 October 2025 in Windhoek) was a German–Namibian professor of mathematics. His particular research interest was geometry; the Heimbeck Planes are named for him. Heimbeck probably was the first and only Namibian scholar to have a scientific sub-discipline carry his name.

Heimbeck studied mathematics at University of Würzburg from 1965. He completed his PhD in 1974, and his habilitation in 1981. He then became lecturer at his alma mater. In 1985 Heimbeck emigrated to South Africa, where he taught at the University of the Witwatersrand in Johannesburg. In 1987 he took up a professorship for mathematics at the University of Namibia. Heimbeck was advisor to the Namibian Ministry of Education. Heimbeck died in Windhoek on 20 October 2025.
