= Thomas Toohey =

American Civil War officer (1835–1918)

John S. Durham
- Born: January 1, 1835; New York City
- Died: November 19, 1918 (aged 83)
- Military career
- Allegiance: United States; Union
- Branch: United States Army; Union Army
- Service years: 1862 - 1865
- Rank: First Sergeant
- Unit: 24th Wisconsin Volunteer Infantry Regiment
- Conflicts: American Civil War
- Awards: Medal of Honor

Thomas Toohey (January 1, 1835 – November 19, 1918) served in the Union Army during the American Civil War. He received the Medal of Honor.

Toohey was born on January 1, 1835, in New York City. He joined the 24th Wisconsin Infantry from Milwaukee, Wisconsin in August 1862, and mustered out in June 1865. He died on November 19, 1918.

== Medal of Honor citation ==
His award citation reads:

For gallantry in action on 30 November 1864, while serving with Company F, 24th Wisconsin Infantry, in action at Franklin, Tennessee. Sergeant Toohey voluntarily assisting in working guns of battery near right of the regiment after nearly every man had left them, the fire of the enemy being hotter at this than at any other point on the line.

== See also ==
- List of Medal of Honor recipients
- List of American Civil War Medal of Honor recipients: T–Z
