= Ludwig Eichrodt =

German poet and dramatist

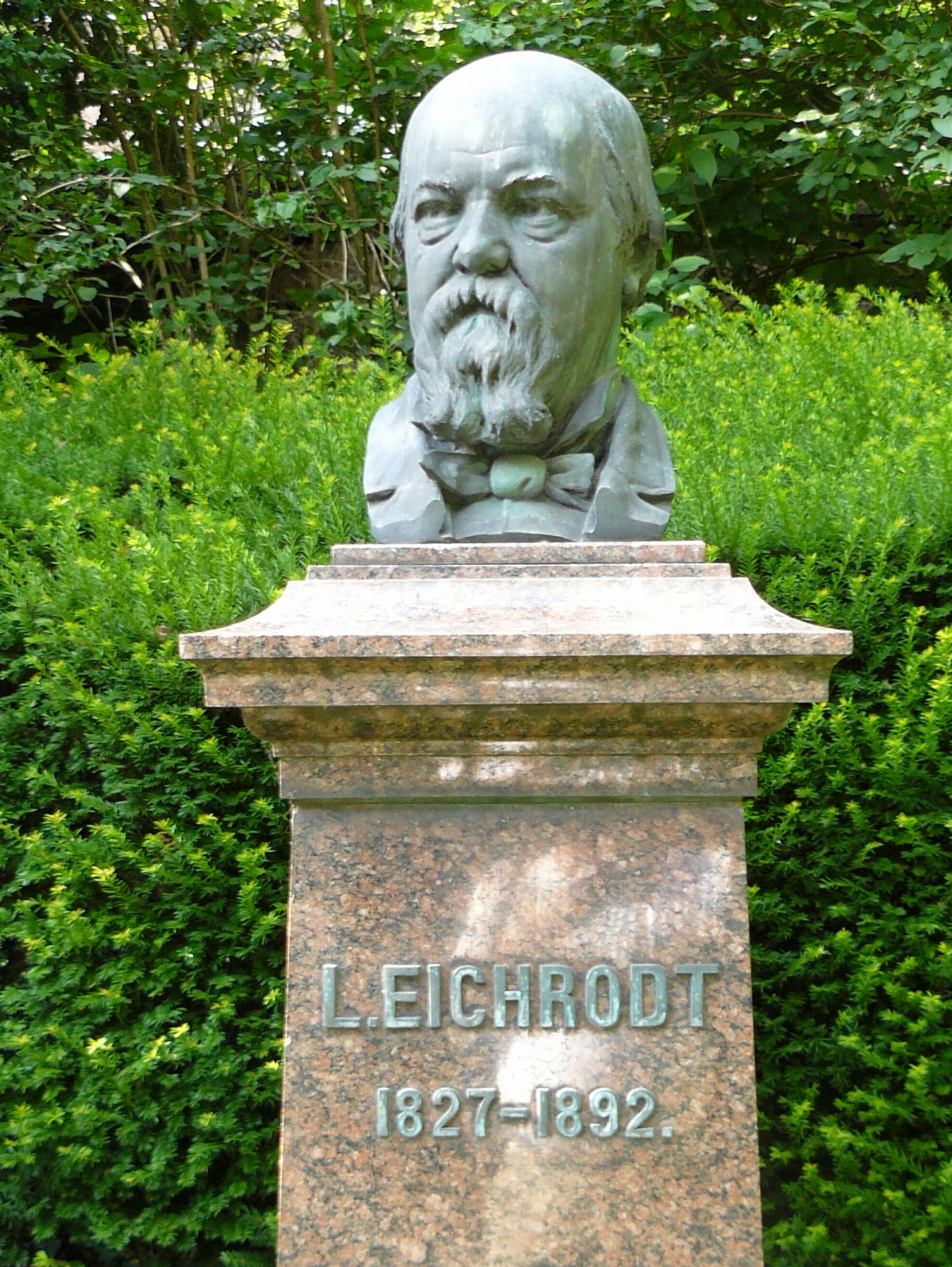
Ludwig Eichrodt

Ludwig Eichrodt (February 2, 1827, Durlach bei Karlsruhe – February 2, 1892, Lahr) was a German poet and dramatist.

== Biography ==
Ludwig Eichrodt was the son of Ludwig Friedrich Eichrodt (1798-1844), an officer, and Elisabeth (née Joos, 1809-1891) Eichrodt. He studied at Heidelberg and Freiburg and published in 1848 in Fliegende Blätter his comic songs, “Wanderlust,” which had great popularity.

== Literary works ==
- Gedichte in allerlei Humoren (Stuttgart 1853)
- Schneiderbüchlein (anonymous with H. Goll, Stuttgart 1853)
- Leben und Liebe, poems (Frankfurt 1856)
- Die Pfalzgrafen, dramatic poem (Lahr 1859)
- Deutsches Knabenbuch; Weltruhm in Reimsprüchen (Lahr 1865)
- Alboin, dramatic poem (Bühl 1865)
- Rhein-schwäbisch, poem in middle-Baden dialect (Karlsruhe 1869, 2. Aufl. 1873)
- Lyrischer Kehraus (Straßburg 1869, 2 Teile)
- Lyrische Karikaturen, anthology (Straßburg 1869)
- Biedermeiers Liederlust (Straßburg 1870)
- Melodien, songs (Stuttgart 1875)
- Hortus dellclarum, humorous anthology (Lahr 1876-80, 6 Teile)
- Gold. Sammlung des Ursprünglichen und Genialen in deutscher Lyrik (Leipzig 1882)

His collected works were published in 1890 at Stuttgart.
