= 24th Wisconsin Infantry Regiment =

Union Army infantry regiment

- Flag of Wisconsin
- Active: August 15, 1862 – June 10, 1865
- Country: United States
- Allegiance: Union
- Branch: Infantry
- Size: Regiment
- Engagements: American Civil War: Battle of Perryville; Battle of Stones River; Battle of Chickamauga; Chattanooga campaign; Battle of Resaca; Battle of Franklin; Battle of Nashville

Commanders
- Colonel: Charles H. Larrabee
- Lt. Colonel: Elisha C. Hibbard
- Colonel: Theodore S. West
- Lt. Colonel: Arthur MacArthur Jr.

The 24th Wisconsin Infantry Regiment was a volunteer infantry regiment that served in the Union Army during the American Civil War.

== Service ==
The 24th Wisconsin was organized at Milwaukee, Wisconsin, and mustered into Federal service August 15, 1862. The regiment's flag was provided by citizens of Madison, who had promised it to the first regiment to reach full recruitment.

The regiment served under generals Grant and Sherman and was engaged in the battles Stone's River, Chickamauga, Franklin, Nashville, Missionary Ridge and Chattanooga.

The regiment was mustered out on June 10, 1865, at Nashville, Tennessee.

The regimental adjutant was Arthur MacArthur Jr. (later rose to Lieutenant General and father of General Douglas MacArthur). By the end of the war, MacArthur had risen to second in command of the regiment with the rank of colonel at the age of only 19. On September 5, 1912, Lieutenant General Arthur MacArthur died while addressing his old unit. The original 24th Wisconsin Infantry United States flag was then draped over the former commanding officer and thus the tradition of burial flags was born. MacArthur also coined the Wisconsin state slogan when he cried "On Wisconsin" as he led his men up Missionary Ridge at the battle of Chattanooga, a feat for which he would later receive the Medal of Honor.

Another officer in the regiment was 1st Lieutenant John L. Mitchell. Mitchell later became a United States Senator and was the father of Brigadier General Billy Mitchell - an outspoken and controversial advocate of air power. By great coincidence, Arthur MacArthur's son Douglas was a juror for the court martial of John Mitchell's son Billy in 1925.

== Casualties ==
The 24th Wisconsin suffered 8 officers and 103 enlisted men killed in action or who later died of their wounds, plus another 3 officers and 87 enlisted men who died of disease, for a total of 201 fatalities.

== Commanders ==
- Colonel Charles H. Larrabee (August 22, 1862 – August 27, 1863) fell ill after the Battle of Perryville and later resigned. Before the war he had been a member of Congress and justice of the Wisconsin Supreme Court.
- Lt. Colonel Elisha C. Hibbard (December 24, 1862 – March 7, 1863) was acting commander of the regiment while Colonel Larrabee was absent at Nashville.
- Colonel Theodore S. West (March 7, 1863 – May 12, 1865) was acting commander until Larrabee's resignation. He mustered out with the regiment and received an honorary brevet to brigadier general.
- Lt. Colonel Arthur MacArthur Jr. (May 12, 1865 – June 10, 1865) mustered out with the regiment.

== Notable people ==
- Byron D. L. Abert, son of George Abert, was enlisted in Co. E and rose to the rank of first sergeant, and was then commissioned first lieutenant of that company in 1864. After the war he was elected superintendent of the poor in Milwaukee.
- Louis T. Battell, father of William P. Battell, was 1st lieutenant of Co. K and later captain of Co. D.
- Henry W. Belden, son of Philo Belden and father of Ellsworth Burnett Belden, was enlisted in Co. A and wounded at Chickamauga. He was later a captain in the 37th Wisconsin Infantry Regiment.
- Adolph Biermann was enlisted in Co. I. He later served as the 5th Minnesota State Auditor.
- Edward Reed Blake was enlisted in Co. H and rose to the rank of sergeant. After the war, he was a Wisconsin legislator.
- Lucien Chase, son of Enoch Chase, was enlisted in Co. B, died due to disease after Perryville.
- William Disch was enlisted in Co. K and mustered out with the regiment. After the war, he was a Wisconsin legislator.
- Orlando Ellsworth was captain of Co. K, resigned due to illness after Stones River.
- Charles Fingado was enlisted in Co. E and discharged due to disability in 1863. After the war, he was a Wisconsin legislator.
- Adoniram J. Holmes was enlisted in Co. D and later 2nd lieutenant in Co. F and 1st lieutenant in Co. K. After the war, he was elected to U.S. Congress from Iowa, and was later Sergeant at Arms of the United States House of Representatives.
- Richard W. Hubbell was sergeant in Co. I and later major in the 1st Wisconsin Heavy Artillery Regiment. After the war, he was a Wisconsin legislator and judge.
- Henry C. Koch was enlisted in Co. B, but later detailed as a draftsman on the staff of general Philip Sheridan. After the war, he became a prominent architect.
- Arthur MacArthur Jr. was adjutant and later lieutenant colonel of the regiment. He was awarded the Medal of Honor for actions at the Battle of Missionary Ridge. He continued in the U.S. Army after the war and was later Military Governor of the Philippines. He was the father of World War II general Douglas MacArthur.
- John L. Mitchell was 2nd lieutenant in Co. I and later 1st lieutenant in Co. E. After the war, he was elected to the United States House of Representatives and was elected United States Senator from Wisconsin (1893–1899).
- Herman L. Page was the first lieutenant colonel of the regiment, but resigned after recruitment was completed. Before the war, he was the 11th mayor of Milwaukee.
- Duncan Reed was captain of Co. E, dismissed from service in 1863. Before the war he had been president pro tempore of the Wisconsin Senate.
- Henry A. Reed, first lieutenant in Company I. Graduated from the United States Military Academy in 1870, served until 1906, and retired as a brigadier general.
- Thomas Toohey was sergeant and later 1st sergeant in Co. F. He was awarded the Medal of Honor for actions at the Battle of Franklin.

== See also ==
- List of Wisconsin Civil War units
- Wisconsin in the American Civil War
