= George Abert =

Alsatian-American pioneer, manufacturer, and politician

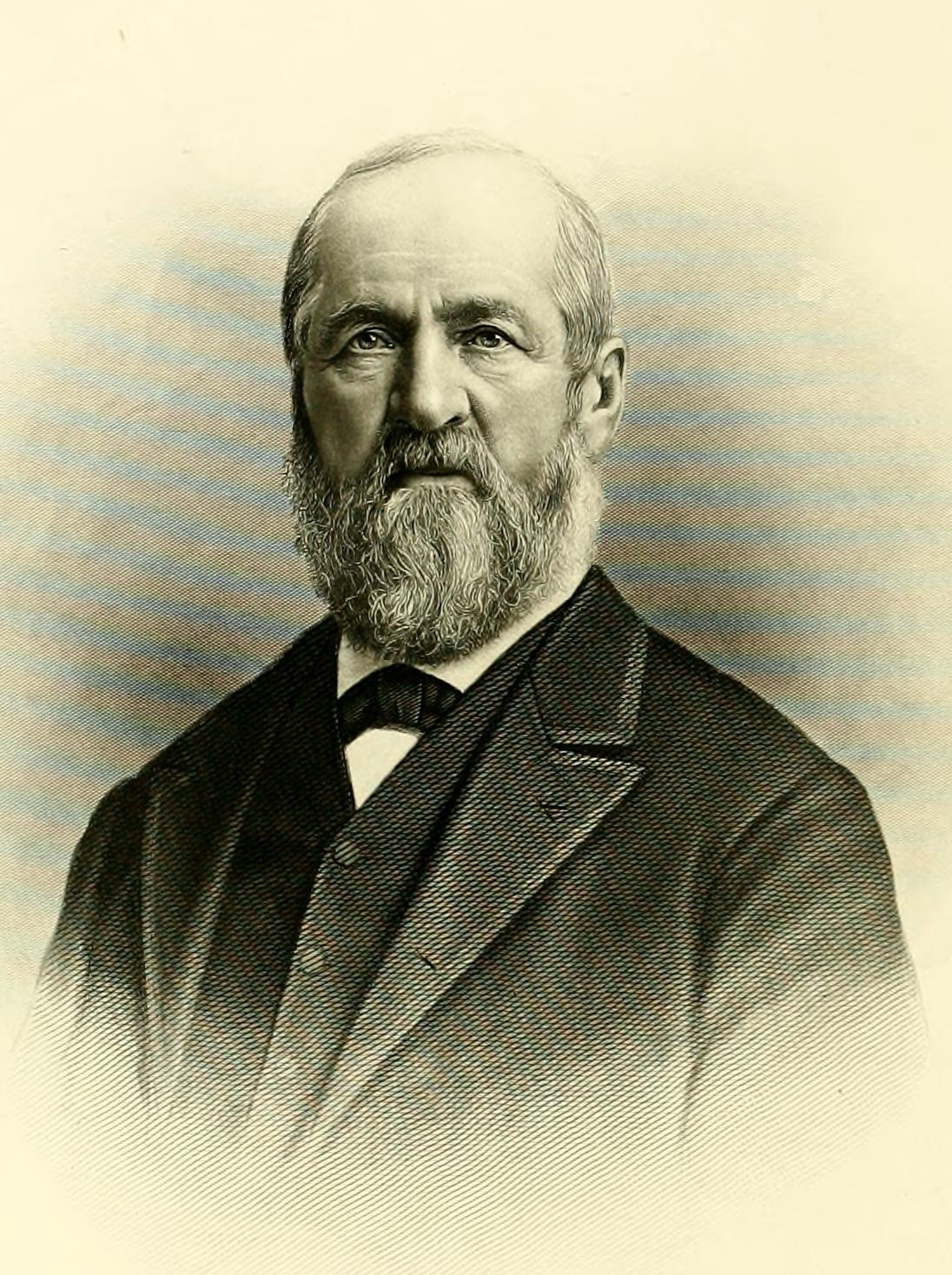
- From History of Milwaukee from its first settlement to the year 1895 (1895)

Member of the Wisconsin State Assembly from the Milwaukee 2nd district
- In office January 10, 1872 – January 8, 1873
- Preceded by: August Richter
- Succeeded by: Jacob Sander
- In office January 8, 1868 – January 11, 1871
- Preceded by: Harrison Carroll Hobart
- Succeeded by: August Richter
- In office January 9, 1861 – January 13, 1864
- Preceded by: Louis A. Schmidtner
- Succeeded by: David Knab

Personal details
- Born: George Gideon Abert; May 10, 1817 Soultz-sous-Forêts, Alsace, France
- Died: October 14, 1890 (aged 73) Milwaukee, Wisconsin, U.S.
- Resting place: Forest Home Cemetery; Milwaukee, Wisconsin
- Party: Democratic
- Spouse: Louisa (Ackerman) Abert (m. 1840; died 1889)
- Children: George A. Abert (b. 1840; died 1918); Byron D. Abert (b. 1841; died 1892); Adeline Louisa (Bertschy) (b. 1846); John B. Abert (b. 1847; died 1916); Emily C. Abert (b. 1849; died 1923); Henry William Abert (b. 1850; died 1887); Charles E. Abert (b. 1855; died 1911); Henriette Louisa Maria (Krekel) (b. 1860; died 1933)
- Profession: Manufacturer; Politician

George Gideon Abert (May 10, 1817 – October 14, 1890) was an immigrant to the United States from Alsace in France, Democratic politician, and Wisconsin pioneer. He was an important figure in the growth and development of the city of Milwaukee, and represented the city for seven terms as a member of the Wisconsin State Assembly in the 1860s and 1870s.

== Early life ==
Abert was born in Soultz-sous-Forêts, Alsace, during the Bourbon Restoration in France. His father owned land in Alsace, but died when George was about ten years old. He went to live with his uncle, Martin, and emigrated with him and his family to the United States in 1829. The landed at New York City, but quickly moved to the town of Lyons, in Wayne County, New York. He worked as a farmhand during the summer and went to school in the winter until age 14, when he decided to set off on his own.

He traveled to Columbus, Ohio, where he was hired as a laborer. He saved his earnings for three years, then, after hearing about new land in the west, journeyed to Milwaukee, in the Wisconsin Territory, going by way of ship from Buffalo, New York.

== Pioneer days in Milwaukee ==
In Milwaukee, he was hired by Byron Kilbourn to assist him in land surveys, laying out roadways from Milwaukee to other early Wisconsin settlements, and various other duties. In 1837, he accompanied Kilbourn to the territorial legislature, being held in Burlington, Iowa—which was then part of the same territory. In 1838, Kilbourn sought a land grant from the United States government for the a proposed "Rock River Canal" to improve transportation between Milwaukee and the Mississippi River. Kilbourn selected Abert to represent his interests in Washington, D.C., traveling there by sled in the winter, and the land was awarded for the canal.

Abert eventually made his own land claim on the Root River. He built a cabin there and lent it out to a tenant, but later found the tenant had abandoned the site. In 1839, he bought a lot in the city of Milwaukee, where he erected a building and housed the first bakery on the west side of the river. In 1843, responding to a demand for pottery in the city, he established a pottery factory and hired a potter to manage it, though this project only lasted a year. Afterward, he largely engaged in general contracting, specializing in road construction and land grading.

== Political career ==
Abert became active in political affairs in the city and state and was a lifelong member of the Democratic Party. He campaigned in opposition to the first proposed constitution of Wisconsin and likely contributed significantly to its rejection by voters in 1846.

When Milwaukee became a city in 1846, Abert was elected to the first city council. He was subsequently elected city railroad commissioner in 1857.

While serving as alderman, he gave shelter to two fugitives from slavery, "Bill Windfree" and his wife. Abert allowed them to live on his land outside the city, but for compensation, Abert asked for Windfree to cut wood and clear land. After a season, Windfree continued on his journey.

He was elected to his first term in the Wisconsin State Assembly in 1860, and was subsequently re-elected in 1861 and 1862. He was then elected to three more terms in 1867, 1868, and 1869, before being elected to a final term in 1871. In all of his legislative service, he represented Milwaukee County's 2nd Assembly district, which through all those years comprised the 2nd ward of the city of Milwaukee.

He was described as a conservative Democrat, and voted in favor of all the war measures requested by the Governor during the American Civil War.

== Business career ==
In 1860, Abert was one of the founders of the German Mutual Fire Insurance Company of Milwaukee and was the first present of the company. He subsequently opened the first iron foundry in the northwest states, along with his sons, in 1865, and used it to manufacture stoves and other hollow-ware. For many years, it was the only such factory west of New York state.

He acquired a large amount of land through his business success, and devoted much of his later years to dealing with his real estate holdings.

His death came on October 14, 1890. He died at his home in Milwaukee, which he had constructed in 1849.

== Personal life ==
George Abert married Louisa Ackerman, a German American immigrant from Bavaria, in July 1840. They had eight children together and enjoyed 71 years of marriage before her death in October 1889. Several of their sons went on to prominence in Milwaukee.

- Their eldest son, George A. Abert, would also become a prominent Democratic politician in Wisconsin, and served in the Wisconsin State Assembly and Senate. He sponsored the act of the legislature which funded the Milwaukee Public Museum.
- Byron D. L. Abert, their second child, enlisted with the 24th Wisconsin Infantry Regiment and served through most of the American Civil War. He received a commission as first lieutenant in 1864. After the war he was elected superintendent of the poor for two terms in the 1870s.
- John B. Abert, their fourth child, enlisted at age 16 and served in the 45th Wisconsin Infantry Regiment during the Civil War. After the war, he operated the family's iron foundry for many years, served as deputy sheriff, and was elected to the Milwaukee city council.

== Electoral history ==
Wisconsin Assembly, Milwaukee 2nd District Election, 1871
Party	Candidate	Votes	%	±%
General Election, November 7, 1871
Democratic	George Abert	569	71.48%	+17.89%
Independent Democrat	August Richter (incumbent)	227	28.52%	
Plurality		342	42.96%	+35.78%
Total votes		796	100.0%	-28.55%
Democratic hold				
