= Stukely Ellsworth =

American politician (1769-1837)

Member of the New York Senate from the 6th district
- In office January 4, 1825 – January 6, 1829
- Preceded by: Farrand Stranahan
- Succeeded by: John F. Hubbard

Member of the New York State Assembly from the Otsego County district
- In office November 7, 1820 – January 1, 1822 Serving with Joshua Babcock, John Blakeley, Caleb Eldred, & David Tripp
- Preceded by: Samuel Caldwell, Seth Chase, Willard Coye, James Hawks, & Henry Ogden
- Succeeded by: John Blakeley, Calvin Brookins, & George Fenno
- In office January 5, 1818 – January 5, 1819 Serving with Joshua Babcock, Nathaniel Fenton, John Moore, & David Tripp
- Preceded by: Henry Albert, William Campbell, Cyrenus Noble, Humphrey Palmer, & Elijah Turner
- Succeeded by: John Blakeley, Seth Chase, Caleb Eldred, Thomas Howes, & William Nichols

Personal details
- Born: September 26, 1769 West Greenwich, Rhode Island, British America
- Died: March 31, 1837 (aged 67) Hartwick, New York, U.S.
- Spouse: Mercy Harrington (m. 1795–1837)
- Children: Leonard Ellsworth^{(b. 1796; died 1842)}; Waterman A. Ellsworth^{(b. 1797; died 1849)}; Stukely S. Ellsworth Jr.^{(b. 1806; died 1881)}; Chester F. Ellsworth^{(b. 1810; died 1877)}; Orlando Ellsworth^{(b. 1813; died 1872)}
- Parents: Judiah Aylworth (father); Rosanna (Edwards) Aylworth (mother)

Stukely Stafford Ellsworth, Sr., (September 26, 1769 – March 31, 1837) was an American politician from New York state. He served two terms in the New York State Assembly, representing Otsego County, and later served in the New York State Senate.

== Biography ==
Stukeley Ellsworth was born September 26, 1769, in West Greenwich, Rhode Island. He was raised and lived most of his life in Otsego County, New York, living first at the town of Laurens, then Hartwick.

He was a justice of the peace and town supervisor before being elected to the New York State Assembly in 1817 and 1820. He served in the 41st and 44th legislative sessions. In 1824, he was elected to a four-year term in the New York State Senate.

He was injured in a stage coach accident during one of his trips to the Senate, and never fully recovered from the injury. He died suddenly while chopping wood at his home on March 31, 1837.

== Personal life and family ==
Stukeley Ellsworth was the 11th child of Judiah Aylworth, who served in the Rhode Island General Assembly in 1776. Stukeley's mother was Judiah's second wife, Rosanna (née Edwards), she had previously been the widow of Stukeley Stafford, who became his namesake.

Judiah Aylworth was a grandson of Arthur Aylsworth, an English settler who emigrated to the Rhode Island Colony in 1681.

Stukeley Ellsworth married Mercy Harrington in 1795. They had eight children. Two of their sons also served in elected office—Waterman Ellsworth served in the New York State Assembly representing Chautauqua County in 1839, and Orlando Ellsworth served in the Wisconsin State Assembly, representing Milwaukee County in 1858.

Stukeley's grandson via his son Orlando was Eugene Stafford Ellsworth, the namesake of Ellsworth Community College in Iowa.

New York State Assembly
Preceded by Henry Albert, William Campbell, Cyrenus Noble, Humphrey Palmer, & Elijah Turner	Member of the New York State Assembly from the Otsego County district January 5, 1818 – January 5, 1819; Served alongside: Joshua Babcock, Nathaniel Fenton, John Moore, & David Tripp	Succeeded by John Blakeley, Seth Chase, Caleb Eldred, Thomas Howes, & William Nichols
Preceded by Samuel Caldwell, Seth Chase, Willard Coye, James Hawks, & Henry Ogden	Member of the New York State Assembly from the Otsego County district November 7, 1820 – January 1, 1822; Served alongside: Joshua Babcock, John Blakeley, Caleb Eldred, & David Tripp	Succeeded by John Blakeley, Calvin Brookins, & George Fenno
New York State Senate
Preceded by Farrand Stranahan	Member of the New York Senate from the 6th district January 4, 1825 – January 6, 1829	Succeeded by John F. Hubbard
