= Lahr =

- City
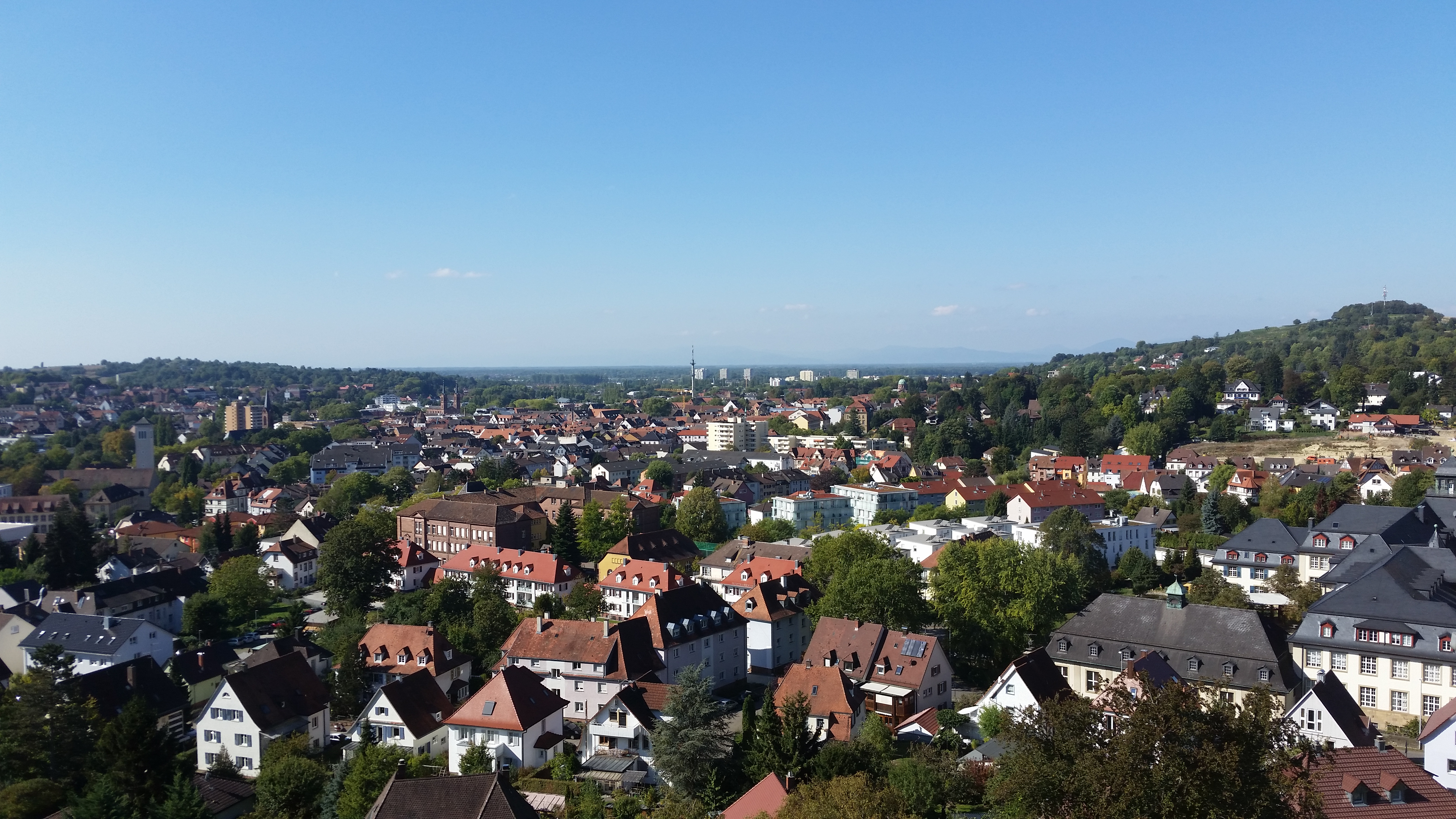
- General view of Lahr

- Coat of arms

- Location of Lahr within Ortenau district
- Interactive map of Lahr
- Location within Germany Location within Baden-Württemberg
- Coordinates: 48°20′N 7°52′E
- Country: Germany
- State: Baden-Württemberg
- Admin. region: Freiburg
- District: Ortenau
- Founded: 1278
- Subdivisions: 7 boroughs

Government
  - Mayor (2019–27): Markus Ibert (Ind.)

Area
  - Total: 69.84 km^{2} (26.97 sq mi)
- Elevation: 170 m (560 ft)

Population (2025-12-31)
  - Total: 51,208
  - Density: 733.2/km^{2} (1,899/sq mi)
- Time zone: UTC+01:00 (CET)
  - Summer (DST): UTC+02:00 (CEST)
- Postal codes: 77901–77933
- Dialling codes: 07821
- Vehicle registration: OG, BH, KEL, LR, WOL
- Website: www.lahr.de

Lahr (officially Lahr/Schwarzwald since 30 September 1978) ((German: [laːɐ̯]); Low Alemannic: Lohr) is a city in western Baden-Württemberg, Germany, approximately 50 km north of Freiburg im Breisgau, 40 km southeast of Strasbourg, and 95 km southwest of Karlsruhe. It is the second largest city in Ortenau (district) after Offenburg, and serves as an intermediate economic centre for the cities and towns of Ettenheim, Friesenheim, Kappel-Grafenhausen, Kippenheim, Mahlberg, Meißenheim, Ringsheim, Rust, Schuttertal, Schwanau and Seelbach.

The population of Lahr passed the 20,000 mark in the mid-1950s. When the new body of Municipal Law for Baden-Württemberg came into effect on April 1, 1956, the city was therefore immediately accorded Große Kreisstadt status. In addition, Lahr cooperates with the town of Kippenheim in administrative matters.

== Geography ==
Lahr is located on the western edge of the Black Forest where the Schutter Valley merges with the Upper Rhine River Plains from the east. The Schutter enters the city from the southeast and runs in a northwesterly direction first through the boroughs of Reichenbach and Kuhbach, then through Lahr (proper) where the Altstadt (historic town centre) is situated on the right bank of the river. It then traverses the borough of Dinglingen where it bends north until it finally leaves the city after traversing the borough of Hugsweier. A canal for emergency relief in times of flooding branches off from the Schutter not far from Dinglingen.

The city of Lahr is made up of Lahr (proper) and the formerly independent communities of Burgheim (merged with Lahr in 1899) and Dinglingen (merged in 1933). Burgheim and Dinglingen have merged with Lahr also in a geographic sense. During the last major district reform in Baden-Württemberg in the 1970s Hugsweier, Kippenheimweiler, Kuhbach, Langenwinkel, Mietersheim, Reichenbach and Sulz joined Lahr as new boroughs.

Several of the boroughs include additional, geographically distinct settlements or neighbourhoods that either have a long history of their own or were created as new developments but with areal boundaries that have not been officially defined. Most of these settlements have only small populations and some have since also merged with their borough in a geographic sense.

Specifically, Brudertal is part of the borough of Kuhbach; Galgenberg, Schutterlindenhof and Waldfrieden are part of Lahr (proper); Eichberg, Gereut, Giesenhof, Langeck, Poche and Schindelhöfe are part of the borough of Reichenbach; and Dammenmühle, Ernethof, Hohberg and Langenhard are part of the borough of Sulz.

=== Neighbouring communities ===
The following cities and towns share a border with Lahr. They are listed clockwise starting from the north: Friesenheim, Seelbach, Kippenheim, Kappel-Grafenhausen and Schwanau.

=== Climate ===
Climate in this area has mild differences between highs and lows, and there is adequate rainfall year-round. The Köppen Climate Classification subtype for this climate is "Cfb" (Oceanic climate).

Climate data for Lahr (CFB Lahr) (1991–2020 normals)
Month	Jan	Feb	Mar	Apr	May	Jun	Jul	Aug	Sep	Oct	Nov	Dec	Year
Record high °C (°F)	15.7 (60.3)	20.5 (68.9)	24.4 (75.9)	29.8 (85.6)	33.3 (91.9)	37.0 (98.6)	38.4 (101.1)	39.5 (103.1)	32.2 (90.0)	27.7 (81.9)	23.0 (73.4)	16.9 (62.4)	39.5 (103.1)
Mean daily maximum °C (°F)	5.3 (41.5)	7.5 (45.5)	12.0 (53.6)	16.8 (62.2)	20.5 (68.9)	24.3 (75.7)	26.2 (79.2)	26.0 (78.8)	21.5 (70.7)	16.2 (61.2)	9.6 (49.3)	6.1 (43.0)	16.0 (60.8)
Daily mean °C (°F)	2.4 (36.3)	3.5 (38.3)	6.9 (44.4)	10.9 (51.6)	15.0 (59.0)	18.6 (65.5)	20.3 (68.5)	19.8 (67.6)	15.4 (59.7)	11.1 (52.0)	6.2 (43.2)	3.3 (37.9)	11.1 (52.0)
Mean daily minimum °C (°F)	−0.8 (30.6)	−0.4 (31.3)	1.9 (35.4)	4.9 (40.8)	9.2 (48.6)	12.7 (54.9)	14.4 (57.9)	14.0 (57.2)	9.9 (49.8)	6.7 (44.1)	2.7 (36.9)	0.3 (32.5)	6.3 (43.3)
Record low °C (°F)	−11.8 (10.8)	−12.6 (9.3)	−4.9 (23.2)	−2.8 (27.0)	1.1 (34.0)	6.1 (43.0)	6.4 (43.5)	6.5 (43.7)	1.2 (34.2)	−2.1 (28.2)	−7.2 (19.0)	−6.7 (19.9)	−12.6 (9.3)
Average precipitation mm (inches)	45.9 (1.81)	44.2 (1.74)	51.7 (2.04)	56.1 (2.21)	91.1 (3.59)	78.6 (3.09)	88.3 (3.48)	80.3 (3.16)	58.2 (2.29)	74.2 (2.92)	60.4 (2.38)	56.0 (2.20)	792.2 (31.19)
Average precipitation days (≥ 1.0 mm)	15.8	14.0	14.3	13.7	15.1	14.1	14.1	13.4	11.8	15.0	16.2	17.3	175.8
Average snowy days (≥ 1.0 cm)	4.1	3.3	1.0	0	0	0	0	0	0	0	0.4	2.6	11.4
Average relative humidity (%)	85.0	79.7	74.5	69.5	71.7	70.9	70.3	73.7	79.0	84.6	87.2	86.7	77.7
Mean monthly sunshine hours	59.3	89.8	146.6	192.0	218.9	240.2	253.3	235.2	183.7	108.5	62.5	46.6	1,835.4
Source 1: World Meteorological Organization
Source 2: Wetterdienst

== History ==
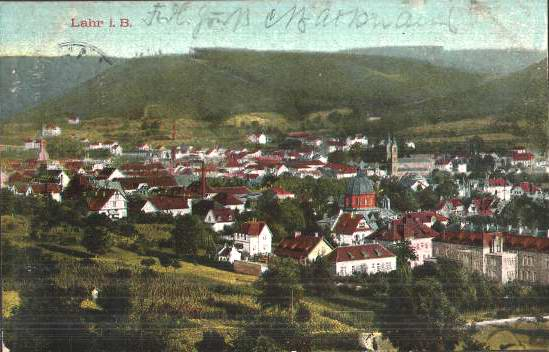
Lahr 1909

=== The city ===
Lahr developed around the Storchenturm ("stork tower") owned by the House of Gerolseck around 1220 and received a city charter around 1278. The charter was renewed in 1377 and served as the foundation for municipal independence through to the end of the Old Empire. The significant tax privileges enjoyed by Lahr allowed the city to quickly grow into a centre of trade during the eighteenth century.

The city and surrounding land with the same name remained the property of the Geroldsecks until 1426. Their successor was the House of Moers-Saarwerden, which gave half the land to Baden as collateral for loans and in 1497 legal ownership was transferred to it. The other half was transferred to the House of Nassau-Saarbrücken in 1522. Both Baden and the House of Nassau-Saarbrücken implemented the Reformation in the areas under their control and ruled the city jointly until the Baden half also became the property of the Nassaus in 1629.

The Thirty Years' War reduced the city's population significantly and during the Dutch War in 1677 it was burned to the ground by French troops under the leadership of Marshall de Créquy. Later on, during the eighteenth century, the citizens of Lahr sued the House of Nassau in the "Lahr Law Suits" in 1726 and 1778. The suits were decided in favor of the citizens of Lahr and thwarted Nassau's attempt at absolute rule.

In 1803 Lahr and the surrounding land in Baden became the seat of a court, whose areal boundaries were modified several times. During the 19th century Lahr was highly involved in the printing industry and the Burda Publishing Company, nowadays located in neighboring Offenburg, had its start at least partially in Lahr.

Between 1898 and 1919 and again between 1936 and 1945, the city was home to a garrison. After World War II, Lahr became one of the bases for the French until France left the North Atlantic Treaty Organization in 1966. After that, from 1967 until 1994, the Canadian NATO forces (CFB Lahr) maintained their European headquarters in Lahr. Following the closing down of the "old" Brigade Area in North Rhine-Westphalia centred around Iserlohn, Hemer, Deilinghofen as well as Werl and Soest (1970–1971)the Land Forces and their families were transferred to the Lahr area to join the existing Air Force contingent. On 6 May 1994, Werner Dietz, Mayor of Lahr/Schwarzenwald presented the Canadian Forces a plaque "The City of Lahr/Schwarzenwald, in the Black Forest, thanks the Canadian Forces for their contribution to Peace, Security and harmonious relations between Canadian and German populations of our city during their presence from 1967 to 1994." After the Canadian Forces left in 1994, a small Canadian contingent of former civilian employees remained in Lahr (approximately 200).

As early as 1939 Lahr was the seat of the rural district of the same name. Its automobile license plates code was "LR" but during the Baden-Württemberg district reform in the 1970s the district was dissolved and its communities were assigned and made part of the newly created Ortenau District.

=== The boroughs ===
Lahr's boroughs also have a long history. Hugsweier, Burgheim, Dinglingen, Langenwinkel, Mietersheim, and Sulz were once ruled by the same rulers as Lahr itself and therefore shared much of the city's history. In 1803, they became part of Baden and were communities in the former district of Lahr until they were merged into the city.

Hugsweier was first mentioned in 1341 as "Hugelswilre", Burgheim in 1035 as "Burcheim", Dinglingen in 961 as "Tuntelinga", Mietersheim in 762 as "Mutherisheim", and Sulz in 1270 as "Sulz".

Langenwinkel is a village with a fairly short history. It was built starting in 1787 in the area of the Nassau forest, which was cut down to make room for the new village, on land that belonged to Dinglingen. In 1790 the first house was built and in 1797 Langenwinkel became an independent community that was also made part of Baden in 1803. After 1951 the airfield for the Canadian Forces was built in Langenwinkel's immediate vicinity and the associated noise and traffic became a tremendous hardship for the residents of Langenwinkel. In 1965 the German Ministry of Defense decided therefore to move the village and Langenwinkel was recreated between 1968 and 1971 several kilometres southeast of the Hurster Hof.

Kippenheimweiler was first mentioned in 1427 as "Wilre" and then in 1462 as "Kippenwiler". It was an extension of Kippenheim and like Kippenheim it became part of the Baden House of Mahlberg in 1629. In 1810 it was assigned to the Ettenheim court and only íts subsequent dissolution did it become part of the district Lahr.

Kuhbach was first mentioned in 1035 as "Cuobach". Initially it belonged to the Geroldsecks. After the family divided into two in 1278 was it made part of Hohengeroldseck (Vogtei Seelbach). Ecclesiastically, it was first part of the Burgheim parish and was later assigned to the Lahr parish. After the counterreformation the town became Catholic again and was only made part of Baden in 1819 when it was assigned to the district of Lahr.

Reichenbach was first mentioned as "Richenbach" in 1270. The town was divided up between the Houses of Geroldseck and Tiersberg. During the fourteenth century the part owned by the Tiersbergs came after several detours into the possession of Baden and was given to the Röder vassals as a fief. The Hohengeroldseck part eventually became the property of the Counts van der Leyen. Reichenbach was initially Protestant but returned to Catholicism in 1658. The Baden-Röder part was then passed on to the County of Geroldseck in 1806 and with the County came into the possession of Austria in 1815. In 1819 it was returned to Baden and became part of the court of Hohengeroldseck. Only in 1832 was it made part of the Lahr district.

=== Religion ===
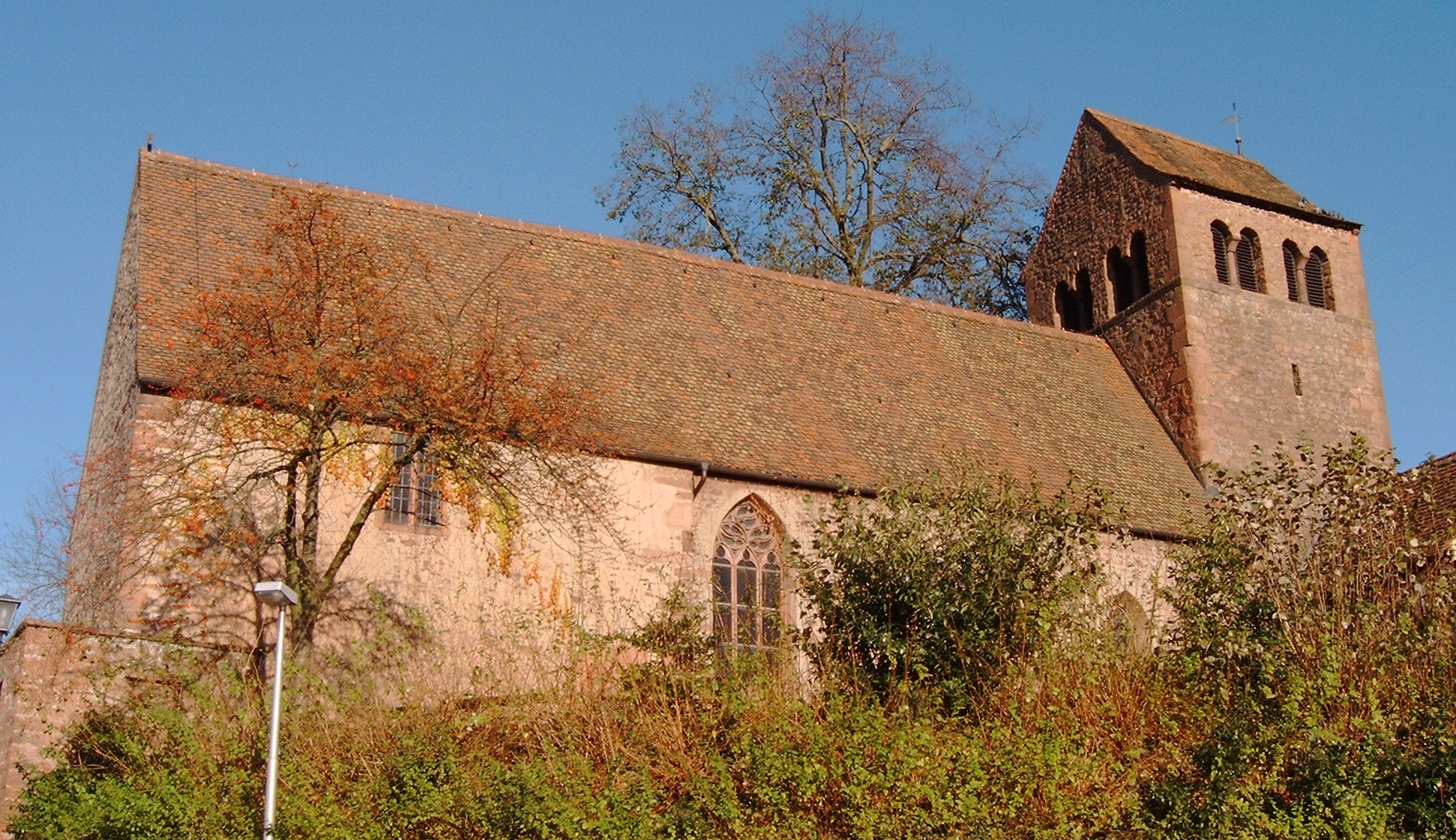
Burgheimer Kirche

The region around Lahr initially belonged to the Archdiocese of Strasbourg. The city itself was originally attached to the parishes of Dinglingen and Burgheim. Only the Chapel of Our Lady was located in Lahr. In 1259 the Augustinians founded a monastery which was moved to the outskirts of Dinglingen in 1349 and converted into a collegiate monastery in 1482. In 1492 the parish of Burgberg was moved to Lahr and the Chapel of Our Lady became the parish church. After the Reformation was introduced in 1558 until 1567, the monastery was dissolved and Lahr remained exclusively Protestant for the next several centuries. After Lahr came to Baden, the church became seat of a deanery which serves the entire surrounding area. Two other parishes developed from the original one, Christ Church Parish and Peace Parish, but were merged later on to form a combined parish. The combined parish today also includes John's Parish in Sulz, the Luther, Paul and Melanchton Parishes in Dinglingen and Lahr-West, and St Peter's Parish in Burgheim. Additional Protestant parishes are located in the boroughs of Hugsweier, Kippenheimweiler and Langenwinkel, while Langenwinkel is attached to the parish of Hugsweier and Kippenheimweiler to the parish in neighbouring Kippenheim. Protestants from Kuhbach and Reichenbach belong to the parish of Seelbach and those living in Mietersheim belong to the parish of Lahr. All Protestant parishes belong to the deanery of Lahr within the Evangelical Church in Baden. The Liebenzeller Association is also represented in Lahr.

At the beginning of the nineteenth century Catholics began to return to Lahr and in 1843 the first Catholic parish was founded, its church St. Peter and Paul constructed from 1846. St. Marien became the second Catholic parish in 1960 (its church was built in 1954 through 1956). Additional Catholic parishes exist in Dinglingen (Holy Spirit with church St. Martin in Hugsweier), Kuhbach (Mary Ascension and Chapel of Our Dear Lady), Reichenbach and Sulz (St. Peter and Paul). In Sulz a Simultaneum existed between 1773 and 1959 where Catholics and Protestants used the same church building.

In addition to the two large denominations the following are also represented in Lahr: several independent Protestant churches among them Baptists, Methodists and Pentecostals, and the New Apostolic Church.

=== District reform ===
In conjunction with several district reforms the following towns were merged with Lahr:

- 1899: Burgheim
- 1933: Dinglingen
- 1972: Hugsweier, Kippenheimweiler, Kuhbach, Langenwinkel, Mietersheim, Reichenbach and Sulz

=== Demographics ===
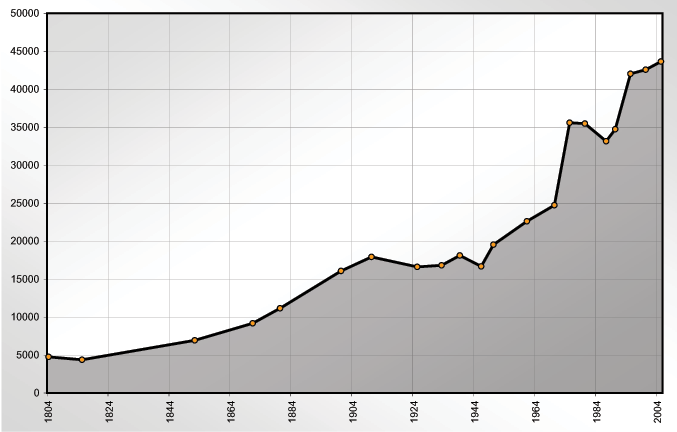
Lahr demographics

Figures reflect city limits at the time and are estimates (until 1870), Census data (¹), or official extensions thereof, counting only primary residences.

Year	Population
1804	4,753
1815	4,371
1852	6,939
December 1, 1871	9,173
December 1, 1880 ¹	11,152
December 1, 1900 ¹	16,068
December 1, 1910 ¹	17,919

Year	Population
June 16, 1925 ¹	16,609
June 16, 1933 ¹	16,807
May 17, 1939 ¹	18,100
1946	16,662
September 13, 1950 ¹	19,530
June 6, 1961 ¹	22,599
May 27, 1970 ¹	24,725

Year	Population
December 31, 1975	35,570
December 31, 1980	35,465
May 27, 1987 ¹	33,141
December 31, 1990	34,719
December 31, 1995	42,021
December 31, 2000	42,555
March 31, 2005	43,639

¹ Census data

Approximately 9,000 of Lahr's citizens are descendants of Germans who settled in Russia, and another 4,000 are descendants of other Soviet nationalities and so every fourth citizen of Lahr currently (as of 2006) lists the former Soviet Union as his or her place of birth.

== Government ==
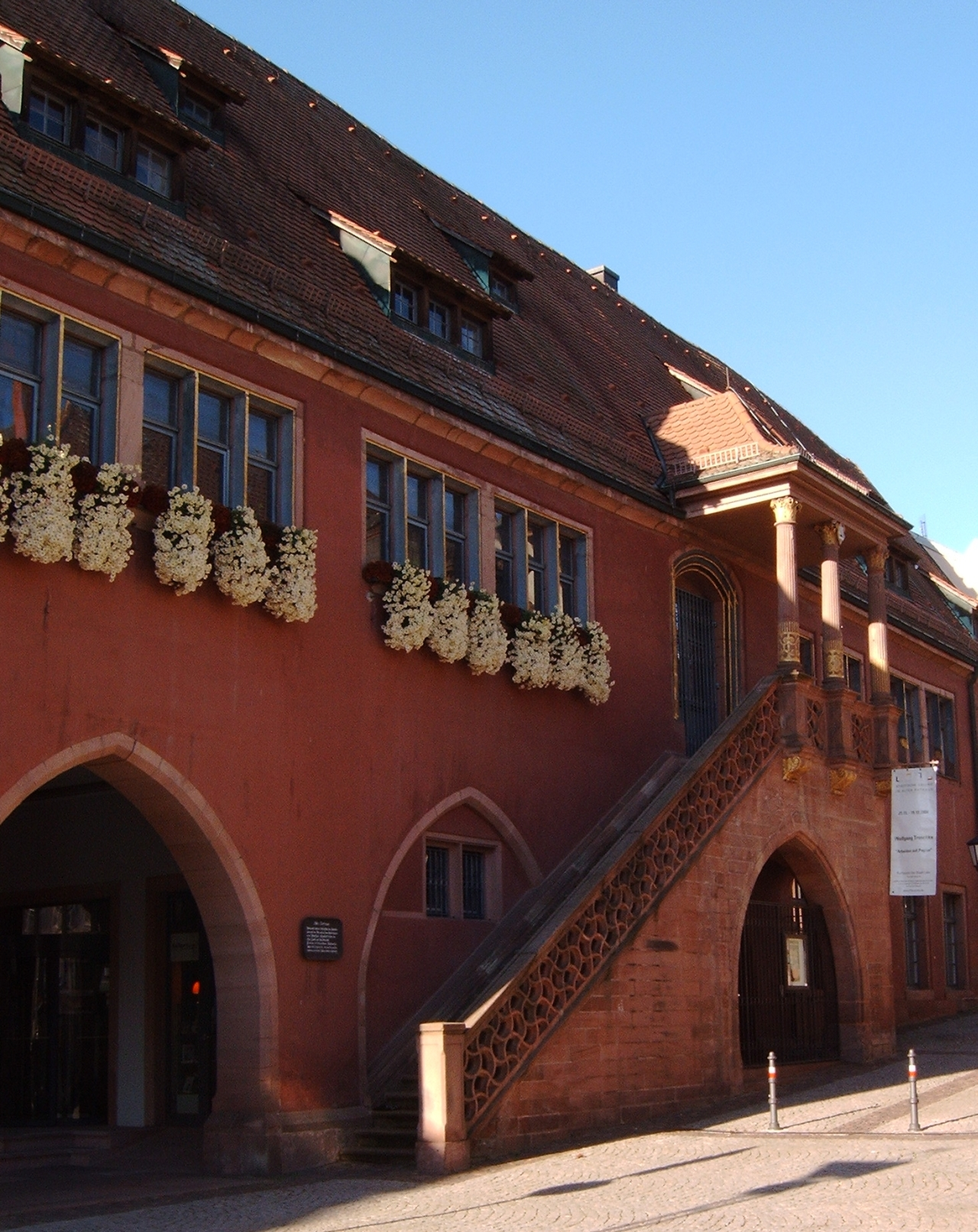
Former city hall

In connection with the district reform in the 1970s, municipal laws of Baden-Württemberg were amended to introduce borough councils for certain boroughs. Residents of such boroughs elect their borough council at each municipal election and the borough council must be consulted on all matters of significance to the respective borough. The Borough President also presides over the Borough Council. In Lahr the boroughs of Hugsweier, Kippenheimweiler, Kughbach, Langenwinkel, Mietersheim, Reichenbach and Sulz have borough councils.

=== City council ===
The elections in 2014 showed the following results:

- The LEFT: 2 seats
- SPD: 8 seats
- The Greens: 4 seats
- CDU: 8 seats
- FWG: 7 seats
- FDP: 3 seats
- Total: 32 seats

=== Mayor ===
Initially Lahr was headed up by four members of the council, referred to as "The Four". From 1377 the council consisted of 12 "Friends of the Council", of them four were considered mayors. In addition, there was an executor and a regal advocate to facilitate matters between the city and the ruling houses. From the 19th century on, there was only one mayor and a council with 11 members. Currently, the mayor is elected by the city's citizens for a term of eight years and he is also the President of the city council. His permanent deputy mayors are the "First councilperson" and "Second councilperson".

Mayors since 1803

Year	Mayor
1889–1899	Gustav Schlusser
1899–1928	Gustav Altfelix
1928–1929	Rudolf Binz
1929–1933	Heinrich Wolters
1933–1945	Karl Winter

Year	Mayor
1945–1952	Paul Waeldin
1952–1961	Heinrich Friedrich
1961–1981	Philipp Brucker
1981–1997	Werner Dietz
1997–2020	Dr. Wolfgang G. Müller
2020–present	Markus Ibert

=== Coat of arms ===
Lahr's coat of arms features a split shield. Displayed on the left is a red beam on golden background and on the right a silver wall on blue background. The wall has three merlons, an open gate and a portcullis that is pulled halfway up. The city colors are blue and white. The symbol in the coat of arms was used in official seals since at least 1305. It originates from the coat of arms of the House Geroldseck, founders of the city, and included the then customary symbol for cities, the wall. The wall was replaced with a parapet in the fifteenth century. Between 1898 and 1958 the coat of arms depicted only the parapet with the head of an angel holding the shield. This version was known since the 18th century but the city returned to the original version in 1958.

== People, culture and architecture ==
=== Buildings ===
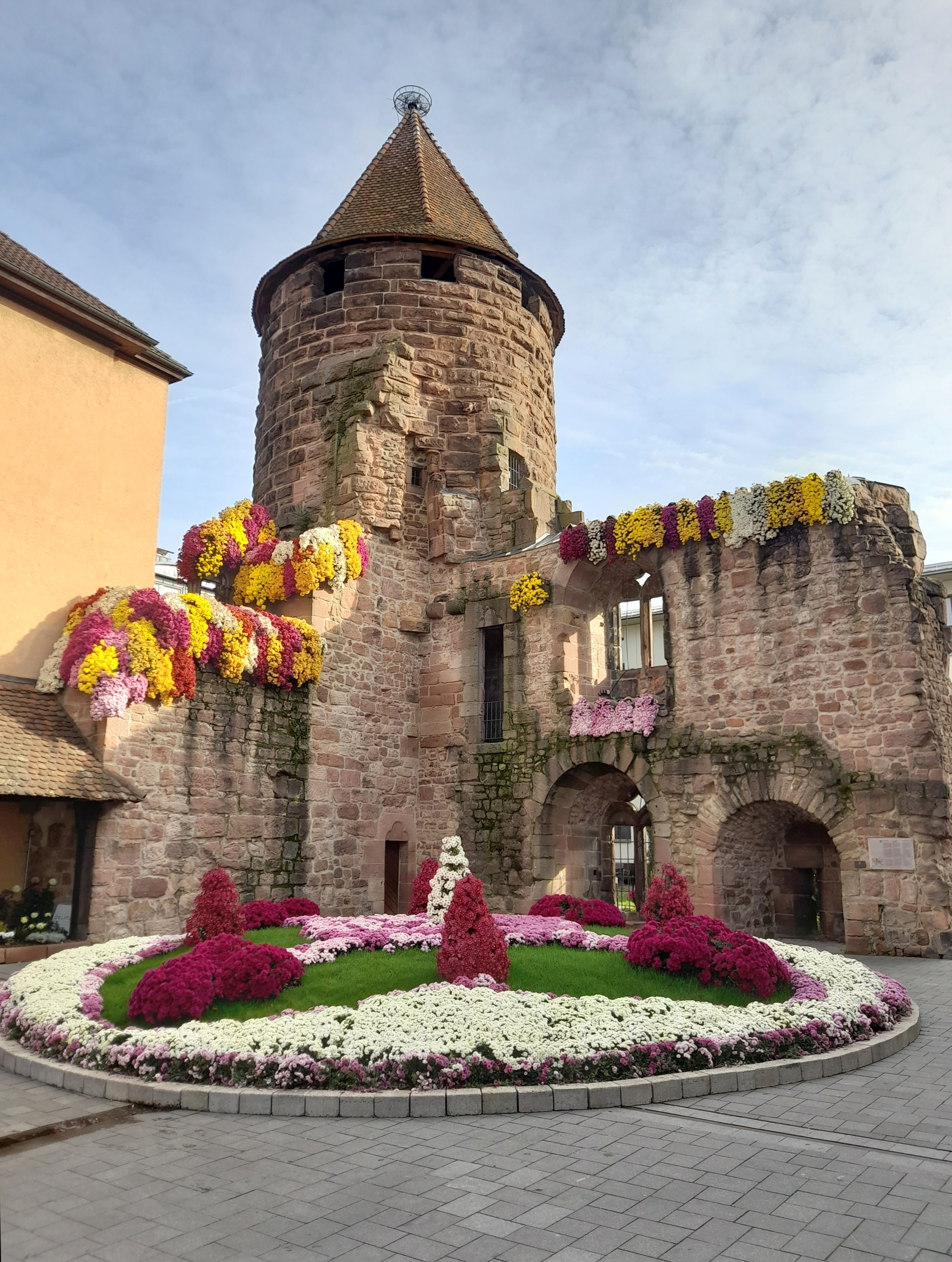
Storchenturm in Lahr during Chrysanthema

The Storchenturm (crane tower) is the logo of Lahr. The tower is a remnant of the former castle of the Geroldseck and remains together with parts of the old city wall. Other notables are the City park with museum in the Jamm villa and the foundry in the borough of Reichenbach. The new city hall, which was originally constructed as the home for an entrepreneur, features a facade by Friedrich Weinbrenner.

The main church serving the city is the Lutheran Stiftskirche, formerly Church of Our Lady, which is a late-gothic basilica with three naves and a tower that was built in 1874. Much older is the St. Peter's church in Burgheim, which is one of the oldest churches on the right side of the Rhine. Between 1877 and 1880 a second Protestant church was built, featuring a dome and built in the style of the Italian Renaissance. The Friedenskirche was built in 1956 and the first Catholic church, St. Peter and Paul, was built in 1846 in neo-Roman style and features two towers. The second Catholic church St. Marien was built between 1954 and 1956 and expanded in 1967.

In the boroughs are the Petrus Church in Burgheim (featuring a Roman Choir church with gothic murals), the St Martin's Church in Dinglingen (built in 1784), the Melanchton Church in Dinglingen (built 1979), former St. Margarethen Church in Hugsweier (built between 1755 and 1790), St. Martin's Church in Hugsweier (built in 1966), Kippenheimweiler Church (built in 1902, Chapel of Our Lady in Kuhbach (built in the 14th and 15th centuries), the church of the Assumption of our Blessed Lady in Kuhbach (built in 1956), the Mietersheim Chapel (built in the 16th and 17th centuries, the Reichenbach Church (built between 1846 and 1848 in neo-Roman style), St. Peter and Paul Church in Sulz (built in 1864 in neo-Roman style) and St. John's Church in Sulz (built in 1960).

A development of high-rise circular apartment houses, called the Canada Ring, was built in 1962 to accommodate Canadian Armed Forces personnel stationed in the region. The structures, designed and constructed by Heinrich Doll, Hans Walter Henrich and Klaus Humpert, are examples of the Brutalist architectural style. Their design reflects reflects an emphasis on functionality, with simple, clean lines and practical living spaces that provide balconies for the residents to enhance light and air circulation, "bringing the outside in." Their circular design, was intended to bring a sense of community for their inhabitants.

=== Events ===
The Chrysanthema is a three-week-long floral exhibition that takes place annually in autumn. It is visited by thousands from all over Germany and neighboring countries and features a decorated Altstadt (historic center of town).

== Economy and infrastructure ==
=== Infrastructure ===
Lahr owns an airport, the Flughafen Lahr, a former Canadian Forces base (CFB). The runway is 3 km long and 45m wide. However, there are no scheduled passenger services to and from the airport. The nearest passenger airports are Strasbourg Airport, located 49 km (30 mi) north west and Basel-Mulhouse-Freiburg Airport, located 117 km (73 mi) south of the city.

The city is accessible from the A 5 via the Lahr exit and the B 3, B 36 and B415 all intersect here.

Lahr (Schwarzw) station is a stop on the Rhine Valley Railway of the Deutsche Bahn but the former main train station in the heart of town and the tracks of the local railway from Seelbach (Schutter) to Kehl have been completely removed.

=== Media ===
In Lahr, the Schwarzwälder Bote, a daily newspaper, publishes a local edition by the name of "Lahrer Zeitung" and the local edition of the Badische Zeitung out of Freiburg (formerly Lahrer Anzeiger). The Offenburger Tageblatt also publishes a daily edition with a very comprehensive local section for Lahr and the surrounding area.

=== Public service ===
Lahr is home to the IV. Division of the Bereitschaftspolizei and several regional and state courts and of the Departments of Finance and Labor, as well as a notary public maintain branch locations here. Lahr is also the seat of the Deaconies Lahr of both the Archdiocese Freiburg and the Evangelical Church in Baden.

=== Education ===
There is a private university in Lahr and the hospital is a teaching hospital attached to the University in Freiburg.

The City has three college track high schools (Clara-Schumann-, Max-Planck- and Scheffel-Gymnasium), one non-college track high school (Otto-Hahn-Realschule), one school focusing on special education (Gutenbergschule), eight grammar schools (Eichrodt-Grundschule, Geroldseckerschule, Johann-Peter-Hebel-Schule, Luisenschule, Schutterlindenberg-Schule, Grundschule Kuhbach, Grundschule Langenwinkel, Schulhaus Kippenheimweiler and Grundschule Mietersheim), two combined grammar and middle schools (in Reichenbach and in Sulz) and two middle schools (Friedrich-Hauptschule und Theodor-Heuss-Hauptschule Dinglingen).

In addition, Ortenau (district) operates several vocational schools, a schools for the speech impaired with attached Kindergarten, and a school for the mentally disabled, also with attached Kindergarten.

Additional public schools are the Clara-Schumann-Gymnasium (where students with a degree from non-college track high schools may obtain a degree equivalent to a college-track high school) with room and board, a specialty school for painters, and the nursing school that is attached to the hospital.

Numerous private and specialty training schools complete the picture, among them the Abendrealschule and Abendgymnasium where students with middle school and non-college track high school diplomas are able to gain college entrance prerequisites on a part-time basis after work.

== Notable people ==
- Philipp Jakob Siebenpfeiffer, (DE Wiki) (1789–1845), lawyer and journalist, main speaker at the Hambach Festival
- Ludwig Eichrodt (1827–1892), poet and dramatist, died in Lahr
- Charles Fingado (1841–1901), member of the Wisconsin State Assembly
- Ludwig Sütterlin (1865–1917), inventor and creator of the Sütterlinschrift
- Emil Rudolf Weiß (1875–1942), painter and typographer
- Hans Furler (1904–1975), politician (CDU), president of the European Parliament (1960–1962)
- Helmut Beinert (1913–2007), biochemist, was born in Lahr
- Philipp Brucker, (DE Wiki) (1924–2013), journalist, author, mayor of Lahr
- Felix Wankel (1902–1988), mechanical engineer, inventor of the Wankel engine
- Dieter Schnebel (1930–2018), composer of experimental music and theologian.
- Tabea Zimmermann (born 1966), violist, professor
- Jürgen Leonhardt (born 1957), philologist.
- Tommy Mac (born 1971), musician, electric guitarist, bassist of the rock band Hedley

=== Sport ===
- Oliver Schäfer (born 1969), football player and coach, played 402 games
- Christina Obergföll (born 1981), retired javelin thrower
- Sascha Riether (born 1983), retired footballer, played 396 games

== Twin towns – sister cities ==
Lahr is twinned with:

- Alajuela, Costa Rica (2006)
- Belleville, Canada (1971)
- Dole, France (1962)
