= Gunzenhausen =

- Town
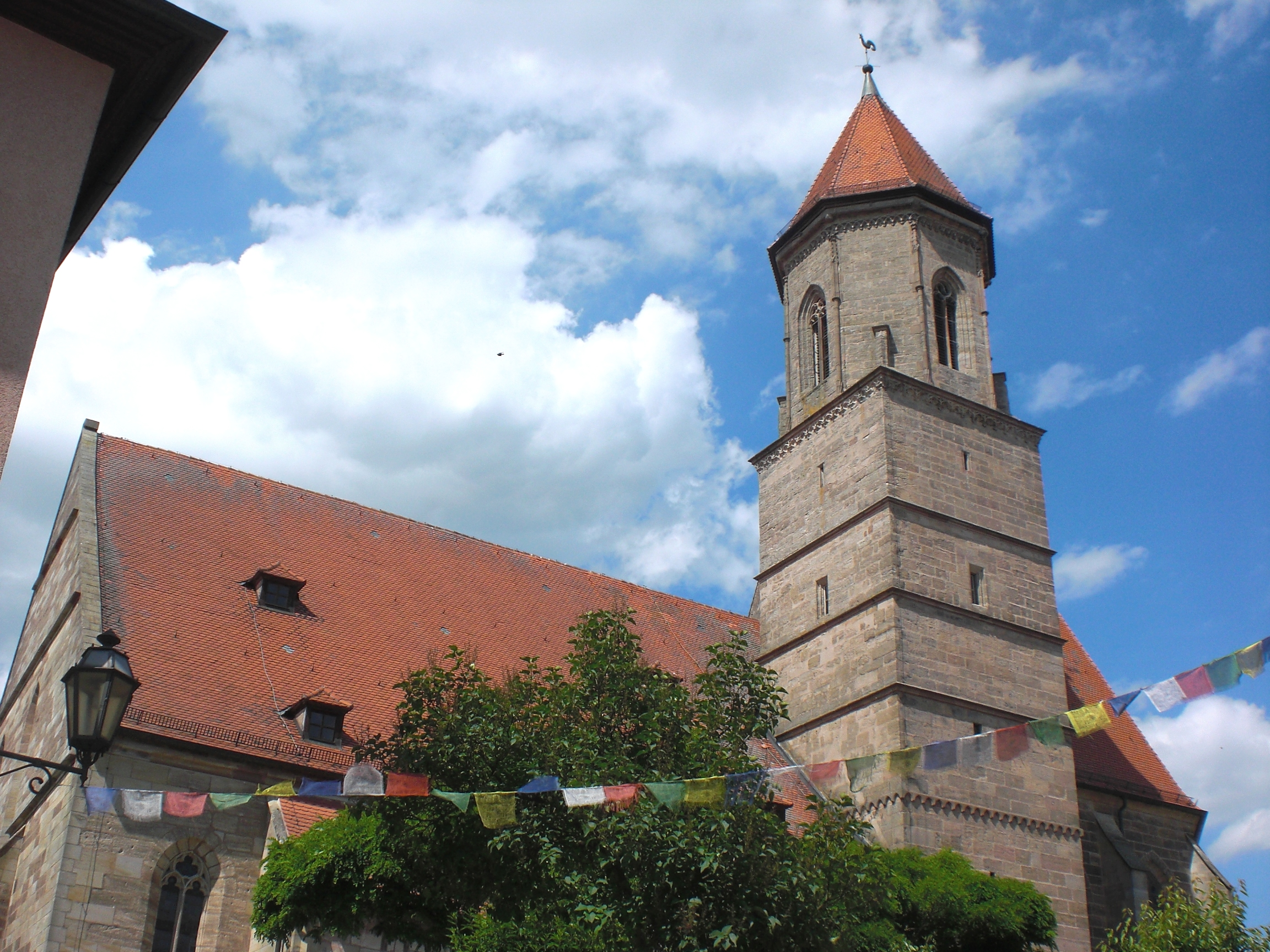
- Protestant St. Mary's Church

- Coat of arms

- Location of Gunzenhausen within Weißenburg-Gunzenhausen district
- Interactive map of Gunzenhausen
- Location within Germany Location within Bavaria
- Coordinates: 49°06′53″N 10°45′15″E
- Country: Germany
- State: Bavaria
- Admin. region: Mittelfranken
- District: Weißenburg-Gunzenhausen
- Subdivisions: 14 Stadtteile

Government
  - Mayor (2020–26): Karl-Heinz Fitz (CSU)

Area
  - Total: 82.72 km^{2} (31.94 sq mi)
- Elevation: 416 m (1,365 ft)

Population (2025-12-31)
  - Total: 16,698
  - Density: 201.9/km^{2} (522.8/sq mi)
- Time zone: UTC+01:00 (CET)
  - Summer (DST): UTC+02:00 (CEST)
- Postal codes: 91710
- Dialling codes: 09831
- Vehicle registration: WUG, GUN
- Website: gunzenhausen.de

Gunzenhausen (German pronunciation: [ɡʊntsn̩ˈhaʊzn̩]; Bavarian: Gunzenhausn) is a town in the Weißenburg-Gunzenhausen district, in Bavaria, Germany. It is situated on the river Altmühl, 19 kilometres (12 mi) northwest of Weißenburg in Bayern, and 45 kilometres (28 mi) southwest of Nuremberg. Gunzenhausen is a nationally recognized recreation area. It is noted as being at one end of part of The Limes Germanicus, a Roman border wall, and a UNESCO World Heritage Site.

== History ==
Numerous excavations within the city of Gunzenhausen document that the area was occupied and there was a settlement in pre-historic time. In the year 90 the Romans expelled the Celts, occupied the inhabited areas north of the Danube, and expanded into the Gunzenhausen area. In the year 241 the Alemanni invaded the area and destroyed the fortress. A document from the year 823 supplies the first reliable written reference to Gunzenhausen.

Emperor Ludwig der Fromme conveyed the monastery "Gunzinhusir" to the High-monastery of Ellwangen. Later the "Truhendinger" and the "Oettinger" families became Lords of Gunzenhausen, and in 1368 Gunzenhausen came to the House of Hohenzollern. So the city received the right of holding fairs and was allowed to build city walls, towers and moat, as well as a large church. Gunzenhausen had a big Jewish community and a "Moorish" synagogue, built in 1882; the latter had its onion domes removed and was partially converted to "profane uses" during the Hitler regime, and by 1939 the town was declared Judenrein (free of Jews).

In the 1970s eighteen municipalities were combined resulting in the city growing to about 17,000 inhabitants.

Gunzenhausen is mentioned in W. G. Sebald's collection of literary stories entitled The Emigrants (1992).

== International relations ==
Gunzenhausen is twinned with:

- - Frankenmuth, Michigan, United States
- - Isle, Haute-Vienne, France

== Transport ==
The town lies on the Treuchtlingen-Würzburg railway.

== Local notables ==
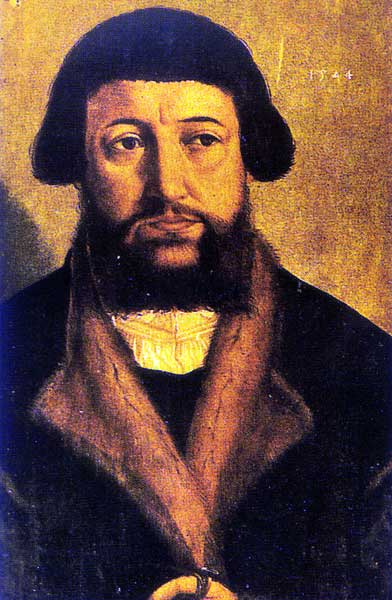
Andreas Osiander, 1544

- Andreas Osiander (1498–1552), Lutheran theologian and Christian mystic
- Adam Neuser (c. 1530–1576), Protestant pastor of Heidelberg who held Antitrinitarian views; was imprisoned, escaped, and later converted to Islam
- Simon Marius (1573–1625), astronomer who gave the names to the Jovian satellites Io, Europa, Ganymede and Callisto
- August Richter (1831–1907), Wisconsin businessman and politician
- Wilhelm Stählin (1883–1975), Lutheran theologian, bishop, preacher and one of the major initiators of the Liturgical Movement in German Protestantism in the 20th century

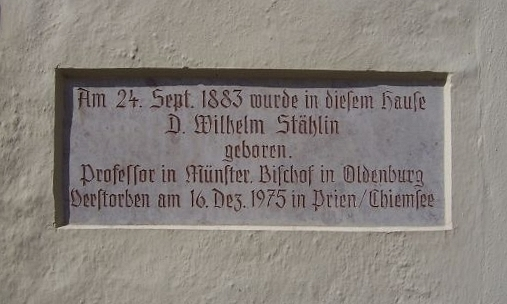
Birth house Wilhelm Stählin

- Otto Willi Gail (1896–1956), science journalist and science fiction author
- Günter Heimbeck (b. 1946), a German–Namibian retired professor of mathematics best known for his contributions to geometry
