= Jürgen Leonhardt =

German classical philologist

Jürgen Leonhardt (born 12 August 1957) is a German classical philologist. He taught at the University of Rostock, Marburg University, and at the University of Tübingen, there from 2004. He has been dean of the faculty of humanities there from 2010. His standard work about the history of Latin was translated into French and English.

== Life ==
Leonhardt was born in Lahr. After studying musicology and classical philology at the University of Tübingen and LMU Munich from 1976 to 1982, he worked as a research assistant in Munich until 1993. He achieved his doctorate there in 1985 and his habilitation in 1994. The same year, Leonhardt was appointed full professor at the University of Rostock. In 1997, he moved to Marburg University, and in 2004 to the chair of Latin Philology II in Tübingen. Leonhardt has been a full member of the Heidelberg Academy of Sciences and Humanities since 2006 and was vice-chairman of the Deutscher Altphilologenverband from 2001 to 2005.

From 2008, Leonhardt served as dean of the Faculty of Cultural Studies. After being elected merger commissioner in July 2009, he prepared the merger of this faculty with two others to form a new faculty of humanities. As a result, he was elected dean of the new faculty in 2010.

Leonhardt's research interests include Latin and Greek literature from Classical Antiquity to the Early Modern Period. He has written monographs on Latin verse theory from Late Antiquity to the early Renaissance, on the origins of Greek drama and on Cicero's Criticism of the Schools of Philosophy. His non-fiction book on the history of Latin, first published in 2009, appeared in French in 2010 and in English in 2013. Leonhardt's other research interests include the importance and reception of Latin in Europe, the history of education in the early modern period and Neo-Latin literature. He has also appeared as an editor of choral music, including Carl Philipp Emanuel Bach's Die alte Litanei 1 and Die neue Litanei 2.

His 2009 standard work Latein. Geschichte einer Weltsprache was translated into French by Bertrand Vacher in 2010 as La grande histoire du Latin, and into English as Latin : Story of a World Language by Kenneth Kronenberg, published by Harvard University Press in 2013. A reviewer summarised that the book "outlines the changing uses of the Latin language from its first literary attestations to the present day", in chronology over the language of the Roman empire, then the Carolingian Renaissance, and finally a period when fluency in spoken Latin deteriorated but Latin was still part of education. She thought that the book's breadth and "accessible and engaging style" made it accessible to a public even outside academia.

=== Personal life ===
Leonhardt is married; the couple has three children.

== Publications ==
Leonhardt's publications include:

- Dimensio syllabarum. Studien zur lateinischen Prosodie- und Verslehre von der Spätantike bis zur frühen Renaissance. Mit einem ausführlichen Quellenverzeichnis bis zum Jahr 1600. Göttingen 1989 (Hypomnemata. Untersuchungen zur Antike und zu ihrem Nachleben 92; zugleich Dissertation, Ludwig-Maximilians-Universität München), ISBN 3-525-25191-2.
- Phalloslied und Dithyrambos. Aristoteles über den Ursprung des griechischen Dramas. Heidelberg 1991 (Abhandlungen der Heidelberger Akademie der Wissenschaften, Philosophisch-Historische Klasse 1991,4) ISBN 3-533-04353-3.
- Ciceros Kritik der Philosophenschulen. Munich 1999 (Zetemata 103; at the same time habilitation thesis, Ludwig-Maximilians-Universität München), ISBN 3-406-44729-5.
- Latein. Geschichte einer Weltsprache. Munich 2009, ISBN 978-3-406-56898-5.
  - translated into French by Bertrand Vacher: La grande histoire du latin. Paris 2010, ISBN 978-2-271-06962-7. New edition 2015, ISBN 978-2-271-08694-5.
  - Translated in English by Kenneth Kronenberg: Latin. Story of a World Language. Harvard University Press, Cambridge, Massachusetts / London 2013, ISBN 978-0-674-05807-1.

As editor:

- Melanchthon und das Lehrbuch des 16. Jahrhunderts. Begleitband zur Ausstellung im Kulturhistorischen Museum Rostock, 25 April until 13 July 1997. Rostock 1997, ISBN 3-86009-118-2.
