= August Richter (politician) =

American politician

August Richter (August 9, 1831 – June 7, 1907) was an American real estate agent from Milwaukee, Wisconsin who served a single one-year term as a member of the Wisconsin State Assembly.

== Background ==
Richter was born in Gunzenhausen, Kingdom of Bavaria on August 9, 1831; he was educated at the höhere bürgerschule level. He left Bavaria in 1852, came to Wisconsin in 1856, settled in Milwaukee and for some years ran a meat market. He shifted his business to that of real estate agent, in the latter years of his career specializing in timberlands in Michigan and northern Wisconsin, particularly Oneida County, Wisconsin.

He married Marie Sauber; their son August Jr., born August 1, 1861, would become a prominent real estate dealer; and would serve on the Milwaukee Common Council and the Milwaukee Board of School Directors.

== Public office ==
In 1866, he was elected to the Milwaukee County Board of Supervisors; but an 1867 ruling of the Wisconsin Supreme Court nullified the results of that election, and he was one of four members removed from the Board. A new election was held in the fall, and he was elected once more to represent the Second Ward of the City of Milwaukee. In 1869 he was elected chair of the County Board.

In 1870 he was elected to the Assembly's 2nd Milwaukee County district (the Second Ward of the City) as a Democrat, with 597 votes to 517 for Independent John Orth (the Democratic incumbent George Abert was not a candidate).

In 1871, Abert was the Democratic nominee. Richter ran anyway as an "Independent Democrat", but garnered only 227 votes to Abert's 569. Richter would attempt once more in 1873 to regain his seat in the Assembly, running against Joseph Hamilton as an independent when Hamilton, like most Democrats, was a member of the short-lived People's Reform Party, also known as the Liberal Reform Party. He polled only 161 votes to Hamilton's 1,277. After this defeat, he retreated from competition for public office.

== Later years ==
Richter became an active member of Milwaukee's Old Settlers Club. He lived in his later years with his son August Jr., and died in that home on June 7, 1907.
