= Christian Widule =

American politician

Christian Widule was a member of the Wisconsin State Assembly and Wisconsin State Senate.

== Biography ==
Widule was born on July 19, 1845, in Germany. He died from a stroke on October 9, 1916, in Milwaukee, Wisconsin.

== Career ==
Widule was a member of the Assembly in 1879 and of the Senate from 1887 to 1889. He was a Republican.
