= KENW =

KENW may refer to:

- KENW (TV), a television station (channel 3) licensed to serve Portales, New Mexico, United States
- KENW-FM, a radio station (89.5 FM) licensed to Portales, New Mexico, United States
- the ICAO code for Kenosha Regional Airport
