= Journey Church =

Coordinates: 42°34′08.9″N 87°56′17.1″W

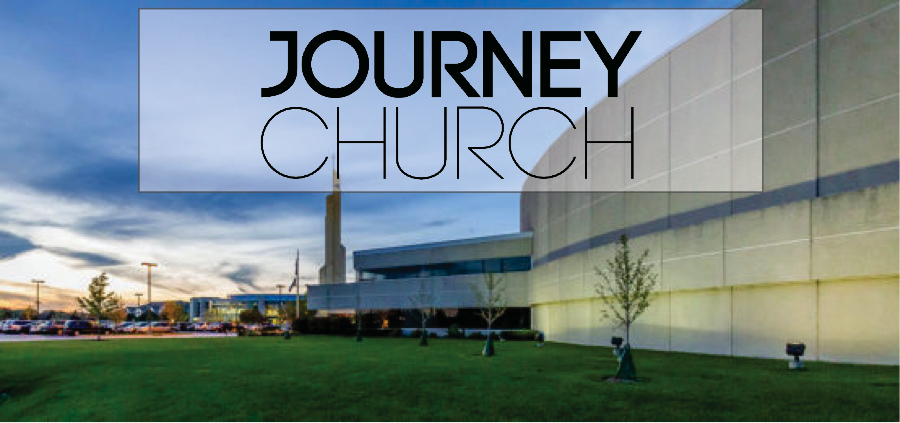
Journey Church logo and Kenosha campus main auditorium

Journey Church is a Pentecostal church with locations in Kenosha, Wisconsin, Burlington, Wisconsin, Beach Park, Illinois, and Mount Pleasant, Wisconsin. It is affiliated with the Assemblies of God USA. Its lead pastor is Kevin Taylor. Since its founding in the US, the church has also opened a campus in Vilnius, Lithuania. The location in Kenosha holds two weekend services with an attendance over 2,600. The location in Burlington holds one weekend services with an attendance of about 150. The Kenosha location livestreams its services through its website. Services are also uploaded to the Journey Church website to be watched at any time.

== History ==
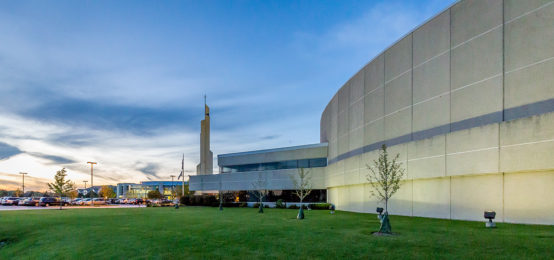
Building in Kenosha

James Davidson moved to Kenosha, Wisconsin in 1917 to join the Peniel Tabernacle. In 1933, Davidson invited Rev. Finis Dake to lead Sunday afternoon prayer meetings in the vacant Cameo Theater in Kenosha. Prayer meetings turned into Christian Assembly church, which was chartered with the Assemblies of God denomination on February 18, 1935.

=== Previous locations ===
The church purchased property at 2500 Roosevelt Rd. in Kenosha with Otis Keener as the founding pastor. In 1939, the name was changed from Christian Assembly to Assembly of God. A radio broadcast began around the same time, and ran until about 1970.

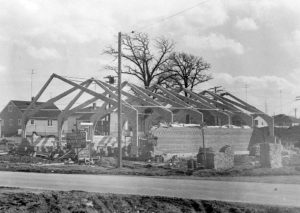
Journey Church congregation's second location under construction at 60th St. and Pershing Blvd. in Kenosha

A new building located at 60th St. and Pershing Blvd. in Kenosha was completed in 1960, accompanied by the new name Kenosha First Assembly of God. The church grew from 150 to 500 attendees.

A second sanctuary at 60th St. and Pershing Blvd. was completed in 1976, and Christian Life School was initiated in 1977. Peniel Tabernacle joined Kenosha First Assembly in 1981, and church attendance rose to over 1000 during the 1980s.

=== Current locations ===
Consistent higher attendance required a new location, and they wanted to be near Interstate 94 and 75th St. for easy access. In 1987, 137 acres of land at 10700 75th St. was purchased. A developer and other businesses purchased parcels throughout the 1990s, enabling the church to pay off land debt and retain 45 acres. Christian Life School and Kenosha First Assembly occupied the current building in early 1993.

Pastor Dan Remus began his role as senior pastor in 1995, after being the youth pastor since 1980. Pastor Kevin Taylor started as worship director in 1996, and started his role as co-lead pastor in 2006.

In the spring of 2013 the Burlington campus was obtained making Levi Ketelsen the campus pastor. The current building is located at 740 Center St. Burlington, WI. In October 2021, Pastor Stephen Jackson became the campus pastor.

Journey Church // Beach Park began May 1, 2017 and Pastor Jay English is the Beach Park Campus Pastor. The church is located at 12735 W Graves Ave., Beach Park, IL.

Journey Church // Mount Pleasant began October 1, 2023 and Pastor Bradley Roberts is the Mount Pleasant Campus Pastor. The church is located at 9605 Spring St., Mount Pleasant, WI.

=== Modern history ===
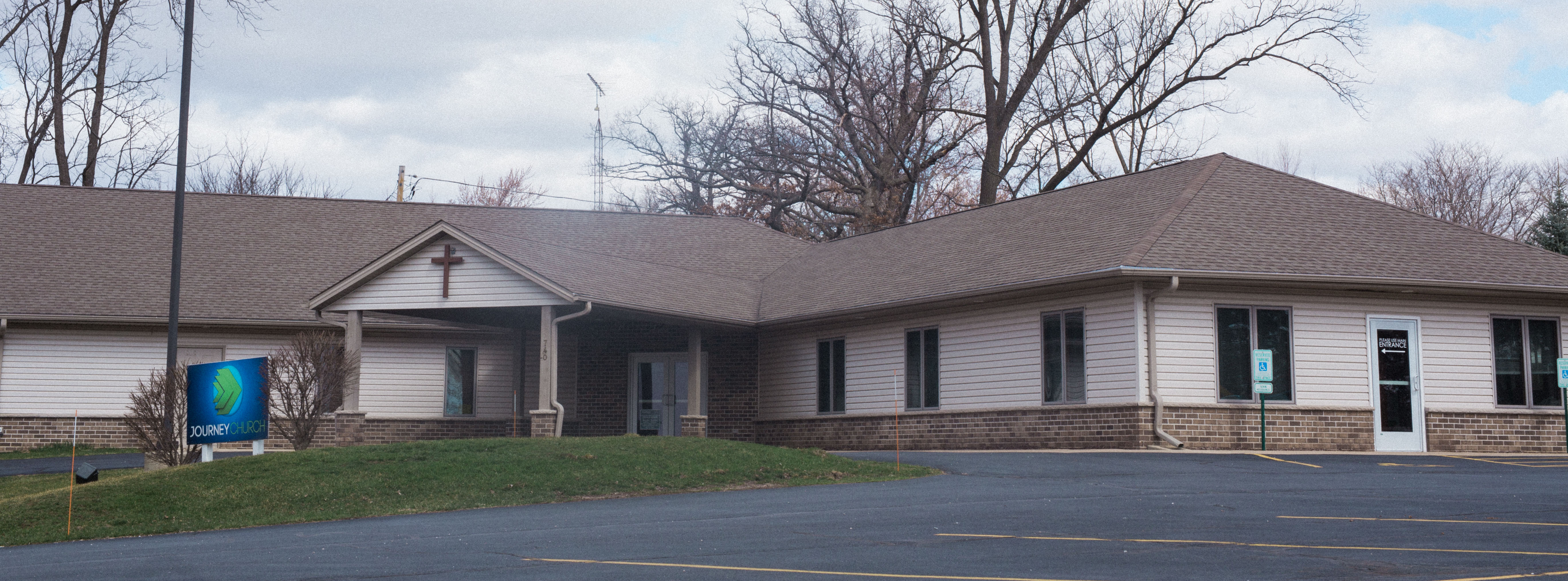
Journey Church Burlington campus building

Journey Ministry College began in the fall of 2011 with 13 students. At the same time, a Saturday evening worship service was started. In the spring of 2013, Kenosha First Assembly acquired Burlington Assembly of God as its second campus. The church’s name changed to Journey Church, and campuses were differentiated as Journey Church // Kenosha, Journey Church // Burlington, Journey Church // Beach Park, and Journey Church // Mount Pleasant. On August 1, 2015, Kevin Taylor became the sole senior lead pastor.

Journey Church is community-focused by supporting volunteering, advocacy, and awareness.

== Current statistics ==
As of 2016, weekly attendance across both locations was over 3,200 and was named a 2017 Outreach 100 church by Outreach Magazine. In 2015, Journey Church supported 142 missionaries in the U.S. and foreign countries with $750,000.

In 2015, Journey Kids attendance was 379, Journey Youth attendance was 180, and Journey Ministry College 2015-2016 enrollment was 30. Sixteen pastors were on staff.
