= Mars Cheese Castle =

Retail store in Kenosha, Wisconsin, U.S.

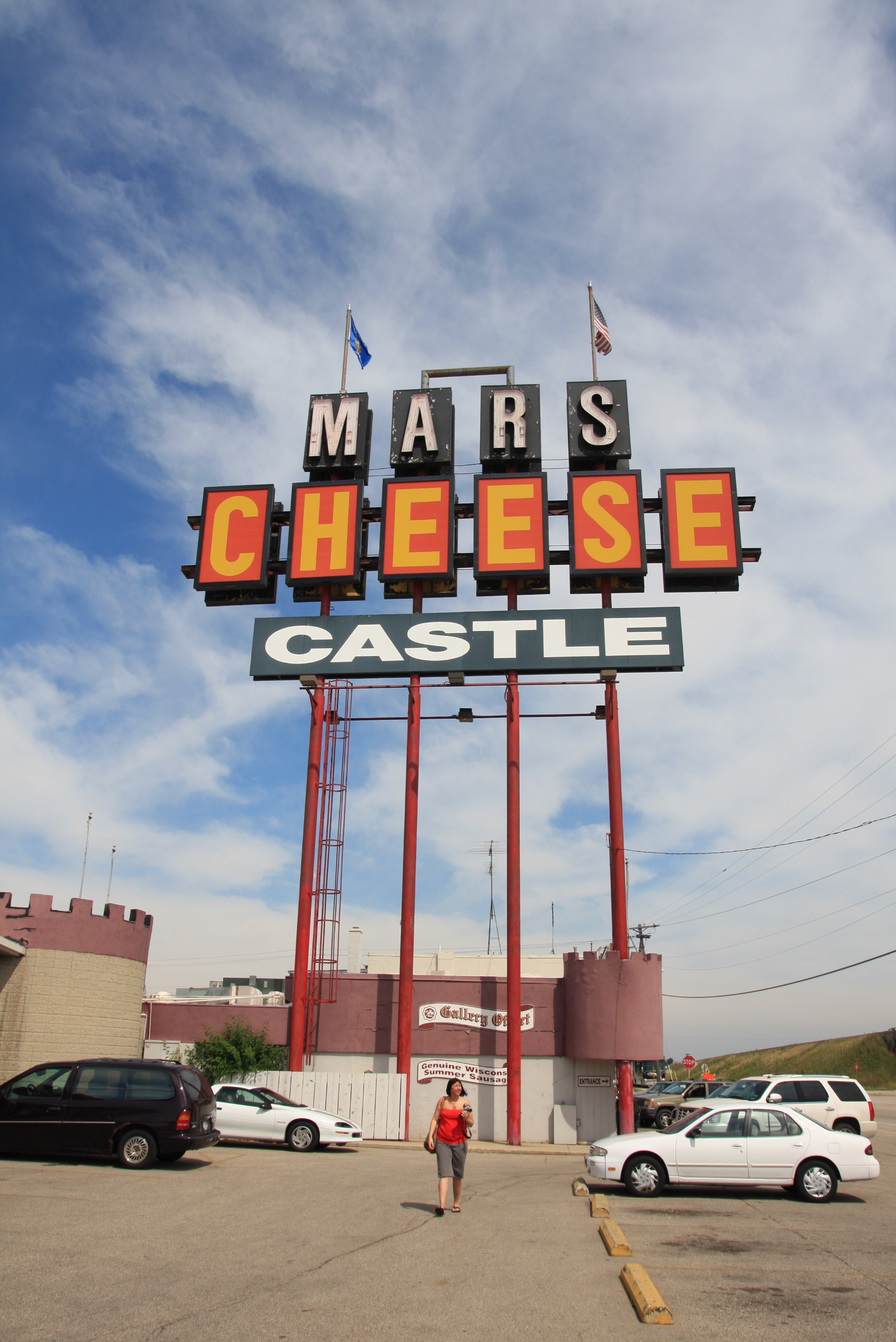
- The Mars Cheese Castle sign in 2009
- Interactive map of Mars Cheese Castle

Restaurant information
- Established: 1947
- Food type: Cheese, fast food
- Location: 2800 West Frontage Road, Kenosha, Wisconsin, 53144, U.S.
- Coordinates: 42.6147°N 87.9543°W
- Website: www.marscheese.com

Mars Cheese Castle is a specialty food store, delicatessen, and taproom which sells a variety of consumable products in Kenosha, Wisconsin. Located along Interstate 94, the shop is popular among Wisconsin visitors and has been called a "cheese landmark", "one of Wisconsin's most recognizable cheese stores", and "an icon for generations of I-94 travelers". While the store is best known for its cheese, it also sells sausages and other foods, beer, wine, specialty condiments, soft drinks and Wisconsin souvenirs such as cheesehead hats.

The store is the oldest cheese shop located at what the Milwaukee Journal Sentinel called "Wisconsin's most visible cheese interchange"; the junction of Interstate 94 and Wisconsin Highway 142 had three cheese shops until 2009 when it was reduced to two.

The in-store deli offers burgers, bratwurst, and other sandwiches. A variety of draft and bottle beers are available in the taproom – including imported European beers and Wisconsin microbrews. There is also a bakery on site.

== History ==
Mario Ventura, Sr., opened Mars Cheese Castle in 1947. The shop's name was inspired by its owner's, as the name Mario comes from the Roman god Mars; the "Castle" part of the name was inspired by a castle in Italy owned by Ventura's mother. Kenosha artist George Pollard designed the store's logo; the project was Pollard's first job. The original store, which featured a large beer bottle on its roof, burned down in 1957; a new store was built nearby.

In 2011, a project widening Interstate 94 forced the store to relocate 50 yards (46 m) away from the freeway. The new store, over twice as large as the previous building, was designed to more closely resemble an actual castle; it features a watchtower holding the store's wine and an entrance which resembles a drawbridge. A special statute passed by the Wisconsin Legislature allowed the store to keep its 80-foot (24 m) sign at its new location despite a state law prohibiting signs that tall.

Mars Cheese Castle has attracted a number of celebrity visitors. Rock band Weezer held a record signing at the store in 2001, and Al Hirt, Al McGuire, John F. Kennedy, and Johnny Cash have all visited the store. Then–U.S. Vice President Joe Biden also stopped at the store while campaigning for the 2012 presidential election.

== See also ==
- Frank's Diner
