= Washington Park Clubhouse =

- U.S. National Register of Historic Places
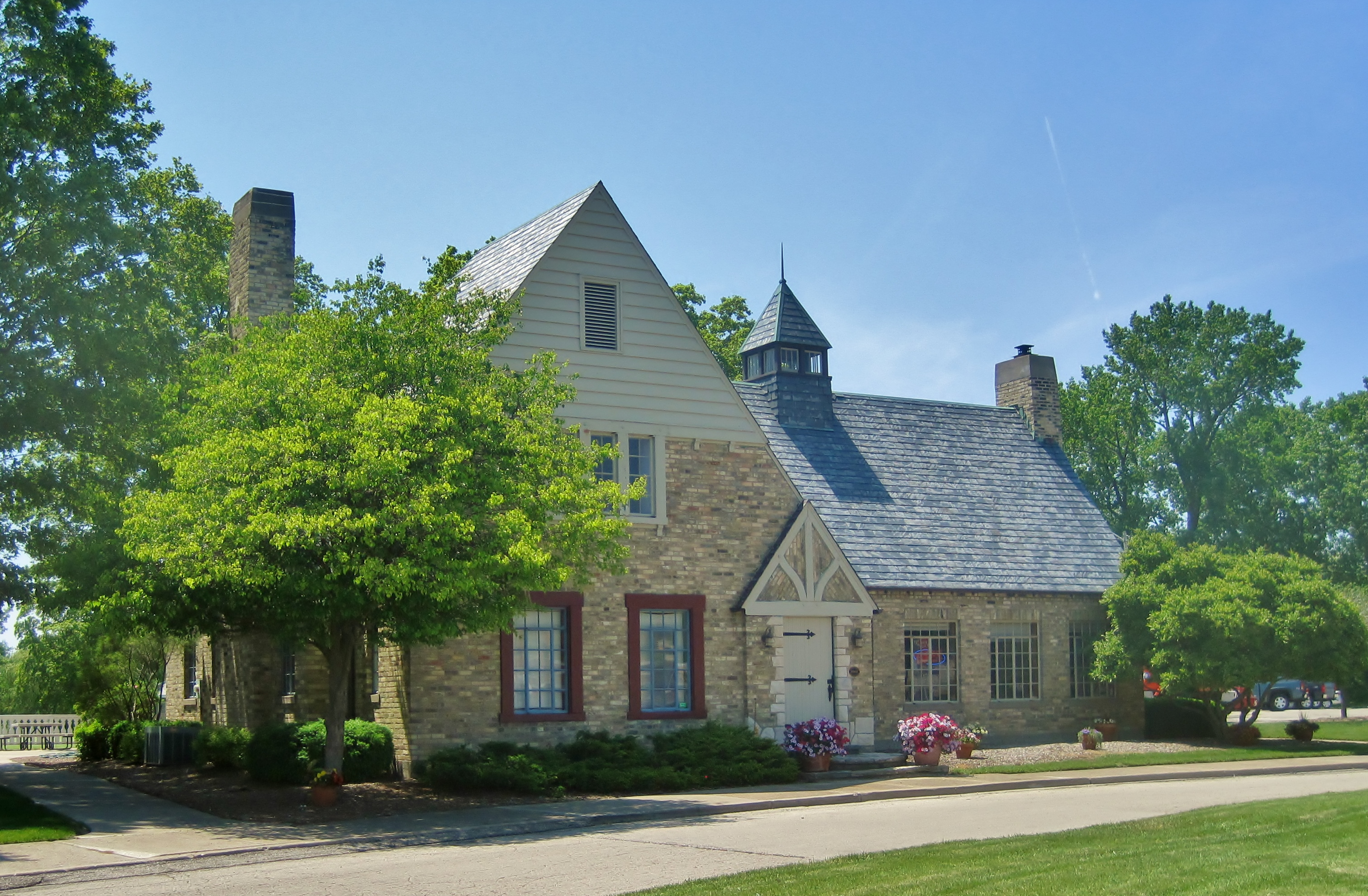
- Washington Park Clubhouse
- Location: 2205 Washington Rd., Kenosha, Wisconsin
- Coordinates: 42°36′04″N 87°50′11″W
- Area: less than one acre
- Built: 1936
- Architect: Hugo Bothe
- Architectural style: Tudor Revival
- NRHP reference No.: 02001740
- Added to NRHP: January 23, 2003

The Washington Park Clubhouse is located in Kenosha, Wisconsin.

== History ==
The clubhouse services a public golf course, which was opened in 1922. In part, the clubhouse was a Works Progress Administration project. The building was added to the State Register of Historic Places in 2002 and to the National Register of Historic Places the following year.
