= Christian Life School =

Private school in Kenosha, Wisconsin, US

Coordinates: 42°34′09.9″N 87°56′15.8″W

- Kenosha, Kenosha County, Wisconsin; United States

Information
- Religious affiliation: Journey Church
- Established: 1977; 49 years ago
- Teaching staff: 54
- Grades: Pre-Kindergarten - Grade 12
- Enrollment: 759
- Average class size: 15
- Student to teacher ratio: 11:1 (upper school)
- Website: kclsed.org

Christian Life School is an independent, evangelical, interdenominational, co-educational, college-preparatory school located in Kenosha, Wisconsin, in the United States. It has 759 students, from Prekindergarten to 12th grade, and 54 teachers.

The school was founded in 1977 by Journey Church. The Administrator is Jeff Bogaczyk. The Upper School has a student/teacher ratio of 11 to 1, with an average class size of 15.
