= Manor House (Kenosha, Wisconsin) =

Historic house in Wisconsin, United States

- U.S. National Register of Historic Places
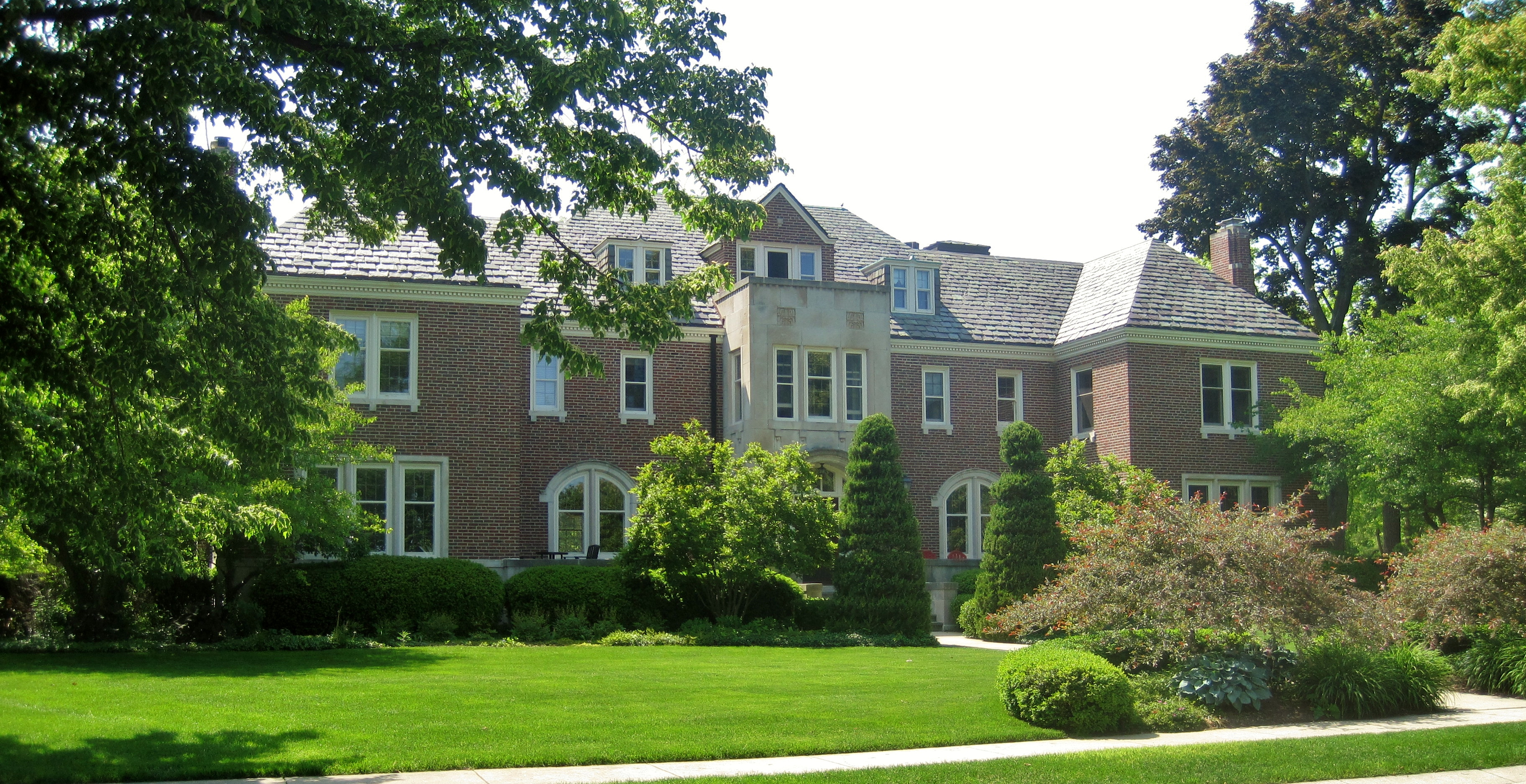
- Manor House
- Location: 6536 3rd Ave., Kenosha, Wisconsin
- Coordinates: 42°34′28″N 87°48′55″W
- Area: 0.5 acres (0.20 ha)
- Built: 1926
- Architect: Pond and Pond
- NRHP reference No.: 80000145
- Added to NRHP: October 29, 1980

The Manor House is located in Kenosha, Wisconsin.

== History ==
The house was built for James E. Wilson, an executive with Nash Motors. It was later used as the residence for headmasters of Kemper Hall. The house was listed on the National Register of Historic Places in 1980 and on the State Register of Historic Places in 1989.
