= Justin Weed House =

Historic house in Wisconsin, United States

- U.S. National Register of Historic Places
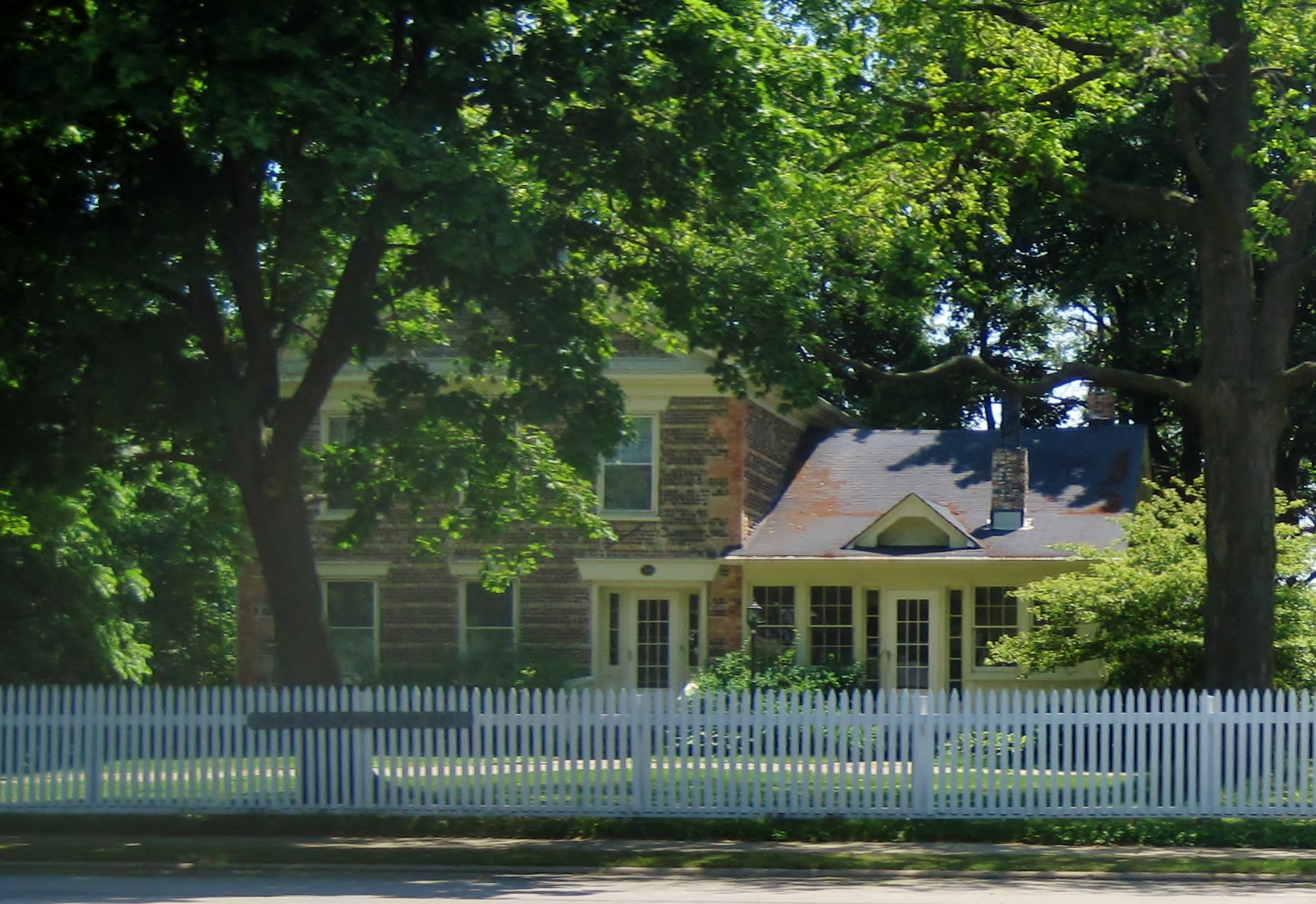
- Justin Weed House
- Location: 3509 Washington Rd., Kenosha, Wisconsin
- Coordinates: 42°36′09″N 87°51′07″W
- Area: less than one acre
- Built: 1848
- Architectural style: Greek Revival
- NRHP reference No.: 74000094
- Added to NRHP: December 3, 1974

The Justin Weed House is located in Kenosha, Wisconsin. It was listed on the National Register of Historic Places in 1974 and on the State Register of Historic Places in 1989.
