= Kenosha, Wisconsin =

City in Wisconsin, United States

- City
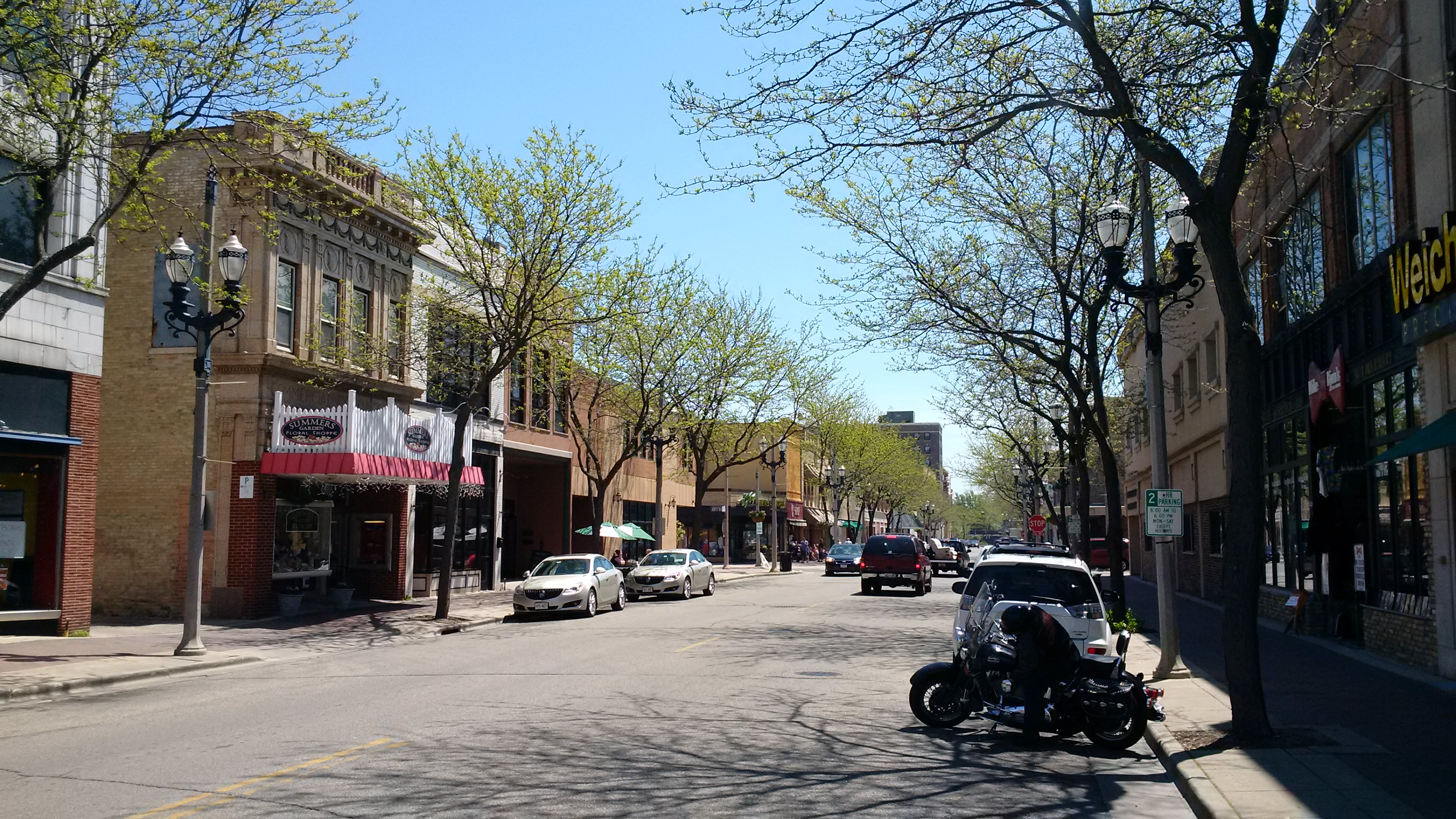
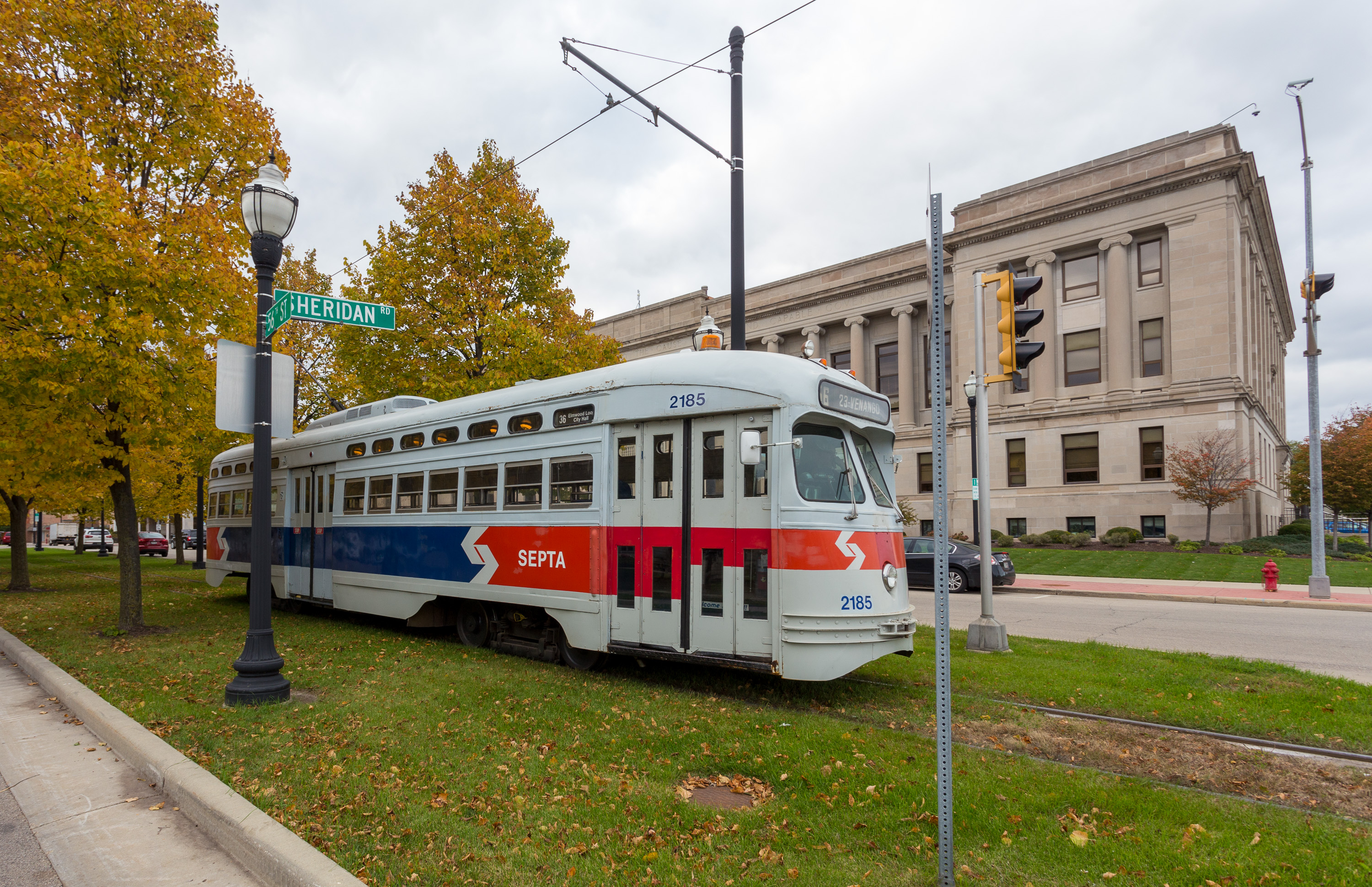
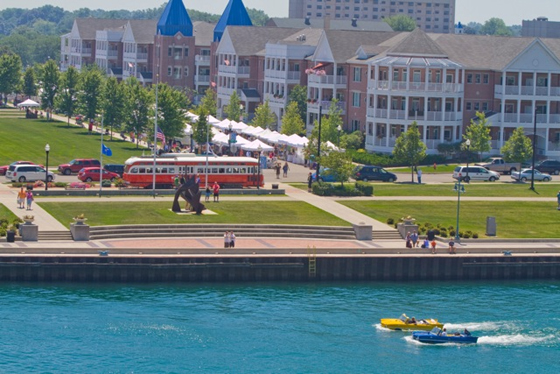
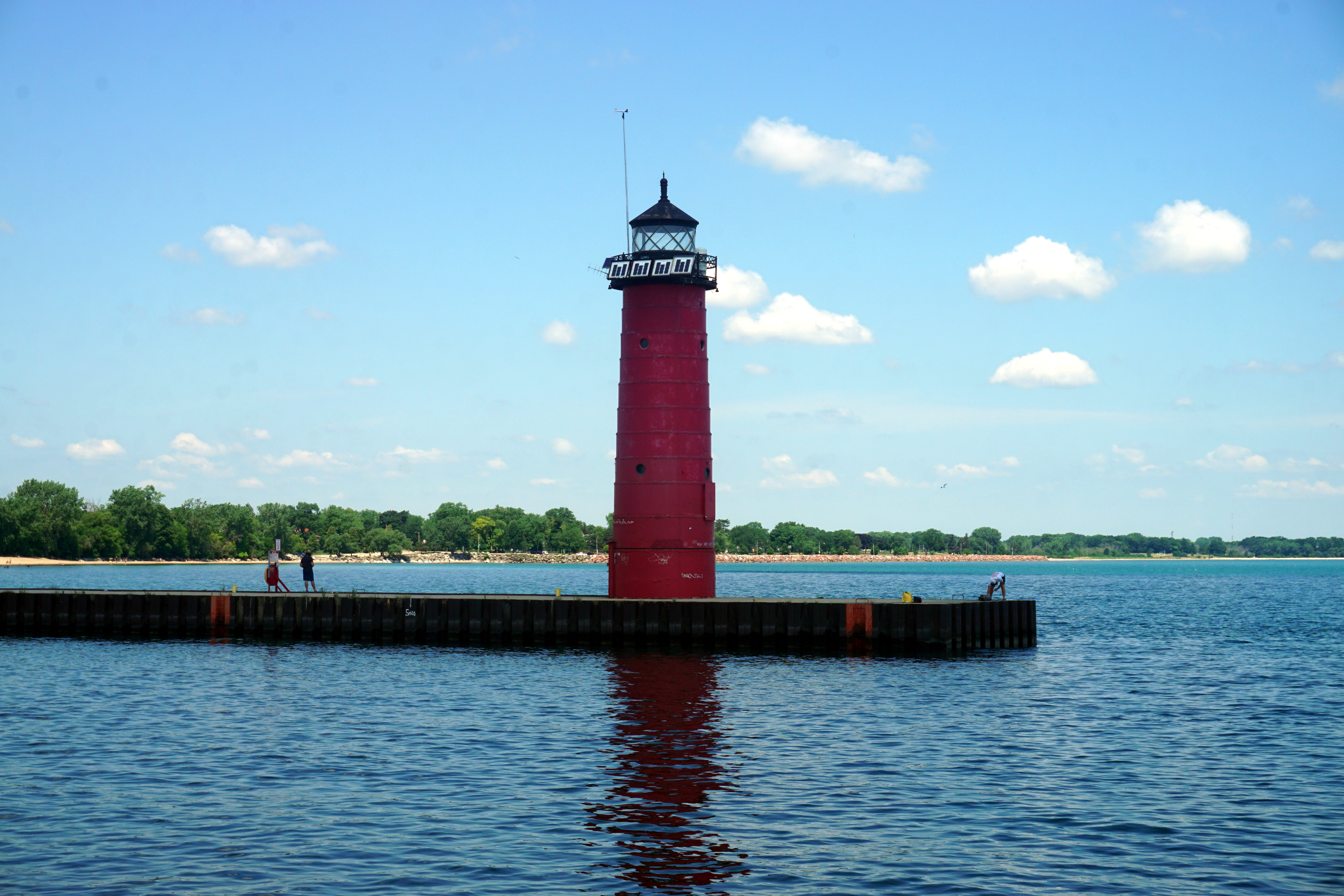
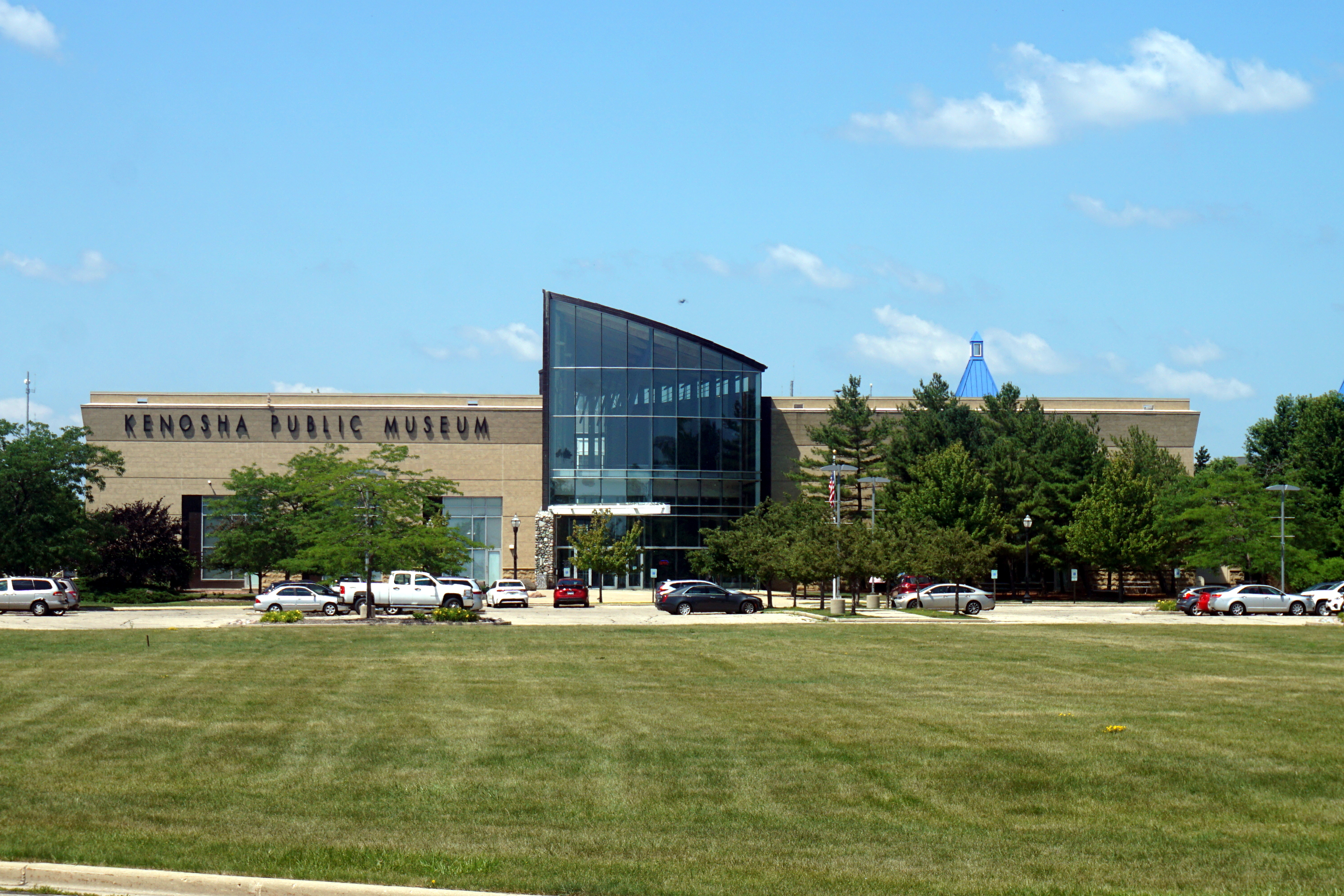
- Downtown Kenosha Kenosha streetcar HarborPark North Pier Light Kenosha Public Museum

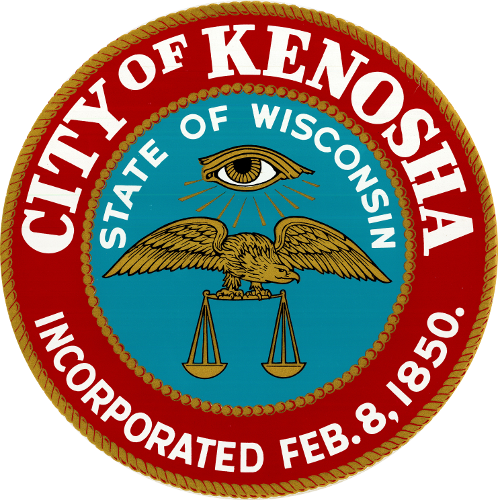
- Seal Logo
- Nickname: K-Town
- Motto: Chart a Better Course
- Interactive map of Kenosha, Wisconsin
- Location within Wisconsin Location within the United States
- Coordinates: 42°34′56″N 87°50′44″W
- Country: United States
- State: Wisconsin
- County: Kenosha
- Settled (Pike Creek): 1835
- Incorporated (village of Southport): February 9, 1841
- Incorporated (city of Kenosha): February 8, 1850; 176 years ago

Government
  - Type: Municipality
  - Mayor: David F. Bogdala
  - City Admin.: John Morrissey

Area
  - City: 28.45 sq mi (73.69 km^{2})
  - Land: 28.36 sq mi (73.46 km^{2})
  - Water: 0.089 sq mi (0.23 km^{2})
- Elevation: 604 ft (184 m)

Population (2020)
  - City: 99,986
  - Rank: 4th in Wisconsin
  - Density: 3,523.6/sq mi (1,360.46/km^{2})
  - Urban: 125,865 (US: 265th)
  - Metro: 169,151 (US: 264th)
- Demonym: Kenoshan
- Time zone: UTC−6 (CST)
  - Summer (DST): UTC−5 (CDT)
- ZIP Codes: 53140–53144
- Area code: 262
- FIPS code: 55-39225
- GNIS feature ID: 1567416
- Commuter Rail
- Website: www.kenosha.org

Kenosha (/kəˈnoʊʃə/) is a city in Kenosha County, Wisconsin, United States, and its county seat. Located on the southwestern shore of Lake Michigan, it is the fourth-most populous city in Wisconsin, with 99,986 residents at the 2020 census. The Kenosha metropolitan statistical area, consisting solely of Kenosha County, has roughly 169,000 residents. Kenosha is a satellite city located roughly 32 miles (51 km) south of Milwaukee and 50 miles (80 km) north of Chicago via Interstate 94 (I-94) and has significant cultural and economic connections to both cities. The U.S. Census Bureau considers Kenosha part of the Chicago–Naperville, IL–IN–WI Combined Statistical Area. Kenosha is connected to Chicago via the Metra commuter rail, with the Kenosha station being the only passenger station in Wisconsin.

Founded in 1835 and originally called Southport, the city incorporated as Kenosha in 1850. The city developed as a port and manufacturing center; it remained a regional hub for automotive and durable goods production through the 20th century before transitioning to a diversified economy in the 21st century, to include manufacturing, logistics, retail, and healthcare, boosted by its location along I-94.

Kenosha is the headquarters of Snap-on and Jockey International and hosts several higher education institutions, including the University of Wisconsin–Parkside and Carthage College. Cultural and recreational facilities include more than 12 miles of largely public access lakefront including various waterfront parks and marinas, the Kenosha Public Museum, Civil War Museum, and a restored electric streetcar system that serves the downtown HarborPark area.

== History ==
The Potawatomi originally named the area Kenozia (also transcribed ginoozhe, kinoje) "place of the pike", while the Menominee referred to the place as Kenūsīw, meaning "Northern Pike". The early Ojibwa name is reported as Masu-kinoja "trout (pike) come all at once". These refer to the annual spawning of trout, in which thousands of fish entered the rivers from Lake Michigan, providing food for the coming months.

Sites of early human habitation have been discovered in the Kenosha vicinity. It remains unclear if any sites pre-date the Clovis culture but, if so, those sites would be contemporaneous with the Wisconsin glaciation. Paleo-Indians settled in the area at least 13,500 years ago.

The first European settlers, part of the Western Emigration Company, arrived in the early 1830s, from Hannibal and Troy, New York, led by John Bullen Jr., who sought to purchase enough land for a town. Thwarted in Milwaukee and Racine, the group arrived at Pike Creek on June 6, 1835, building log houses and later homes of frame, native stone, and brick. The first school and churches followed, with platting completed in 1836. As more settlers arrived and the first post office was established, the village was known as Pike Creek, then renamed Southport in 1837, a name which lives on as a southeast-side neighborhood, park, and elementary school, and has been adopted by several businesses.

The area became an important Great Lakes shipping port. In 1850, the village changed its name from Southport to Kenosha, which is its current name. The name Kenosha was adapted from the Chippewa word kinoje (pike or pickerel).

=== 20th century ===
From the beginning of the 20th century through the 1930s, Italian, Irish, Polish, and German immigrants, many of them skilled craftsmen, made their way to the city and contributed to the city's construction, culture, architecture, music, and literature.

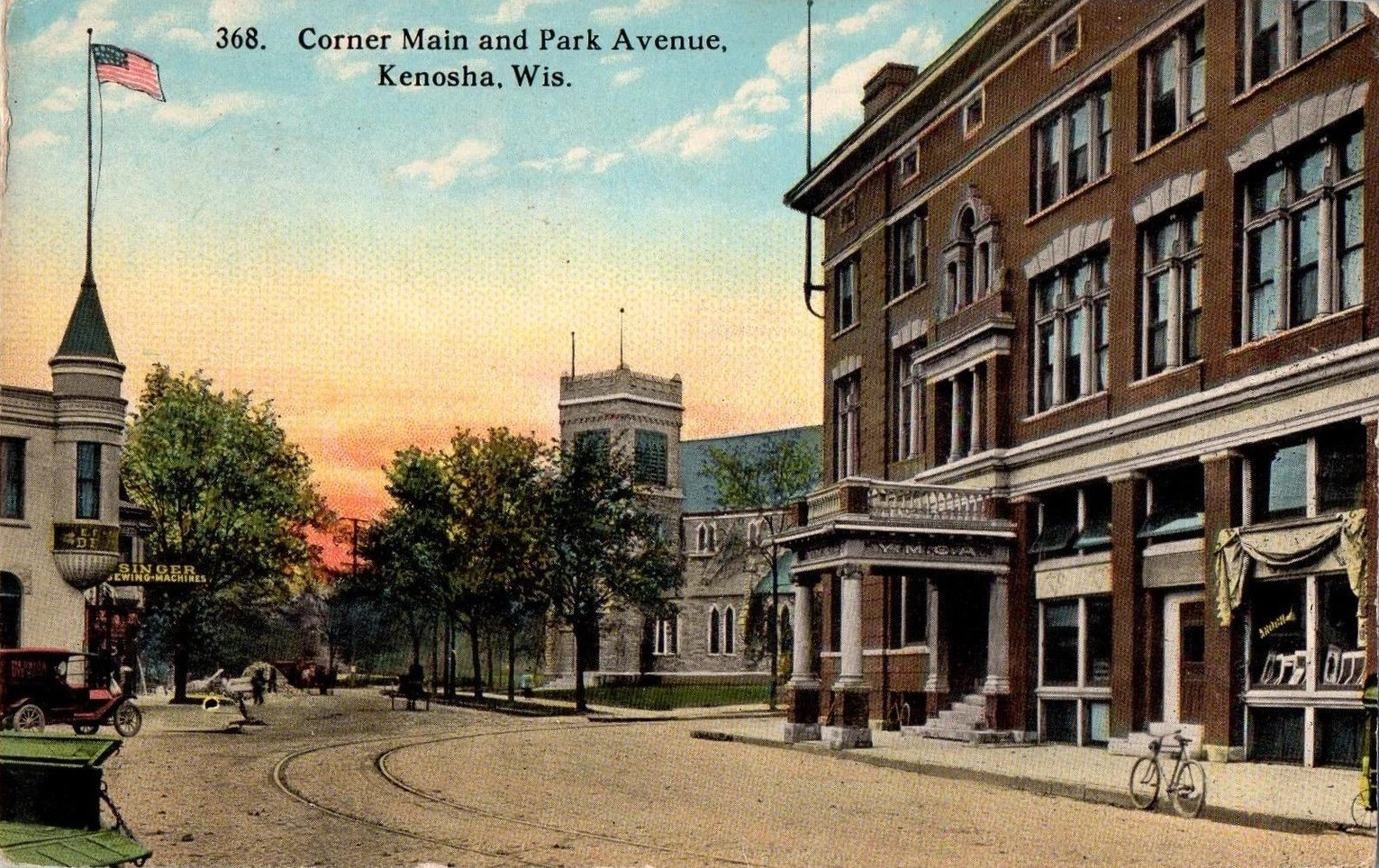
Main and Park Avenue in Kenosha, circa 1907 to 1915

Kenosha was home to large automotive factories which fueled its economy during the 20th century. Between 1902 and 1988, Kenosha produced millions of automobiles and trucks including makes and models such as Jeffery, Rambler, Nash, Hudson, LaFayette, and American Motors Corporation (AMC). In May 1954, Nash acquired Detroit-based Hudson and the new firm was named American Motors Corporation. A 47-acre (190,000 m^{2}) westside park and an elementary school are named for Charles W. Nash. A prototype steam car was built in Kenosha by Robert Symmonds, Jr., John Sullivan, and Louis Larsen in 1900. Two years later, the Thomas B. Jeffery Company, builders of the Sterling bicycle, began production of the Rambler runabout. In 1902, Rambler and Oldsmobile were the first cars to employ mass-production techniques. The 1903 Rambler was also the first US-built production automobile to use a steering wheel, rather than the then-common tiller-controlled steering. Auto executive Charles W. Nash purchased Jeffery in 1916 and the new company became Nash Motors.

In partnership with French automaker Renault, AMC manufactured several models in Kenosha in the early 1980s, including the Alliance, which won the 1983 "Car of The Year" award from Motor Trend. Two decades earlier, AMC's 1963 Rambler Classic had also received the award. In 1987, Renault sold its controlling interest in AMC to Chrysler Corporation, which had already contracted with AMC for the production of its M-body mid-sized cars at the Kenosha plant. The AMC Lakefront plant (1960–1988), a smaller facility, was demolished in 1990 (a chimney-demolition ceremony that June drew 10,000 spectators) and was redeveloped into HarborPark. The area now hosts lakeside condominiums, a large recreational marina, numerous parks and promenades, sculptures, fountains, the Kenosha Public Museum, and the Civil War Museum, all of which are connected by the Kenosha Electric Railway streetcar system.

Like other Rust Belt cities, Kenosha deindustrialized in the 1980s, causing it to gradually transition into a services-based economy. In the 2010s, the city and surrounding county have benefited from an expanding economy and increased job growth.

In 1973, residents in the Town of Pleasant Prairie sought to have territory annexed and rezoned to allow for the industrial development of agricultural property. In the ensuing legal battle between Kenosha and Pleasant Prairie, the town accused the city of improperly coercing or bribing agricultural property owners to file for rezoning and annexation in order to obtain city water and electric services that could not be provided by the town. The town argued that industrial development would jeopardize the town's residential nature. The court found the annexation proper, with no illicit bribes or improper conduct by the city.

In June 1993, the city installed reproductions of the historic Sheridan LeGrande street lights that were specially designed for Kenosha by Westinghouse Electric in 1928; these can be seen on Sixth Avenue between 54th Street and 59th Place.

=== 21st century ===
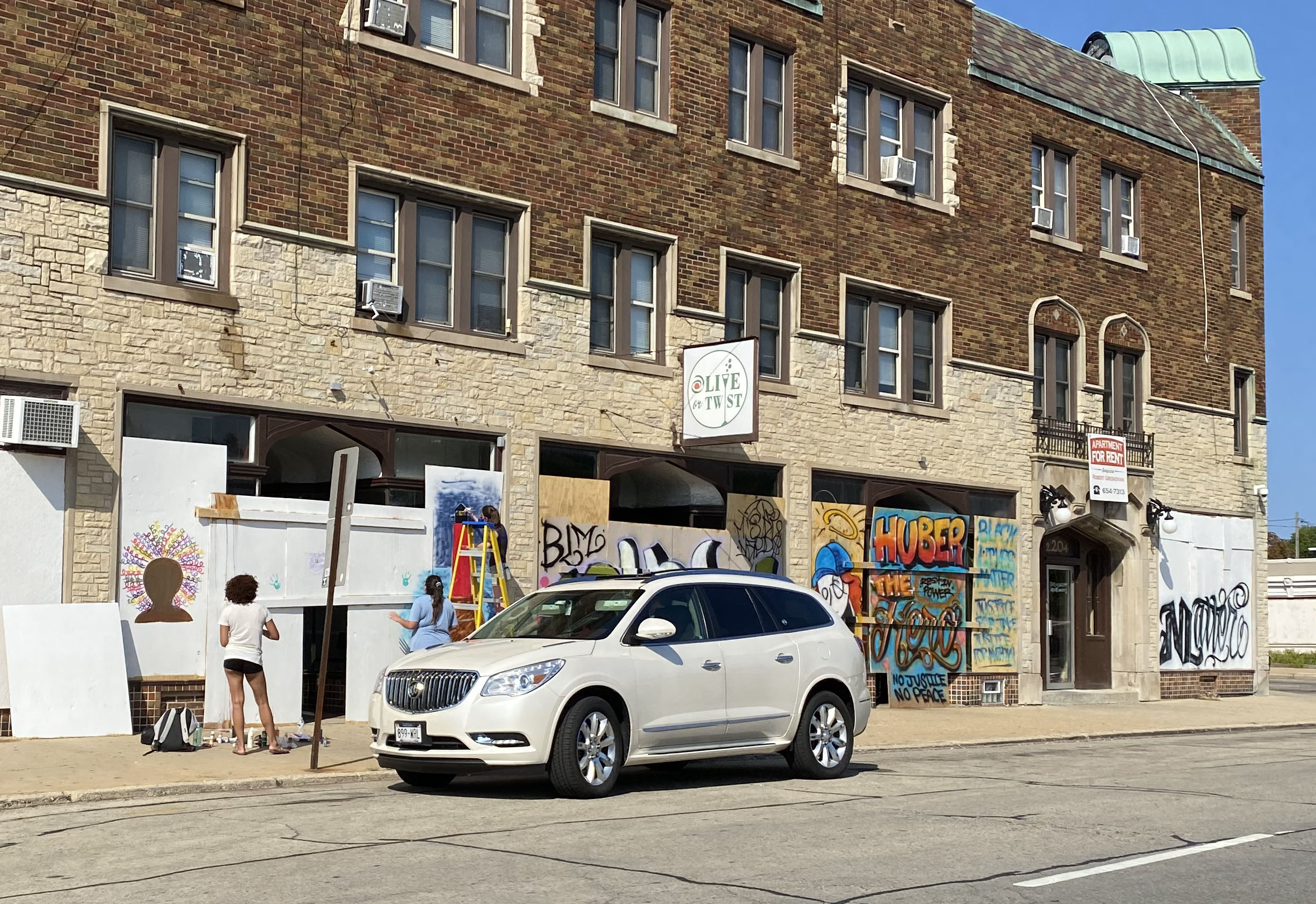
Residents paint a boarded-up building following unrest in 2020

The two-mile (3.2 km) downtown electric streetcar system was opened on June 17, 2000, and on September 22, 2014, the Kenosha city council approved a crosstown extension of the system incorporating the existing route between 48th and 61st Streets on both 6th and 8th Avenues.

In the aftermath of the August 2020 police shooting of Jacob Blake, protests, riots, and civil unrest occurred in Kenosha. Demonstrations were marked by daily peaceful protesting followed by confrontations with law enforcement and rioting, looting, vandalism, and arson at night. A state of emergency was declared on August 23, and the National Guard was activated the following day. On August 25, a controversial shooting occurred during the unrest, leading to a polarized response. Both then-President Donald Trump and then-Presidential candidate Joe Biden visited Kenosha.

Protests continued daily through August 29 with approximately 2,000 members of the National Guard assisting the city in restoring order. Damages exceeding $50 million occurred, with over 100 businesses affected.

In November 2021, Kenosha once again became the subject of worldwide attention as the jury trial of Kyle Rittenhouse, the defendant in the 2020 unrest shooting, commenced. As part of the city's emergency preparedness, over 500 members of the National Guard were activated ahead of the verdict. Judge Bruce Schroeder dismissed Rittenhouse's unlawful possession charge and the curfew violation charge for being legally unsupported, and a unanimous jury found Rittenhouse not guilty of the remaining charges. Following the verdict on November 19, some protests occurred in Kenosha but remained peaceful.

On December 7, 2021, "Carl the Kenosha Turkey", a turkey who had become a social media sensation and local icon, was hit by a vehicle and killed. The turkey was named the city's unofficial mascot in 2020 and was seen by some as a source of positivity as Kenosha faced hardships in 2020–2021.

=== Historic districts ===
Kenosha has 21 locations and three districts, Civic Center, Library Park and Third Avenue, listed on the National Register of Historic Places. The city has a Kenosha Landmarks Commission, and among the many local city-designated landmarks are the 1929 YMCA, the Manor House, the John McCaffary House, St. Matthew's Episcopal Church, the Washington Park Clubhouse, the Ritacca Triplex, the Ritacca Service Station, and the Justin Weed House.

== Geography ==
Kenosha is in southeastern Wisconsin, bordered by Lake Michigan to the east, the village of Somers to the north, the village of Bristol to the west, and the village of Pleasant Prairie to the south. Kenosha's passenger train station is the last stop on Chicago's Union Pacific North Metra line. Kenosha is 32 miles south of Milwaukee and 49 miles north of Chicago.

According to the United States Census Bureau, the city has a total area of 27.03 square miles (70.01 km^{2}), of which 26.93 square miles (69.75 km^{2}) is land and 0.10 square miles (0.26 km^{2}) is water.

=== Neighborhoods ===
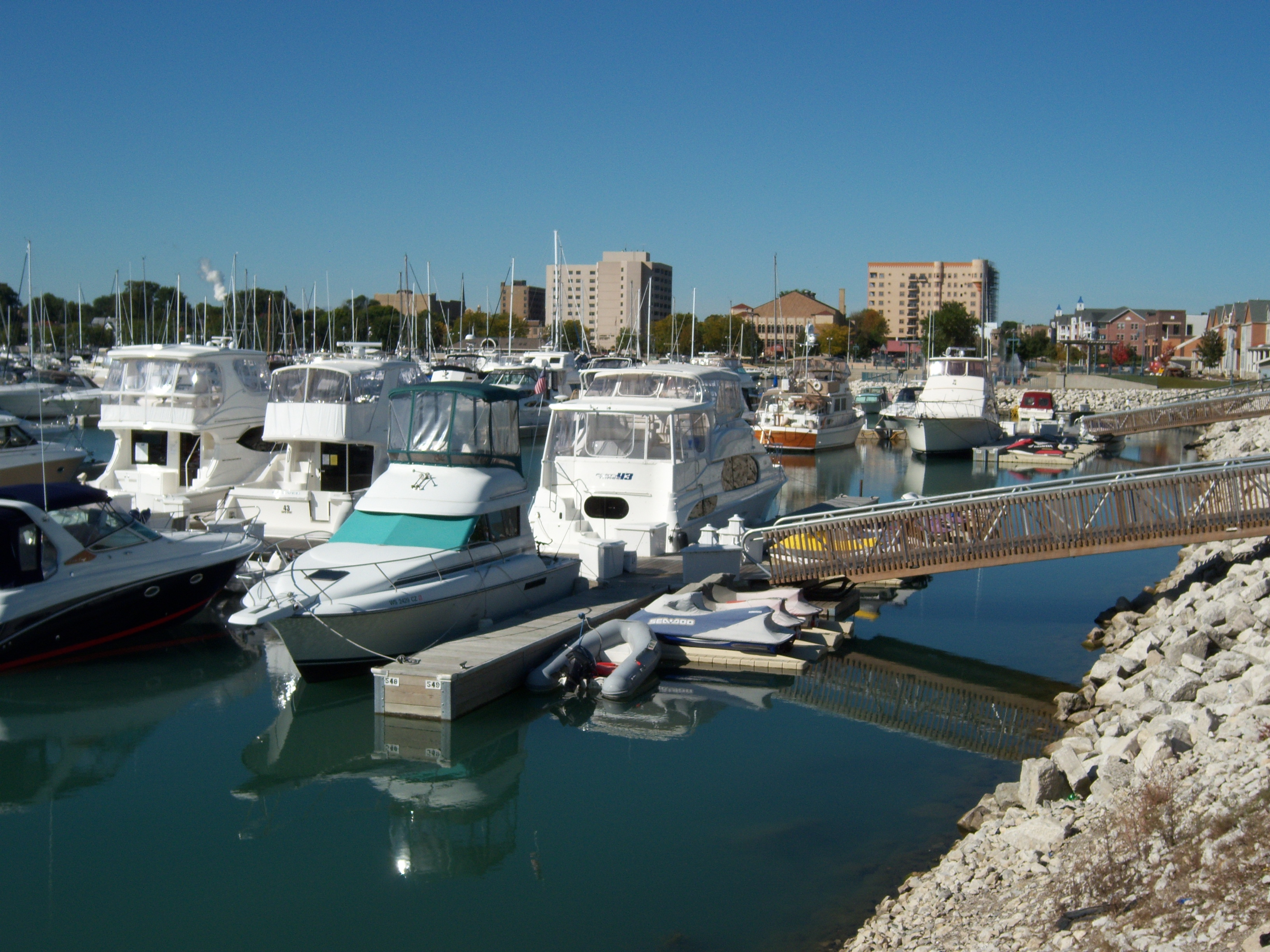
Kenosha's downtown marina

Kenosha is home to a mixture of blue and white collar workers as well as students who attend the local universities. Kenosha consists of neighborhoods divided into three regions – Downtown, Uptown, and West of I-94 (referred to by locals at "West of the I" or simply "the county"). The city's northside is home to both the University of Wisconsin–Parkside and Carthage College.

Kenosha's downtown is located along the Lake Michigan shoreline and consists of government buildings, parks, beaches, restaurants, shops, museums, and entertainment venues. The neighborhood of HarborPark is both a residential and commercial area. Directly south of the Downtown area is the neighborhood of Allendale.

Uptown Kenosha consists of a largely blue-collar population and is a mixture of locally owned businesses and residential areas. Prominent Uptown neighborhoods include Brass, Lincoln Park, and Wilson Heights.

=== Climate ===
Kenosha has a humid continental climate (Köppen: Dfa, bordering on Dfb) with warm summers and cold winters. The record high is 105 °F (41 °C), set in July 2012. The record low is −31 °F (−35 °C), set in January 1985. Heavy fall and winter snowstorms, including blizzards, are not uncommon. The city has experienced several record storms, including the January 1979 North American blizzard, during which approximately 19 inches (48 cm) of snow fell, and the 2011 Groundhog Day blizzard, which deposited 23.2 inches (59 cm) of snow.

Climate data for Kenosha, Wisconsin (1991–2020 normals, extremes 1944–present)
Month	Jan	Feb	Mar	Apr	May	Jun	Jul	Aug	Sep	Oct	Nov	Dec	Year
Record high °F (°C)	65 (18)	74 (23)	83 (28)	90 (32)	94 (34)	102 (39)	105 (41)	102 (39)	100 (38)	89 (32)	81 (27)	70 (21)	105 (41)
Mean maximum °F (°C)	51.4 (10.8)	54.1 (12.3)	66.7 (19.3)	77.9 (25.5)	84.7 (29.3)	90.8 (32.7)	94.1 (34.5)	91.7 (33.2)	87.9 (31.1)	79.2 (26.2)	66.3 (19.1)	55.1 (12.8)	95.5 (35.3)
Mean daily maximum °F (°C)	30.8 (−0.7)	34.1 (1.2)	43.1 (6.2)	52.7 (11.5)	63.6 (17.6)	73.3 (22.9)	79.7 (26.5)	78.5 (25.8)	71.9 (22.2)	60.3 (15.7)	47.3 (8.5)	35.9 (2.2)	55.9 (13.3)
Daily mean °F (°C)	24.0 (−4.4)	27.1 (−2.7)	35.8 (2.1)	45.0 (7.2)	55.1 (12.8)	65.1 (18.4)	71.9 (22.2)	71.1 (21.7)	64.0 (17.8)	52.4 (11.3)	40.1 (4.5)	29.3 (−1.5)	48.4 (9.1)
Mean daily minimum °F (°C)	17.1 (−8.3)	20.1 (−6.6)	28.5 (−1.9)	37.4 (3.0)	46.7 (8.2)	56.9 (13.8)	64.1 (17.8)	63.8 (17.7)	56.1 (13.4)	44.5 (6.9)	32.9 (0.5)	22.8 (−5.1)	40.9 (4.9)
Mean minimum °F (°C)	−5.1 (−20.6)	0.7 (−17.4)	10.5 (−11.9)	25.0 (−3.9)	36.5 (2.5)	45.9 (7.7)	55.0 (12.8)	55.1 (12.8)	42.2 (5.7)	30.1 (−1.1)	17.2 (−8.2)	2.5 (−16.4)	−9.1 (−22.8)
Record low °F (°C)	−31 (−35)	−23 (−31)	−9 (−23)	10 (−12)	26 (−3)	33 (1)	41 (5)	40 (4)	30 (−1)	20 (−7)	−5 (−21)	−29 (−34)	−31 (−35)
Average precipitation inches (mm)	1.92 (49)	1.83 (46)	2.67 (68)	4.19 (106)	4.12 (105)	4.13 (105)	3.41 (87)	3.68 (93)	3.53 (90)	3.51 (89)	2.42 (61)	2.19 (56)	37.60 (955)
Average snowfall inches (cm)	11.3 (29)	9.8 (25)	5.7 (14)	0.8 (2.0)	0.0 (0.0)	0.0 (0.0)	0.0 (0.0)	0.0 (0.0)	0.0 (0.0)	0.1 (0.25)	1.5 (3.8)	7.0 (18)	36.2 (92)
Average precipitation days (≥ 0.01 in)	10.3	8.5	9.7	12.2	12.3	10.6	9.0	9.6	8.6	9.8	9.5	9.5	119.6
Average snowy days (≥ 0.1 in)	6.6	5.2	2.7	0.5	0.0	0.0	0.0	0.0	0.0	0.0	1.2	4.1	20.3
Source: NOAA

Climate data for Kenosha, Wisconsin (Kenosha Regional Airport), 1991–2020 normals, extremes 1997–present
Month	Jan	Feb	Mar	Apr	May	Jun	Jul	Aug	Sep	Oct	Nov	Dec	Year
Record high °F (°C)	64 (18)	77 (25)	85 (29)	89 (32)	94 (34)	100 (38)	106 (41)	100 (38)	96 (36)	87 (31)	77 (25)	68 (20)	106 (41)
Mean maximum °F (°C)	50.9 (10.5)	52.2 (11.2)	69.1 (20.6)	81.0 (27.2)	87.7 (30.9)	91.5 (33.1)	93.4 (34.1)	91.7 (33.2)	89.4 (31.9)	80.5 (26.9)	67.1 (19.5)	56.3 (13.5)	95.2 (35.1)
Mean daily maximum °F (°C)	31.3 (−0.4)	34.8 (1.6)	45.4 (7.4)	57.3 (14.1)	69.0 (20.6)	78.8 (26.0)	83.8 (28.8)	81.7 (27.6)	74.8 (23.8)	62.5 (16.9)	48.5 (9.2)	36.6 (2.6)	58.7 (14.9)
Daily mean °F (°C)	23.8 (−4.6)	26.8 (−2.9)	36.6 (2.6)	47.1 (8.4)	58.1 (14.5)	67.8 (19.9)	72.7 (22.6)	71.2 (21.8)	63.9 (17.7)	52.7 (11.5)	40.1 (4.5)	29.5 (−1.4)	49.2 (9.5)
Mean daily minimum °F (°C)	16.4 (−8.7)	18.9 (−7.3)	27.9 (−2.3)	36.8 (2.7)	47.1 (8.4)	56.8 (13.8)	61.7 (16.5)	60.6 (15.9)	53.1 (11.7)	42.8 (6.0)	31.6 (−0.2)	22.4 (−5.3)	39.7 (4.3)
Mean minimum °F (°C)	−7.0 (−21.7)	−5.7 (−20.9)	7.5 (−13.6)	22.9 (−5.1)	32.6 (0.3)	43.5 (6.4)	48.9 (9.4)	48.0 (8.9)	38.8 (3.8)	25.9 (−3.4)	13.5 (−10.3)	1.2 (−17.1)	−12.0 (−24.4)
Record low °F (°C)	−28 (−33)	−15 (−26)	−13 (−25)	15 (−9)	24 (−4)	32 (0)	41 (5)	41 (5)	32 (0)	19 (−7)	4 (−16)	−16 (−27)	−28 (−33)
Average precipitation inches (mm)	1.19 (30)	1.07 (27)	2.03 (52)	3.63 (92)	3.52 (89)	3.69 (94)	3.35 (85)	3.56 (90)	3.36 (85)	2.90 (74)	2.05 (52)	1.53 (39)	31.88 (809)
Average precipitation days (≥ 0.01 in)	8.3	7.2	9.8	12.5	13.7	12.4	10.3	13.1	12.3	11.4	9.4	8.8	129.2
Source 1: NOAA
Source 2: National Weather Service (mean maxima/minima 2006–2020)

== Demographics ==
Historical population
Census	Pop.	Note	%±
1850	3,455		—
1860	3,990		15.5%
1870	4,309		8.0%
1880	5,039		16.9%
1890	6,532		29.6%
1900	11,606		77.7%
1910	21,371		84.1%
1920	40,472		89.4%
1930	50,262		24.2%
1940	48,765		−3.0%
1950	54,368		11.5%
1960	67,899		24.9%
1970	78,805		16.1%
1980	77,685		−1.4%
1990	80,352		3.4%
2000	90,352		12.4%
2010	99,218		9.8%
2020	99,986		0.8%
2024 (est.)	99,578		−0.4%
U.S. Decennial Census; 2010 2020

=== Racial and ethnic composition ===
Kenosha city, Wisconsin – Racial and ethnic composition Note: the US Census treats Hispanic/Latino as an ethnic category. This table excludes Latinos from the racial categories and assigns them to a separate category. Hispanics/Latinos may be of any race.
Race / Ethnicity (NH = Non-Hispanic)	Pop 2000	Pop 2010	Pop 2020	% 2000	% 2010	2020
White alone (NH)	71,686	68,967	62,835	79.34%	69.51%	62.84%
Black or African American alone (NH)	6,810	9,540	10,279	7.54%	9.62%	10.28%
Native American or Alaska Native alone (NH)	337	332	224	0.37%	0.33%	0.22%
Asian alone (NH)	686	1,637	1,843	0.96%	1.65%	1.84%
Native Hawaiian or Pacific Islander alone (NH)	37	48	49	0.04%	0.05%	0.05%
Other race alone (NH)	123	122	318	0.14%	0.12%	0.32%
Mixed race or Multiracial (NH)	1,488	2,441	4,788	1.65%	2.46%	4.79%
Hispanic or Latino (any race)	9,003	16,130	19,650	9.96%	16.26%	19.65%
Total	90,352	99,218	99,986	100.00%	100.00%	100.00%

=== 2020 census ===
As of the 2020 census, Kenosha had a population of 99,986. The population density was 3,529.6 inhabitants per square mile (1,362.8/km^{2}).

There were 41,641 housing units at an average density of 1,470.0 per square mile (567.6/km^{2}) and 39,282 households in the city; 5.7% of housing units were vacant, the homeowner vacancy rate was 1.2%, and the rental vacancy rate was 6.2%. Of all households, 31.3% had children under the age of 18 living in them, 39.1% were married-couple households, 20.6% had a male householder with no spouse or partner present, and 31.3% had a female householder with no spouse or partner present. About 31.3% of all households were made up of individuals, and 11.8% had someone living alone who was 65 years of age or older.

The median age was 36.1 years; 23.7% of residents were under the age of 18 and 13.8% were 65 years of age or older. For every 100 females there were 95.5 males, and for every 100 females age 18 and over there were 92.9 males age 18 and over.

99.9% of residents lived in urban areas and 0.1% lived in rural areas. The 2020 census population included 592 people incarcerated in adult correctional facilities and 1,790 people in student housing.

Racial composition as of the 2020 census
Race	Number	Percent
White	67,888	67.9%
Black or African American	10,822	10.8%
American Indian and Alaska Native	518	0.5%
Asian	1,906	1.9%
Native Hawaiian and Other Pacific Islander	65	0.1%
Some other race	7,268	7.3%
Two or more races	11,519	11.5%
Hispanic or Latino (of any race)	19,650	19.7%

=== 2023 United States Census Bureau American Community Survey one-year estimates ===
Racial Makeup of Kenosha (2023): 1. White alone (66.9%); 2. Black alone (8.77%); 3. Native American alone (0.02%); 4. Asian alone (0.83%); 5. Pacific Islander alone (0.00%); 6. Some other race alone (6.95%); 7. Two or more races (16.6%)	Racial Makeup of Kenosha treating Hispanics as a Racial Category (2023); NH=Non-Hispanic: 1. White NH (62.6%); 2. Black NH (7.91%); 3. Native American NH (0.02%); 4. Asian NH (0.83%); 5. Pacific Islander NH (0.00%); 6. Other race NH (0.17%); 7. Two or more races NH (6.89%); 8. Hispanic Any Race (21.6%)	Racial Makeup of Hispanics in Kenosha (2023): 1. White alone (19.8%); 2. Black alone (3.95%); 3. Native American alone (0.00%); 4. Asian alone (0.00%); 5. Pacific Islander alone (0.00%); 6. Other race alone (31.4%); 7. Two or more races (44.8%)

=== 2010 census ===
As of the census of 2010, there were 99,218 people, 37,376 households, and 24,090 families residing in the city. The population density was 3,684.3 inhabitants per square mile (1,422.5/km^{2}). There were 40,643 housing units at an average density of 1,509.2 per square mile (582.7/km^{2}). The racial makeup of the city was 77.1% White, 10.0% African American, 0.6% Native American, 1.7% Asian, 0.1% Pacific Islander, 6.8% from other races, and 3.8% from two or more races. Hispanic or Latino people of any race were 16.3% of the population.

There were 37,376 households, of which 36.8% had children under the age of 18 living with them, 42.9% were married couples living together, 15.9% had a female householder with no husband present, 5.7% had a male householder with no wife present, and 35.5% were non-families. 28.8% of all households were made up of individuals, and 9.7% had someone living alone who was 65 years of age or older. The average household size was 2.56 and the average family size was 3.17.

The median age in the city was 33.5 years. 26.8% of residents were under the age of 18; 10.9% were between the ages of 18 and 24; 28.3% were from 25 to 44; 23.2% were from 45 to 64; and 10.8% were 65 years of age or older. The gender makeup of the city was 49.1% male and 50.9% female.

The 2010 census reported that 51 percent of Kenosha residents moved in from other cities and states. The Chamber of Commerce attributed this to the city's museums, lakeshore attractions, cultural and work opportunities, its public-school system, transportation amenities, and relatively lower costs-of-living.

The importance of manufacturing jobs in Kenosha continues to diminish with only 11.7 percent or 7,769 of the total workforce of 66,362 area residents involved, a decline of 22 percent since 1990 and much lower than the statewide percentage of 16.4 percent.

The biggest surge in Kenosha employment by percentage has been in the white-collar workforce. From 1990 to 2017, the percentage of Kenosha's workforce in business and professional services grew nearly fivefold from 3.2% of the workforce to 11%, while statewide the trend was slightly more than double. The growth has been both to due new office developments in the city, but also due to new suburban developments as Illinois workers seek more affordable housing.

=== 2000 census ===
As of the census of 2000, there were 90,352 people, 34,411 households, and 22,539 families residing in the city. The population density was 3,795.1 inhabitants per square mile (1,465.3/km^{2}). There were 36,004 housing units at an average density of 1,512.3 per square mile (583.9/km^{2}). The racial makeup of the city was 83.6% White, 7.7% African American, 0.4% Native American, 1.0% Asian, <0.1% Pacific Islander, 4.8% from other races and 2.4% from two or more races. 10.0% of the population were Hispanic of any race. 25.5% were of German, 11.5% Italian, 7.1% Irish and 6.6% Polish ancestry.

There were 34,411 households, out of which 34.1% had children under the age of 18 living with them: 47.1% were married couples living together, 13.9% had a female householder with no husband present and 34.5% were non-families. 28.4% of all households were made up of individuals, and 10.3% had someone living alone who was 65 years of age or older. The average household size was 2.54 and the average family size was 3.13.

In the city, the population included 27.2% under the age of 18, 10.1% from 18 to 24, 31.5% from 25 to 44, 19.0% from 45 to 64, and 12.2% who were 65 years of age or older. The median age was 34 years. For every 100 females, there were 96.7 males. For every 100 females age 18 and over, there were 93.2 males.

=== Crime ===
The city's violent crime rate for 2018 was 338.18 per 100,000 people, a 15.94% decline from 2017. In 2019, there were 5 reported homicides and an overall 1,888 crimes per 100,000 people, 7.0% higher than the overall crime rate for Wisconsin but lower than the national average of 2,489 per 100,000 people.

Kenosha saw a notable increase in its homicide rate in 2021, with 14 recorded; nearly triple the city's average. The recorded homicide rate dropped in 2022, with 7 recorded that year.

== Economy ==
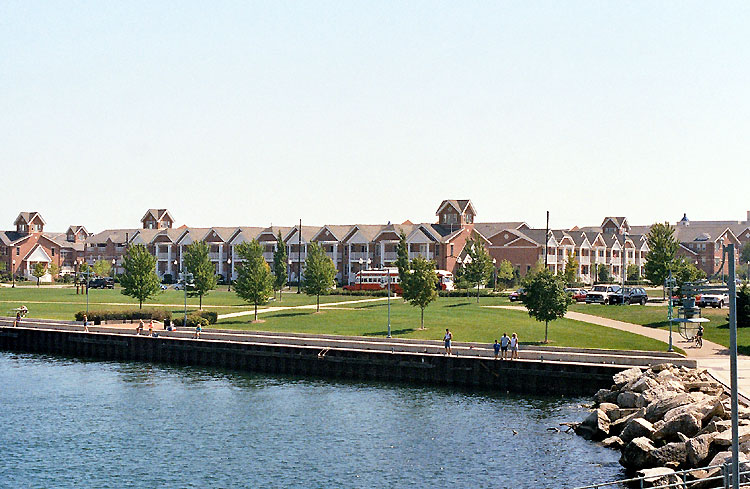
Harbor Park and the surrounding residential area. Nearly 90% of Kenosha's lakefront is dedicated to public use and is a major contributor to the city's economy.

Kenosha's economy is fueled by its position within the Chicago-Milwaukee corridor. Nearly half of Kenosha's workforce commutes outside of Kenosha County to their employers. The Chicago-area commuter rail network Metra has a route between Downtown Chicago and Kenosha. A 2016 study found that Kenosha's "out-commuters most likely work for positions in healthcare, manufacturing, professional/scientific and technical services. The majority of occupations included management, business/financial, and office/administrative support position", and 73 percent of out-commuters have a bachelor's degree or a higher level of education. Due to lower housing costs compared to other parts of the Chicago metropolitan area, Kenosha is a popular relocation area those wanting to benefit from high paying jobs and a lower cost of living. In January 2026, Realtor.com named Kenosha the hottest housing market in the United States for a second month in a row, attracting roughly 2.6 times the national average views per property.

Snap-on Tools world headquarters and Jockey International corporate headquarters are in Kenosha. Kenosha has a number of light industrial and distribution companies in outlying business parks. Amazon, Rustoleum, Uline, Associated Wholesale Grocers, and others have warehouses and distribution centers located in Kenosha. In 2022, Square Roots farm opened a fully indoor hydroponic facility within refurbished shipping containers in Kenosha. It is expected to be able to grow 2.4 million packages of fresh produce annually for distribution to the surrounding Chicago metro area and into the Milwaukee metro area.

Tourists spent an estimated $196.6 million in Kenosha County in 2015, with the county ranking fourth in the state in tourist money generated.

Downtown Kenosha sits along the Lake Michigan lakefront. In recent years, organizations such as Downtown Kenosha Inc. (DKI) manage the day-to-day economic development efforts, business support and promotional activities for the district. In 2023, a $450 million development to the downtown area was approved by the city council. The development plan will include thousands of apartments, condominiums, office buildings, retail spaces, hotels, and government buildings all within a nine-block radius.

Downtown Kenosha is home to the Kenosha HarborMarket, a European-style farmer's market held mid-May through mid-October on 2nd Ave bisected by the 56th Street boulevard streetcar line. It hosts stalls with local food products and artisan creations. In addition, the downtown area has a collection of over 50 restaurants, bars, breweries, and shops of various kinds. Frank's Diner, which has been an attraction in downtown Kenosha since 1926, is the oldest diner in the United States and has been featured twice on Guy Fieri's Diners, Drive-Ins and Dives, once in 2007 and again in 2021. Residential developments have also provided added condominiums and apartments.

Near downtown, the Kenosha Public Museum System includes the main Kenosha Public Museum, the Dinosaur Discovery Museum in association with Carthage College and the Smithsonian, and the Kenosha Civil War Museum. On Simmons Island, the Kenosha History Center and adjacent Maritime Museum offer memorabilia from the city's nautical past.

In February 2020, Wisconsin Governor Tony Evers announced $10 million in state funding toward the proposed Kenosha STEM Innovation Center within the Kenosha Innovation Neighborhood (KIN), which is a currently planned 60,000 sq. ft. building to be constructed on the empty 107 acre site of the former Chrysler factory. It will serve as a multi-purpose building dedicated to education, workforce development, and entrepreneurial opportunities. In December 2020, the city announced a plan for the KIN. In July 2021, the federal government awarded Kenosha $4.9 million in federal CARES Act funds toward the neighborhood, and in November, Mayor John Antaramian announced that Lakeview Technology Academy would relocate to the KIN. In March 2022, Evers officially announced $15 million in funding toward the KIN, which is expected to take 8–10 years to be fully completed and will include the collaboration of UW-Parkside, Carthage College, Gateway Technical College, and Herzing University.

== Arts and culture ==
=== Cuisine ===
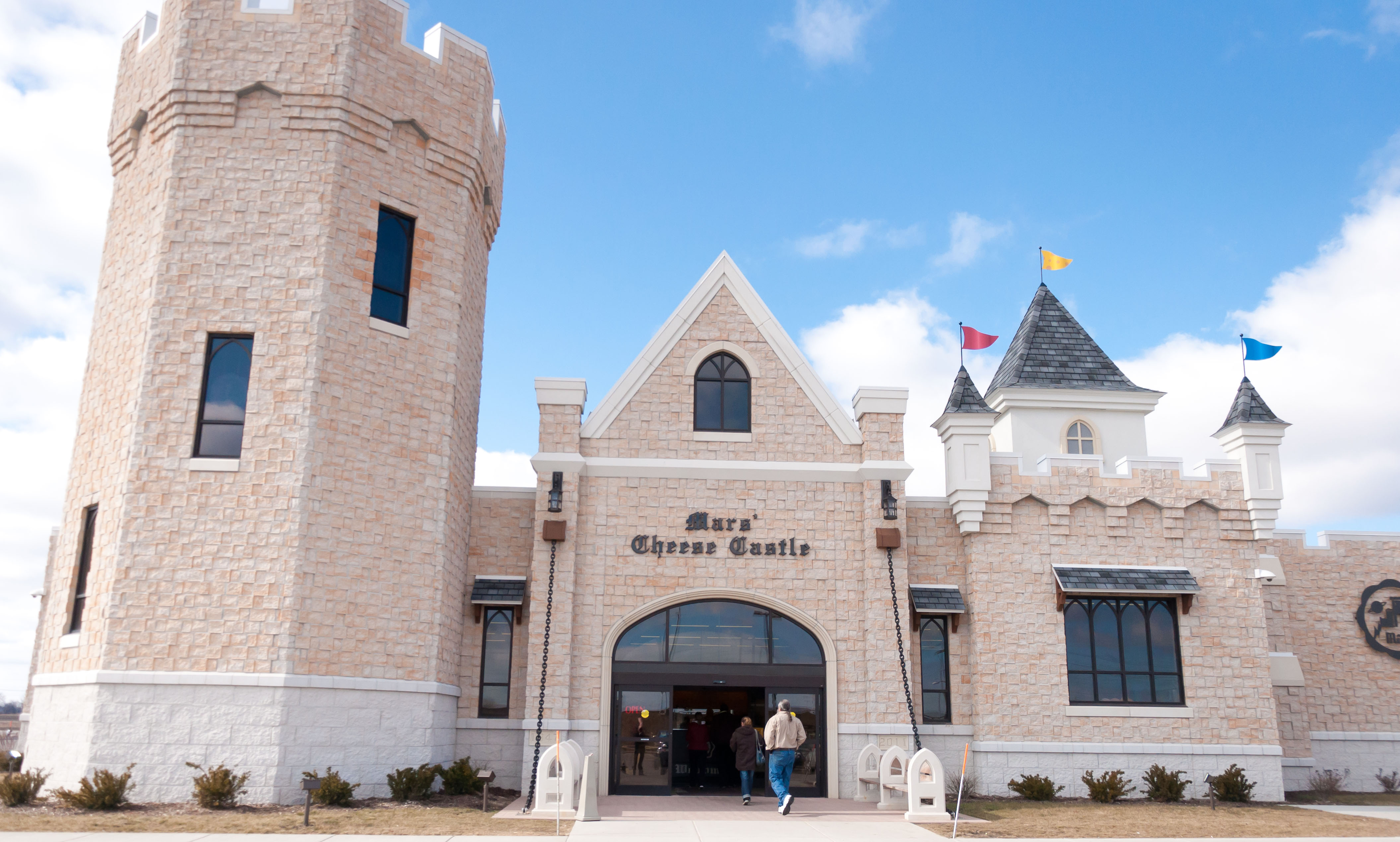
Mars Cheese Castle, located along Interstate 94, is a popular tourist destination in Kenosha.

Kenosha's cuisine mirrors common food culture throughout Wisconsin. It is home to a variety of restaurants including multiple supper clubs and German-American venues. Additionally, the city is home to two award-winning drive-in burger stands, The Spot and Big Star. Mars Cheese Castle, a "cheese landmark", is also located in Kenosha. The city has the highest concentration of Italian-Americans in Wisconsin, and as such is rife with Italian-American cuisine, including many pizza restaurants and perhaps the most well-known Italian grocery and delicatessen in Wisconsin, Tenuta's.

In recent years, Kenosha became home to multiple craft breweries, and in 2021 hosted the Great Lakes Brew Fest.

=== Festivals ===
Kenosha is home to a number of summer festivals including the Outta Sight Kite Flight, Taste of Wisconsin, Pike River Rendezvous (a historical reenactment), the Kenosha Classic Cruise-In Car Show, Celebrate America (Fourth of July event), Food Folks & Spokes (a cycling event), Cheese-A-Palooza, and the Border War Beer Fest (brewers from Wisconsin and Illinois competing for best beer).

Since 2017, Kenosha has been the host of Tribute Island, a three-day music festival located at Simmons Island. It features many of the top tribute bands from the Midwest, over 50 bands in total performing on five stages.

=== Libraries ===
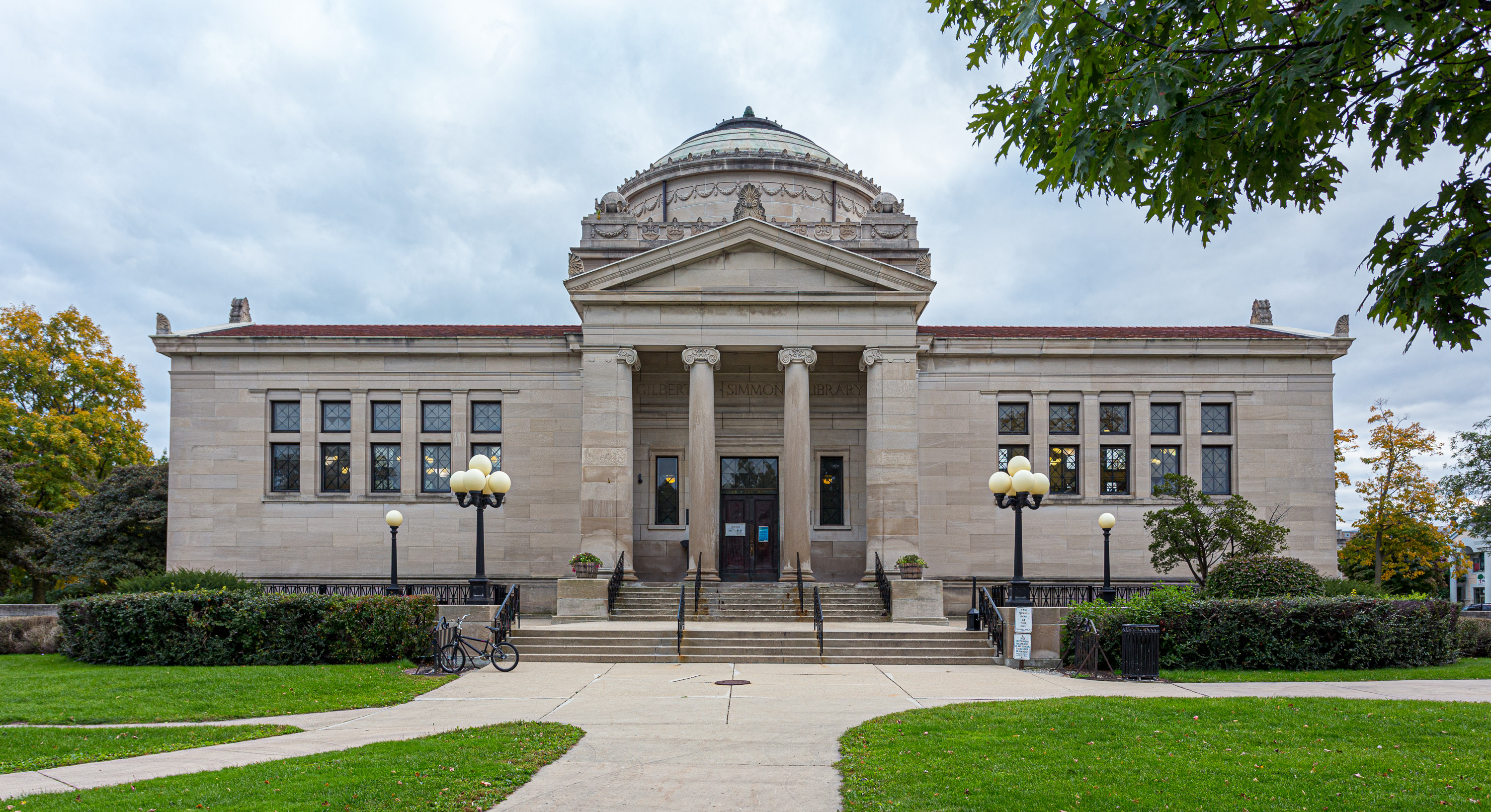
Gilbert M. Simmons Memorial Library, part of the Kenosha Public Library

The Kenosha Public Library, which is part of the Kenosha County Library System, operates in five locations throughout the city: Kids@Uptown Lofts, Northside Neighborhood Library, Simmons Neighborhood Library, Southwest Neighborhood Library, and the Uptown Neighborhood Library. Daniel H. Burnham designed the 1900 Beaux-Arts Gilbert M. Simmons Memorial Library, which is listed on the National Register of Historic Places.

=== Museums ===
Kenosha's four downtown museums, the Kenosha Public Museum, the Civil War Museum and the Dinosaur Discovery Museum, and the Kenosha Historical Center are Smithsonian Institution affiliates.

Completed in 2001, the Kenosha Public Museum is on the Lake Michigan shoreline. Its main exhibit is a prehistoric woolly mammoth skeleton uncovered in western Kenosha in 1992. Cut-marks on its bones indicate that the animals were butchered by humans using stone tools. Carbon dating indicates their age to be 12,500 radiocarbon years old or 14,500 calendar years old, one thousand radiocarbon years earlier than the previously accepted presence of humans in the Americas. The museum also displays other ice age and fine art exhibits. A second permanent exhibit on local ecosystems and the history of museums and science opened in 2019.

The Kenosha History Center is adjacent to the 1917 city water treatment plant on Simmons Island adjoining the 1866 Kenosha Light Station. It showcases the history of Kenosha from the time of Native American settlements and the first European settlements to the present day. The 1906 Kenosha North Pier Light sits just east.

Kenosha's 59,000-square-foot (5,500 m^{2}) Civil War Museum opened on June 13, 2008. The main exhibit, "The Fiery Trial", opened September 15, 2008. It is a 15,000-square-foot (1,400 m^{2}) exhibit offering an interactive experience of the role of six Midwestern states before, during, and after the American Civil War.

The Dinosaur Discovery Museum, designated a federal repository, opened in August 2006 in the historic Old Post Office adjoining the 56th Street streetcar line at Tenth Avenue, and includes an on-site paleontology laboratory operated through the Carthage College Institute of Paleontology.

A maritime museum is located within the restored 1866 Southport Light and Lighthouse Keeper's cottage on Simmons Island.

=== Music ===
Summer band performances have been performed by Kenosha Pops Concert Band at Kenosha's Sesquicentennial Bandshell in Pennoyer Park since 1988. The Music of the Stars radio program originated in Kenosha in 1992. The Kenosha Symphony Orchestra performs concerts in the Ralph J. Houghton Performance Center at Walter Reuther Central High School in downtown Kenosha. Since 2002, the outdoor Peanut Butter and Jam Concert Series has been held every Thursday in July and August at Veterans Memorial Park.

Lincoln Park Live! concerts began in 2005 at Lincoln Park. A number of outdoor jazz events are performed throughout the summer such as HarborPark Jazz.

Bands that have originated in Kenosha include Electric Hellfire Club, Lazarus A.D., Jungle Rot, and Product of Hate.

== Sports ==
The city's oldest sporting club, the Kenosha Yacht Club, was established in 1912.

Kenosha was home to the short lived Kenosha Maroons NFL franchise in 1924. They folded after going 0–4–1. It was also the home of the Kenosha Cardinals, a semi-professional football team between 1937 and 1941 which played at Lake Front Stadium at 58th Street and Third Avenue. Today, Kenosha is home to one semi-professional football team formed in 2007, the Kenosha Cougars. They play in the Northern Lights Football League (NLFL). The Bradford High School Red Devils won a state football championship in 2011. The Tremper High School Trojans have won three state championships – in 1979, 1980, and 1991.

Several baseball teams have played at Simmons Field on the city's south side, including the Kenosha Comets, charter members of the All-American Girls Professional Baseball League who played in the league from 1943 to 1951. Kenosha was also home to the Frontier League's Kenosha Mammoths in 2003, and the Single-A Kenosha Twins from 1984 to 1992. It is currently home to the Kenosha Kingfish, a collegiate baseball team in the Northwoods League, which played its first game on May 31, 2014, and in 2015 won their first championship. In 2020, it was also home to the K-Town Bobbers, featured in a 26-game "Kenosha Series" against the Kenosha Kingfish in July 2020 as part of the NWL "Pod" system of play adopted for 2020.

In 2022, Kenosha became the home of the Kenosha United F.C. Premier Arena Soccer League. They play their home games in nearby Sturtevant, Wisconsin.

== Parks and recreation ==
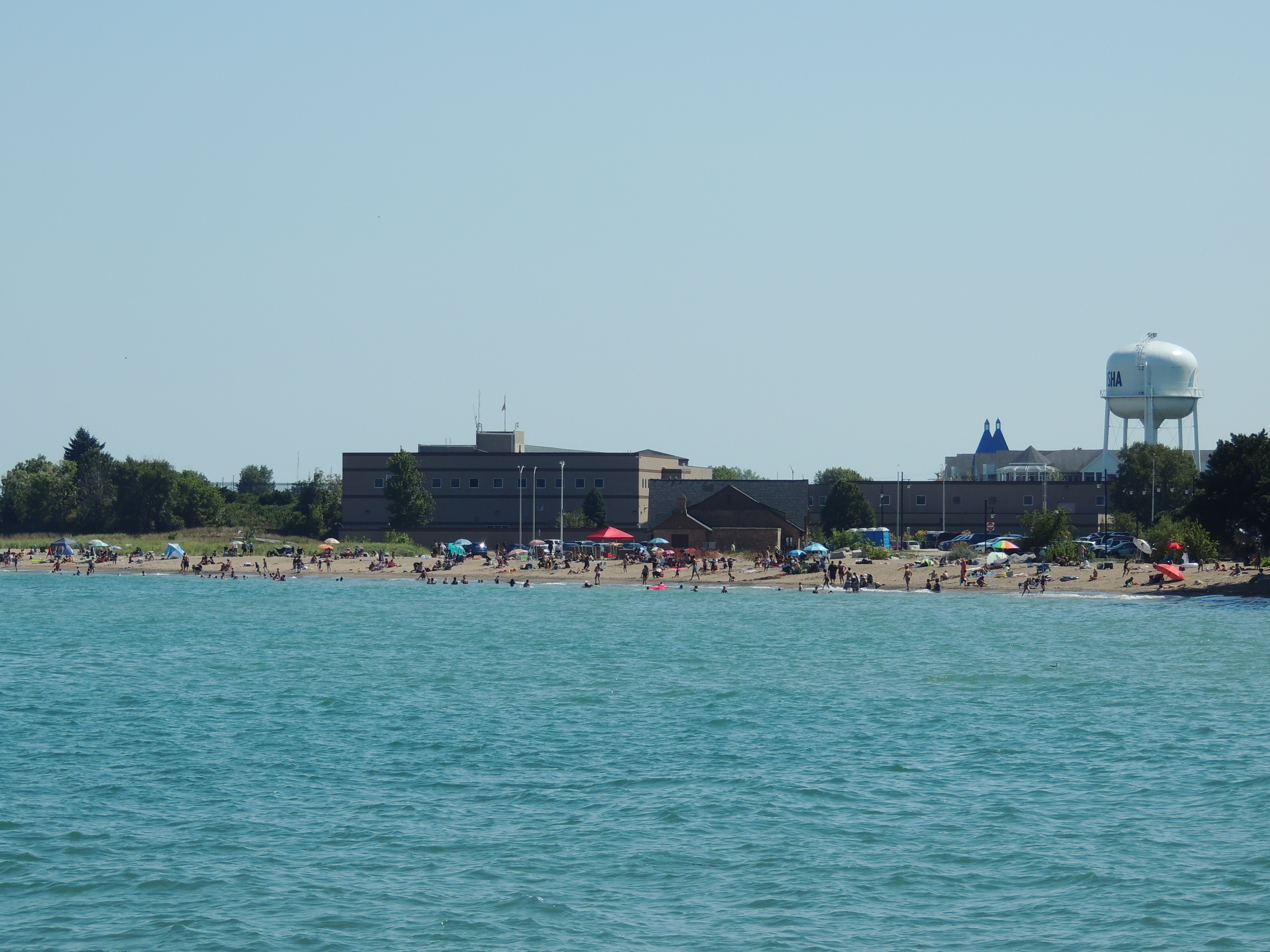
Simmons Island Beach from Lake Michigan

Kenosha has 8 miles (13 km) of Lake Michigan shoreline frontage, nearly all of which is public. The city has 74 municipal parks, totaling 781.52 acres (3.1627 km^{2}).

Kenosha's Washington Park includes the oldest operating velodrome in the United States (opened in 1927) at Washington Bowl. The Kenosha Velodrome Association sponsors American Track Cycling sanctioned races and training sessions at the "Bowl" throughout the summer. Races are held on Tuesday evenings from mid-May through August. Free seating is available on the inside of the track, and on important race days concessions are available.

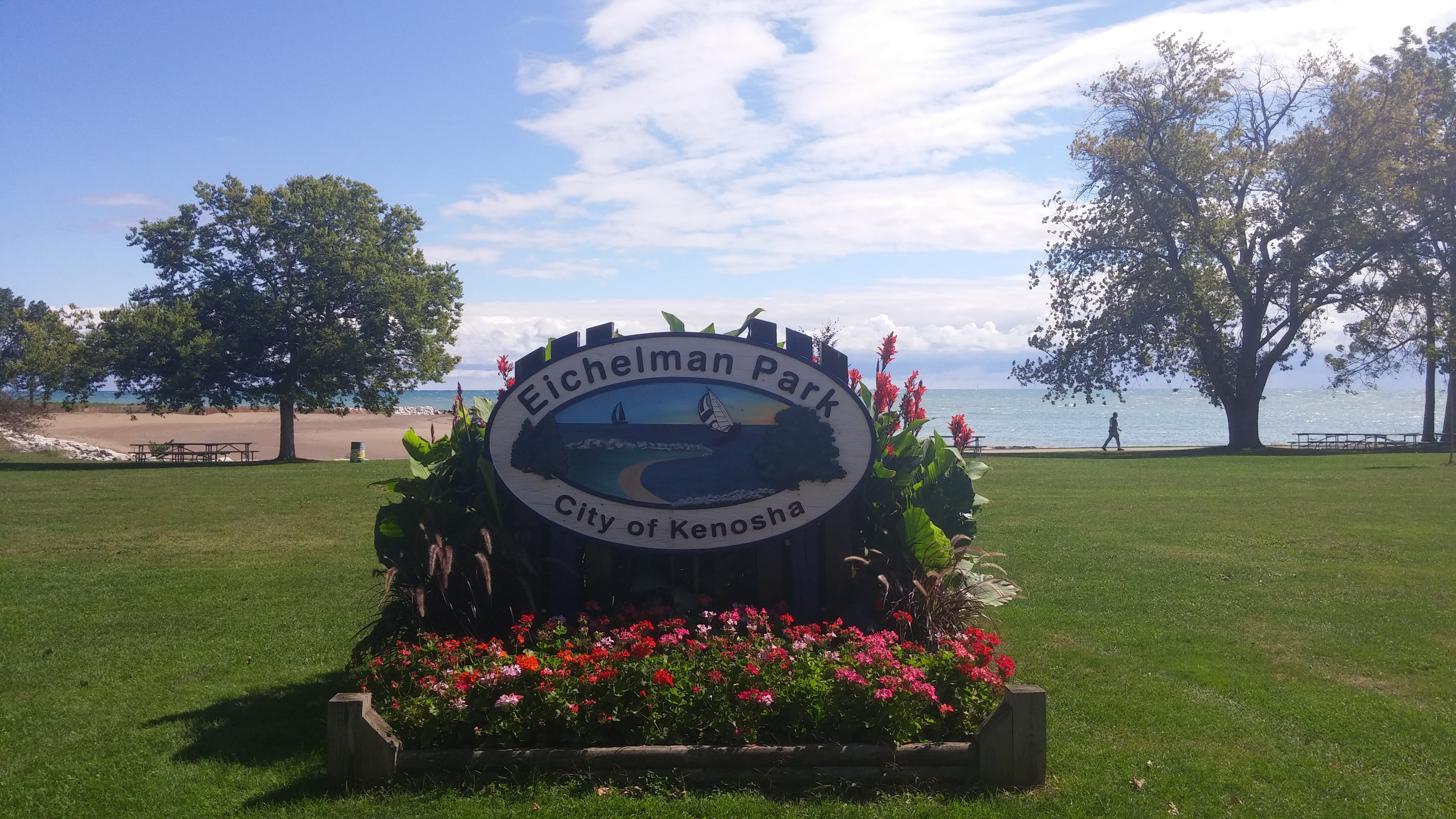
Eichelman Park, along with Wolfenbüttel Park, are located south of Southport Marina.

Library Park is home to a statue of Abraham Lincoln by Charles Henry Niehaus as well as a veterans-memorial statue ("Winged Victory") by the Italian sculptor Decco.

Petrifying Springs Park is located on the northside of Kenosha, with parts extending into the neighboring village of Somers. Developed within a northern hardwood forest, the 350-acre park includes hiking trails, an 18-hole golf course, and a Biergarten.

Kenosha has been a Tree City USA since 1982.

=== Beaches ===
- Simmons Island Park and Beach, 28 acres (11 ha)
- Alford Park and Beach (three sections: North, East, and West), 57 acres (23 ha)
- Eichelman Park and Beach, 11 acres (4.5 ha)
- Pennoyer Park and Beach, 39 acres (16 ha)
- Southport Park and Beach, 24 acres (9.7 ha)

=== Golf ===
The Washington Park Golf Course was dedicated on February 18, 1922, and its 1937 English-cottage clubhouse is a city landmark. Most recently, new private courses have opened, including The Club at Strawberry Creek.

=== Cycling ===
Kenosha's Library Park is the home of Food Folks and Spokes, a festival with food booths, entertainment, and a bicycle race that is the first leg of the Tour of America's Dairyland. It was formerly part of the International Cycling Classic's "Superweek". Kenosha is home to the Washington Park Velodrome, the longest-operating 333-meter track; it opened in 1927.

== Government ==
=== Mayor ===
Kenosha has an elected mayor, who is the chief executive, and an appointed city administrator, who is the chief operating officer. The mayor is elected every four years. The city's Common Council consists of 17 aldermen from Kenosha's 17 districts (each district having several wards), elected for two-year terms in even-numbered years. The current mayor of Kenosha is David Bogdala, since 2024. He succeeded John Antaramian, the longest-serving chief executive in the city's history, who served as mayor from 1992 to 2008 and from 2016 until 2024.

=== Politics ===
Kenosha is represented by Bryan Steil (R) in the United States House of Representatives, and by Ron Johnson (R) and Tammy Baldwin (D) in the United States Senate. Robert Wirch (D) represents Kenosha in the Wisconsin State Senate, and Tip McGuire (D) and Ben DeSmidt (D) represent Kenosha in the Wisconsin State Assembly.

== Education ==
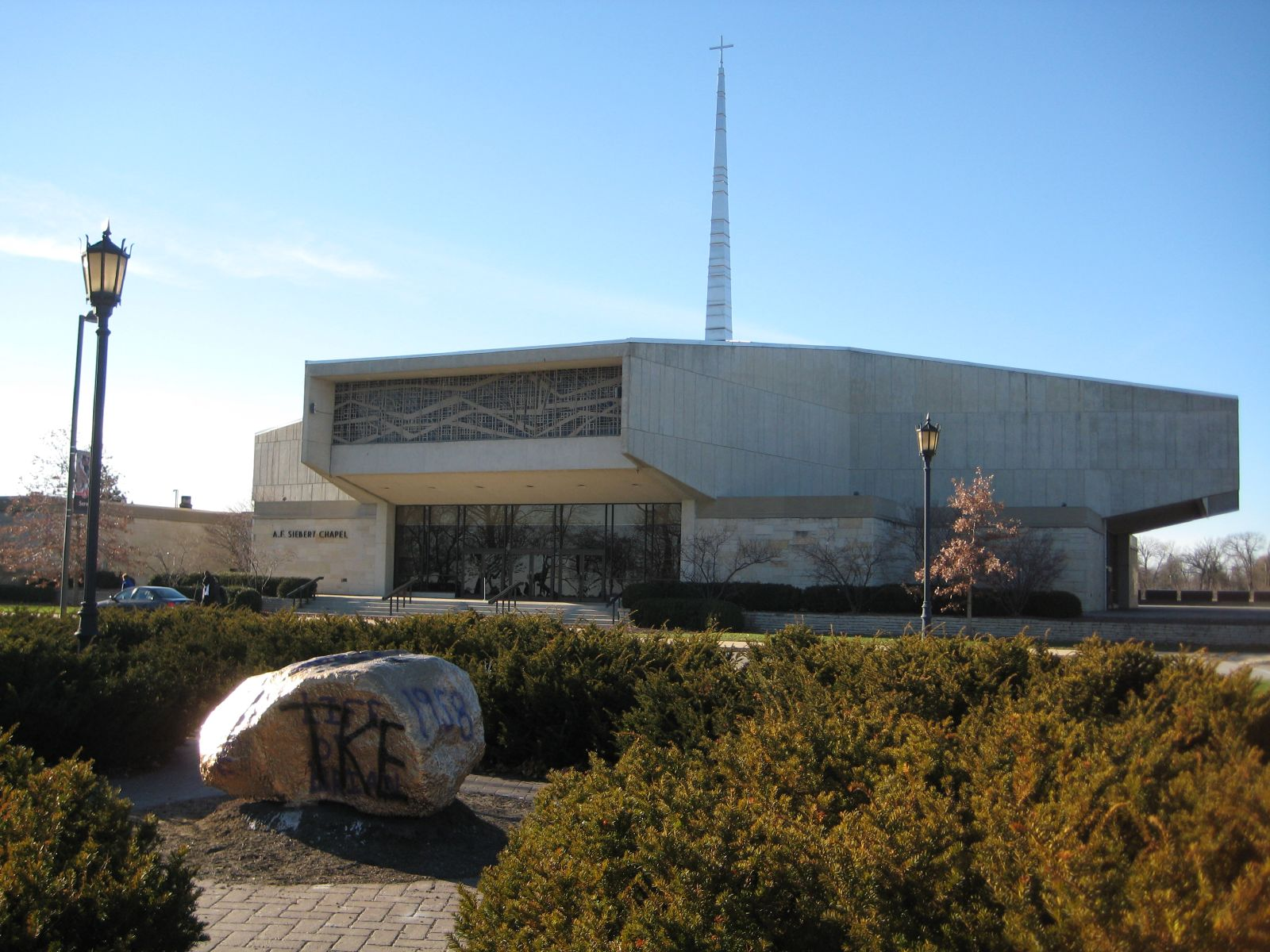
Siebert Chapel, Carthage College

=== Public schools ===
The Kenosha Unified School District operates 16 public elementary schools, four middle schools, seven choice schools (among them LakeView Technology Academy, Reuther Central High School, and Harborside Academy, the latter a research school that uses the Expeditionary Learning Outward Bound model and was funded by the Bill and Melinda Gates Foundation), one specialty school, and three comprehensive high schools: Mary D. Bradford High School, George Nelson Tremper High School, and Indian Trail High School and Academy.

Kenosha School of Technology-Enhanced Curriculum is an independent public charter school serving grades K-12.

=== Private schools ===
Kenosha's private schools include St. Joseph Catholic Academy, All Saints Catholic School, Kenosha Lutheran Academy, Christ Lutheran Academy, Kenosha Montessori School, Shoreland Lutheran High School, and Christian Life School. At the beginning of the 2011–2012 school year, St. Mary's and Our Lady of the Holy Rosary of Pompeii schools became campuses of All Saints Catholic School. Both campuses operate as the same school with the same principal. St. Mark's and St. Joseph High School have also conjoined into Saint Joseph Catholic Academy.

=== Higher education ===
Kenosha is home to the public University of Wisconsin–Parkside with over 4,000 students, the private Carthage College with over 2,500 students, and the Kenosha campus of Gateway Technical College. Herzing University also maintains campuses in Kenosha.

== Media ==
The primary newspaper of Kenosha County is the Kenosha News, a broadsheet with circulation of around 23,000 copies. Happenings Magazine is an ad-supported entertainment publication distributed at local businesses since 1978. They also publish The Smart Reader, Homes Plus, and other seasonal event-orientated magazines.

Kenosha is considered as part of the Milwaukee television market by A.C. Nielsen. However, due to the huge influx of commuters to Chicago, Charter Spectrum's Kenosha system carries both Chicago and Milwaukee. Arbitron classifies Kenosha as part of the Chicago radio market. Five major radio stations broadcast from Kenosha: WLIP (CBS Radio) 1050 AM, Gateway Technical College's WGTD (91.1 FM), a member station of the Wisconsin Public Radio News & Classical Music Network, rock WIIL (95.1 FM) and classic hits WWDV (96.9 FM), which simulcasts Chicago-based WDRV (97.1 FM). The Kenosha Convention and Visitors Bureau operates WPUR937 (1180 AM), a low-power tourist information station.

WPXE (channel 55), the Ion Television owned-and-operated station for the Milwaukee market, is Kenosha's only locally-licensed television station, though in reality it only mentions Kenosha in its legal IDs. Its transmitter is located with the Milwaukee PBS tower on Milwaukee's north side, and its studios are based in suburban Glendale, thus it serves the entire Milwaukee television market. Kenosha is served by several Chicago-based television and radio stations.

== Infrastructure ==
=== Transportation ===
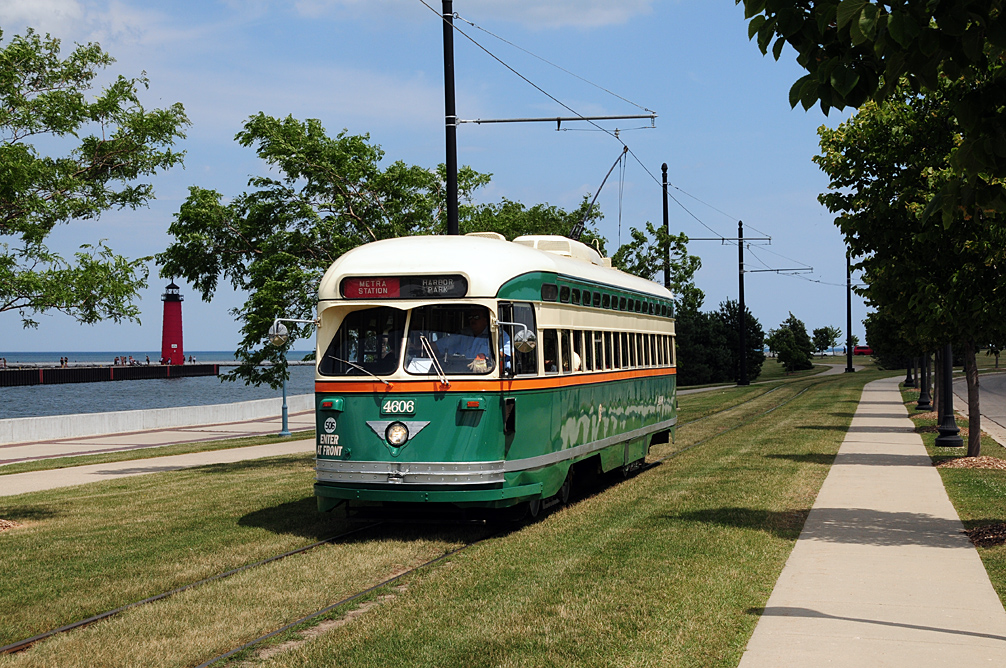
A streetcar passing the Kenosha North Pier Lighthouse

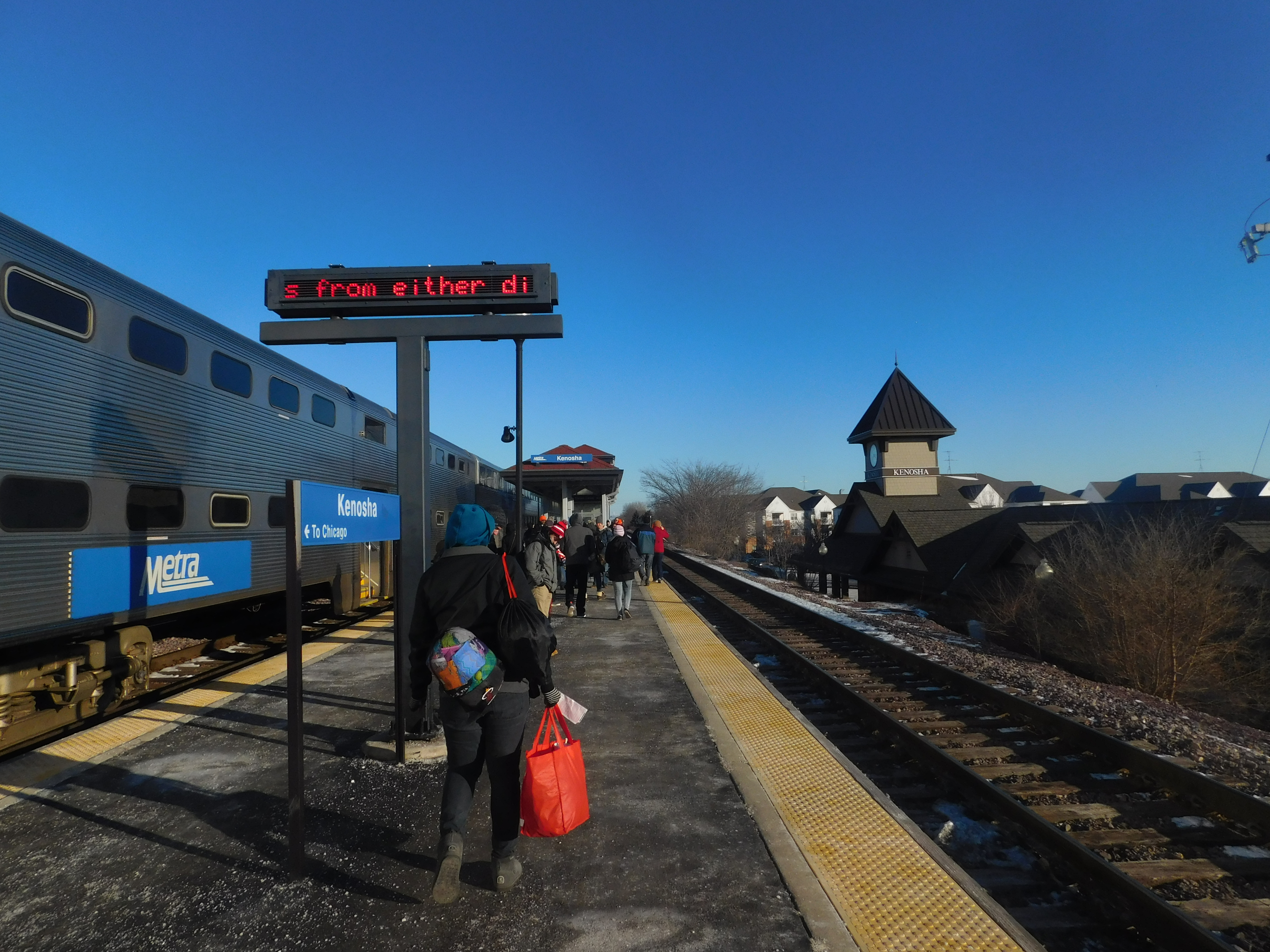
Kenosha station is served by Metra commuter rail to Chicago.

According to Walk Score, Kenosha is a largely "car dependent" city, with an overall walk score of 45/100, and has "minimal biking infrastructure", with an overall bike score of 49/100, though its downtown central business district has much higher scores, 84/100 and 72/100, respectively. Metra, the Chicago metropolitan area commuter rail network, has a line between downtown Chicago and Kenosha. Kenosha Regional Airport (KENW) serves the city and surrounding communities.

Since June 2000, a 2-mile (3.2 km) streetcar line has served the downtown area and HarborPark, connecting the Metra station with downtown and several area parks. Kenosha is one of the smallest cities in America with any type of streetcar system today. In addition to its streetcar line, Kenosha has a city bus network with eight routes. Kenosha was the first city to color-code transit routes (with the Blue, Green, Red, and Orange Lines), and also the first city to use electric trolley buses in full transit service, both occurring on February 14, 1932.

Major highways in Kenosha include:

- I-41 / I-94 / US 41 – Milwaukee, Chicago
- WIS 50
- WIS 31 (Green Bay Road)
- WIS 32 (Sheridan Road)
- WIS 158
- WIS 165

Kenosha has been served by rail service to and from Chicago since May 19, 1855, when the predecessors to the Chicago and North Western Railway, the Milwaukee and Chicago Railway Company (originally the Illinois Parallel Railroad) and the original "Lake Shore Railroad" (later the Green Bay, Milwaukee and Chicago Railway) were officially joined with great ceremony just south of today's 52nd Street. Today, the former C&NW line is operated by the Union Pacific Railroad while the former Milwaukee Road line is operated by the Soo Line Railroad, a division of the Canadian Pacific Railway. Although some Union Pacific North Line trains terminate and originate in Kenosha, most terminate at Waukegan, Illinois, to the south of Kenosha.

=== Health care ===
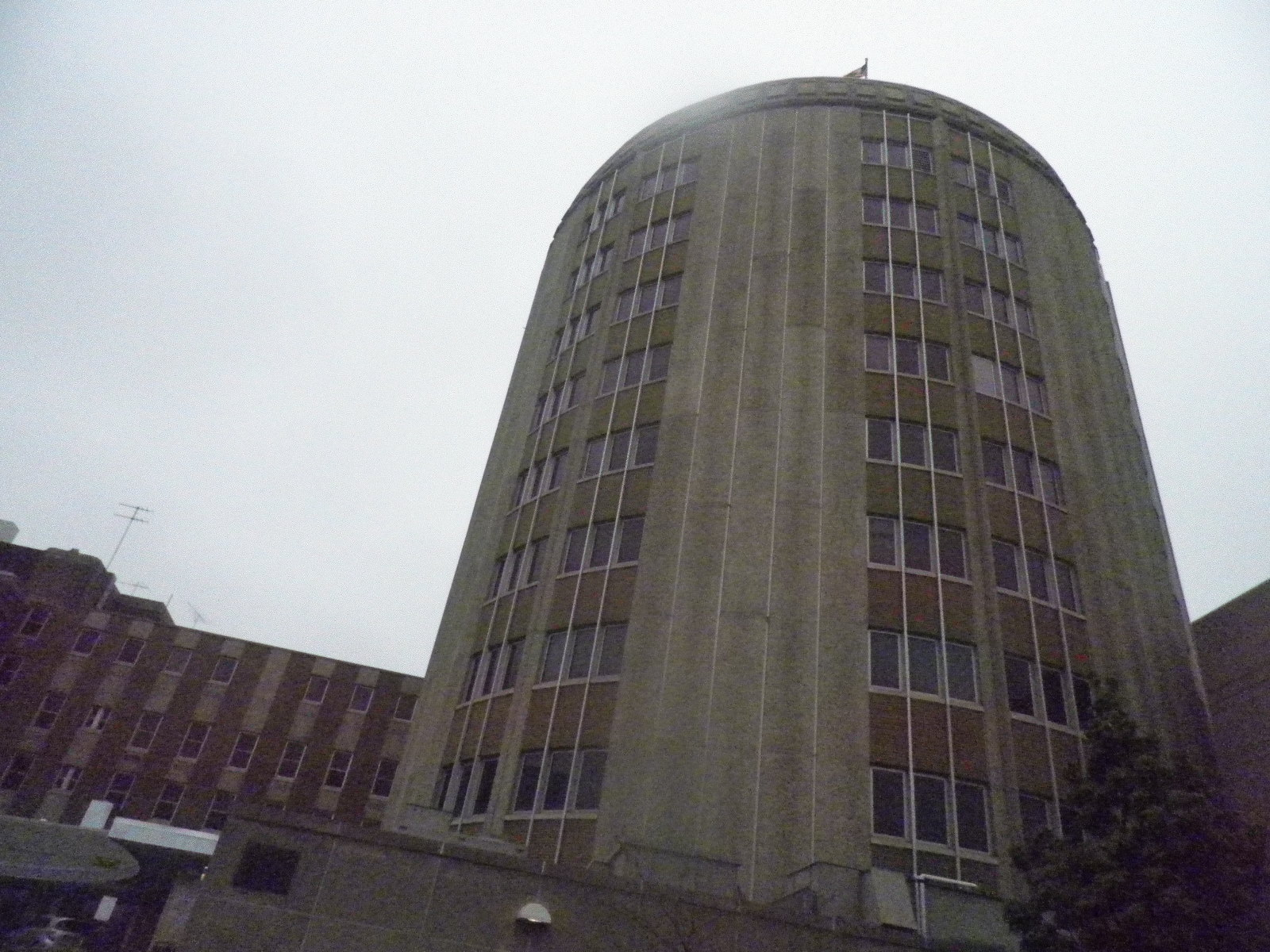
Kenosha Hospital's Palmer Recovery Unit

Kenosha has two hospitals: the Froedtert South Kenosha Medical Center Campus downtown and the Aurora Medical Center at the extreme western edge of the city limits.

=== Public safety ===
The Kenosha Police Department is responsible for the law enforcement in Kenosha since 1850, and is housed in the Kenosha Public Safety building. The Kenosha County Courthouse and Jail were added to the National Register of Historic Places in 1982. The jail and a separate facility, the Kenosha County Detention Center (KCDC), are operated by the sheriff's department. The Kenosha Correctional Center, a minimum security state prison, is also located in Kenosha and is under the operation of the Wisconsin Department of Corrections.

In August 2020, during the Kenosha unrest, a probation and parole building utilized by the Division of Community Corrections was burned down by rioters.

== Sister cities ==
Kenosha's sister cities are:

- Cosenza, Italy (since 1979)
- Douai, France (since 1981)
- Quezon City, Philippines (since 1986)
- Wolfenbüttel, Germany (since 1970)

== See also ==
- List of mayors of Kenosha, Wisconsin
- Kenosha unrest
