= Kenosha Regional Airport =

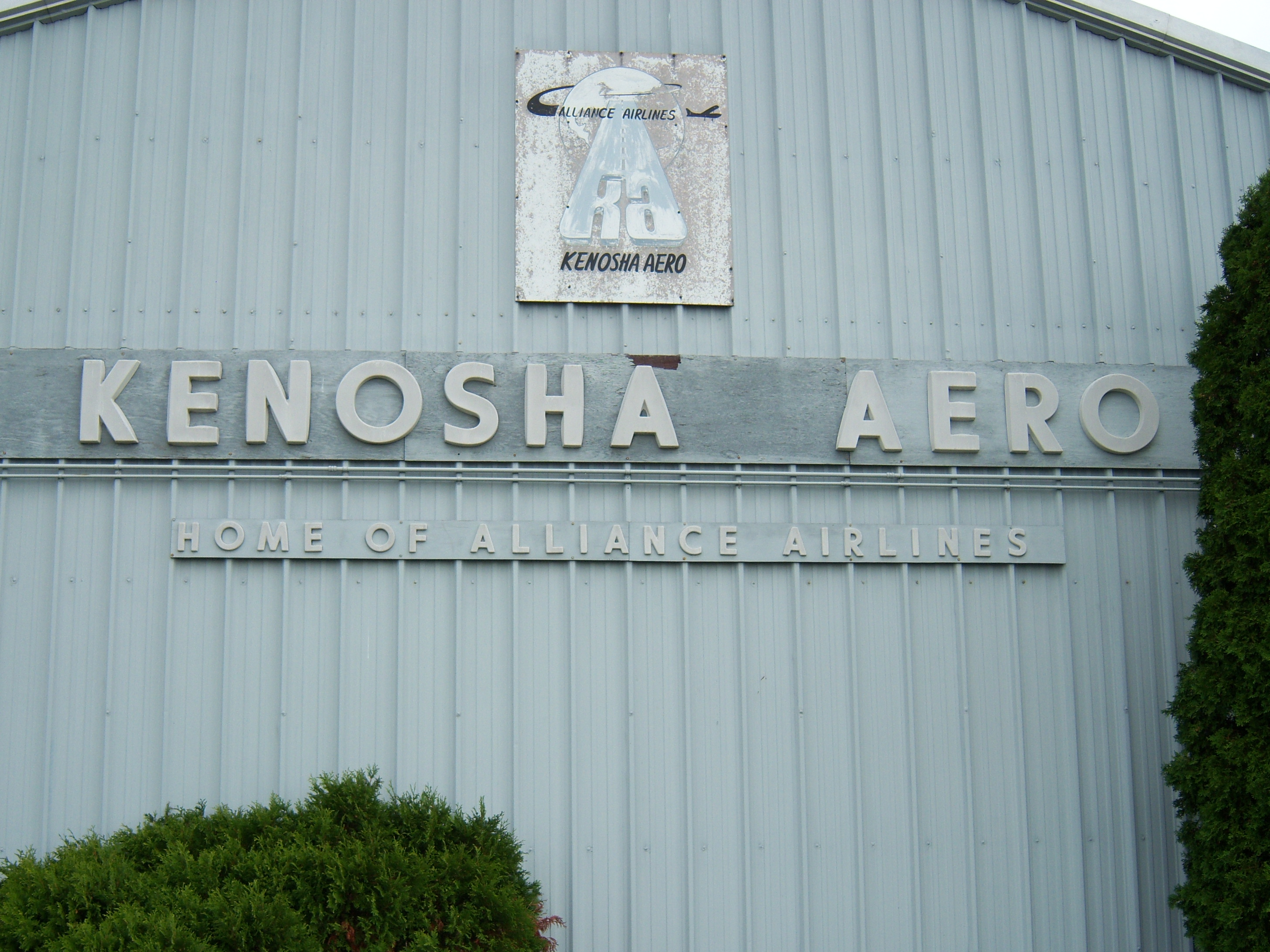
- IATA: ENW; ICAO: KENW; FAA LID: ENW

Summary
- Airport type: Public
- Owner: City of Kenosha
- Serves: Kenosha, Wisconsin
- Opened: May 1959
- Time zone: CST (UTC−06:00)
  - Summer (DST): CDT (UTC−05:00)
- Elevation AMSL: 743 ft (226 m)
- Coordinates: 42°35′46″N 087°55′39″W
- Website: www.kenosha.org/...

Maps
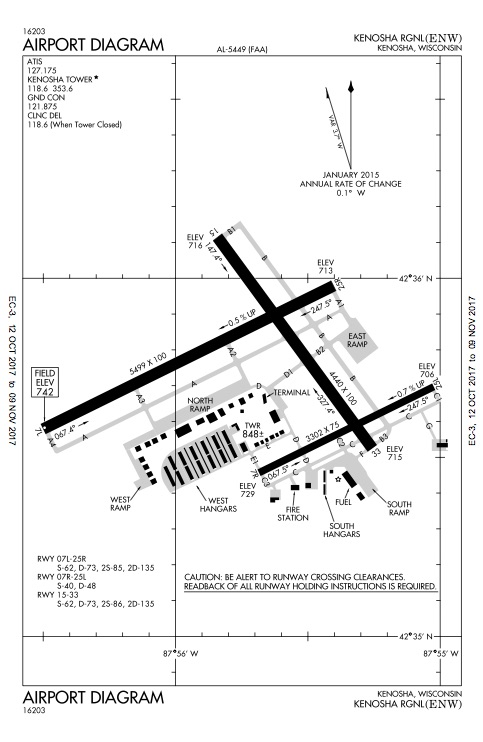
- FAA airport diagram

- Location of airport in Wisconsin ENW (the United States)

Runways
Direction	Length		Surface
Direction	ft	m	Surface
7L/25R	6,600	2,012	Concrete
15/33	4,440	1,353	Concrete
7R/25L	3,302	1,006	Asphalt/concrete

Statistics
- Aircraft operations (2021): 59,998
- Based aircraft (2024): 223
- Source: Federal Aviation Administration

Kenosha Regional Airport (IATA: ENW, ICAO: KENW, FAA LID: ENW) is a city-owned public-use airport located four nautical miles (7 km) west of the central business district of Kenosha, a city in Kenosha County, Wisconsin, United States.

The airport is an air-traffic-controlled general aviation facility with no scheduled passenger service.

It is included in the Federal Aviation Administration (FAA) National Plan of Integrated Airport Systems for 2025–2029, in which it is categorized as a national reliever airport facility.

== Facilities and aircraft ==
Kenosha Regional Airport covers an area of 974 acres (394 ha) at an elevation of 743 feet (226 m) above mean sea level. It has three runways: the primary runway 7L/25R is 6,600 by 100 feet (2,012 x 30 m) with a concrete surface; the crosswind runway 15/33 is 4,440 by 100 feet (1,353 x 30 m) with a concrete surface; 7R/25L is 3,302 by 75 feet (1,006 x 23 m) with an asphalt/concrete surface.

In 2021, the airport had 59,998 aircraft operations, an average of 164 per day: 93% general aviation, 7% air taxi and less than 1% military.

In August 2024, there were 223 aircraft based at this airport: 173 single-engine, 20 multi-engine, 17 jet, 12 helicopter and 1 glider.

== See also ==
- List of airports in Wisconsin
