= Franks Diner =

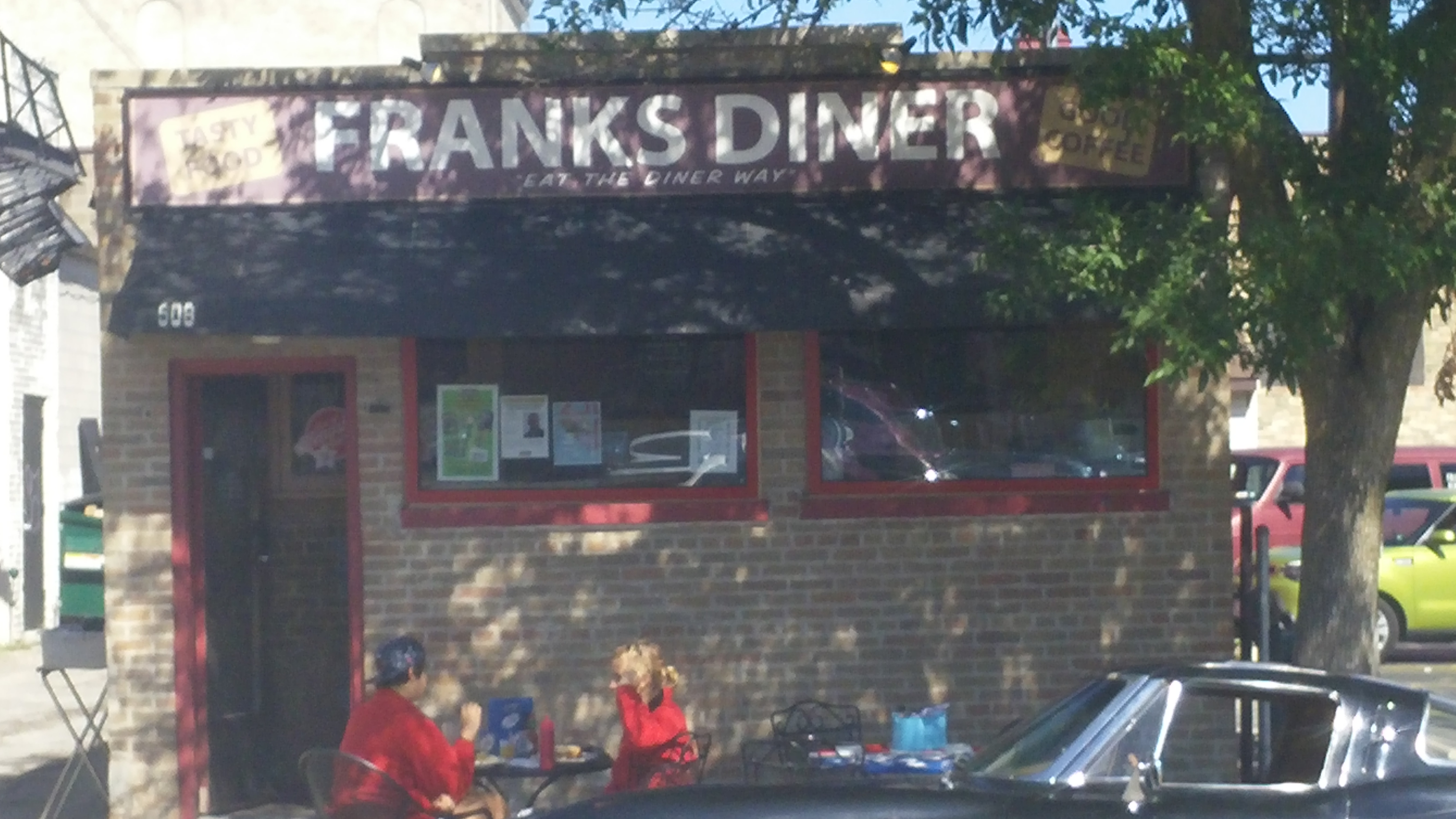
- Franks Diner in 2015
- Interactive map of Franks Diner

Restaurant information
- Food type: American
- Location: Kenosha, Wisconsin, United States
- Coordinates: 42°35′01″N 087°49′03″W

Franks Diner is a Jerry O'Mahony Diner Company lunch car diner in Kenosha, Wisconsin.

== Notable features ==
The diner seats 55 patrons and is known for the numerous slogans posted on the walls, such as "Order what you want, eat what you get." The diner's signature dish is the Garbage Plate, which consists of a large omelette cooked together with hash browns and meat.

== History ==
The dining car was built in Bayonne, New Jersey, in 1926 and transported on a railroad flatcar to Kenosha. It was then pulled by six horses to its current downtown location near the shoreline of Lake Michigan. Anthony Franks, who first learned of the restaurant opportunity through a magazine article, paid US$7,500 (equivalent to $133,210 in 2024) plus $325 in shipping charges to establish Franks' Diner.

Over the years, there have been few changes to the structural appearance of the diner. The original lunch car has an open grill and counter with 17 stools. In 1935, a small dining room was added, which now houses seven booths. Additionally, a larger kitchen was added in the mid-1940s.

The Franks family operated Franks Diner continuously until 2001 when they sold it to Lynn Groleau, Chris Schwartz, and Kris Derwae. In 2006, Derwae sold her share to Groleau and Schwartz.

In December 2010, Kevin Ervin and Julie Rittmiller purchased the restaurant and stated that they had no plans to make changes in Franks Diner's operations.

Many renovations have been completed on Franks Diner since 2001. The original kitchen, then pantry, was renovated into an additional dining area. The arched wooden ceiling and much of the woodwork was restored. Removing layers of paint uncovered the original "Franks DINER" hand-lettered sign painted on what was the outer side of the original dining car, now facing the inside of the main dining area.

== Celebrity patrons ==
In past years, vaudeville and other entertainment acts at local theaters were popular. Many performers, including The Three Stooges, Bela Lugosi, Duke Ellington, Liberace and members of the Lawrence Welk orchestra, dined at Franks. Recent celebrity sightings include Chicago news anchor Ron Magers; New York weather presenter and actor Lonnie Quinn; and Peter Tork of The Monkees; and Food Network host Guy Fieri, who featured the diner on Diners, Drive-Ins and Dives. Franks Diner has been featured in numerous other television shows, travel magazines, newspapers and radio programs.
