= List of Georgia State University people =

Coordinates: 33.75278°N 84.38611°W

This is a list of Georgia State University people. Georgia State University is an urban research university in downtown Atlanta, Georgia, United States. Founded in 1913, it serves a diverse population of approximately 50,000 students, and is one of the University System of Georgia's four research universities. The current university president is M. Brian Blake.

== Notable alumni ==
- ABRA, musician, actress
- Angela Doyinsola Aina, public health practitioner
- Yolo Akili, activist, writer, and emotional health advocate
- Amalia Amaki, artist and art historian
- Sandra Lynn Barnes, educator, sociologist and author
- Foley Beach, archbishop of the Anglican Church in North America
- Christo Bilukidi, NFL player
- Lakeyta Bonnette-Bailey, academic
- Keisha Lance Bottoms, former mayor of Atlanta
- Coy Bowles, musician, Zac Brown Band
- Henrique Braun, COO of Coca-Cola
- David Brown, former host of public radio show Marketplace
- John Burke, Grammy-nominated pianist and composer
- Max Burns, former congressman, Georgia's 12th District
- Ann-Marie Campbell, president, Southern Division, The Home Depot
- Joey Cape, musician, Lagwagon
- Benita Carr, photographer
- Dru Castro, musician, Grammy winner
- Joyce Chandler, former educator and member of the Georgia House of Representatives
- Brad Cohen, teacher and author of Front of the Class: How Tourette Syndrome Made Me the Teacher I Never Had
- Kat Cole, COO of Cinnabon
- Lanard Copeland, former NBA player, later played in the National Basketball League (Australia)
- Paul Coverdell, late US senator from Georgia (attended)
- Daffney, professional wrestler
- Robert Davis, NFL player
- Shamari DeVoe, lead singer of Blaque
- Andre Dickens, Atlanta mayor, 2022–
- William DuVall, lead singer of Alice in Chains
- Douglas Edwards, America's first network news anchor
- William M. Fields, primatologist
- Louie Giglio, pastor, author
- Travis Glover, NFL player
- Predrag Gosta, conductor and artistic director
- Tamyra Gray, actress, musician
- Matthew Hilger, professional poker player and author
- Kim Hoeckele, artist
- Mary Hood, author
- Hank Huckaby, Georgia representative and chancellor of the University System of Georgia
- Jerry Huckaby, former U.S. representative from Louisiana's 5th congressional district, received a Master of Business Administration degree
- RJ Hunter, professional basketball player
- Nabilah Islam, Georgia state senator for the 7th district
- Shamsud-Din Bahar Jabbar, suspect in 2025 New Orleans truck attack
- Henry Jenkins, director, MIT, Comparative Media Studies
- Ulrick John, NFL player
- Jan Jones, speaker pro tempore in the Georgia State Legislature
- Simran Judge, American-Indian model and actor
- Maya Kalle-Bentzur (born 1958), Israeli Olympic runner and long jumper
- John C. Knapp, president of Washington & Jefferson College
- Farooq Kperogi, journalist, media scholar at Kennesaw State University
- Lance Krall, actor
- Ousman Krubally (born 1988), American-Gambian basketball player in the Israeli Basketball Premier League
- Ken Lewis, CEO of Bank of America
- Anya Liftig, performance artist
- Lita, professional wrestler better (attended)
- Ludacris, musician, actor
- Wil Lutz, NFL player
- Sam Massell, former mayor of Atlanta
- Sheryl McCollum, professor, crime analyst, non-profit founder/director
- Corrina Sephora Mensoff, artist
- Jere Morehead, 22nd and current president of the University of Georgia
- Amber Nash, comedian and actress, provides the voice of Pam Poovey on Archer
- Nimay Ndolo, media personality and software developer
- Sharlotte Neely, anthropologist, author, and expert on the Cherokees
- Rodger Nishioka, professor of Christian education
- Rusty Paul, second mayor of Sandy Springs, Georgia
- Teena Piccione, North Carolina secretary of Information Technology
- Jody Powell, White House press secretary, 1977–1980
- Lockett Pundt, guitarist for Deerhunter
- Brad Raffensperger, Georgia secretary of state during the 2020 United States presidential election
- Malika Redmond, activist and non-profit director
- Marco Restrepo, musician
- Glenn Richardson, former speaker, Georgia House of Representatives
- Julia Roberts, actress (attended)
- Bryant Rogowski, former professional wrestler who used the stage name Bryant Anderson
- Rubi Rose, rapper
- Sue Savage-Rumbaugh, primatologist at GSU's Language Research Center
- Adam Schultz, chief official White House photographer
- Charles Shapiro, former ambassador to Venezuela, deputy assistant secretary at the US State Department
- Edward Skeletrix, conceptual artist
- Caleb Spivak, actor, model, and entrepreneur
- Andy Stanley, church planter, pastor, and author
- Todd Starnes, author
- Linton Stephens, associate justice of the Supreme Court of Georgia
- Ray Stevens, musician
- Sarah Tiana, comedian, actress
- Will Turpin, bassist for Collective Soul
- Beth Van Fleet, AVP beach volleyball professional player
- Gerald R. Weeks, psychologist
- Lynn Westmoreland, United States representative
- Walter Lee Williams, historian, author, and former FBI Ten Most Wanted Fugitive arrested for sexual acts with underage boys and possession of erotic paraphernalia related to child pornography
- Albert Wilson, NFL player

== Notable faculty ==
- Roger Bakeman, developmental psychologist
- Raffi Besalyan, pianist
- David Bottoms, Georgia's Poet Laureate
- Virginia Spencer Carr, biographer
- James C. Cox, Noah Langdale Jr. Chair in Economics and Georgia Research Alliance Eminent Scholar at GSU
- Deborah Duchon, anthropologist and Food Network personality
- Eric Gaucher, biologist
- Nancy Grace, former prosecutor and current host on CourtTV and CNN (former instructor, no current appointment at GSU)
- Beth Gylys, poet
- Xiaochun He, high-energy nuclear physicist
- Carole Hill, anthropologist and former professor
- Asa Hilliard
- Colleen McEdwards, anchor on CNN International
- Arun Rai, editor-in-chief of Management Information Systems Quarterly
- Donald Ratajczak, economist
- Robert Scott Thompson, composer
- Akinyele Umoja
- Vijay Vaishnavi, computer information systems researcher and scholar
