= Gaucher =

Gaucher is a French surname. Notable people with the surname include:

- Charles-Étienne Gaucher (1740–1804), French engraver
- Elias Gaucher, French publisher
- Eric Gaucher (born 1972), American biologist
- Guillaume Gamelin Gaucher (1810–1885), Canadian businessman and politician
- Guy Gaucher (1930–2014), French Catholic Discalced Carmelite bishop and theologian
- Jacob Gaucher (born 2001), Canadian ice hockey player
- Jules Gaucher (1905–1954), French Army officer
- Kim Gaucher (born 1984), Canadian women's basketball player
- Nathan Gaucher (born 2003), Canadian ice hockey player
- Philippe Gaucher (1854–1918), French dermatologist
- Robert Gaucher (born 1969), American admiral
- Roland Gaucher (1919–2007), French journalist and politician
- Ryan Gaucher (born 1978), Canadian ice hockey player
- Yves Gaucher (1934–2000), Canadian painter and printmaker

== See also ==
- Gaucher's disease
