= Abuy Nfubea =

Equatoguinean journalist and writer

Dr. Abuy Nfubea
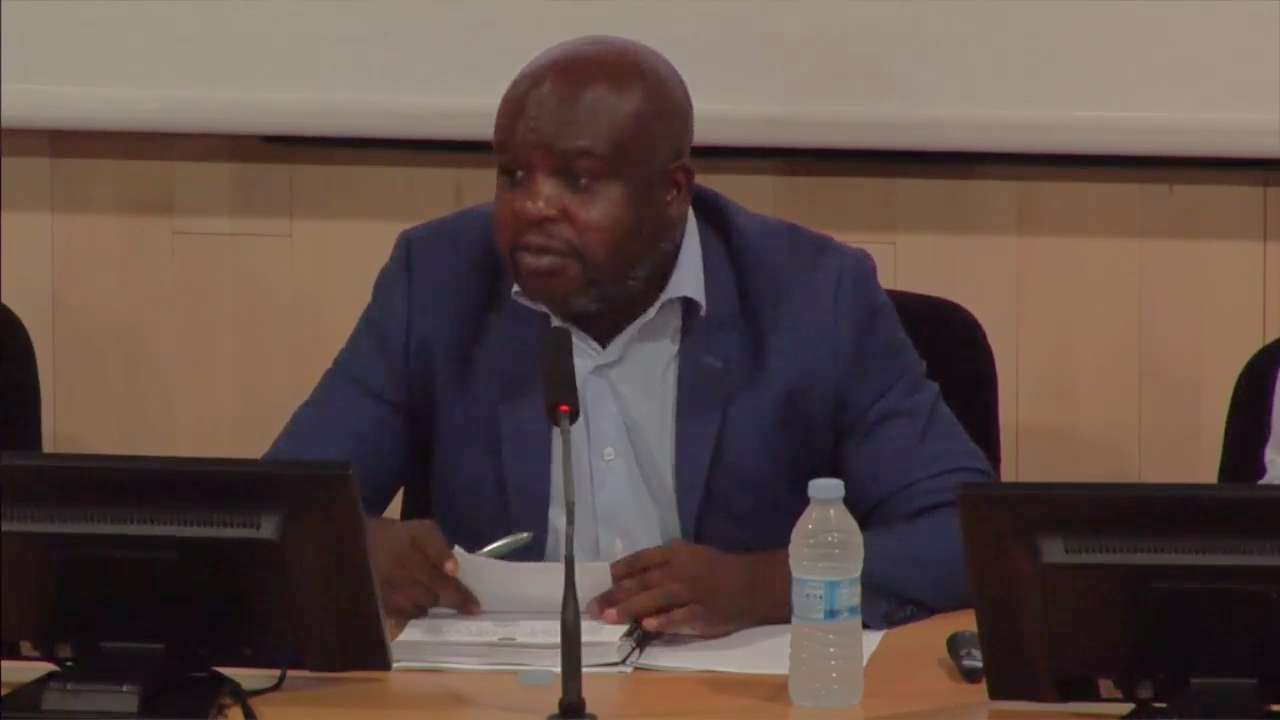
- Abuy Nfubea in 2010
- Born: Sergio Larrie Abuy Nfubea; Equatorial Guinea
- Occupation(s): Journalist, political analyst, writer, editor, lecturer and pan-africanist activist,
- Organization: Pan-African Federation of Black Communities of Spain

Sergio Larrie Abuy Nfubea is an Equatorial Guinean journalist, political analyst, writer, editor, lecturer and Pan-Africanist activist. He is president of the Pan-African Federation of Black Communities of Spain and co-founder of organizations such as the Spanish section of the New Black Panther Party, FOJA and the IV Garveyist Cimarron International. In 2008 he was awarded an Honoris Causa Doctorate by the Tawantinsuyu Indigenous University in La Paz, Bolivia, for his great fight against racism.

He is a regular contributor to radio and television media, in addition to writing articles. Is the director of Uhuru Africa TV and has been editor-in-chief and director of multiple media outlets since 1989 when he created Afrotown magazine, the first media aimed at young black people in Spain.

== Activism ==
Abuy began his political activism while still a student in the late 1980s in Spain, influenced by the teachings and political activism of prominent black figures such as Dr. Alfonso Arcelín, Malcolm X, Dr. Akinyele Umoja, Mumia Abu Jamal, Winnie Mandela and the Hip-Hop movement.

He was co-founder of FOJA Black Panther Movement Spain in 1990 and in 1994, as a student leader. In 1995 he led the Spanish delegation at the 'A Million Men March' in Washington convened by the honorable Luis Farrakhan. That same year he was a member of the organizing committee of the 2nd Congress of the Black Panther Party of the Spanish State, 'La llamada final' in Alcalá de Henares.

He is a historical defender of African reparations. He was the promoter of the "monument for Dr. Alfonso Arcelin" campaign and 'PNL2010', a non-law proposal approved on February 17, 2010, which urges the Spanish State to carry out affirmative action policies with blacks for centuries of slavery, colonialism, apartheid and immigration February 17, 2010. A year later, said date was registered in the Ministry of Culture as the national day of the Afro-Spanish people or black community.

== Journalism ==
Abuy Nfubea has been editor-in-chief and director of multiple media outlets including: Afrotown (1989), African Cultures (2004–2008), Africa News (2007–2010), Omowale (2000), African Business Guide (2003). He is editor of Wanafrica, the only African newspaper in Spain. Since 2003 he has been a correspondent for the Pan-African Press Agency and a member of the International Press Club.

He is a regular contributor to radio and television media, in addition to writing articles in media such as Tele K, Radio Nacional de Venezuela, Tele Sur, Interviu, Onda Madrid, Cadena Ser Hora 25, RNE, RTVE, Jean Afrique, Africa Lusofona, BBC, Radio Voice of Africa, Black News, Afrique Novell, Soweto among others.
