= Xiaochun =

Xiaochun may refer to:

== First name ==
- Xiaochun He, a high-energy nuclear physicist

== Surname ==
- Empress Dowager Xiaochun (1588-1615), Ming dynasty concubine
- Liu Xiaochun (born 1974), Chinese rower
- Ma Xiaochun (born 1964), Chinese professional Go player
- Miao Xiaochun (born 1964), artist and photographer
