= Doyinsola =

Doyinsola is a name. It can be a given name, a middle name, or a surname. Notable people with this name include:

- Doyinsola Abiola Aboaba, a Nigerian journalist
- Angela Doyinsola Aina, an American public health practitioner and activist
- Adesanya Doyinsola, also known as "D'Tunes", a Nigerian musician
