= Sharon Cemetery Historic District =

Historic district in Iowa, United States

- U.S. National Register of Historic Places
- U.S. Historic district
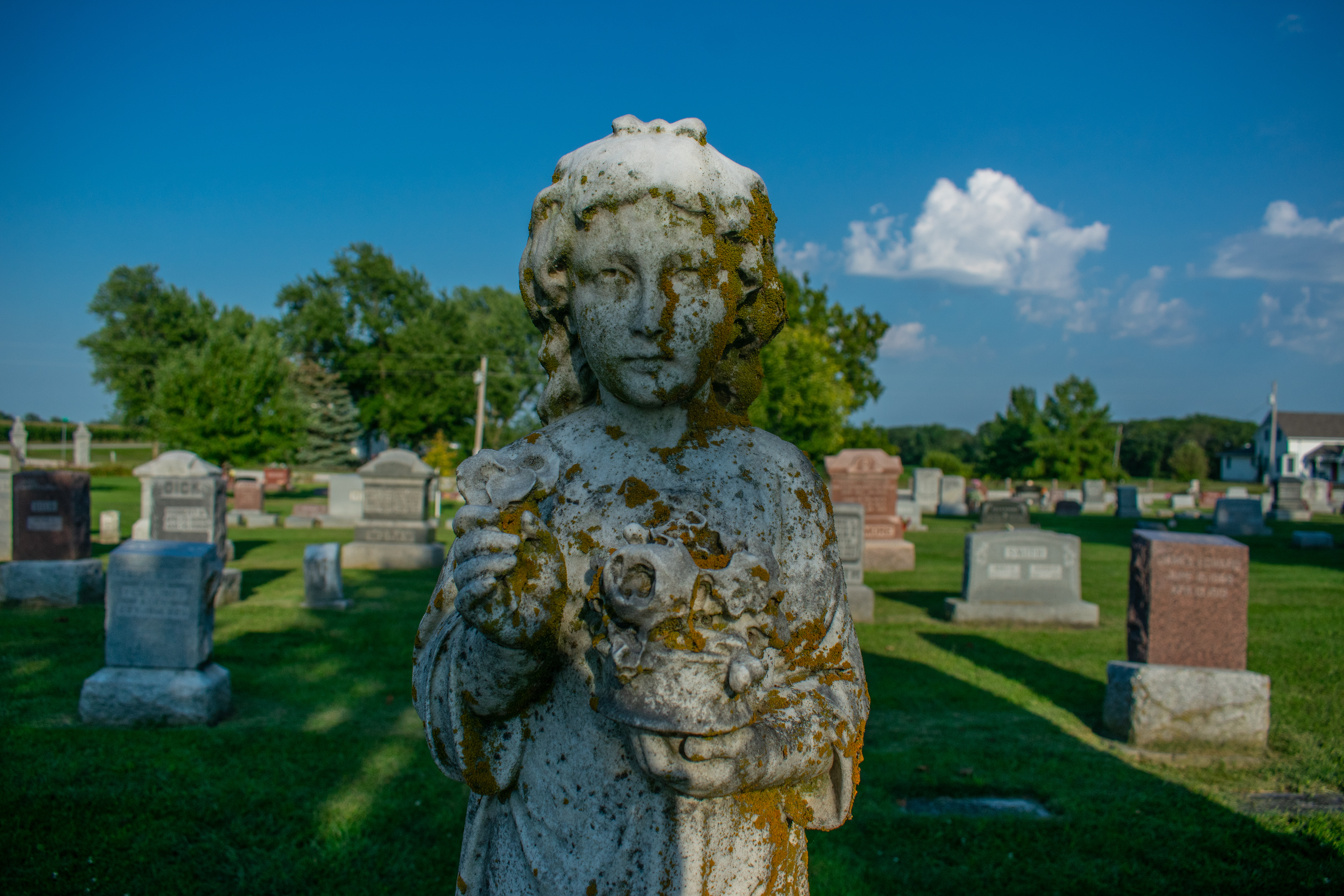

- Location within Iowa Location within the United States
- Location: County Road J40 about 3 miles (4.8 km) east of the Van Buren county line
- Nearest city: Farmington, Iowa
- Coordinates: 40°43′31″N 91°39′41″W
- Area: 9.5 acres (3.8 ha)
- Architect: O.C. Simonds
- NRHP reference No.: 90002133
- Added to NRHP: January 11, 1991

Sharon Cemetery Historic District is located in rural Harrison Township, Lee County, Iowa, United States near the town of Farmington. It was listed on the National Register of Historic Places in 1991. At the time of its nomination the historic district included four contributing buildings, one contributing site, eight contributing structures, and one contributing object.

The buildings in the district belong to Sharon Presbyterian Church and the cemetery in the churchyard. They include the church itself (1885), the manse (1918), the sexton's house (1899), and the toilet rooms and lavatory (c. 1902). The buildings are all of frame construction. The cemetery itself is the contributing site. It was divided into two sections. The oldest section is 4 acres (1.6 ha) and was established in the 1860s. The newer section, also four acres, surrounds the older section and was added in 1899. O.C. Simonds was a landscape architect who laid out the rural cemetery and created a plan for plantings on the property, but it is unclear how closely the plan was followed. An American Revolutionary War soldier who died in Lee County was reburied in the cemetery and a grave marker for him was erected in 1907 by an act of the Iowa General Assembly. The contributing object is a water fountain with a galvanized iron basin that is located at the junction of the entry-drive and the loop driveway. Other contributing structures include the driveways, entry gate, walkways, drainage system, stone curbs, hitching posts, and the coping, fence, and pedestrian gates.

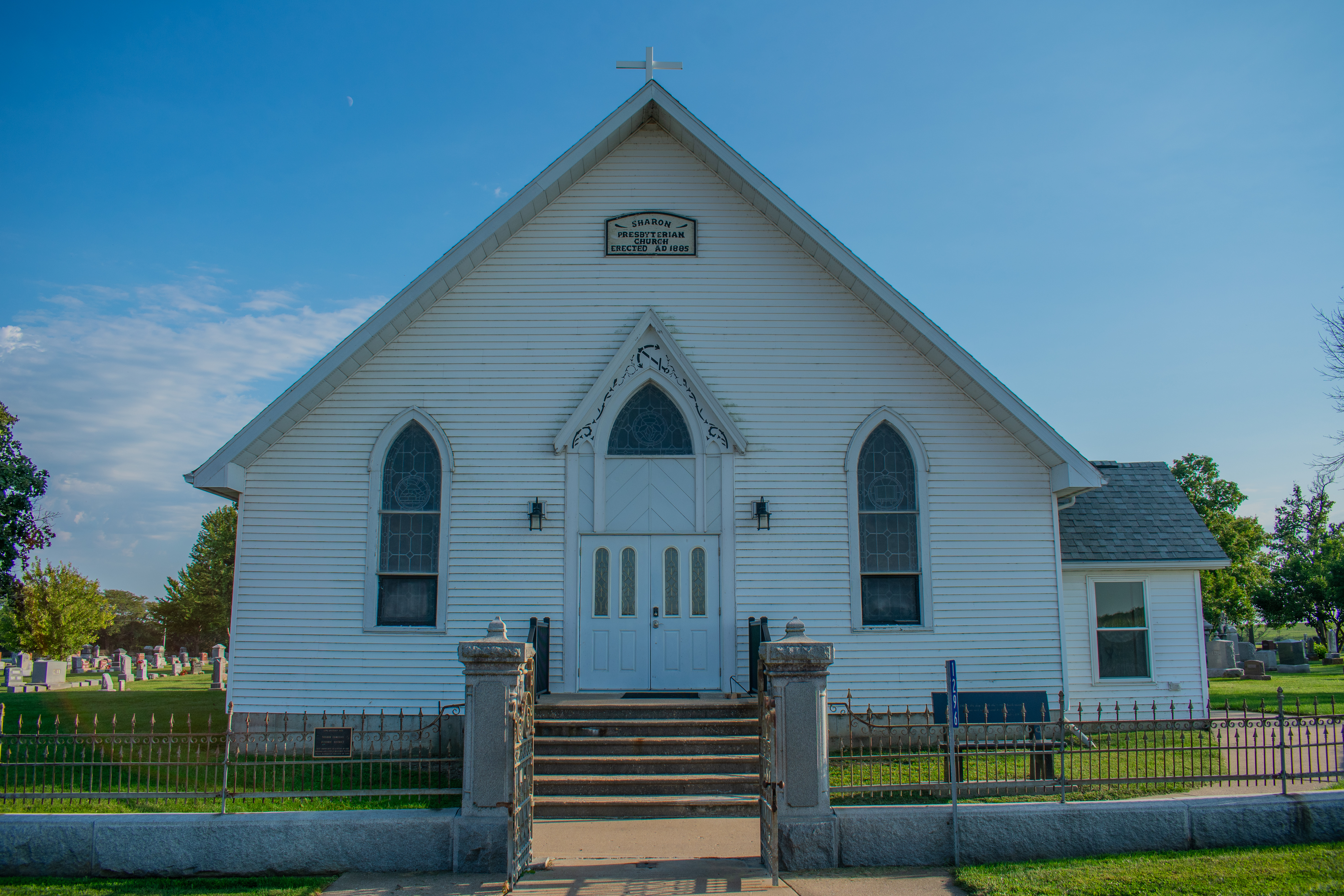
Sharon Presbyterian Church

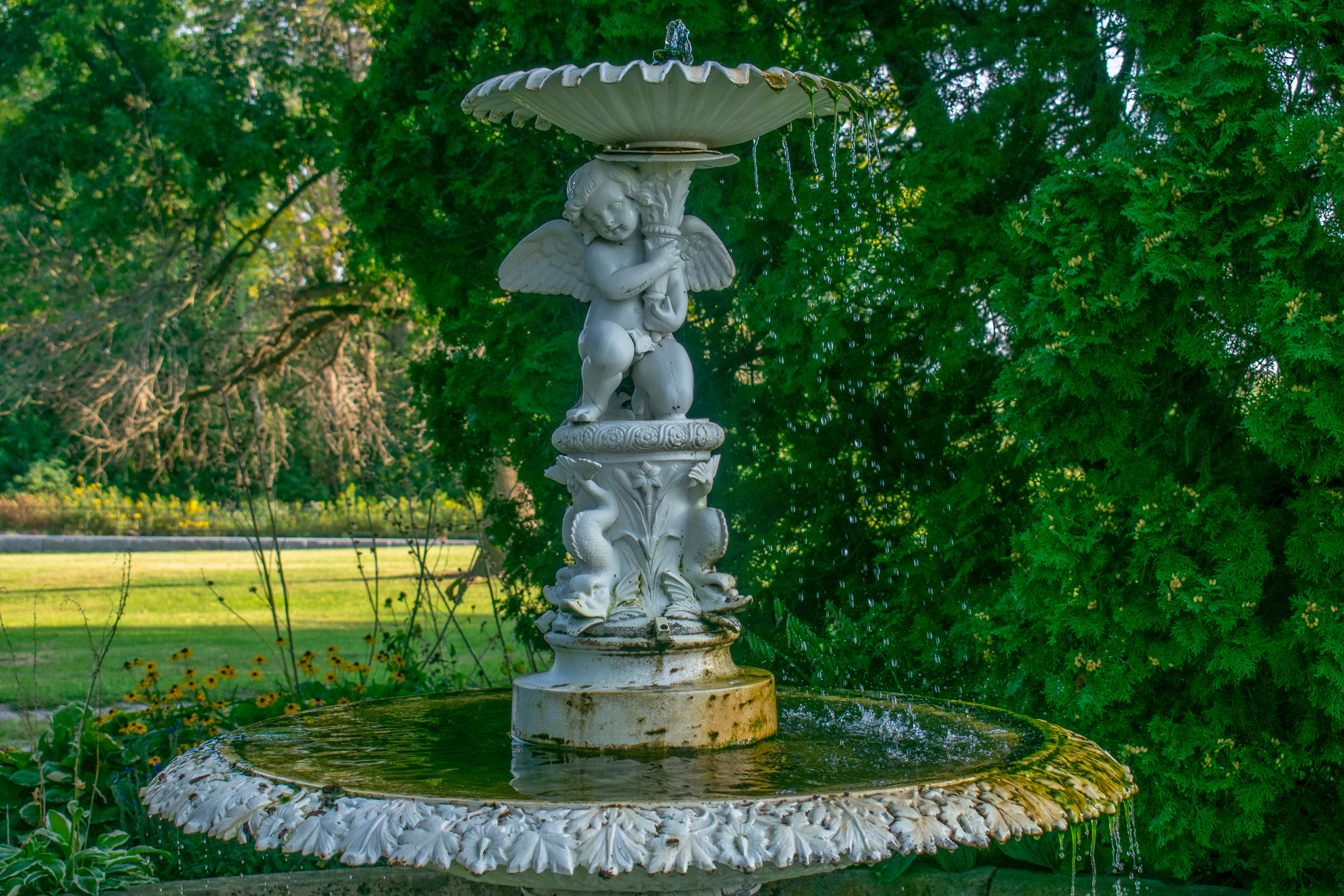
Fountain

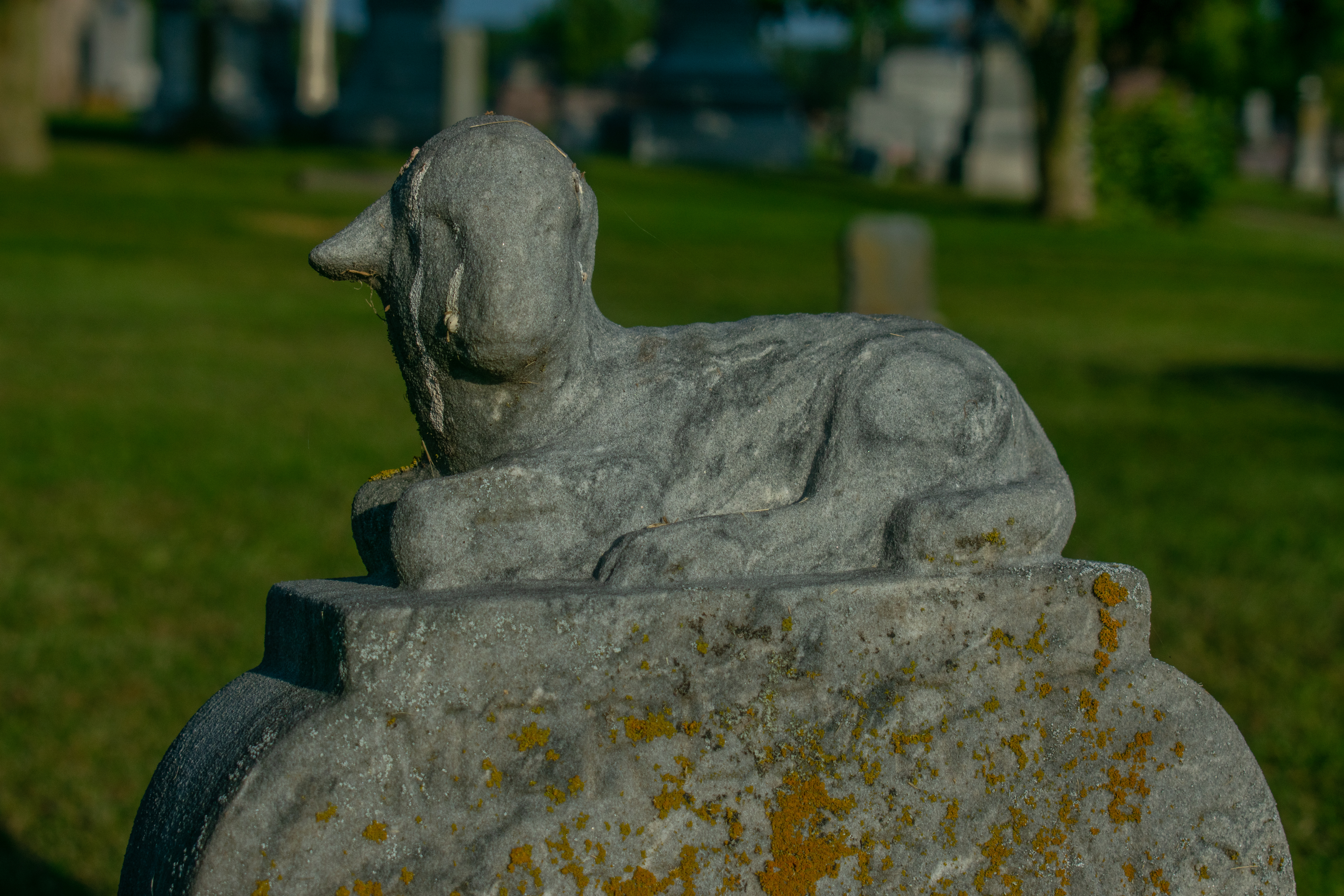
Lamb sculpture on a grave marker

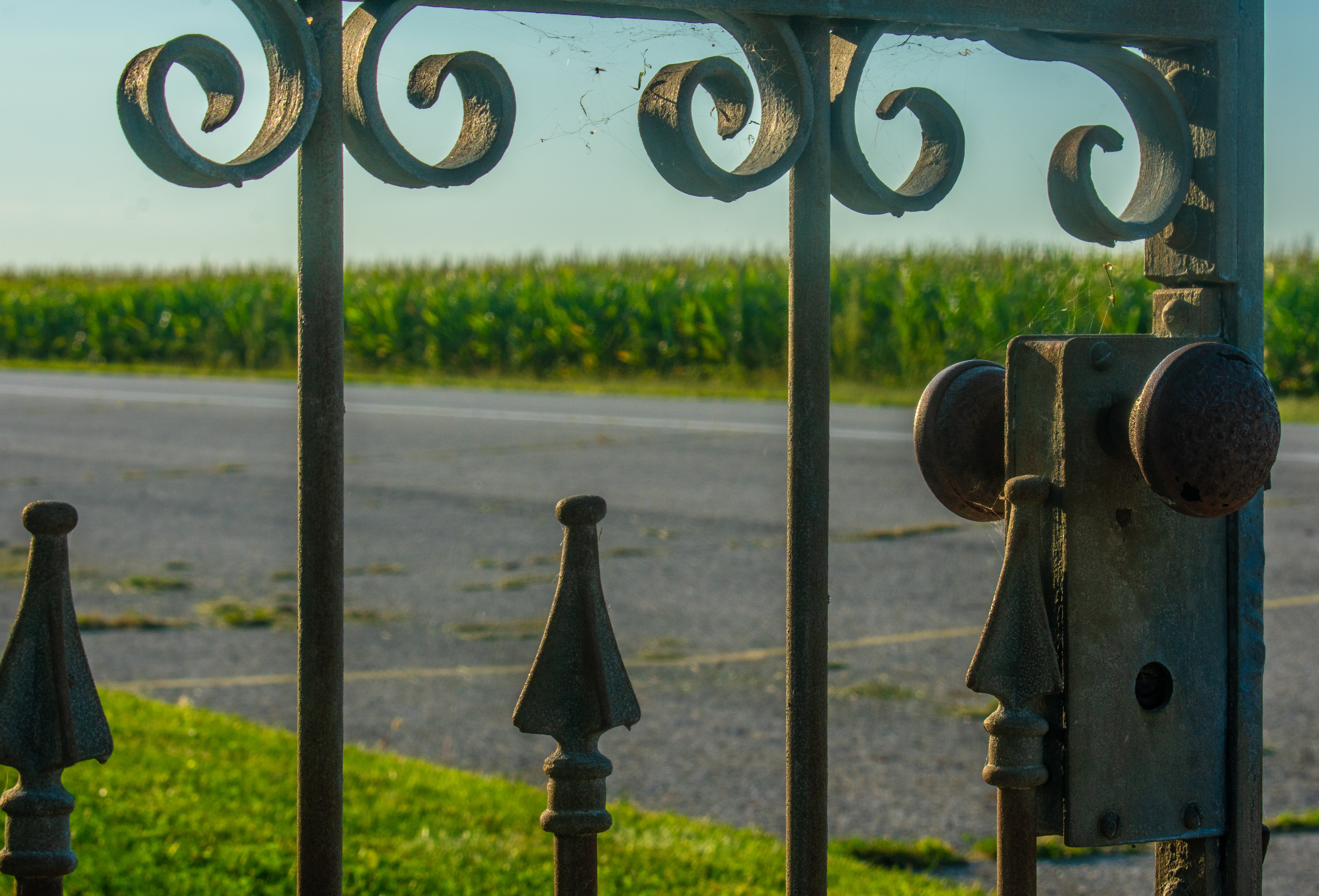
Part of the fence
