= John Albert Brown =

American oilman (1885–1944)

- Born: July 28, 1885; Hampton, Pennsylvania
- Died: September 9, 1944 (aged 59); Montreal, Quebec
- Education: Girard College ('01)
- Spouse: Ella Marie Mathiesen (m. 1916)

John Albert Brown (July 28, 1885 – September 9, 1944) was an American oilman who served from 1933 to 1944 as chief executive, and from 1935 to 1944 as president of the Socony-Vacuum Oil Company (the former name of the Mobil Oil Corporation). Brown began his career in 1901 in Pennsylvania, and in 1911 moved to California where he entered the petroleum industry. Later that decade he worked for the Cecil Rhodes group of companies, and in 1917 negotiated the sale of its Mexican oil operations to the Standard Oil Company (New Jersey).

From 1917 to 1926, Brown worked for Jersey Standard in Mexico, and from 1926 to 1928 was posted in the Dutch East Indies. He returned to California in 1928 and became president of the General Petroleum Corporation, a subsidiary of the Standard Oil Company of New York (Socony). Following Socony's merger with the Vacuum Oil Company in 1931 to form Socony-Vacuum, in 1933 Brown was transferred to New York City to become chairman of the executive committee of the new company, and in 1935 he assumed the additional office of president. During World War II, Brown was a prominent industry leader in the country's petroleum strategy. Brown died in September 1944 at age 59 while on holiday in Quebec. After his death, he was succeeded as president of Socony by Brewster Jennings.

== Biography ==
=== Family and early life ===
John Albert Brown was born in Hampton, Pennsylvania on July 28, 1885, to Dr. John Jacobs Brown (1851–1889) and Viola Adelaide Albert (1861–1922). The Browns were descendants of Rudolph Braun, who had come to America from The Netherlands in the 17th century and settled in North Carolina. John Albert had two older siblings, Ryno (1880–1885) and Bertha Irene (1882–1966), and a younger sister, Mary Edith (1887–1977). His younger sister married Edwin Elmore Jacobs, the president of Ashland College. John Albert's paternal grandfather was a bishop in the Brethren Church, and his maternal grandfather was a minister in the Reformed Church in the United States. His father, John Jacobs, was a country doctor who traveled by horse and buggy to visit patients. In 1888, John Jacobs was elected to the Pennsylvania House of Representatives as a Democrat.

On June 27, 1889, John Jacobs Brown died from the effects of an attempted suicide by morphine two days earlier. Following her husband's death, Viola placed John Albert in Girard College. John boarded at the school and returned home in the summers to live with his mother and aunt. He finished school in the spring of 1901, a month before turning 16. In 1943, Brown was awarded the Stephen Girard Award as the school's outstanding alumnus, and gave the address at that year's convocation.

=== Career ===
Upon graduation, Brown took a job in the auditor's department of the Pennsylvania Coal and Coke Company. Later, he became private secretary to one of the heads of the company, and then became credit manager for the company. In 1911, Brown moved to Taft, California to become secretary-treasurer of a small oil company. After the company was sold, Brown joined the Cecil Rhodes group, which had mining interests in North and South America, and oil in Mexico. In 1917, Brown led the sale of the Rhodes oil operations, the Mexican Petroleum and Liquid Fuel Company, to the Standard Oil Company of New Jersey. Following the sale, Brown was hired by Jersey Standard to become assistant manager of its Mexican operations. At this time, Brown moved to Tampico. Brown remained in Mexico until 1926, when he was posted to the Dutch East Indies. In 1928, Brown returned stateside and settled in Los Angeles, where he became vice-president of the General Petroleum Corporation, which was a subsidiary of the Standard Oil Company of New York (Socony).

In July 1931, Socony merged with the Vacuum Oil Company to form the Socony-Vacuum Oil Company. In November 1933, the company's board of directors met to review its executives. Following the review, Brown was brought to New York City to succeed Charles Francis Meyer as chairman of the executive committee, making him the de facto chief executive of Socony-Vacuum.

At Socony's annual meeting on May 31, 1944, Herbert L. Pratt retired as chairman of the company, and president Charles Edward Arnott demoted himself to a vice-presidency to enable himself more time for his work on stabilization in the industry. At this time, Brown assumed the presidency of the company.

In addition to his work with Socony-Vacuum, in 1934 he was elected a director of the Chase National Bank, and in 1942 became a member of the Bank's executive committee. Brown served as president of the Chamber of Commerce of the State of New York and in 1940 served as chairman of the Greater New York Fund. He was a director and member of the executive committee of the American Petroleum Institute. He was a director of the 1939 New York World's Fair, the Association of Commerce and Industry, and the Economic Club of New York.

During World War II, Brown played a major role in American petroleum oversight. At the outbreak of war, he was appointed chairman of the general committee of District 1, comprising the 17 eastern states and the District of Columbia, of the Petroleum Industry War Council. Later he became chairman of the National Oil Policy Committee. In April 1944, he was designated an industrial advisor to the Anglo-American conference on oil policies.

In early August 1944, at the behest of colleagues and friends, Brown traveled to Quebec for a vacation at the Seigniory Club. On August 13, he went to Montreal to receive an emergency gall bladder operation at the Royal Victoria Hospital. Initially Brown recovered from the operation, however, on September 8, Socony reported that he had become critically ill. The following day, Brown died at the hospital, aged 59. On September 14, 1944, the Socony board met and elected Brewster Jennings to succeed Brown as president and chairman of the executive committee, while Harold Frank Sheets was elected chairman of the board, an office that had been vacant since 1935.

The funeral was held on September 12 at St. Bartholomew's Episcopal Church in Manhattan, and the service was conducted by the Rev. George Paull Torrence Sargent. Honorary pallbearers were Winthrop W. Aldrich, chairman, and Joseph E. Pogue, vice-president of the Chase National Bank; John D. Rockefeller Jr.; F. S. Fales, retired director of Socony-Vacuum; Alfred Jacobsen, president of the American Petroleum Corporation; Arthur B. Lawrence, partner in F. S. Smithers & Co.; D. Alva Little, president of Magnolia Petroleum; R. L. Minckler, assistant to the president of the General Petroleum Corporation; Earl Tappan Stannard, president of Kennecott Copper; Walter C. Teagle, retired president of Jersey Standard; and G. S. Walden, former chairman of Standard Vacuum.

=== Personal life ===
On the evening of Thursday, September 21, 1916, at the Old Bergen Church in Jersey City, Brown married Ella Marie Mathiesen (1889–1978). During his tenure in New York City, the Browns lived in the Waldorf Astoria. John and Ella did not have children.

He was a member of the Metropolitan Club, Saint Andrew's Golf Club, Blind Brook Club, Los Angeles Country Club, and Monterey Peninsula Country Club.

Brown was interred in Sleepy Hollow Cemetery.
