= We Will Shoot Back =

We Will Shoot Back: Armed Resistance in the Mississippi Freedom Movement
- Author: Akinyele Umoja
- Language: English
- Subject: African-American history
- Published: April 2013
- Publisher: New York University Press
- Publication place: United States
- ISBN: 9780814725245

We Will Shoot Back: Armed Resistance in the Mississippi Freedom Movement is a non-fiction book written by Akinyele Umoja, an American author and educator. It was published in April 2013 by New York University Press.

A review in The Clarion-Ledger in 2015 described the book as following "confrontations in communities across the state through the end of the 1970s, demonstrating how black Mississippians were ultimately able to overcome intimidation by mainstream society, defeat legal segregation, and claim a measure of political control of their state." The author was honored for the book in 2014 in Oakland.

== Reviews ==
- Hughett, Amanda (January 1, 2016), "Review of We Will Shoot Back: Armed Resistance in the Mississippi Freedom Movement", Journal of African American History, 101 (1/2): 201–204
- Gritter, Elizabeth (January 1, 2016), "Review of We Will Shoot Back: Armed Resistance in the Mississippi Freedom Movement", History: Reviews of New Books, 44 (1), New York: New York University: 5
- Morgan Ward, Jason (June 1, 2014), "Freedom and Firepower (A review of the book We Will Shoot Back: Armed Resistance in the Mississippi Freedom)", Reviews in American History, 42 (2): 341–345
- Briley, Ron; McCutcheon, Camille (June 1, 2014), "Review of We Will Shoot Back: Armed Resistance in the Mississippi Freedom Movement", Journal of American Culture, 37 (2): 267–268
- Strain, Christopher (February 1, 2014), "Review of We Will Shoot Back: Armed Resistance in the Mississippi Freedom Movement", American Historical Review, 119 (1): 207–208
