= Lowell Park (Dixon, Illinois) =

- U.S. National Register of Historic Places
- U.S. Historic district
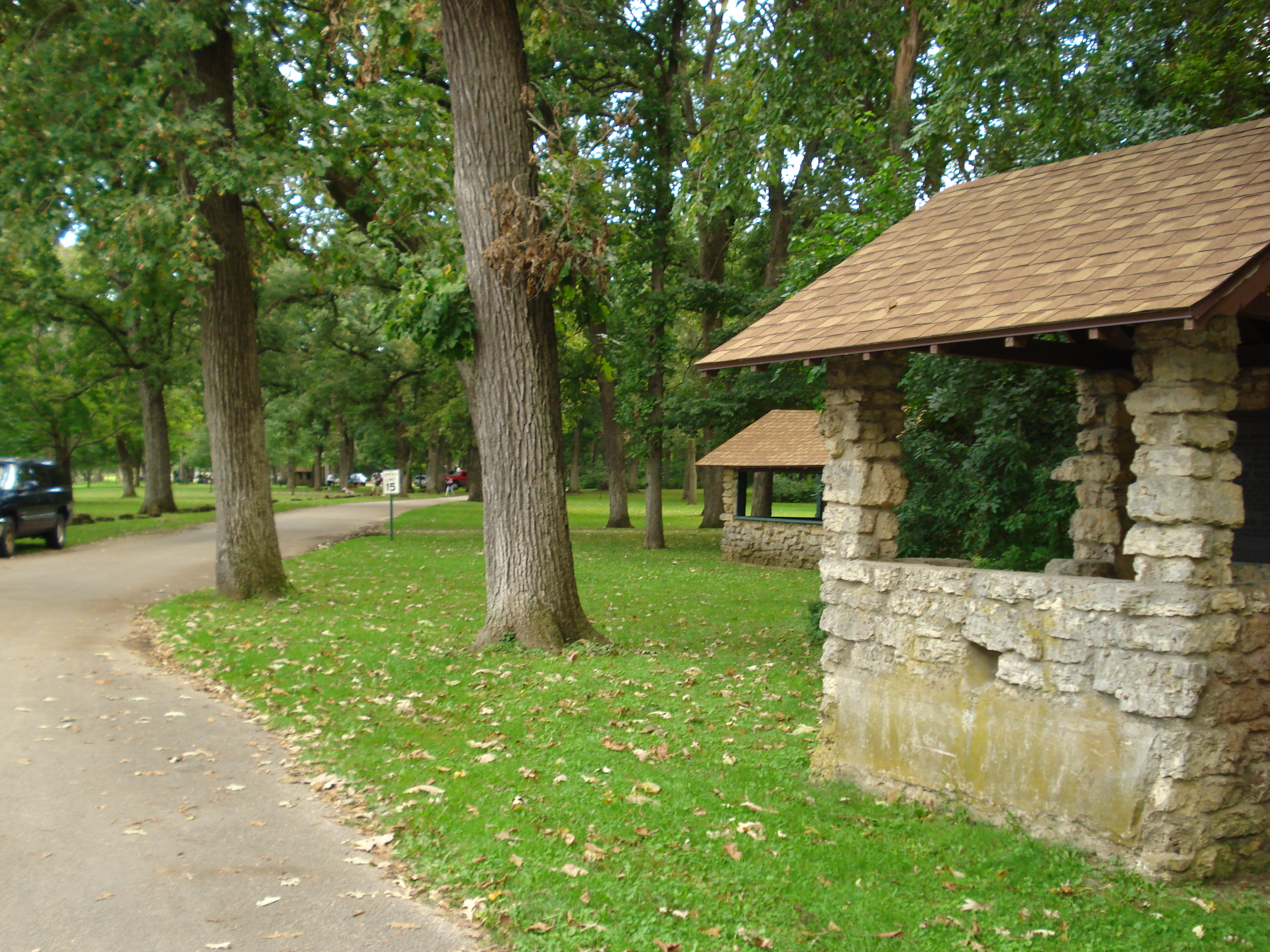
- Main entrance stone pillars at Lowell Park

- Location within Illinois Location within the United States
- Location: 2114 Lowell Park Rd., Dixon, Illinois
- Coordinates: 41°53′23″N 89°29′43″W
- Area: 200 acres (81 ha)
- Built: 1907
- Architect: Ossian Cole Simonds
- MPS: Dixon Parks MPS
- NRHP reference No.: 06000680
- Added to NRHP: August 8, 2006

Lowell Park is a 200-acre municipal park located along the Rock River in northern Dixon, Illinois. It is listed on the National Register of Historic Places (NRHP) for its significance in American landscape design, specifically as an exemplar of the Prairie Style park movement.

The park's NRHP listing is attributed to Criterion C (Design/Construction) as the work of a master landscape architect, Ossian Cole Simonds. Simonds' design emphasized the park's natural scenery by utilizing native plantings and respecting the existing hydrology and topography, establishing it as a "crown jewel" of the Dixon park system.

== History and Design ==
The park land was originally acquired in 1906 when Carlotta Lowell donated the property to the City of Dixon to commemorate the lives of her parents, Charles Russell Lowell and Josephine Shaw Lowell. The donation stipulated the land be maintained as a naturalistic park for public use. Although the land was given in 1906, the Dixon Park District itself was not officially established until 1934, following a public vote, at which point the city transferred control of the parks to the new district.

Initial planning for the site included consultation with some of the most prominent landscape designers of the time, including Arthur Coleman Comey and the Olmsted Brothers (the firm founded by the sons of Frederick Law Olmsted). However, the final, nationally significant design that guided the park's development through the mid-20th century was crafted by Ossian Cole Simonds, a founding member of the American Society of Landscape Architects and a major figure in the Prairie School movement. Simonds' comprehensive plan for the park opened to the public in 1907, though the full extent of the design's vision, including shelters and roads, was not fully completed until 1942. The park's purpose as a large-scale natural preserve served as a forerunner to the Illinois State Park system.

== Features and Significance ==
The park's 200 acres include rugged river bluffs, deep ravines, forested areas, and 50 acres dedicated to the nature preserve, offering diverse ecological environments. The park's dramatic topography, including bluffs reaching 144 feet above the valley, was carved by glacial meltwater that coursed through the Rock River channel. Key historical and natural features of the park include:

- The Pinetum: A significant stand of diverse pine trees established early in the park's history.
- The Lowell Shelter: An important early structure within the park's design.
- Riverfront and Bathhouse: Historically important areas that provided public access and recreation along the Rock River. This location is locally notable as the site where future President Ronald Reagan served as a lifeguard during his youth.
- Woodcote: A rustic structure planned in 1909, initially intended as a caretaker's lodge and public amenity, rather than a Lowell family estate.
- Vaile and Pitcher Shelters: Additional rustic shelters designed to integrate seamlessly with the natural landscape.
- Ruth Edwards Nature Center: The park's main educational hub, which was expanded in the 1990s to include a dedicated classroom. The center's mission focuses on environmental education and promoting responsible stewardship of the natural environment.
- Boles Trail: The park preserves one of the few remaining segments of the historic Boles Trail, which once ran from Peoria to Galena.

== National Register Listing ==
The park was added to the National Register of Historic Places on August 8, 2006. Its designation is founded on NRHP Criterion C (Design/Construction), recognizing the park's design as a significant work of art by landscape architect Ossian Cole Simonds.
