= John Nolen =

American architect and writer (1869–1937)

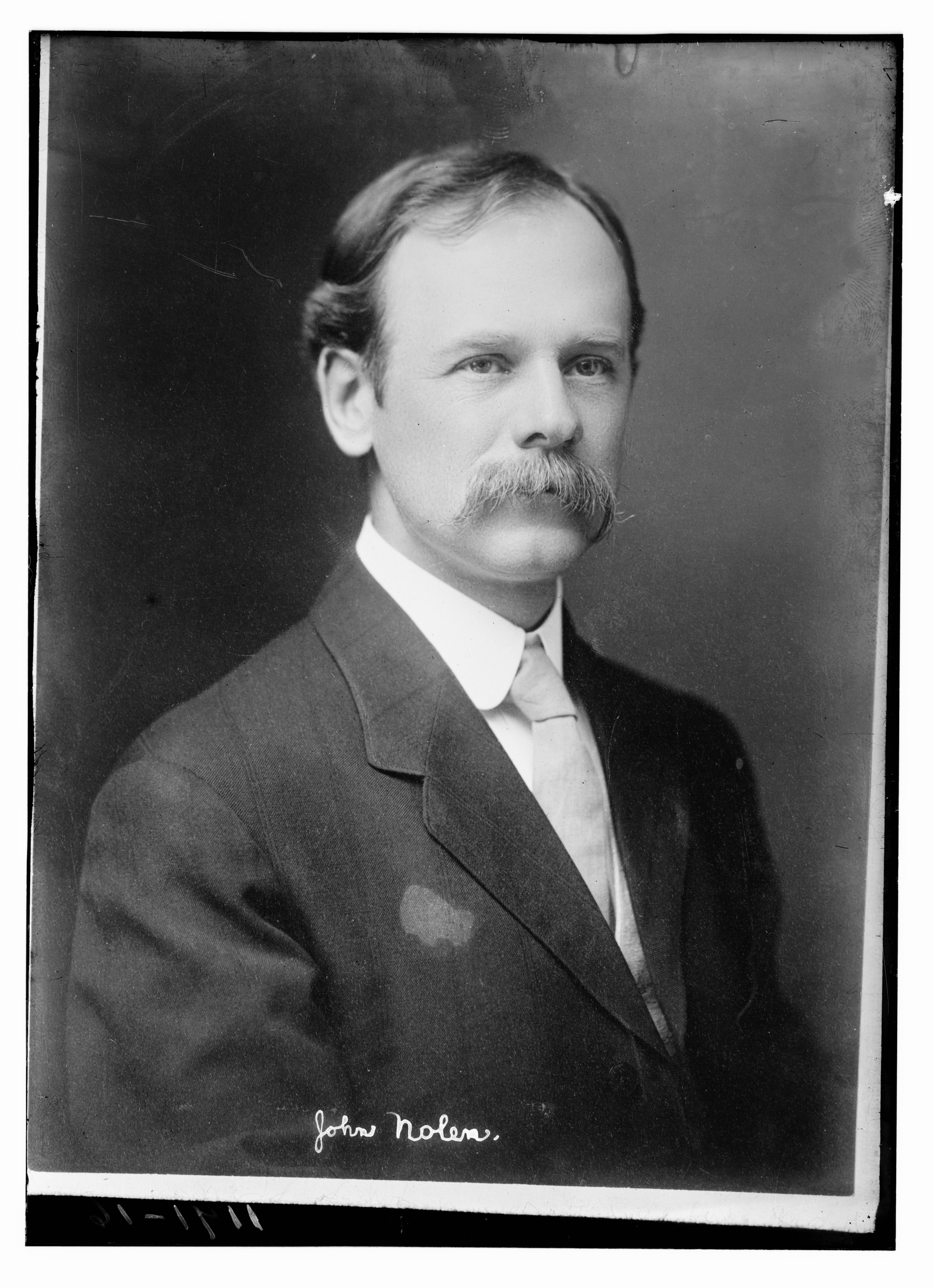
- Born: June 14, 1869; Philadelphia, Pennsylvania, U.S.
- Died: February 18, 1937 (aged 67); Cambridge, Massachusetts, U.S.
- Education: Girard College; Wharton School; Harvard University
- Occupations: Architect, writer

John Nolen (June 14, 1869 – February 18, 1937) was an American landscape architect, planning consultant, founding member of the American City Planning Institute (now the American Institute of Planners) and a writer.

== Biography ==
Born in Philadelphia, Pennsylvania, Nolen was orphaned as a child and placed in Girard College. After he graduated first in his class in 1884, he worked as a grocery clerk and secretary to the Girard Estate Trust Fund before enrolling in the Wharton School of Finance and Economics at the University of Pennsylvania in 1891. Nolen earned a Ph.B. in 1893, and for the next ten years worked as secretary of the American Society for the Extension of University Teaching. He married Barbara Schatte in 1896.

In 1903, Nolen sold his house and used the money to enroll in the newly established Harvard School of Landscape Architecture, under instructors Frederick Law Olmsted Jr., Arthur Shurtleff, and B.M. Watson. He received an A.M. in 1905 from Harvard.

== Early career ==
He established an office in Cambridge, Massachusetts, where he and his associates branched out into city planning, as well as landscape architecture. Nolen was a frequent lecturer on city and town planning, and was active in many professional organizations, including the American City Planning Institute (now American Institute of Planners), American Civic Association (now Urban America), American Society of Landscape Architects, American Society of Planning Officials, International Garden Cities and Town-Planning Federation, National Conference on City Planning (now Urban America), and the Town Planning Institute of England.

Nolen completed a number of projects in Wisconsin as well as earlier efforts in Virginia, Georgia, and particularly, San Diego, California. His prestige as an innovative urban planner was firmly established. By 1919, Nolen had written two books, edited two others, and published dozens of articles. In 1927, he was elected president of the National Conference on City Planning. Nolen was the official landscape architect to such municipalities as Kingsport Tennessee; Madison, Wisconsin; Asheville, North Carolina; Montclair, New Jersey; Reading, Pennsylvania; Roanoke, Virginia; San Diego, California; New London, Connecticut; Bristol, Connecticut; Savannah, Georgia; and Schenectady, New York.

== Comprehensive city planning ==
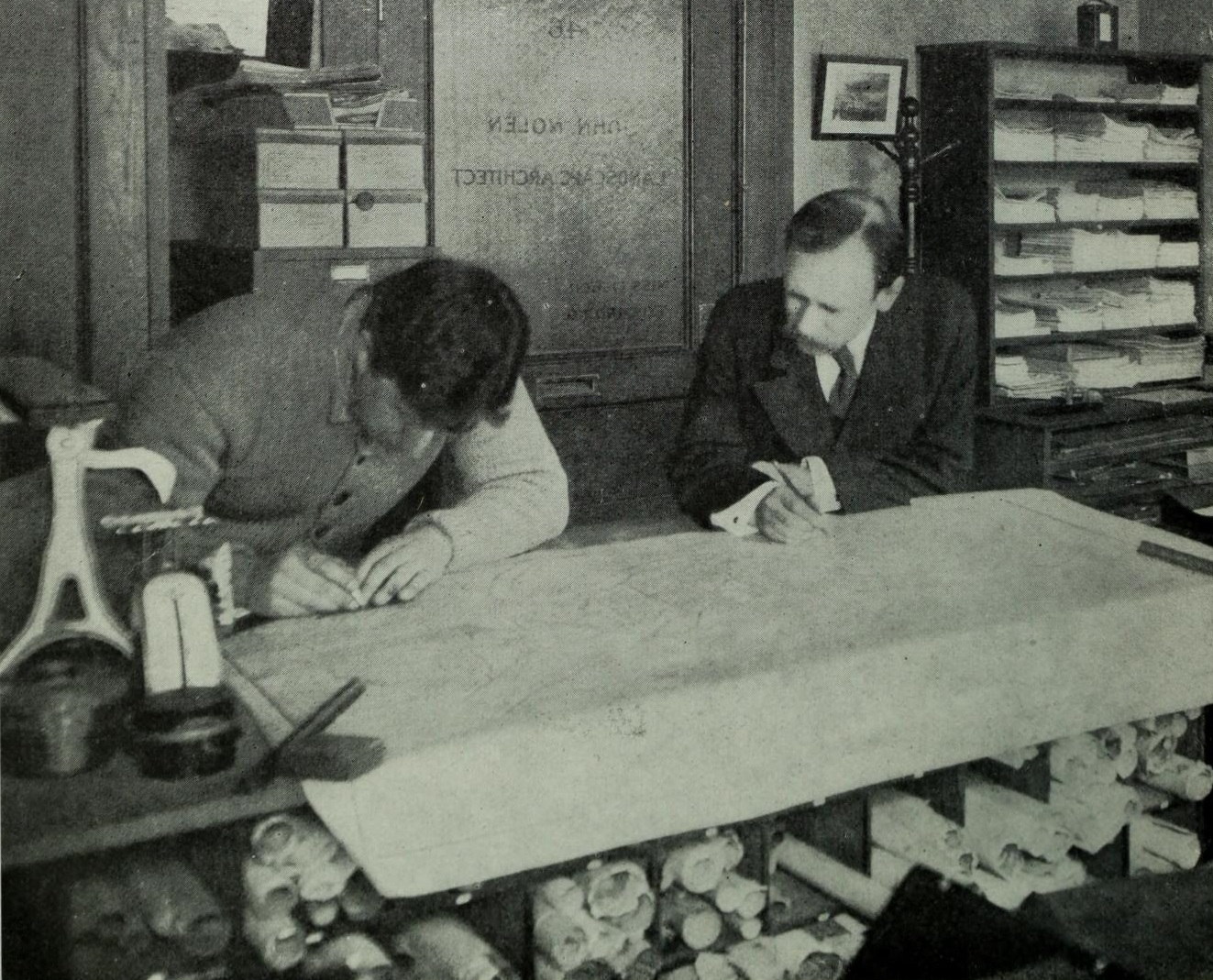
Mr. John Nolen at work on a city plan

After his success with Mariemont, Ohio, Nolen moved on to Florida to plan what he called, "the last frontier." In February 1922, he contracted with St. Petersburg to design Florida's first comprehensive plan. The city, he found, occupied a "site blessed by a benevolent Nature" and possessing "the same characteristics as southern France." After signing the contract, Nolen wrote an associate, "This seems to be an opportunity to do rather more than we have ever been given the chance to do before."

In March 1923, Nolen completed an ambitious plan to imbue this resort city of 15,000 with a "form and flavor unlike that of other places." A greenbelt of preserves and parks encircled the lower third (45 square miles) of the Pinellas Peninsula, setting the city's "natural boundaries" and creating a lure for tourists. He also presented plans to improve traffic connections and establish a civic center. Mixed-use neighborhood centers were clustered to prevent the unsightly spread of commercial uses and traffic problems along city thoroughfares. A system of parkways united the city, providing pedestrian access to parks and local neighborhood centers with store groups, churches, and public buildings.

Nolen's plan rested on the "adequate control of private development." He proposed a series of land-use controls to ensure that development followed the efficient outlay of public facilities, rather than outline speculative desires. Without these regulations, Nolen was hardly sanguine about the city's future. "It has been said and with reason," he wrote, "that man is the only animal who desecrates the surroundings of his own habitation."

In the midst of the great Florida land boom, the desire to make quick profits outweighed any lofty notion of city building. Moreover, the idea of investing public funds to improve the squalid conditions in "the colored section" found little sentiment in a place, where one anti-planning editor advocated replacing black laborers (17 percent of the population) with immigrants from the "agricultural sections of England". In a referendum, Nolen's planning initiative received only 13 percent of the vote.

The St. Petersburg experience disheartened Nolen, but he remained optimistic. His firm worked on 54 projects in Florida, including city plans for Clearwater, Sarasota, and West Palm Beach, new town plans for Clewiston and Belleair, and neighborhood plans for University Park (Gainesville) and San Jose Estates (Jacksonville). In 1925, Nolen finally found in "Venice an opportunity better ... than any other in Florida to apply the most advanced and most practical ideas of regional planning." Nolen planned Venice for the Brotherhood of Locomotive Engineers (BLE), a labor union looking to capitalize on the land boom. The BLE, however, was also investing for the long term. BLE officials envisioned a regional center for agriculture and light industry, "a place where the ordinary man could have a chance to get all that the rich have ever been able to get out of Florida."

"Nature led the way" and the plan, Nolen wrote, "followed her way". Greenbelts protected important natural features, and parkways extended from the hinterlands into Venice's downtown (Figure 1). A greenbelt bounded the town to the east and south, while Venice Bay marked the northern edge and the Gulf of Mexico lay to the west. Nolen paid special attention to the town's Gulf-front location. A linear park ran along the waterfront, with an amphitheater and beachfront park lying at the terminus of Venice Parkway, which connected the beach to the Civic Center.

The Civic Center's grouping of parks and public buildings offered a view of the Gulf and marked the western edge of the commercial core. From this point east, Venice Parkway narrowed to Venice Avenue, which ran the center of a three-block commercial core between the Civic Center and Rialto Avenue. The Civic Center not only defined the town center, but it stood midway between the commercial core and Venice's most sublime natural feature — the Gulf of Mexico.

In Venice, Nolen effectively balanced his design between two transcendental ideals — civic virtue and nature. From City Hall, one could view the palette of nature while surrounded by the physical form of the "civic spirit". An ideal site for contemplation, a vision of nature was always at hand, but it never remained the same, shifting with the tides and the seasons.

Two diagonal avenues defined the neighborhoods lying between the Gulf and the Civic Center. School sites and the commercial center provided focal points for neighborhoods. Common greens and playgrounds were provided in each neighborhood, while a wedge-shaped golf course buffered the eastern section of town from the railway and industrial uses.

Nolen also placed Harlem Village east of the railway, surrounding it with "white farms". Segregation was a staple of southern life, and if Nolen failed to fight the southern caste system directly, he remained adamant that African Americans receive the benefits of good planning. In Venice, like other southern cities, he connected African-American neighborhoods to the larger community via a parkway. In cities separated by race, interconnected parkways offered the hope of uniting diverse people through "nature" and to, Nolen wrote, "the brotherhood of man".

The BLE invested heavily in infrastructure, before the land boom crashed in 1927. Nolen's plan remained a guiding vision (although Harlem Village was nixed), and Venice stands as the most complete example of the garden city in Florida. Neighborhoods segregated by class and cost were connected by parkways and linked to the Civic Center. Combining the lines of nature with a civic orientation, Venice offered, Nolen wrote, "an inspiration to those who would make this world a better place to live."

At the 1926 National City Planning Conference, held in St. Petersburg, Nolen presented Venice in his presidential address, "New Communities to Meet New Conditions". More than any other state, Nolen believed, Florida needed "a state plan" to "regulate reasonably" the location of future towns and cities. Nolen envisioned a state of interconnected garden cities based on Venice's regional and town plan. Although Nolen's agenda never moved beyond the conference, his vision drew admirers.

A year later, Lewis Mumford, in the keynote address to the same conference, proclaimed, "At least one planner realizes where the path of intelligent and humane achievement will lead during the next generation." Both Mumford and Nolen advocated regional planning and the new town as the means to channel urbanization into a higher level of civilization. They also saw planning as an art form that revealed mankind's highest aspirations. "City design" could only "succeed", Mumford remarked in his conclusion, "when the city planner tries to fathom and express ... what the best life possible is."

John Nolen died at his home in Cambridge on February 18, 1937.

== Impact on Wisconsin ==
Nolen developed plans for the University of Wisconsin, the city of Madison, and the state park system. His comprehensive approach blended social, economic, and physical aspects of urban life with the preservation of natural beauty. He felt strongly that:

... simple recreation in the open air amid beautiful surroundings contributes to physical and moral health, to a saner and happier life ...

— John Nolen

His plan for the city of Madison is considered a preeminent example of the urban landscape movement. Nolen later cited the grounds surrounding Worcester College as an inspiration for his plans for Madison.

In 1908, John Olin of the Madison Park and Pleasure Drive Association contacted Nolen for advice in laying out Madison city parks. Without the money to pay Nolen, Olin enlisted the support of the city, the University of Wisconsin, and the state. Together, they devised a contract to have Nolen make recommendations for the beautification of each.

Perhaps Nolen's most important contribution, though, was his plan for a state park system. Having seen the rapid deforestation of northern Wisconsin, the depletion of mineral resources in the southwest, and increasing urban development, Nolen was hired not only to find locations for parks but also to provide a reason for their existence. He recommended the creation of four state parks and provided guidelines for the establishment of a state park system.

Nolen's legacy lives on in Madison. One of Madison's main thoroughfares, John Nolen Drive, is named after him. A strava cycling segment, named "John Nolen" in his honor, is a 1.4 mile stretch of bike path adjacent to John Nolen Drive. Nolen Shore, a twelve-story, 145-foot-tall (44 m) high-rise building named after him, was completed in 2006.

Tenney Park-Yahara River Parkway, which Nolen helped design, is listed on the National Register of Historic Places.

== Bibliography ==
- Madison: A Model City (1911)
- New Ideals in the Planning of Cities Towns and Villages (1919)
- New Towns for Old (1927)
