= Tenney Park – Yahara River Parkway =

- U.S. National Register of Historic Places
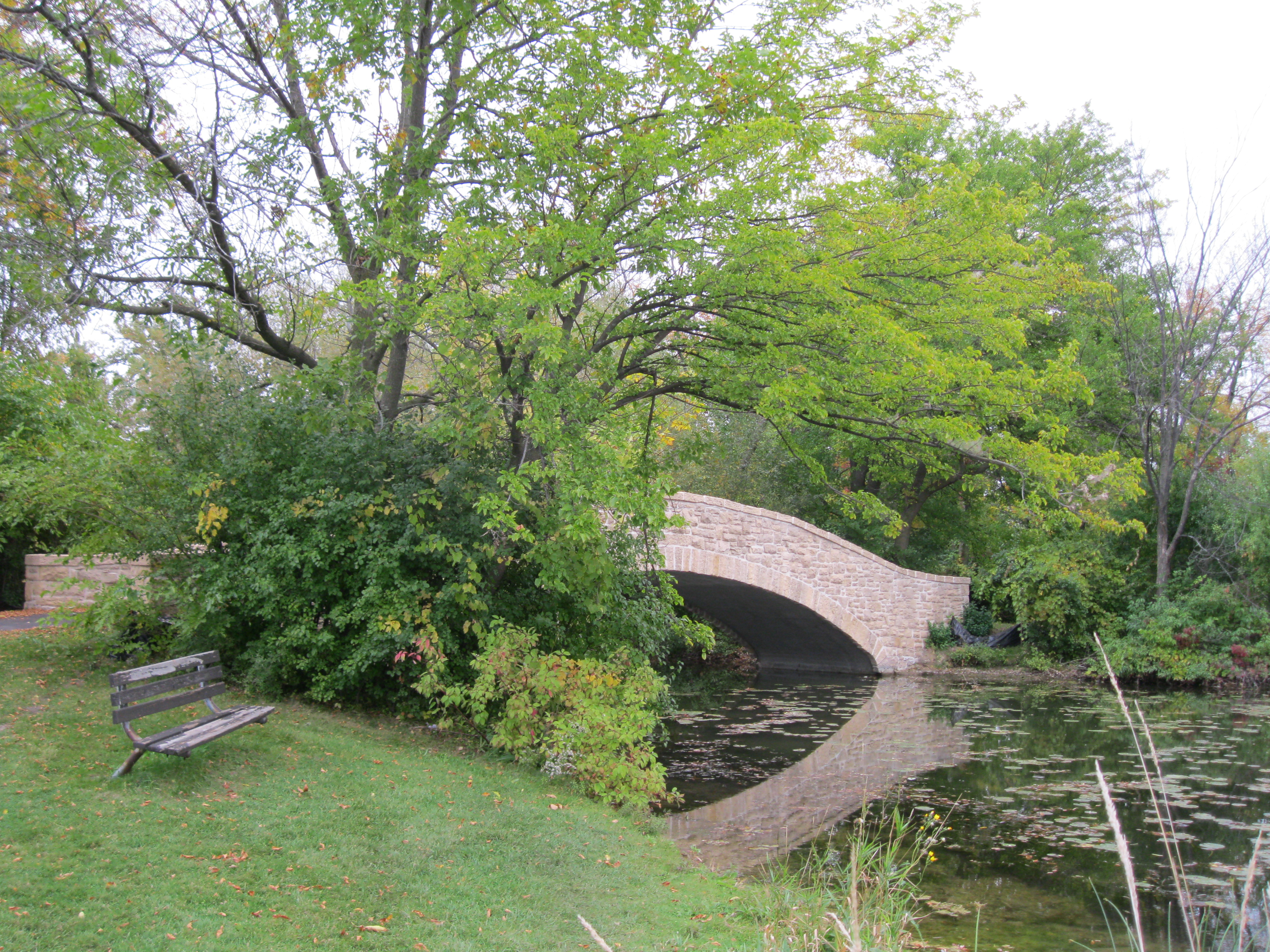
- A footbridge in Tenney Park.
- Location: 1220 E. Johnson St.; 501 S. Thornton Ave., Madison, Wisconsin
- Area: 61 acres (25 ha)
- Architect: Ossian Cole Simonds/John Nolen
- NRHP reference No.: 99001173
- Added to NRHP: September 17, 1999

Tenney Park – Yahara River Parkway are two historic parks developed from 1900 to 1911 along the Yahara River in Madison, Wisconsin. Both were designed by Ossian Cole Simonds, the father of Prairie School landscape architecture. The parkway runs parallel with the Yahara River, leading to the park where the river meets Lake Mendota. In 1999, the park and parkway were successfully nominated and listed on the State and the National Register of Historic Places.

== History ==
Before White settlement, when the Four Lakes region was home to Native Americans, the Yahara River meandered from Lake Mendota through marsh and swamps, across the isthmus to Lake Monona. In 1849 future governor Leonard J. Farwell dammed the Yahara where it flows out of Lake Mendota and in 1850-1851 built a five-story flour mill on the west bank. The Yahara, then called Catfish Creek, was at some point straightened - apparently by 1885.

Madison had been platted in 1836. The community's growth was slow until 1848, when it was selected as the state capital and the location of the University of Wisconsin. In the 1870s the arrival of rail service began to make the city a regional commercial center, and in the 1880s its manufacturing sector began to grow, with manufacture of agricultural implements and later batteries and other goods. Much of the initial growth occurred around the capitol, but as the decades passed, the surrounding areas began to fill in, reaching east up the isthmus.

Madison had no public parks for its first fifty years, until residents of the Sixth Ward pushed for a park, raised money, and created Orton Park themselves in 1887. The 1893 World's Columbian Exposition in Chicago placed its neoclassical buildings in an attractive, clean setting among lagoons and fountains, sparking an interest in public parks in many places. Inspired by that trend, the Madison Park and Pleasure Drive Association was formed in 1894, with an initial goal of developing scenic carriage roads along Lake Mendota. But carriage roads didn't help the majority who couldn't afford a horse.

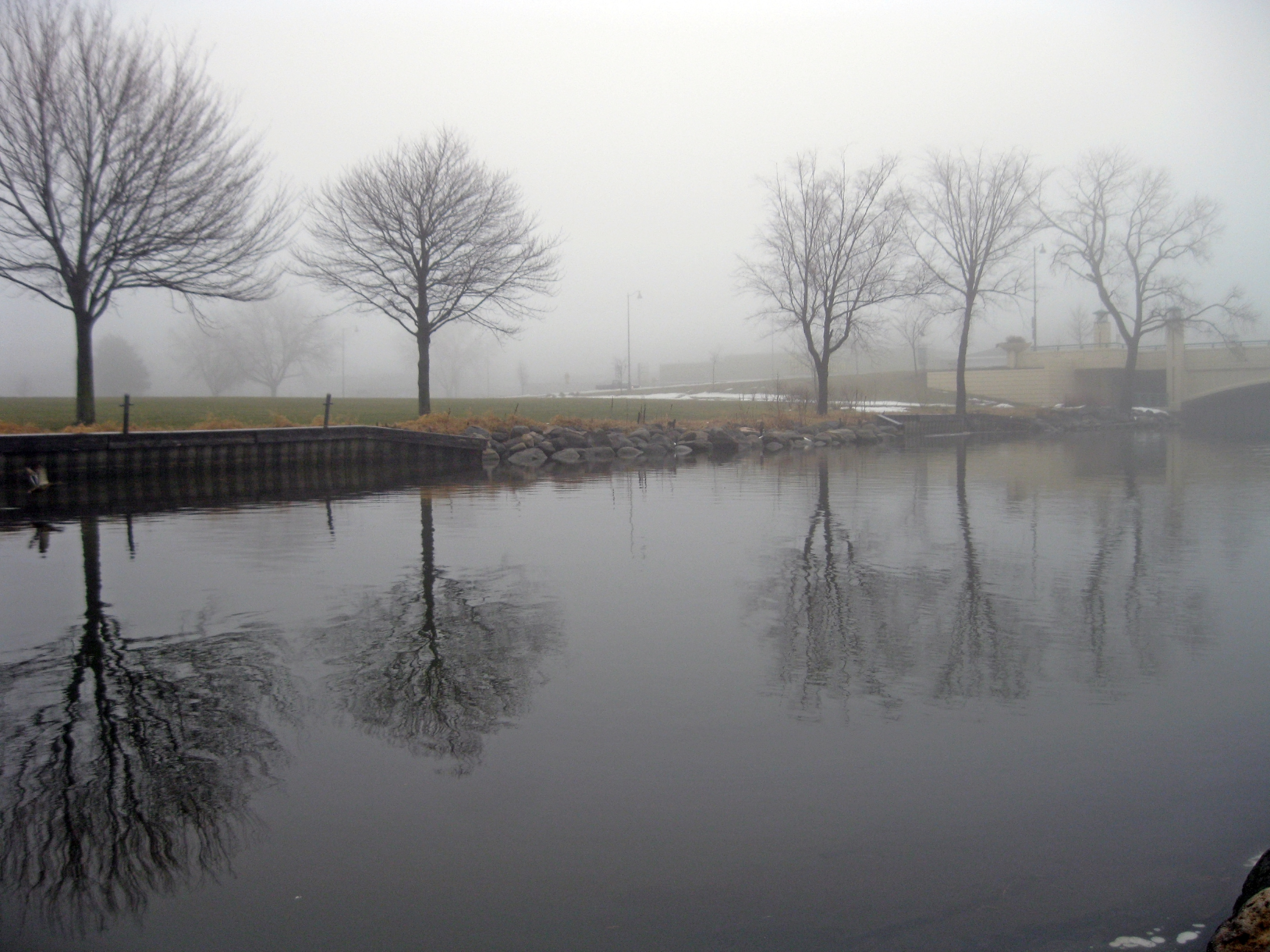
Foggy morning in Tenney Park, 2013

Then in 1899 fourteen acres of land, including the ruins of Farwell's old flour mill, became available on the west bank of the Yahara on the Lake Mendota end. Anna and Mary Thornton offered to sell it to the city to become a park. By this time the Yahara River was the east edge of Madison. Much of the land along the river was marshy - at times a dumping ground for the city's dead horses and pets. Several road and railroad bridges crossed the Yahara. A brewery stood east of the Yahara, Fuller and Johnson had a factory on the west side, and homes were approaching. The Park and Pleasure Drive Association urged the city to buy the land, but the City Council had not yet accepted that public parks were the city's responsibility. Daniel K. Tenney, lawyer and activist, offered to buy the fourteen acres for the city and add $2,500 for development of a park if another $2,500 was raised from other sources. The city contributed $1,500, but the park was initially left to the MPPDA to develop. In contrast to the MPPDA's "pleasure drives," this would be a public park for the common man, so it marks a turning point for the MPPDA.

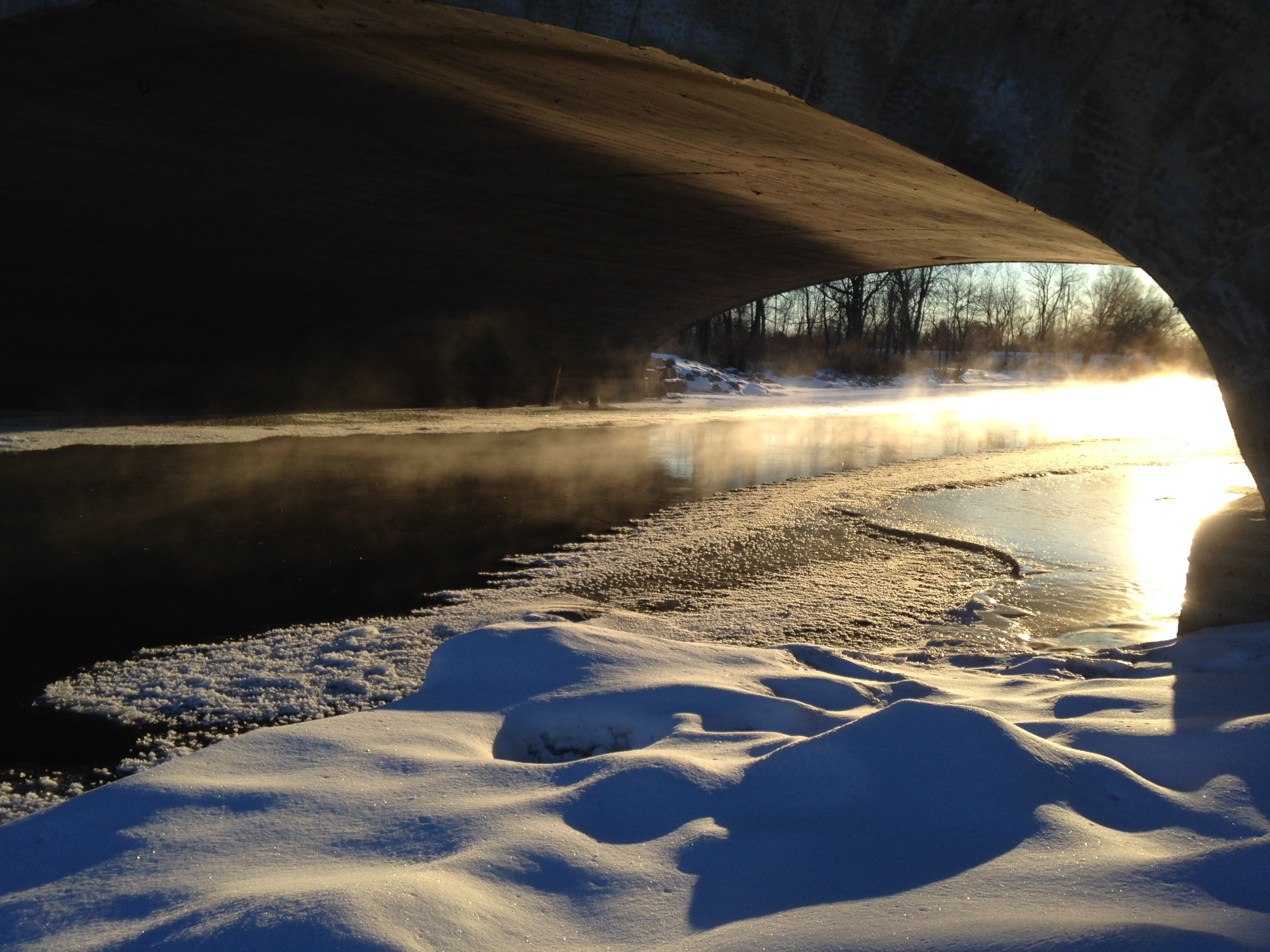
January, 2014

John Olin, head of the MPPDA, hired landscape architect Ossian Cole Simonds of Chicago to design the park. Simonds is considered the founder of the Prairie School of landscape architecture, which advocated restoring and highlighting natural landscape features using local materials and native plants in a picturesque way, as opposed to formal, geometric designs. Applying this aesthetic to the Yahara River area, in 1900 Simonds designed the first 14-acre section of the park around a winding lagoon dotted with small islands and surrounded by curving paths through scattered beds of mostly-native plants. The city constructed a station in Lake Mendota to pump sand from the lake bottom to fill parts of the park. This first section of the park was complete in April of 1903.

Tenney Park was expanded in 1903 when the city bought five lots between Sherman Avenue and Lake Mendota, adding 250 feet of Mendota lake frontage to the park.

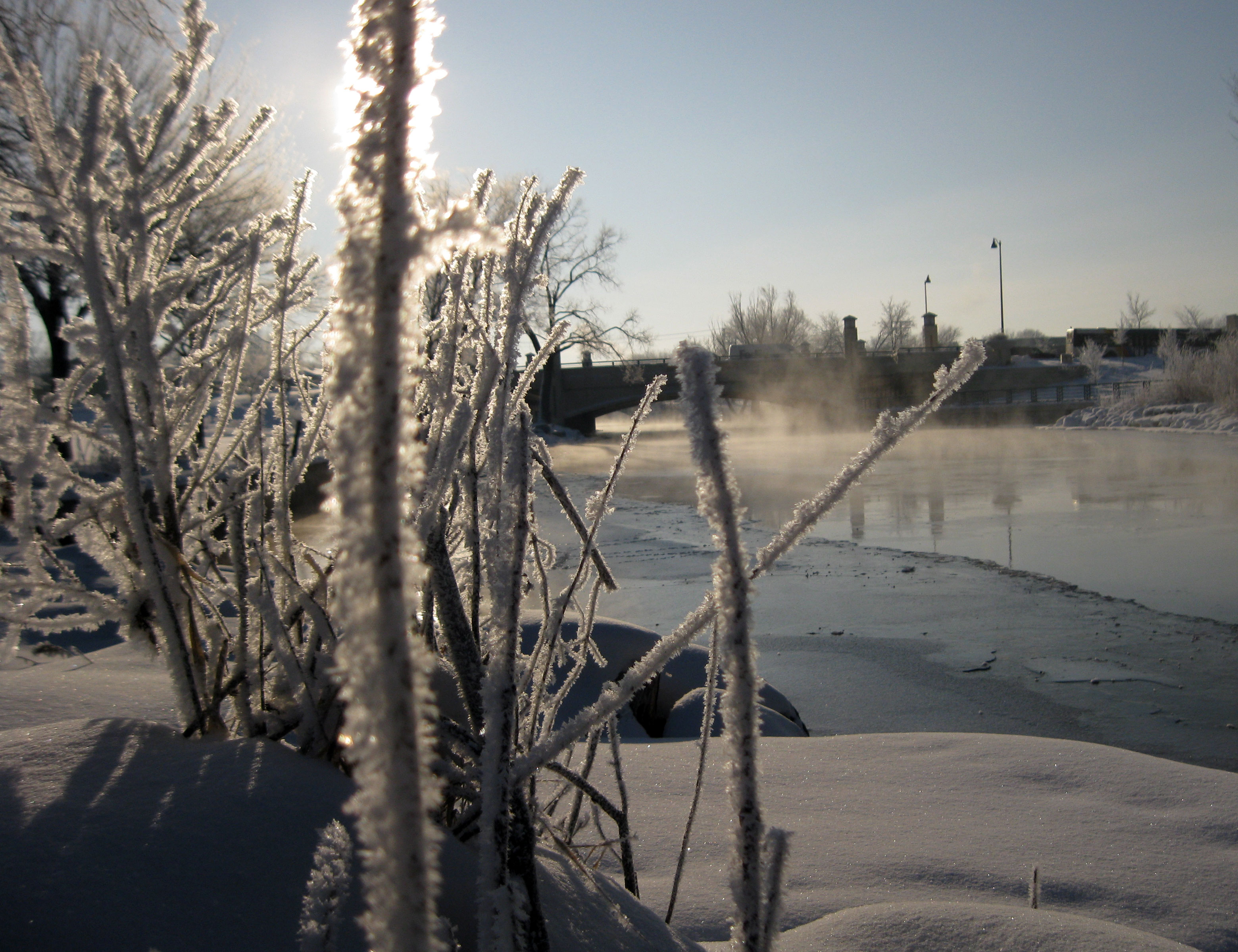
February, 2013

About that time, John Olin proposed another idea: to artificially enlarge the Yahara River to let small boats cross the isthmus between Mendota and Monona, with a scenic parkway with walking trails along each bank. This would require dredging the river, raising existing road and railway bridges, and building a lock at the outlet of Lake Mendota, so it was no small undertaking. Olin pitched the idea to a group of prominent citizens at the home of William F. Vilas. Daniel Tenney opposed the plan because boat owners would benefit the most, but it was supported by park advocates, city boosters, owners of adjacent properties, and indeed the boat owners. Vilas persuaded the two railroad companies to raise their bridges. 56 teamsters pledged to donate loads of crushed stone, and private parties donated land for the project and pledged $20,000. Significantly, nearly half the monetary donations were small - $10 or less - the first time such a project had such broad support. Simonds designed the parkway, like Tenney Park, in Prairie style, with narrow, meandering paths and groupings of native plants like maple, viburnum, basswood, dogwood, oak and elm. Bridges were raised and the lock built, as planned. The Williamson Street Bridge still stands largely as built in 1904. The parkway was completed in 1906.

A third section of Tenney Park began taking shape in 1905 when the MPPDA bought 21 acres of adjacent marsh from the Thorntons. Some of that land was platted as Parkside Subdivision and sold to recoup part of the city's investment. The remaining 15 acres were added to Tenney Park. With more space, Simonds added a second lagoon connected to the first, which included part of the original bed of the Yahara from before it was straightened. The addition also added Marston Avenue on the west end of the park.

In 1908, during construction of that third section of the park, Madison's new landscape architect John Nolen adjusted the plan. The impetus was that so far the new park had not attracted many visitors. Simonds' design had five small islands in the lagoon, which were picturesque from the paths, but the feeling was that Tenney Park was a passive experience, where you walked or floated and looked. To make the park more active and interesting for the users, Nolen proposed filling part of the lagoon to create one 10-acre island with space for a ball field and other attractions. With this change of direction, Nolen continued Simonds' style of landscaping; he specified 96 varieties of plantings of which 85% were native.

In 1908 the city bought one last section to add to the park, adding 350 feet of lakefront in the Willow Creek subdivision. Nolen designed a beach and playground and a Prairie School outhouse was designed by George B. Ferry.

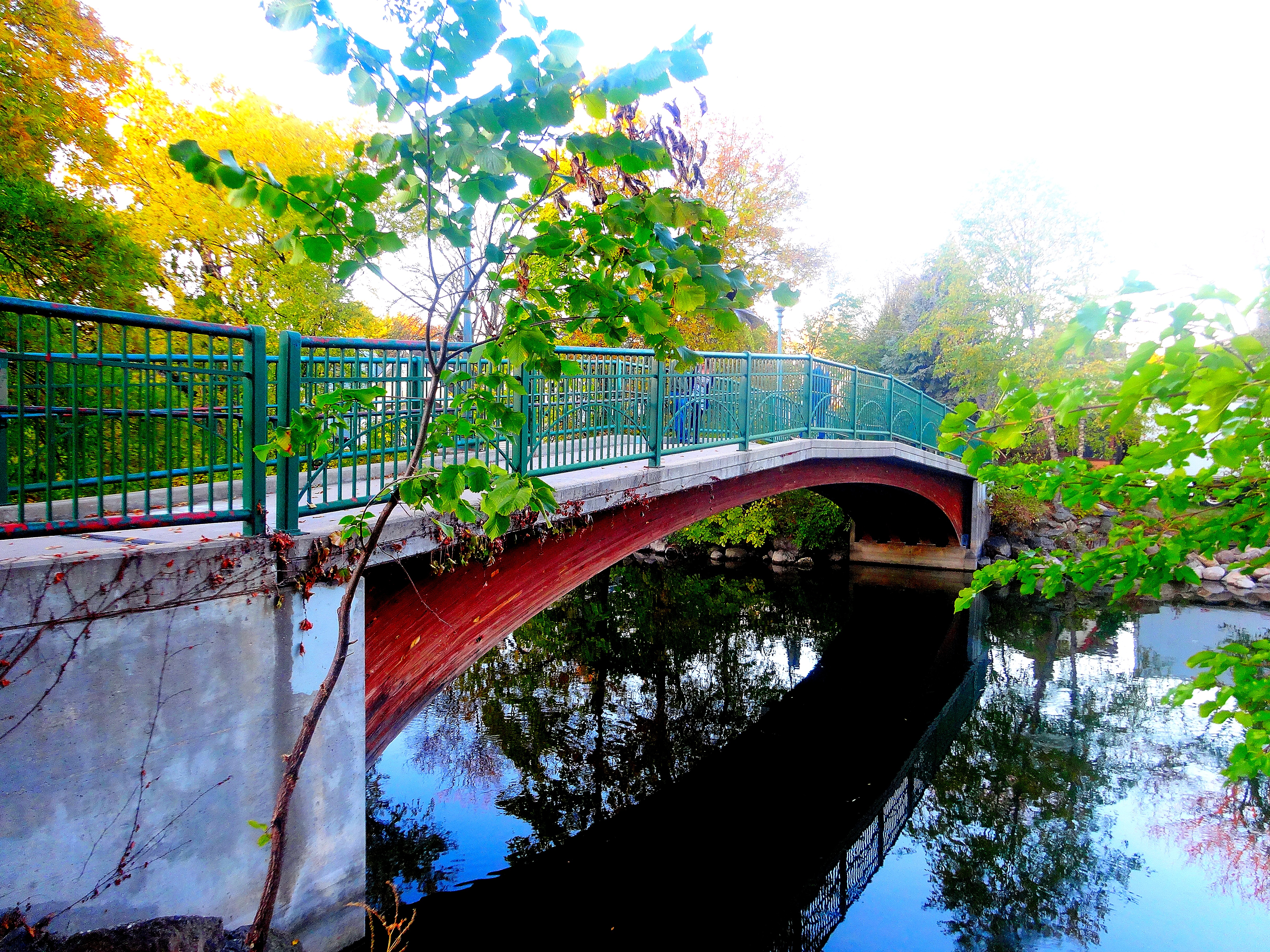
Jenifer Street pedestrian bridge in October, 2014

When all the initial development was done in 1912, the park totaled 44.2 acres and had cost a total of $79,650. But improvements continued. The Marston Avenue bridge was added in 1912 and a bath house in 1913. The park was hosting concerts in 1913, tennis courts were added in 1915, and that winter the lagoon was cleared for ice skating. Baseball games were played there by 1920. Utilization increased, vindicating the idea of making the park a more active experience. Improvements and adjustments have continued in the years since.

In 1999 Tenney Park and the Yahara River Parkway were together placed on the National Register of Historic Places, considered significant for several reasons. The parks were developed by the Madison Park and Pleasure Drive Association, a volunteer organization that changed Madison. The creation of Tenney Park shifted MPPDA to develop in-city parks for the general public, in addition to pleasure drives for the wealthy. The creation of the two parks "triggered an era of park philanthropy" from modest donors as well as the wealthy. They were also Madison's first in-city parks that provided public access to lakes. Finally, these parks are "excellent, intact" examples of Prairie School landscape architectural design, and important works of O.C. Simonds, the founder of that style.
