= Ossian Cole Simonds =

American landscape designer

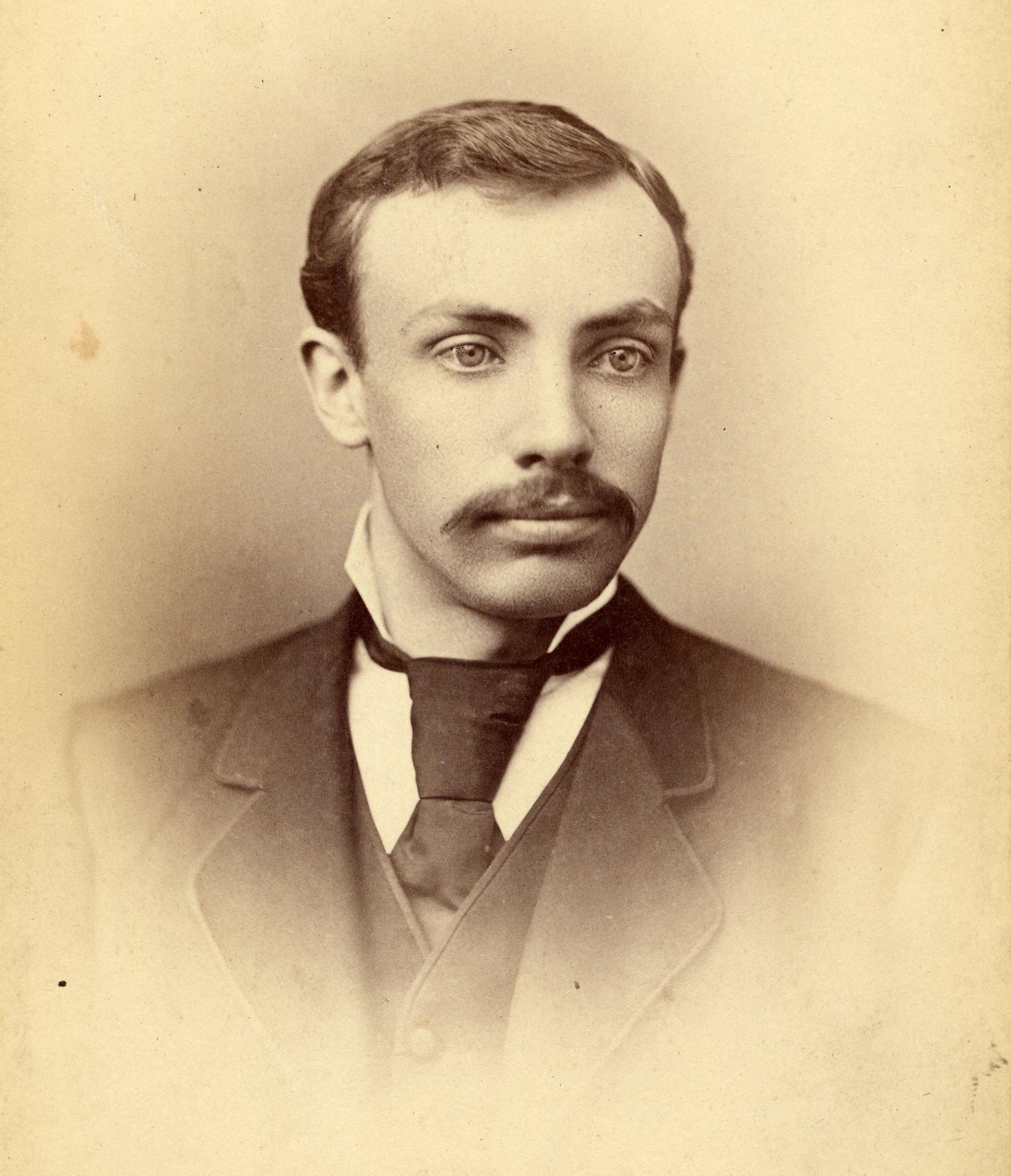
- Portrait, c. 1878
- Born: 1855; Grand Rapids, Michigan, U.S.
- Died: 1931 (aged 75–76)
- Education: University of Michigan
- Occupation: Landscape designer

Ossian Cole Simonds (November 11, 1855 – November 20, 1931), often known as O. C. Simonds, was an American landscape designer. He preferred the term 'landscape gardener' to that of 'landscape architect'. A number of Simonds' works are listed on the U.S. National Register of Historic Places (NRHP).

== Early life and education ==
Simonds was born in Grand Rapids, Michigan, on November 11, 1855, where he developed a love of nature through his explorations of its woods. From 1874 to 1878, he studied civil engineering at the University of Michigan and, briefly, architecture with William Le Baron Jenney.

== Career ==
In 1878, Simonds joined Jenney's architectural practice in Chicago. His first project was Graceland Cemetery where he learned naturalistic English-style landscape design. Through Jenney's tutelage, he learned how to use native plants in landscape design, an unusual practice at the time. He studied local woods, hydrology, and topography leading him to be credited with the creation of the Prairie Style along with Jens Jensen, and Walter Burley Griffin. In 1880, Graceland was increasingly deferring to Simonds about the amount of work and money required to develop the property's eastern section before Jenney which led to ending Jenney's involvement in the project. This led to Simonds establishing the firm of Holabird & Simonds to carry out the work. In 1881, Martin Roche, who had also worked in Jenney's office, joined them as a third partner. In 1883, Simonds left the firm to concentrate solely to become the superintendent at Graceland. His work at Graceland led him to be called the "dean of cemetery design." In 1897, he left his position at Graceland but continued to be their landscape consultant for the rest of his career. In 1900, the cemetery was awarded a silver medal at the Exposition Universelle in Paris for its landscape and later a Medal of Honor by the Architectural League of New York in 1925.

In 1888, Ossian Cole Simonds' first project after Graceland was to create a site plan for Fort Sheridan which was to include a parade ground for drills. Simonds used a natural ravine to boarder the meadow created for the purpose. A scenic drive was incorporated into the plan which showcased natural vistas and brick and stone officers' housing. The effect of the plan was lauded as picturesque and charming.

In 1899, he was a founding member of the American Society of Landscape Architects, and served as its president in 1913.

In 1903, Simonds formed Simonds and Company and was awarded the redesign and extension of Chicago's Lincoln Park with Bryan Lathrop and Francis T. Simmons. The plan was to double the parks 275 acres by extending it into Lake Michigan and later extended it north approximately 1,000 acres. To update the older sections, he incorporated winding pathways and facilities so as not to compromise the landscape. He relied on natural topography to create naturalistic "rooms" and scenic meadow vistas. He also designed golf courses, Belle Meade, city parks, town plans, universities including Iowa State and the University of Maryland, residences, and private estates around the country.

In 1920, Simonds authored Landscape Gardening. In the book, he lays out his approach to landscape design which looks to nature to inform the design. This included the use of native plants, the use of greenways, and warning of urban sprawl. He also founded the Chair of Landscape Design at the University of Michigan (U of M). In 1929, he was honored with a master's of arts from U of M.

In 1922, Simonds designed the grounds of the Morton Arboretum in Lisle, Illinois.

Simonds died November 20, 1931, after an extended illness in Chicago.

== Landscape design ==
- Cummer Gardens, 829 Riverside Ave. Jacksonville, FL Simonds, Ossian Cole, NRHP-listed
- Lake Forest Cemetery, 1525 N. Lake Rd. Lake Forest, IL Simonds, Ossian Cole, NRHP-listed
- Library Park, 711 59th Place Kenosha, WI Simonds, Ossian Cole, NRHP-listed
- Lincoln Park, 2045 Lincoln Park W. Chicago, IL Simonds, Ossian Cole, NRHP-listed
- Lowell Park, 2114 Lowell Park Rd. Dixon, IL Simonds, Ossian Cole, NRHP-listed
- Riverview Park, 2000 Harrison Hill Hannibal, MO Simonds, Ossian Cole, NRHP-listed
- Sharon Cemetery, County Road J40 Farmington, IA, Simonds, O.C., NRHP-listed
- Tenney Park-Yahara River Parkway, 1220 E. Johnson St.; 501 S. Thornton Ave. Madison, WI Simonds, Ossian Cole, NRHP-listed
- Washington Park, Bounded by Fayette Ave., Williams Blvd., Walnut St., MacArthur Blvd., S. Grand Ave. and Chatham Rd. Springfield, IL Simonds, Ossian Cole, NRHP-listed
- Hill House, Mill Neck, NY, Residence of Anton Gysberti Hodenpyl
- Cedar Bend Nature Area, 1495 Cedar Bend Dr, Ann Arbor, MI 48109
- John Henes Park, 201 Henes Park Drive, Menominee, MI 49858
- Brucemore, a site of the National Trust for Historic Preservation, 2160 Linden Dr. SE, Cedar Rapids, IA 52403
- Pier Cove Ravine, a nature reserve on the shores of Lake Michigan, south of Saugatuck, MI and west of Fennville, MI, at approximately 2308 Lakeshore Dr, Fennville, MI 49408
- Morton Arboretum, 4100 Illinois Route 53 Lisle, IL 60532 https://acorn.mortonarb.org/Detail/entities/1502
