= Girard College =

Independent boarding school in Philadelphia, PA, USA

- Philadelphia, Pennsylvania

Information
- School type: Independent, boarding
- Opened: 1848; 178 years ago
- Grades: 1–12
- Gender: Coeducational
- Enrollment: 2016-2017: 311; Elementary School (1-5): 122; Middle School (6-8): 89; High School (9-12): 100
- Average class size: Elementary-Middle School: 12-15; High School: 15-18
- Athletics conference: Penn-Jersey Athletic Association
- Team name: Cavaliers
- Website: www.girardcollege.edu
- Girard College Complex
- U.S. National Register of Historic Places
- Girard College Complex
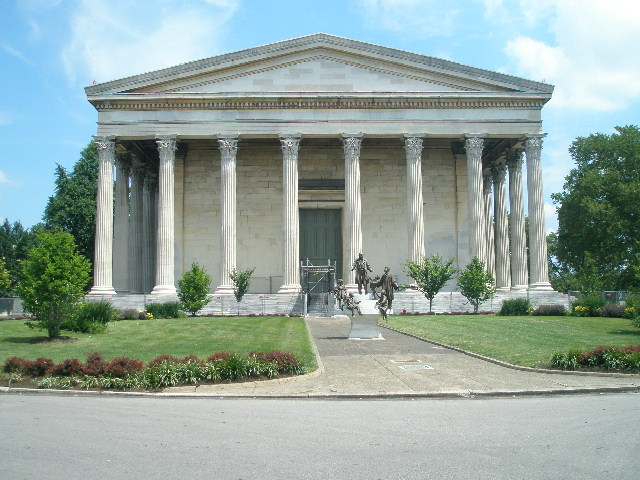

- Location within Philadelphia Location within Pennsylvania Location within the United States
- Location: Bounded by Poplar St., Girard, W. College, S. College, and Ridge Aves., Philadelphia, Pennsylvania
- Area: 43 acres (17 ha)
- Built: 1833
- Architectural style: Colonial Revival, Greek Revival, Collegiate Gothic
- NRHP reference No.: 74001802

Significant dates
- Added to NRHP: October 29, 1974
- Designated PHMC: 1992

Girard College is an independent college preparatory five-day boarding school located on a 43-acre campus in Philadelphia, Pennsylvania. The school was founded and permanently endowed from the shipping and banking fortune of Stephen Girard upon his death in 1831.

== Stephen Girard's legacy ==
Born in the seaport city of Bordeaux, France, in 1750, Stephen Girard arrived in the city of Philadelphia, in May 1776, during the momentous summer of the American Revolutionary War and remained there for the rest of his life. During his 55 years in the city, he became the wealthiest American of his time and the fourth-wealthiest American of all time, adjusted for today's dollars.

With the assistance of noted attorney William J. Duane (1780–1865), in the 1820s, he wrote a long will and testament, outlining every detail of how his fortune would be used. Immediately after he died in 1831, the provisions of his will were made public. In addition to extensive personal and institutional bequests, he left the bulk of his fortune to the city of Philadelphia to build and operate a residential school. The bequest was the largest single act of philanthropy up to that time in American history.

The Girard Estate remains open in perpetuity. Its endowment and financial resources are held in trust by the courts of the Commonwealth of Pennsylvania, which provides much of the school's operating budget.

== History ==
Girard College was founded in 1833, three years before the establishment of the Central High School of Philadelphia. Both schools, along with Girls' High, acted as a type of "magnet school" type, with college prep/academic curricula, strict admission standards, and noted faculty and famous alumni with respected roles.

The buildings and classrooms for Girard took some time to design and construct with their expensive "Greek Revival" stone architecture, with monolithic columns, but were ready and opened on January 1, 1848, under provisions of Girard's will supervised by the appointed trustees, including banker and financier Nicholas Biddle, (1786–1844).

Girard's vision for the school can best be understood in the context of early 19th-century Philadelphia. The city was then at the forefront of creating innovative American institutions designed to solve a specific social challenge, such as the newly founded and constructed Eastern State Penitentiary (humane incarceration), the Pennsylvania Hospital (mental illness), the Pennsylvania Asylum for the Deaf and Dumb (disabilities), and the Franklin Institute (scientific knowledge). Girard chose to dedicate his immense fortune to helping educate young men of Philadelphia as Americans for the future.

Girard's will stipulated that students at Girard College must be "poor, white, male, orphans". For over a century, the school remained exclusive to orphaned white boys. However, in 1831, a mother who became a widow had no rights and resources, and "guardians" were often appointed by the "probate courts" or "orphan courts" of the city and state. Girard operated as a school for fatherless boys rather than children with no living parents or guardians. (In the 19th century, the college determined the legal definition of the term orphan to be "a fatherless child".)

From May 1954, with the U. S. Supreme Court decision in Brown vs. Board of Education of Topeka, Kansas, there was increasing pressure on Girard College to accept racial integration, as the city's public schools had long been. After an extended, bitter, 14-year civil-rights struggle led by Cecil B. Moore – including Martin Luther King Jr.'s August 1965 address to a crowd outside Girard's front gates ("[Philadelphia,] the cradle of liberty, that has ... a kind of Berlin Wall to keep the colored children of God out") – the first four black boys entered the school in September 1968.

Not part of the School District of Philadelphia, which had long been racially integrated (as being in a northern, formerly "free state"), Girard College was still considered "private" even though it had a very public educational mission and was racially segregated long before the consideration of the "Brown v. Board of Education" legal case. Girard College was ordered to desegregate by the U.S. Supreme Court's 1954 unanimous decision. Perhaps the key to the ruling was that Girard, following its founder's will, was administered by the "Board of Directors of City Trusts", and that public institution could not continue to maintain the historically outdated entrance requirement.

For fourteen years, the legal battle to desegregate Girard College continued. Beginning on May 1, Cecil B. Moore and the Philadelphia Freedom Fighters marched around the wall encompassing the campus for seven months in 1965. The initial pickets were met with strong resistance, directed by police chief Frank Rizzo. On the first day, 1,000 police officers lined the walls of the college. The police used repressive tactics toward the protests including motorcycle and foot charges into the crowds and arrests, beginning on May 5. Stanley Branche and seven other members of the Black Coalition Movement were arrested when they attempted to scale the walls. A highlight of these protests came on August 2 of that year when Dr. Martin Luther King Jr. came to the front gates of Girard's campus and addressed the protesters.

The first four African-American male students were finally admitted on September 11, 1968.

Sixteen years later, the policy of an all-male student body was also changed, and the first girls were admitted in 1984. The first female student was admitted as a first-grader in 1984, following further adjustments to the admission criteria that made the death of a father no longer required. Girls were gradually integrated into the college over a 12-year enrollment period, with subsequent female students permitted to enroll only in the same graduating class as the first female student or in a younger class. The first young woman graduated with a Girard diploma in 1993. The graduating class of 1996 was the first to have more female than male students, although it remains more or less balanced year to year. Current enrollment of Girard College in the 21st century is about evenly divided between boys and girls and about 90% African-American.

In May 2009, Girard College named Autumn Adkins as its 16th president, the first female chief administrator in its (then) 160-year existence. Adkins, now Autumn Adkins Graves, was not only the first woman but also the first African-American to head the college. Adkins resigned in 2012.

Following Adkins, Clarence D. Armbrister was the first African-American man to serve in this role. He was succeeded in 2018 by David P. Hardy.

== Program ==
All students live in single-sex dormitories arranged by grade level. Residential advisors occupy apartments in the dorm buildings. Girard requires that all students participate in the five-day program. All students go home on weekends. Girard is open to students of all religious backgrounds. Once a month at the beginning of the school day, however, all students attend a non-denominational assembly in the school's chapel. The chapel has a large pipe organ, designed and built by Ernest M. Skinner in 1933. The instrument is used for occasional concerts and has been recorded by such organists as Virgil Fox and Carlo Curley, who was director of music at Girard College in 1970 when he was 18 years old.

Entering 2016, enrollment at Girard was projected to be 311; of these, 122 were Elementary School students (grades 1 to 5), 89 were Middle School students, and 100 were High School students (grades 9 to 12). Girard employs 127 faculty members, of whom 71 are academic teachers, and 56 are residential advisers. Class sizes range from 12 to 20 students in the elementary school and from 16 to 22 students in the middle school. In the high school, honors classes have 15 students, and other classes have 20 to 25 students.

== Founder's Hall ==
- Founder's Hall, Girard College
- U.S. National Register of Historic Places
- U.S. National Historic Landmark
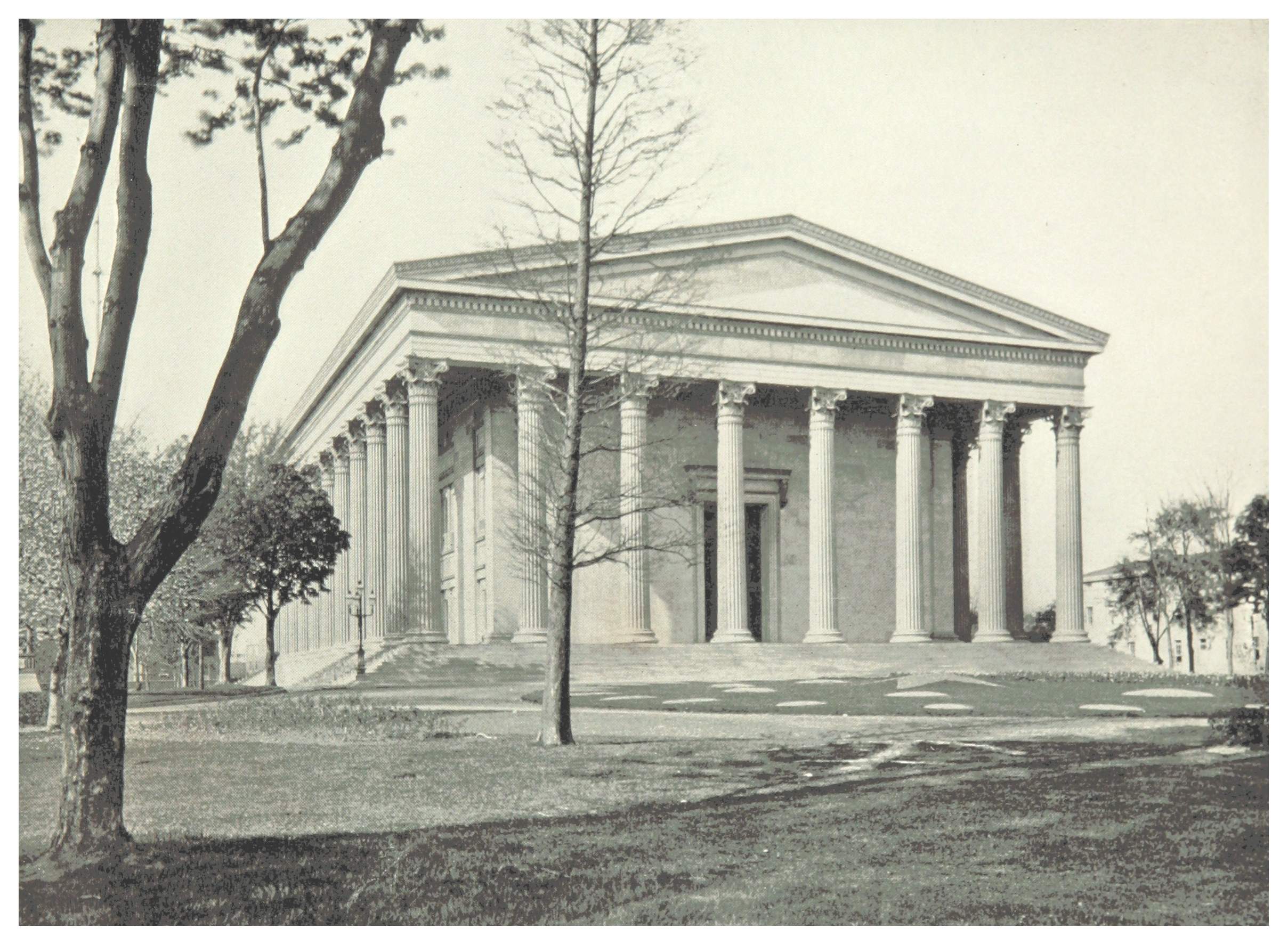
- Founders Hall (1897)
- Coordinates: 39°58′26″N 75°10′12″W
- Built: 1848
- NRHP reference No.: 69000158

Significant dates
- Added to NRHP: August 4, 1969
- Designated NHL: August 4, 1969

Founder's Hall at Girard College (1833–1847) is considered one of the finest examples of American Greek Revival architecture, for which it is designated a National Historic Landmark. School founder Girard specified in his will the dimensions and plan of the building. Nicholas Biddle (1786–1844) was chairman of the school's building committee, banker and financier, and president of the later revived and reorganized Second Bank of the United States in Philadelphia.

Girard's will demanded an architectural competition for the school's design. With his $2-million contribution, the 1832 competition was the first American architectural competition to be held nationally. The winning architect was Thomas Ustick Walter (1804–1887). After the Girard commission, Walter designed the dome of the United States Capitol in Washington, D.C. He returned to Philadelphia and became an assistant architect on the City Hall and, in 1857, a founding member of the American Institute of Architects (AIA).

Founder's Hall was the school's original classroom building. It has three main floors, each measuring 14,000 square feet (1,300 m^{2}). The plan for each floor, according to Stephen Girard's specifications, consists of a 100-by-20-foot (30.5 m × 6.1 m) front hall, four 50 ft. square rooms with 25 ft. ceilings arranged two by two, and a back hall the same size as the front hall. The scale of the spaces was impressively large when the building first opened.

Resulting from his association with architect Walter, Nicholas Biddle hired him in 1834 to convert the Biddle country seat, Andalusia, in Bucks County, Pennsylvania, from a large Pennsylvania farmhouse into an exemplary domestic Greek-Revival structure.

== Notable alumni ==
- John Albert Brown, president of Mobil Oil Corporation
- Kahleah Copper, basketball player
- Lawrence Cunningham, author and professor
- Eugene Daub, sculptor
- Thelma Davies, sprinter
- Harry Davis, former Major League Baseball player
- Joseph Hallman 1998, composer, musician
- Al Harker, 1934 FIFA World Cup and professional soccer player
- Richard Harris, Alaska pioneer involved in the founding of Juneau, Alaska
- George Hegamin, former National Football League player
- Russell Johnson, actor, "The Professor" on Gilligan's Island
- Franz Kline, Abstract Expressionist painter
- Johnny Lush, former Major League Baseball player
- Harry "Moose" McCormick, former Major League Baseball player
- John "Jocko" Milligan, former Major League Baseball player
- John Nolen, city planner and landscape architect
- George A. Palmer, minister and radio broadcaster
- Donald Ratajczak, economist
- William Ward, member of the US House of Representatives from Pennsylvania's 6th Congressional District
- James Hamilton Windrim, artist/architect, designed the Bank of North America
- Ashton Youboty, NFL Cornerback for the Jacksonville Jaguars
- Wesley Morris New York Times cultural critic, two-time Pulitzer Prize for Criticism winner
- Jeffery Young Jr., Fifth District representative, Philadelphia City Council
- Bob Williams, 18th and 19th district representative, Washington

== Notable faculty ==
- Bruce Carey, conductor
- Ida Craddock, writer and advocate of free speech and women's rights

== See also ==
- List of National Historic Landmarks in Philadelphia
- National Register of Historic Places listings in North Philadelphia
