= Lakeyta Bonnette-Bailey =

American academic

Lakeyta Bonnette-Bailey is a Professor of Africana Studies and Political Science at Georgia State University and the Co-Director of the Center for the Advancement of Students and Alumni (CASA). Her research interests include Hip-Hop culture, popular culture, political behavior, political attitudes, African-American politics, Black women and Politics, political psychology and public opinion.

She is the author of Pulse of the People: Political Rap Music and Black Politics (2015). She also published Black Popular Culture and Social Justice: Beyond the Culture (Routledge Press 2023) with Dr. Jonathan Gayles and For the Culture: Hip-Hop and Social Justice (University of Michigan Press, 2022) with Dr. Adolphus Belk, Jr.

== Biography ==
Lakeyta Bonnette-Bailey, born Lakeyta Monique Bonnette, received her B.A. at Winthrop University and her Ph.D. from Ohio State University, where she studied the role of rap music in African-American politics.

Her monograph Pulse of the People: Political Rap Music and Black Politics was published by University of Pennsylvania Press in 2015. The book investigates the influence of rap music on political views and attitudes among African Americans, paying particular attention to political hip hop. In 2019, she presented a TedX talk entitled "The Political Impact of Rap Music".
