= Gerald R. Weeks =

American author and lecturer

- Born: North Carolina, United States
- Occupation(s): Author, Therapist

Gerald R. Weeks is an American author and lecturer. In 2017, he became Professor Emeritus as he retired from the University of Nevada, Las Vegas.

Weeks received his PhD in Clinical Psychology. Since 1979, Weeks served in a number of professional positions, including Associate Professor of Psychology at the University of North Carolina, Program Director at the Council for Relationships, and later Clinical Associate Professor of Psychology at the University of Pennsylvania School of Medicine. He also served as President of the American Board of Family Psychology from 1988-1989.

He was a Professor and Chair of the Marriage and Family Therapy Program at the University of Nevada, Las Vegas from 1999-2013, becoming professor in 2013.

== Career ==
One of Weeks' major achievements is the development of the 'Intersystem Approach to Therapy' (see Weeks & Hof, 1994). It is a theoretical framework which combines individual, couple, and intergenerational factors in the diagnosis and treatment of individuals, couples, and families. It includes two constructs: the attachment theory construct, and the interactional construct. Early in his career, he was influential in the development of strategic therapy.

== Recognition ==
He received the American Association for Marriage and Family Therapy "Outstanding Contribution to the Field of Marriage and Family Therapy" award in 2009 and "The 2010 Family Psychologist of the Year" award from the Society for Family Psychology, which is part of the American Psychological Association.

== Publications ==
Besides his books, Weeks has published scientific journal articles and book chapters. He has also presented hundreds of scientific papers, lectures, and training workshops throughout North America, Europe, and Australia. Several of his books are widely used to train students in master's and doctoral programs in couple and family therapy.

=== Author or co-author ===
- Hertlein, K. M., Weeks, G., & Gambescia, N. (Eds.) (2019). Systemic Sex Therapy. (3rd ed.). New York: Routledge.
- Weeks, G. & Gambescia, N. (2016). A clinician's guide to systemic sex therapy. (2nd ed.). New York: Routledge
- Weeks, G, Fife, S, Peterson, C. (2016). Techniques for the couple therapist. New York: Routledge.
- Hertlein, K. M., Weeks, G., & Gambescia, N. (Eds.) (2015). Systemic Sex Therapy. (2nd ed.). New York: Routledge.
- Weeks, G. R., & Fife, S. (2014). Couples in treatment. (3rd ed.). New York: Routledge.
- Hertlein, K, Weeks, G., & Sendak, S. (2009). A clinician's guide to systemic sex therapy. New York: Routledge.
- Weeks, G, Odell, M., & Methven, S. (2005). Common mistakes in couple therapy. W. W. Norton.
- Sexton, T., Weeks, G., & Robbins, M. (2003). Handbook of family therapy. New York: Brunner/Routledge.
- Weeks, G., Gambescia, N., & Jenkins, R. (2003). Treating infidelity. New York: W.W. Norton.
- Weeks, G., & Gambescia, N. (2002). Hypoactive sexual desire: Integrating couple and sex therapy. New York: W.W. Norton.
- Weeks, G., & Gambescia, N. (2000). Erectile dysfunction: Integrating couple therapy, sex therapy and medical treatment. Dunmore, PA: W.W. Norton.
- DeMaria, R., Weeks, G., & Hof, L. (1999). Focused genograms. New York: Brunner/Mazel.
- Weeks, G. & Hof, L. (1995). Integrative solutions: Treating common problems in couples' therapy. New York: Brunner/Mazel.
- Sauber, R., L'Abate, L., Weeks, G., & Buchanan, W. (1993). Dictionary of family psychology and therapy. Newbury Park, CA: Sage.
- Weeks, G. & Treat, S. (1992). Couples in treatment. New York: Brunner Mazel. (Also translated into Italian and Chinese.); revised ed., 2001.
- Sauber, R., L'Abate, L., & Weeks, G. (1985). Family therapy: Basic concepts and terms. Rockville, MD: Aspen Systems.
- Weeks, G., & L'Abate, L. (1982). Paradoxical psychotherapy: Theory and practice with individuals, couples, and families. New York: Brunner/Mazel. (Translated into Japanese, German, Italian, Polish, Chinese, Finnish, and Turkish.) Main Selection of the Psychotherapy Book Club, 1982.

=== Editor or co-editor ===
- Weeks, G. & Hof, L., (Eds.) (1994). The marital-relationship therapy casebook: Theory and application of the intersystem model. New York: Brunner/Mazel.
- Weeks, G. (Ed.) (1989). Treating couples: The intersystem model of the Marriage Council of Philadelphia. New York: Brunner/Mazel.
- Weeks, G. & Hof, L. (Eds.) (1987). Integrating sex and marital therapy: A clinician's guide. New York: Brunner/Mazel. Main selection of Psychotherapy and Social Science Review Book Club.
- Weeks G. (Ed.) (1985). Promoting change through paradoxical therapy. Homewood, IL: Dow-Jones. Rev. ed, 1991.
