= Elias Gaucher =

Elias Gaucher was a French printer and publisher of clandestine erotica who worked out of the Malakoff and Vanves communes in the southwestern suburbs of Paris, France, about three miles from the centre of the City. He primarily reprinted or pirated the books of other publishers, but is best known today as the original publisher of Les Exploits d'une Jeune Don Juan (1905), Guillaume Apollinaire's translation of a German erotic work called Kindergeilheit. Geständnisse eines Knaben (Berlin, 1900), and Apollinaire's masterpiece Les Onze mille verges (c. 1907).

Gaucher's generally accepted period of activity was during the years immediately preceding the outbreak of World War I. However, in his Memoirs of Montparnasse, which is set in the late 1920s, the Canadian poet John Glassco tells of having a book called Contes en crinoline published by a 'monsieur Gaucher,' which raises the possibility that Gaucher was in business for longer than has been previously thought.
