= Akinyele Umoja =

American educator and author

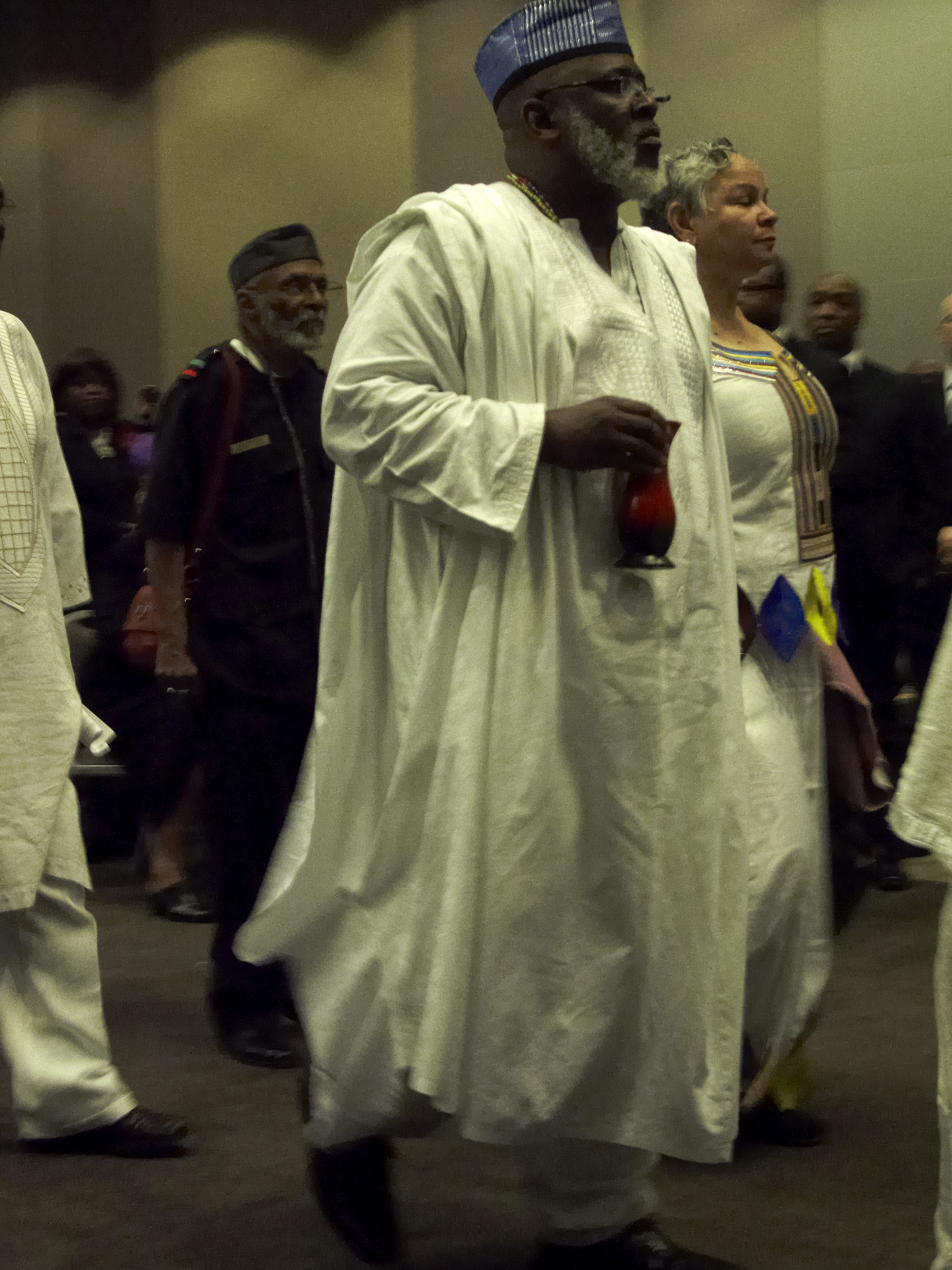
- Born: 1954 (age 71–72); Los Angeles, California
- Education: California State University, Los Angeles
- Occupations: Educator, writer, activist
- Years active: 1972–present
- Employer: Georgia State University
- Notable work: We Will Shoot Back: Armed Resistance in the Mississippi Freedom Movement
- Political party: African People's Party
- Movement: New Afrikan Independence Movement
- Website: baba-ak.com

Akinyele Umoja (born 1954) is an American educator and author who specializes in African-American studies. As an activist, he is a founding member of the New Afrikan People's Organization and the Malcolm X Grassroots Movement. In April 2013, New York University Press published Umoja's book We Will Shoot Back: Armed Resistance in the Mississippi Freedom Movement. Currently, he is a Professor and Department Chair of the Department of African-American Studies at Georgia State University (GSU).

== Early life and education ==
Akinyele Omowale Umoja was born in Los Angeles, California, in 1954, and spent much of his childhood in Compton, California. He graduated from high school in 1972. Umoja received his BA in Afro-American studies from California State University, Los Angeles, in June 1986. He earned his M.A. in August 1990 at the Institute of Liberal Arts at Emory University in Atlanta, Georgia. While a Ph.D. candidate at Emory under Robin Kelley, his dissertation topic was "Eye for an Eye: Armed Resistance in the Mississippi Freedom Movement".

== Career ==
=== Early activism in California ===
Umoja has worked with the New Afrikan Independence Movement. After beginning to attend UCLA in 1972, as a freshman, he began to write for the student newspaper NOMMO and also joined the Muhammad Ahmad (Max Stanford) Defense Committee (MADC).

When Ahmad was held on conspiracy charges, Umoja organized petitions and fundraisers to secure Ahmad's release. He dropped out of UCLA, also joining the African People's Party and the House of Umoja. Two years later, he was a founding member of the Malcolm X Grassroots Movement and the New Afrikan People's Organization. Umoja has since represented both organizations nationally and in international forums in the Caribbean, Africa, and Europe.

From 1972 until 1982, Umoja was on the staff of Soulbook: The Revolutionary Journal of the Black World, founded by Mamadou Lumumba. He was also very active in activism in Los Angeles during this time, where he organized security and assistance for several of Malcolm X’s associates. He was also active with the Coalition Against Police Abuse (CAPA) in Los Angeles.

In 1979, Umoja was in a committee of the National Black Human Rights Coalition, which produced a document “detailing the Black liberation movement’s demand for self-determination, reparations and a call to release political prisoners.” It was presented to the Secretary General of the United Nations at that time, who was Salim Salim of Tanzania.

=== Career in education ===
Umoja has varied experiences as an educator. He has taught in secondary schools, alternative schools, and colleges and universities, as well as developed African-centered curriculum for public schools and community-education programs. In the late 1980s, he taught social studies in Atlanta's public schools, where he also taught African-American history from 1986 until 1991 at the Atlanta Metropolitan College. In the early 1990s, he began teaching in the history department of Clark Atlanta University, where he lectured until 1996. He then became a professor at the Department of African American Studies at Georgia State University (GSU), and is also department chair.

=== Writing and recent appearances ===
Umoja's writing has been featured in scholarly publications as The Journal of Black Studies, New Political Science, The International Journal of Africana Studies, Black Scholar, Radical History Review and Socialism and Democracy. Umoja was one of the contributors to the Blackwell Companion on African American History, The Black Panther Party Reconsidered, Liberation, Imagination, and the Black Panther Party (edited by Kathleen Cleaver, and Malcolm X: A Historical Reader.

In April 2013, New York University Press published Umoja's first single-authored book, We Will Shoot Back: Armed Resistance in the Mississippi Freedom Movement. A review in The Clarion-Ledger in 2015 described the book as following "confrontations in communities across the state through the end of the 1970s, demonstrating how black Mississippians were ultimately able to overcome intimidation by mainstream society, defeat legal segregation, and claim a measure of political control of their state." He was honored for the book in 2014 in Oakland.

Umoja has been a contributor to commercial and popular documentaries on black history. Umoja was a featured commentator on the American Gangster episode "Dr. Mutulu Shakur", which aired on November 8, 2008. He appeared in Bastards of the Party (2006) and Freedom Archives’ Cointelpro 101 (2010).

In recent years, he supported movements in Guyana and Haiti, and, in August 2010, he led a Black August delegation of the Malcolm X Grassroots Movement to Haiti to investigate conditions after a recent earthquake. In 2013, he lectured in Mississippi on the 1965 boycott by black citizens. In 2014, he offered tribute to his late friend, Chokwe Lumumba, at the mayor's funeral in Jackson, Mississippi.

== Awards and recognition ==
He earned the Patricia Harris Fellowship from 1990 until 1993, and, in 1994, he was named in Who’s Who in America’s Teachers. In 1995, he was an honorary member of the National Golden Key Honor Society.

== Publications ==
- We Will Shoot Back: Armed Resistance in the Mississippi Freedom Movement

== Film appearances ==
- 2008: American Gangster episode "Dr. Mutulu Shakur" — featured commentator
- 2006: Bastards of the Party, directed by Cle "Bone" Sloan
- 2010: Cointelpro 101 by Freedom Archives

== See also ==
- List of Georgia State University people
