= Donald Ratajczak =

American economist

Donald Ratajczak (born 1942 or 1943) is an American economist specializing in economic forecasting. He is Emeritus Regents' Professor in the Andrew Young School of Policy Studies at Georgia State University.

== Early life and education ==
Ratajczak was born in Philadelphia, where he was educated at Girard College after his father died when he was six years old. He earned a bachelor's degree from Haverford College and a PhD in economics from MIT in 1972, with a dissertation titled "An examination of the impact of World War II upon economic development in the United States".

== Career ==
Ratajczak began his academic career at UCLA, where he was a faculty member and research director of the economic forecasting project. From 1973 until his retirement in 2000, he was on the economics faculty of Georgia State University, and was founder director of the Economic Forecasting Center within the J. Mack Robinson College of Business. He is now an Emeritus Regents' Professor. While at Georgia State he wrote a regular column for the Atlanta Journal-Constitution and also consulted as an economic forecaster and investment consultant, in particular with M. Irby & Co. and following that company's dissolution, from 1975 until 2009 with Morgan Keegan & Company, of which he was also a board member, and its successor Raymond James Financial.

In 2000 he founded venture capital company Brainworks Ventures, Inc., in Atlanta; it merged with AssuranceAmerica in April 2003, after which he remained on the board of the combined company. He has also served on the boards of First Citizens BancShares, Crown Crafts, and Ruby Tuesday among others.

By 1988 Ratajczak had become known as an excellent predictor of the Consumer Price Index. In November 1994 the Economic Forecasting Center at Georgia State received the Blue Chip award for the most accurate national economic forecasts over four years. In December 1996 Business Week recognized him as the most accurate forecaster in its survey of predictions for the preceding year. USA Today ranked him second in accuracy in 2006 and fourth in 2007 out of 45 economists consulted. The Wall Street Journal has called him one of the world's 20 most-quoted economists.

== Personal life ==
Ratajczak is married to Rosalinda Reynolds, also an economist and a teacher; they have two children.
