= Malika Redmond =

American activist

Malika Redmond is an American activist and nonprofit organization director for women and girls. Her writing and activism predominantly focuses on reproductive justice, especially pertaining to women of color, as well as civic engagement, women's rights, leadership development for Black youth and women, and racial justice. She is currently the co-founder and chief executive officer of Women Engaged, an American non-profit that advances women's human rights, youth empowerment, and civic engagement efforts in Georgia. Women Engaged provides leadership development opportunities, public policy advocacy, community-building initiatives, and year-round non-partisan voter engagement campaigns to various counties in Georgia. The organization was created in 2014 by Redmond and Margaret Kargbo.

== Early life and education ==
Redmond grew up in Pittsburgh, Pennsylvania. Her grandparents participated in the Great Migration from the south and settled in Pittsburgh.

Redmond founded the International Black Youth Summit at age 14. She earned a Bachelor of Arts in Women's Studies at Spelman College in 2002 and a Masters of Arts in Women's Studies from Georgia State University.

== Career ==
During the 2020 election and Senate runoff race in Georgia, Redmond successfully led Women Engaged's efforts to register thousands of voters. Women Engaged was one of many organizations that contributed to the historic voter turnout that shifted the traditionally red state of Georgia blue.

Redmond previously worked for Political Research Associates, Choice USA, National Center for Human Rights Education, and was on the Board of the National Women's Health Network. Redmond is also the emeritus board chair of the ProGeorgia Civic Engagement Table.
