= Xiaochun He =

Nuclear physicist

- Education: Northwestern University of Xian; University of Tennessee
- Scientific career
- Fields: High-energy nuclear physics
- Institutions: Georgia State University
- Thesis: Multiplicity dependence of Bose-Einstein correlation and quantum statistics (1991)
- Doctoral advisor: Chia-Chang Shih

Xiaochun He is a high-energy nuclear physicist and Regent's Professor at Georgia State University. He is also a member of the PHENIX Collaboration, a research group at Brookhaven National Laboratory's Relativistic Heavy Ion Collider.
