= Angela Doyinsola Aina =

American public health practitioner

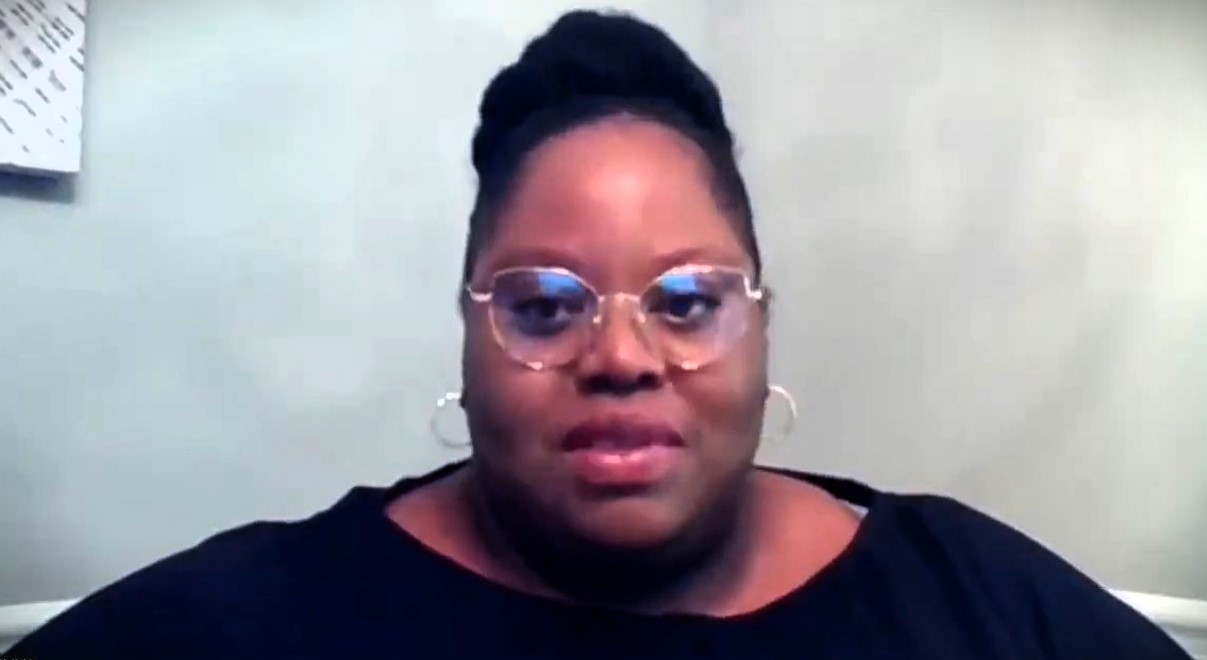
- Aina in 2020
- Education: Georgia State University (BS); Morehouse School of Medicine (MPH)
- Occupation: Public health practitioner
- Known for: Co-founder of Black Mamas Matter Alliance (BMMA)

Angela Doyinsola Aina is an American public health practitioner and the co-founder and executive director of the Black Mamas Matter Alliance, an organization which focuses on improving maternal and reproductive health outcomes for Black women.

== Early life and education ==
Aina earned her Bachelor of Science in Psychology and African-American Studies from Georgia State University in 2005. She earned her Master of Public Health from the Morehouse School of Medicine in 2011.

== Career and advocacy ==
Proclamation of Black Maternal Health Week

Aina began her career as a public health practitioner and has worked both at the community level and in academic settings, as well as at both state and federal government levels. Aina recalls these early experiences in her career and how "she would often find herself in predominantly white spaces", witnessing a disconnect "like something is always wrong with Black women or African women".

Aina was a Public Health Prevention Service Fellow for the Centers for Disease Control and Prevention (CDC) for over five years, working on the impacts of the Zika on pregnancy. She also supported the CDC's response to the 2014 outbreak of Ebola in Western Africa.

In 2016, Aina helped to co-found the Black Mamas Matter Alliance (BMMA) with Elizabeth Dawes Gay, drawing upon a partnership between the Center for Reproductive Rights and the SisterSong Women of Color Reproductive Justice Collective. Both Aina and Gay point to the CDC's statistics on Black maternal mortality in the United States that say white women die from pregnancy-related causes at a quarter of the rate Black women do. The BMMA has been successful in pushing for legislation to assist African-American women in childbirth, including the Preventing Maternal Deaths Act of 2018. Aina cites the importance of the data this act collects: "Because if we don't know how and why women are dying, we're not able to address these systems-level issues".

In 2018, BMMA launched Black Maternal Health Week as an initiative to draw attention to the health crisis facing Black mothers. In 2021, the Biden-Harris administration officially recognized the initiative. In 2020, Aina was recognized by Time magazine for her work in addressing discrepancies in maternal health care. Aina expressed her hope that "increased attention will help lead to more investment in black women–led health programs". Aina and the BMMA have supported the Black Maternal Health Caucus as well as the Momnibus Act of 2023.

In September 2020, Aina was named the executive director of the BMMA.

== Awards and honors ==
- In March 2020, Aina was recognized as a 2020 WebMD Health Hero.
