= Eric Gaucher =

American biologist (born 1972)

- Education: University of Florida
- Scientific career
- Fields: Evolutionary Synthetic Biology
- Workplaces: Georgia State University

Eric Alexander Gaucher (born January 1972) is an American biologist best known for his work in computational molecular evolution.

== Early life and education ==
Gaucher was guided in biochemistry by Peter Tipton and Bayesian Theory by George Smith. Gaucher subsequently earned his Ph.D. from the University of Florida under the tutelage of Steve Benner and Michael Miyamoto. Gaucher received the Walter M. Fitch Award from the Society for Molecular Biology and Evolution for his graduate work. He then did postdoctoral work with NASA's Astrobiology Institute in conjunction with a National Research Council Fellowship. After the two-year fellowship, Gaucher served as President of the Foundation for Applied Molecular Evolution.

== Career ==
Gaucher was hired as an Associate Professor by the Georgia Institute of Technology in 2008 before moving to Georgia State University where he is currently a professor. The Gaucher group conducts basic and applied research at the interface of molecular evolution and biology. As of February 2016, his h-index, as calculated by Google Scholar, is 25.

Gaucher is also the founder and president of the early-stage biotechnology company General Genomics. His company exploits novel platforms to engineer proteins for the biomedical and industrial sectors.

== Selected publications ==
- Eric A. Gaucher, J. Michael Thomson, Michelle F. Burgan, Steven A. Benner (2003). Inferring the palaeoenvironment of ancient bacteria on the basis of resurrected proteins. Nature 425: 285–88

Georgia State biology chair removed minutes before meeting
