= National Register of Historic Places listings in Kenosha County, Wisconsin =

Location of Kenosha County in Wisconsin

This is a list of the National Register of Historic Places listings in Kenosha County, Wisconsin.

This is intended to be a complete list of the properties and districts on the National Register of Historic Places in Kenosha County, Wisconsin, United States. Latitude and longitude coordinates are provided for many National Register properties and districts; these locations may be seen together in a map.

There are 29 properties and districts listed on the National Register in the county. Another two properties were once listed but have been removed. All but four of these are located inside the county seat, Kenosha, Wisconsin.

This National Park Service list is complete through NPS recent listings posted May 1, 2026.

== Current listings ==
	Name on the Register	Image	Date listed	Location	City or town	Description
1	Barden Store	Barden Store	November 12, 2020 (#100005752)	622-628 58th St. 42°35′00″N 87°49′09″W	Kenosha	2-story brick building with a glass and aluminum storefront and projecting canopy, designed by Charles O. Augustine and built in 1907 to house Hugh E. Barden's store - "Kenosha's premier locally-owned department store." Barden managed until his death in 1927. Henry C. Hyslop managed from 1934 to 1967. Barden's store continued operation until 1985.
2	Barnes Creek Site		July 20, 1977 (#77000032)	Address Restricted	Kenosha	Prehistoric site occupied from Paleo-Indian to historic times. The remains of at least 5 adults have been found at the site with copper items including a tubular bead and an awl, all stained with red ochre. A slate gorget was found apart from the burials, and various points and ceramic fragments.
3	Boys and Girls Library	Boys and Girls Library	October 24, 1980 (#80000144)	5810 8th Avenue; 42°34′57″N 87°49′14″W	Kenosha	Neogothic-style Unitarian church built in 1907. Bought by the city in 1926 to become a children's library, then reclaimed as a Unitarian church in 1993.
4	Chesrow Site	Chesrow Site	November 30, 1978 (#78000109)	Western side of Highway 32, 2 miles (3.2 km) north of the Illinois line 42°31′16″N 87°49′27″W	Kenosha	Site on a beach of Glacial Lake Chicago where ancient people heated chert cobbles to produce projectile points.
5	Civic Center Historic District	Civic Center Historic District	July 26, 1989 (#89000069)	Roughly bounded by 55th Street, 8th Avenue, 58th Street, and 10th Avenue; 42°35′04″N 87°49′19″W	Kenosha	Group of six Neoclassical-styled public buildings around Civic Center Park.
6	Anthony and Caroline Isermann House	Anthony and Caroline Isermann House	February 25, 2004 (#04000108)	6416 Seventh Avenue; 42°34′33″N 87°49′08″W	Kenosha	1922 2-story Prairie Style house designed by Russell Barr Williamson. Anthony and his brother ran a clothing business.
7	Frank and Jane Isermann House	Frank and Jane Isermann House	February 25, 2004 (#04000107)	6500 Seventh Avenue; 42°34′33″N 87°49′08″W	Kenosha	1923 2-story Prairie Style house designed by Russell Barr Williamson.
8	Kemper Hall	Kemper Hall	June 7, 1976 (#76000067)	6501 Third Avenue; 42°34′35″N 87°48′50″W	Kenosha	Episcopal college complex started from Charles Durkee's 1861 Italianate-styled mansion and gradually expanded with various Gothic Revival additions.
9	Kenosha County Courthouse and Jail	Kenosha County Courthouse and Jail	March 9, 1982 (#82000677)	912 56th Street; 42°35′06″N 87°49′23″W	Kenosha	Neoclassical-styled courthouse built 1923 to 1925.
10	Kenosha Elks Club	Kenosha Elks Club	November 13, 2017 (#100001815)	5706 8th Ave. 42°35′01″N 87°49′15″W	Kenosha	4-story Georgian Revival brick Elks' meeting hall designed by R. Messmer and built 1917 to 1919.
11	Kenosha Light Station	Kenosha Light Station	June 28, 1990 (#90000995)	5117 Fourth Avenue; 42°35′23″N 87°48′57″W	Kenosha	Lighthouse and keeper's house built in 1866 on Simmons Island, north of the channel into Kenosha's harbor.
12	Kenosha North Pierhead Light	Kenosha North Pierhead Light	June 24, 2008 (#08000545)	North pier at Kenosha harbor entry, 0.1 mile east of Simmons Island Park; 42°35′20″N 87°48′31″W	Kenosha	50-foot lighthouse with cast iron walls, situated on the far end of the pier that guards the entrance to Kenosha's harbor.
13	Library Park	Library Park	June 22, 2000 (#00000733)	711 59th Place; 42°34′50″N 87°49′11″W	Kenosha	Set aside in 1838 to be a town common, the public area has evolved into a city park "romantically" landscaped by Ossian Cole Simonds and containing a library and war memorial designed by Daniel Burnham.
14	Library Park Historic District	Library Park Historic District	November 29, 1988 (#88002657)	Roughly bounded by 59th Street, 7th Avenue, 61st Street, and 8th Avenue; 42°34′50″N 87°49′09″W	Kenosha	Historic neighborhood surrounding Library Park, containing 42 contributing homes built from 1843 to 1930 in a variety of styles.
15	Lucas Site		February 24, 1995 (#95000136)	Address Restricted	Pleasant Prairie	Another archeological site on what was the plain of Glacial Lake Chicago, which has produced heat-treated points, chipped stone, and bone fragments similar to Chesrow. Occupation could have been from 4000 to 12400 BP.
16	Manor House	Manor House	October 29, 1980 (#80000145)	6536 Third Avenue; 42°34′28″N 87°48′55″W	Kenosha	2.5-story brick mansion with ballroom, servants' quarters, and formal garden, designed by Pond and Pond and built in 1926 for James E. Wilson, an executive of Nash Motors. Later the residence of the headmasters of Kemper Hall.
17	John McCaffary House	John McCaffary House	January 31, 1978 (#78000110)	5732 13th Court; 42°34′56″N 87°49′35″W	Kenosha	2-story cream brick house built in 1842. There in 1850 John MacCaffary drowned his wife Bridget in a backyard cistern. The following year he was convicted of murder. His botched hanging gave the final push toward abolition of the death penalty in Wisconsin.
18	Rosinco	Rosinco	July 18, 2001 (#01000737)	12 miles (19 km) east of Kenosha; 42°37′30″N 87°38′14″W	Lake Michigan	95-foot steel diesel-powered yacht built in 1916 by Harlan and Hollingsworth of Wilmington, Delaware. Sank in 1928 after hitting something in the middle of the night 12 miles east of Kenosha. Now sits 195 feet below the surface.
19	John P. and Mary Runkel House		March 3, 2020 (#100005013)	33301 Geneva Rd. 42°34′47″N 88°12′48″W	Wheatland	Cream brick-clad Italianate-style house with bay window and denticulated, bracketed cornice, built in 1878.
20	St. Matthew's Episcopal Church	St. Matthew's Episcopal Church	June 6, 1979 (#79000090)	5900 7th Avenue; 42°34′55″N 87°49′08″W	Kenosha	Episcopal church designed by A.H. Ellwood in English Gothic Revival style and completed in 1879. Oldest surviving church in Kenosha.
21	Simmons Island Beach House	Simmons Island Beach House	February 20, 2003 (#03000057)	5001 Simmons Island; 42°35′27″N 87°48′51″W	Kenosha	Tudor Revival structure designed by Chris Borggren, with limestone veneer and half-timbering. Built 1934-35 with help from the FERA and WPA - New Deal agencies.
22	Gilbert M. Simmons Memorial Library	Gilbert M. Simmons Memorial Library	December 17, 1974 (#74000093)	711 59th Place; 42°34′50″N 87°49′10″W	Kenosha	Fine Classical Revival-styled library with dome designed by Daniel Burnham and completed in 1900. Financed by Zalmon G. Simmons in memory of his son Gilbert.
23	Southport Beach House	Southport Beach House	January 8, 2003 (#02001684)	7825 First Avenue; 42°33′41″N 87°48′45″W	Kenosha	Public dressing rooms and ballroom along Lake Michigan, designed by Christian Borggren in an unusual assortment of styles and constructed in the late 1930s using reclaimed materials and WPA assistance.
24	Third Avenue Historic District	Third Avenue Historic District	November 1, 1988 (#88002022)	Along Third Avenue between 61st and 66th Streets; 42°34′35″N 87°48′52″W	Kenosha	Kenosha's "mansion" district of the early 20th century, with large, stylish homes facing Kemper Hall and Lake Michigan.
25	Vincent-McCall Company Building	Vincent-McCall Company Building	March 26, 2018 (#100002235)	2122 56th St. 42°35′01″N 87°50′06″W	Kenosha	Factory that manufactured metal springs, started by the Windsor Spring Company in 1900. Later the Vincent-McCall Company expanded the factory and the product line to include mattresses, metal lawn furniture, and steel berths and bunks during WWII.
26	Washington Park Clubhouse	Washington Park Clubhouse	January 23, 2003 (#02001740)	2205 Washington Road; 42°36′04″N 87°50′11″W	Kenosha	Tudor Revival-styled clubhouse for a public golf course, designed by Hugo Bothe and completed in 1936 with WPA assistance, built partly with reclaimed materials.
27	Justin Weed House	Justin Weed House	December 3, 1974 (#74000094)	3509 Washington Road; 42°36′09″N 87°51′07″W	Kenosha	Greek Revival-styled house built by David Warren in 1848, with exterior walls carefully veneered with cobblestones laid in stripes and with brick quoins on the corners.
28	Wehmhoff Mound (47KN15)	Wehmhoff Mound (47KN15)	November 21, 1985 (#85002971)	Along old Highway 83 in the northwestern quarter of Section 26, Township 2 North, Range 19 East; 42°36′22″N 88°13′30″W	Wheatland	Lone effigy of a water spirit. The curvature of the tail is unusual in effigy mounds. Photographed from a plane in 1927, it was only the second known instance of aerial photography for archaeological purposes in the U.S.
29	WISCONSIN shipwreck (iron steamer)	WISCONSIN shipwreck (iron steamer)	October 7, 2009 (#09000820)	6.5 miles (10.5 km) south-southeast of Kenosha; 42°31′58″N 87°42′31″W	Kenosha	204-foot iron package steamer built in 1881 - the first iron craft on the Great Lakes with a double bottom. Served as a hospital ship in WWI. Sank in a storm in October 1929.

== Former listings ==
	Name on the Register	Image	Date listed	Date removed	Location	City or town	Description
1	Alford Park Warehouse		December 31, 2002 (#02001665)	April 21, 2014	1885 Sheridan Road; 42°37′19″N 87°49′34″W	Kenosha	Rustic-styled brick warehouse/gymnasium designed by Hugo Bothe and built in 1938. Destroyed in a 2012 fire.
2	Kenosha High School		June 6, 1979 (#79003770)	August 21, 1980	913 57th Street; 42°35′00″N 87°49′21″W	Kenosha	Monumental school building designed in Richardsonian Romanesque style by F.S. Allen and built in 1890. Demolished in 1980.

== See also ==
- List of National Historic Landmarks in Wisconsin
- National Register of Historic Places listings in Wisconsin
- Listings in neighboring counties: Lake (IL), McHenry (IL), Racine, Walworth
