= VMC =

VMC may refer to:

== Education ==
- Van Mildert College, Durham, a constituent college of Durham University, England
- Vincent Massey Collegiate (Montreal), a high school in Montreal, Quebec, Canada
- Government Vellore Medical College, a medical college in Adukkamparai, Vellore, Tamil Nadu, India

== Organisations ==
- Valencian Media Corporation, a Spanish media company
- Vellore Municipal Corporation, the civic body that governs the city of Vellore, Tamil Nadu, India
- Veraval Municipal Council, the civic body that governs the city of Veraval, Gujarat, India
- Vijayawada Municipal Corporation, the civic body that governs the city of Vijayawada, Andhra Pradesh, India
- Virgin Mobile Canada, a mobile brand wholly owned by Bell Mobility in Canada
- Vruwink MotorCycles, a Sidecarcross frame manufacturer
- Vulcan Materials Company, a producer of construction materials

== Technology ==
- Variational Monte Carlo, an algorithm for approximating the ground state of a quantum system
- Vista Media Center, the Windows Media Center included with Windows Vista
- Visual Monitoring Camera, a camera launched aboard Mars Express, a spacecraft in orbit of Mars

== Transportation ==
- V_{MC}, the minimum control speed(s) of a multi-engine aircraft
- Visual meteorological conditions, an aviation flight category in which visual flight rules flight is permitted
- Vaughan Metropolitan Centre station, a Toronto Transit Commission subway station, Canada
- Vevey–Montreux–Chillon–Villeneuve tramway, a former tramway in the Swiss canton of Vaud
- Vicinity Motor Corp., now Raeda Dynamics, a Canadian bus and truck manufacturer

== Other ==
- Vaughan Metropolitan Centre, a central business district in Vaughan, Ontario
- Vincent-McCall Company Building, now the VMC Lofts, a historical site in Kenosha, Wisconsin
- Vasomotor center, a portion of the medulla oblongata that regulates blood pressure and other homeostatic processes
- Virtual Museum of Canada, Canada's national virtual museum
- My Little Pony: A Very Minty Christmas, a direct-to-DVD animated film
