= Zalmon Gilbert Simmons II =

American businessman (1870–1934)

Zalmon G. Simmons II
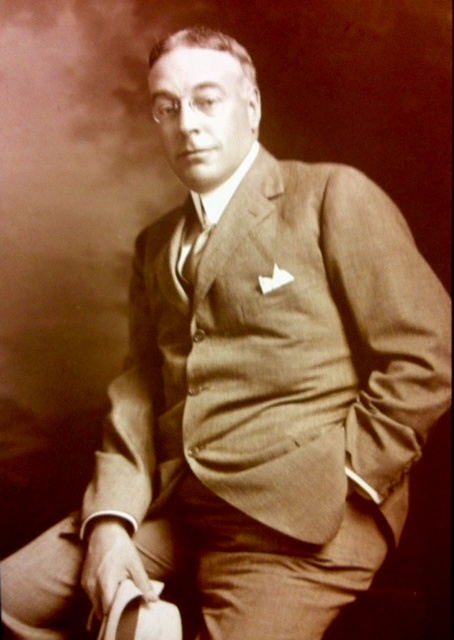
- Born: November 2, 1870; Kenosha, Wisconsin, U.S.
- Died: April 26, 1934 (aged 63)
- Known for: president of the Simmons Company; namesake of Simmons Island park in Kenosha, Wisconsin
- Father: Zalmon G. Simmons

Zalmon Gilbert Simmons II (November 2, 1870 – April 26, 1934) was an American businessman who was the president of The Simmons Company from 1910 to 1932. He inherited the company in 1910 from his father, Simmons Company founder Zalmon G. Simmons. Z.G. II was commonly referred to as "the Chief" for his ability to recognize possibilities and make decisions that many felt were foolish but would prove to be extremely profitable. It is reported that Simmons once wagered an automobile a hole in a game of golf. His unshakable character increased the company's profits from less than $5,000,000, when he became president, to over $40,000,000 at the peak of his incumbency and revolutionized the bedding industry.

== Personal life ==
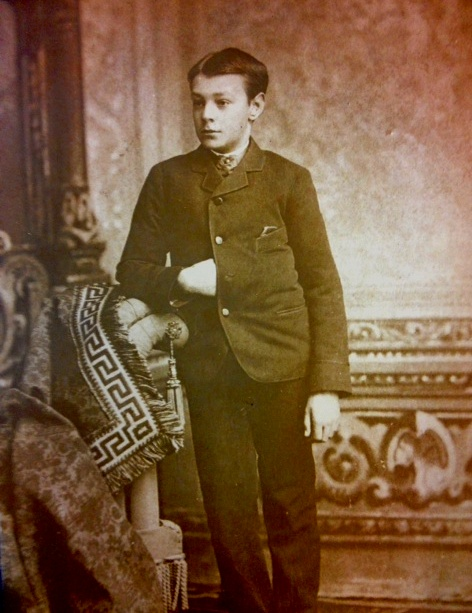
Zalmon Gilbert Simmons II, child

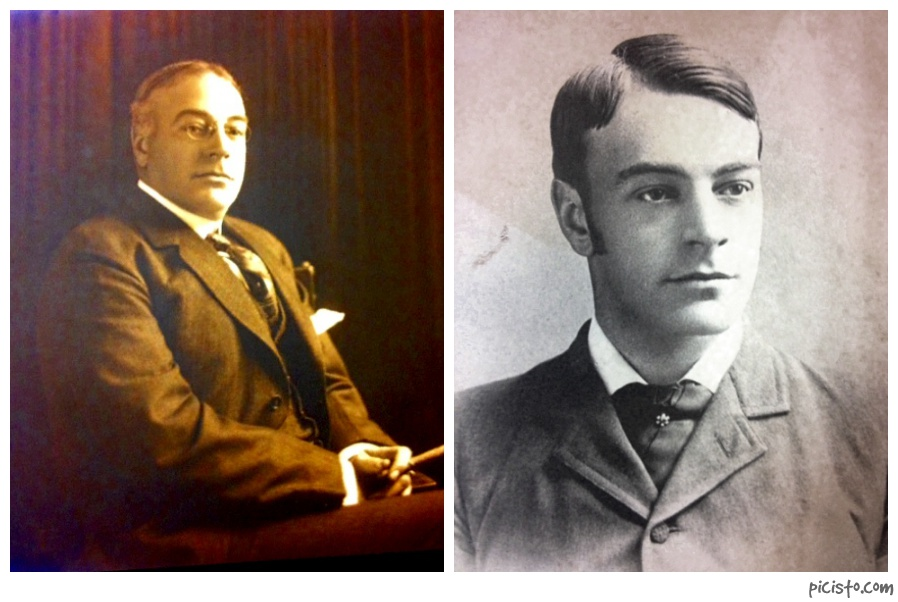
Zalmon Gilbert Simmons II

Zalmon Gilbert Simmons II was born on November 2, 1870, to Zalmon Gilbert Simmons and Emma E. Robeson in Kenosha, Wisconsin. He was youngest of six children and family's only surviving son. As a boy Zalmon attended Manlius Military School in Manlius, NY. In 1891 the school became St. John's Military School. While in attendance he excelled in academics and baseball. His love of baseball would continue throughout his life; a 7 he developed one the country's best industrial baseball teams at his Kenosha, Wisconsin plant with an initial investment of $300,000.

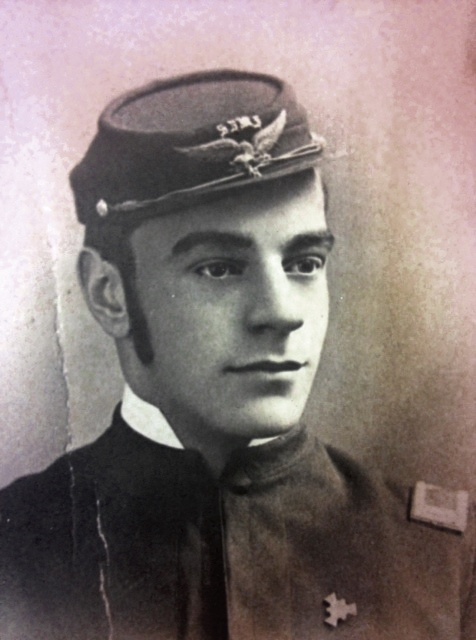
Zalmon G. Simmons II, Manilus Military School

After returning home from military school Zalmon married Francis Ethridge Grant, the daughter of a Wisconsin lumberman, on September 6, 1892. Over the next four years the couple had two surviving children. Grant Gilbert Simmons was born on December 25, 1893, followed by his brother Zalmon Gilbert Simmons Jr. on March 12, 1898.

=== Life in Greenwich, Connecticut ===
In 1923 Zalmon and Francis moved their family to an "exquisite" manor in Greenwich, Connecticut. The Simmons estate was said to be the equivalent of many of the châteaux in France and stately homes in Europe. The interior was designed by the world-renowned Elsie de Wolfe.

"It featured hand-painted chinoiserie wallpaper, black marble floors with inlaid copper, and a study paneled with pine that had been stripped from a venerable mansion in London. The main house had six maid's rooms. Outbuildings included a stable for horses, two greenhouses, a six-car garage, and a guest-house with its own courtyard; as well, Simmons built a pair of two-family cottages to house the butler, the chauffeur, the head gardener, and the estate superintendent. For their two sons, Zalmon junior and Grant, Zalmon and Francis built two more houses on the estate. "

While living in Greenwich Z.G. II became involved with the Hotchkiss School in Lakeville where his sons were enrolled. He was a large supporter of the school and donated $125,00 to the institution.

In 1932 Z.G. II became chairman of the board and his oldest son Grant took over as president of The Simmons Company. This gave "the Chief" an opportunity to enjoy retirement at his 164-acre estate in Greenwich, Connecticut. In the years before his death Z.G. II had become a passionate horticulturist. In the season before his death he planted on 3,000,000 iris bulbs throughout the gardens of the massive property.

In early April 1934 Zalmon was hospitalized at Johns Hopkins Hospital in Baltimore, Maryland where he underwent major surgery for an intestinal ailment. He remained hospitalized for two weeks before his death on April 26. His wife Francis and two sons Grant and Zalmon Jr. were at his side at the time of his passing.

After the death of Zalmon G. Simmons II the family's Greenwich estate was sold off in pieces. In 1938 George Skakel purchased the main house along with ten acres of land. Skakel, founder of the Great Lakes Carbon Corporation paid Francis Simmons $160,000 for the property ($2 million today). The self-made millionaire purchased the property for his wife, Ann Brannack, and their seven children. In 1950 Skakel's daughter Ethel married Robert F. Kennedy at St. Mary Catholic Church. Following the wedding the family held a reception at the estate for over 2,000 people, including John F. Kennedy who was the best man. The former Simmons estate was location of the social event of the year.

== Simmons Company ==
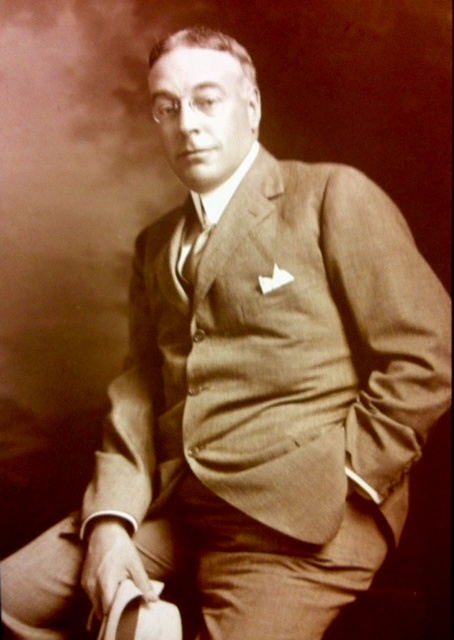
Zalmon G. Simmon II, The Chief

=== Evolution of the Company ===
The Simmons Manufacturing Company was known from its inception for woven wire mattress springs, cradles, metal beds and wooden folding chairs. In 1916 Zalmon II looked to expand the company nationally. The Simmons Company purchased the Rudger-Merle Company in San Francisco followed by a plant in Los Angeles. In 1918 the company purchased of the largest bedding company in the east, New Jersey's Newark Spring Mattress Company. This acquisition extended the company's product lines from cradles, metal beds and woven wire bed springs into the padded bedding and mattress industry. Z.G. II's desire to revolutionize the company would eventually lead to a mass-produced pocketed coil innerspring mattress known as the Beautyrest. The success of this new business venture led to the purchase of Atlanta, Georgia mattress maker Hirsch and Spitz and a Seattle plant in 1919. With the company's new acquisitions, Simmons Manufacturing Company was officially in the mattress business. Z.G. Simmons II, known by now as "the Chief", continued to find ways to improve and expand. Z. G II innovated a nationwide service station program. Through this system retailers were given samples of Simmons products for the consumer to view. When the customer placed an order it was delivered within 24 hours from one of Simmons warehouses. These company advancements led to the decision to move his family and his company offices east in 1923. He relocated the Simmons Company headquarters to 280 Park Avenue in New York City. This same year The Simmons Company stock was listed on the New York Stock Exchange.

=== Beautyrest Mattress ===
When Zalmon G. Simmons II took over the company after his father's death in 1910 he continued the tradition of innovation set by his predecessor. The greatest example came in 1925 with the introduction of the Beautyrest mattress. This new mass-produced innerspring mattress was made of individual cloth pocketed coils that contoured to the body and led to a new world of sleep comfort. While the younger Simmons did not invent the pocketed coil innerspring mattress he facilitated a way to mass-produce it.

In 1901, a planning mill operator in Canada named James Marshall patented the first innerspring mattress with individual cloth pocketed coils. He produced the inner-springs with a machine that hand cranked a single coil that was then sewn into a cloth pocket. The process was repeated multiple times to create one mattress. Since the Marshall inner-springs were made by hand they were very expensive, appearing only in few lavish hotels and on luxury ships such as the Titanic and the Lusitania. When Marshall's patent expired in 1917 the mattress was still unknown to the majority of the general public. Z.G. Simmons II knew the Marshall innerspring was a quality mattress but the price kept it from being a profitable product. In 1922 he charged a top Simmons engineer named John Franklin Gail with the task of inventing a machine that could mass-produce pocketed coil inner-springs. Gail was sent to Evanston, Illinois, away from the distractions of the Kenosha plant, with instructions to work on no other project until it was completed. After three years of dedication Gail finally returned to "the Chief" with the "Beautyrest Pocket Machine", a piece of machinery that revolutionized the bedding manufacturing industry. The release of this new mattress, that brought comfort to the Everyman, not only changed the manufacturing industry but also the sales and marketing industries.

Zalmon II used his company's new creation to set retail pricing, something that was unheard of at the time. He was also able to sell it for three to four times the price of other padded bedding because of his belief in educating the masses on the importance of good sleep combined with faith in effective marketing and advertisement. In its first year of production the Beautyrest sold 16,168 units with effective marketing campaigns sales drastically increased to 464,214 by 1929.

=== Marketing and advertising ===
In 1925 Z.G. Simmons II made the decision to set the retail price for the new mattress at $39.50. This was unheard of at the time for two reasons. At $39.50 this was three to four times the cost of the solid pad mattress that were commonly sold, there was also an objection to a manufacturer setting the price. Despite the countless objections to the plan, "the Chief" refused to back down. Simmons's resilience proved to be a great asset for the company. He believed that despite the obstacles, with a great marketing campaign and the ability to stress the importance of good sleep his mass-produced innerspring mattress would be a great asset to The Simmons Company. The company had a contest for its employees to name the new mattress. When all votes were in the name Beautyrest won just barely over "Sleep Comfort" and "Slumber Well". On September 19, 1925, The Saturday Evening Post ran the first full-page advertisement for the new Beautyrest mattress with its innerspring pocket coils and a headline that read, "Give Your Tired Brains and Body This Chance to Renew Their Energy Every Night". The following year the first announcement of the "Simmons Fellowship of Sleep" at the Mellon Institute was published in The Ladies Home Journal. It questioned the importance of sleep and announced, "Realizing the importance of sleep to mankind, The Simmons Company began to throw what light it could on the subject more than ten years ago. But the available facts were inadequate. More must be known. " After this first wave of announcements, Simmons ran a series of advertisements from 1928 to 1929 in The Saturday Evening Post that featured celebrities such as H. G. Wells, Thomas Edison, George Bernard Shaw and Henry Ford. While they did not directly mention the Beautyrest name, the image of national heroes endorsing the importance sleep in relation to achieving health and success next to a picture of the Beautyrest mattress was an instant draw. Sales of the Beautyrest mattress jumped from 16,168 units in 1925 to 464,214 in 1929. As the popularity increased so did the clout of the celebrities in the promotions. Admiral Byrd announced in a radio communication from the Antarctic that, "Beautyrest gave our crew perfect slumber". After Will Rogers underwent a surgical procedure he sent a wire stating that "THERE SHOULD BE A LAW THAT NO PERSON IS ALLOWED TO BE OPERATED ON WITHOUT HAVING A SIMMONS MATTRESS TO RECUPERATE ON". Eleanor Roosevelt even committed to a series of weekly radio commercials for Beautyrest. Simmons and Beautyrest became synonymous with sleep.

== Study of sleep ==
The creation of the Beautyrest mattress ushered in a new era for The Simmons Company. Zalmon was no longer just selling mattresses but the complete experience of sleep. From 1924 to 1932 The Simmons Company with a grant from the Mellon Institute of Industrial Research created the first sleep research program with the goal of perfecting the art of sleep. The first sleep study observed the nocturnal habits of twelve young men for several months. Simmons facility at the Mellon Institute in Oakland, Pennsylvania consisted of an eight bedroom suite where researchers could measure different variables during the sleep trials. Including:

- Brain Waves
- Heart Rate
- Respiration Rate
- Muscle Tension
- Body Temperature
- Body Movement

The study found that: "People do not sleep like logs; they move and turn from twenty-two to forty-five times a night to rest one set of muscles and then another. " These new findings led to a new kind of advertising. Instead of simply selling a product the Simmons Company was now selling an experience. The company hired the Charles Daniel Frey Company advertising agency to head up the new campaign. Frey created many influential ad lines that, along with the new revolutionized mattress, sold sleep to a new generation. Some of Charles Daniel Frey's most memorable ad lines include:

- "Loss of Sleep cost Napoleon his empire."
- "Don't trifle with success; let sleep rebuild your energy."
- "What rest equals this--to sleep--and not to know it?"
- "Doug Fairbanks says most people are only half awake."
- "Eight hours or more in bed yet you starve for sleep."
- "When you lie awake, think of the secret of sound sleep."
- "Do you buy your bedding as intelligently as your clothes?"

All of the ad lines not only encouraged consumers to desire a better sleep experience but also complimented the Simmons motto: Built for Sleep.

== Business expansion ==
He increased the number of facilities from a single manufacturing plant in Kenosha, Wisconsin to a total of twelve manufacturing plants: six in the United States, five in Canada and a plant in Monterey, Mexico by 1925. They were also able to increase the number of domestic and international distribution warehouses. In addition to the sixty-seven domestic distribution centers the company also owned warehouses in:

The increase in facilities worldwide coupled with the release of the Beautyrest mattress created monumental gains for The Simmons Company. In 1917 the company's total sales were $14,848,998.23 by 1925 sales grew to $32,684,279.30.
