= Southport Beach House =

- U.S. National Register of Historic Places
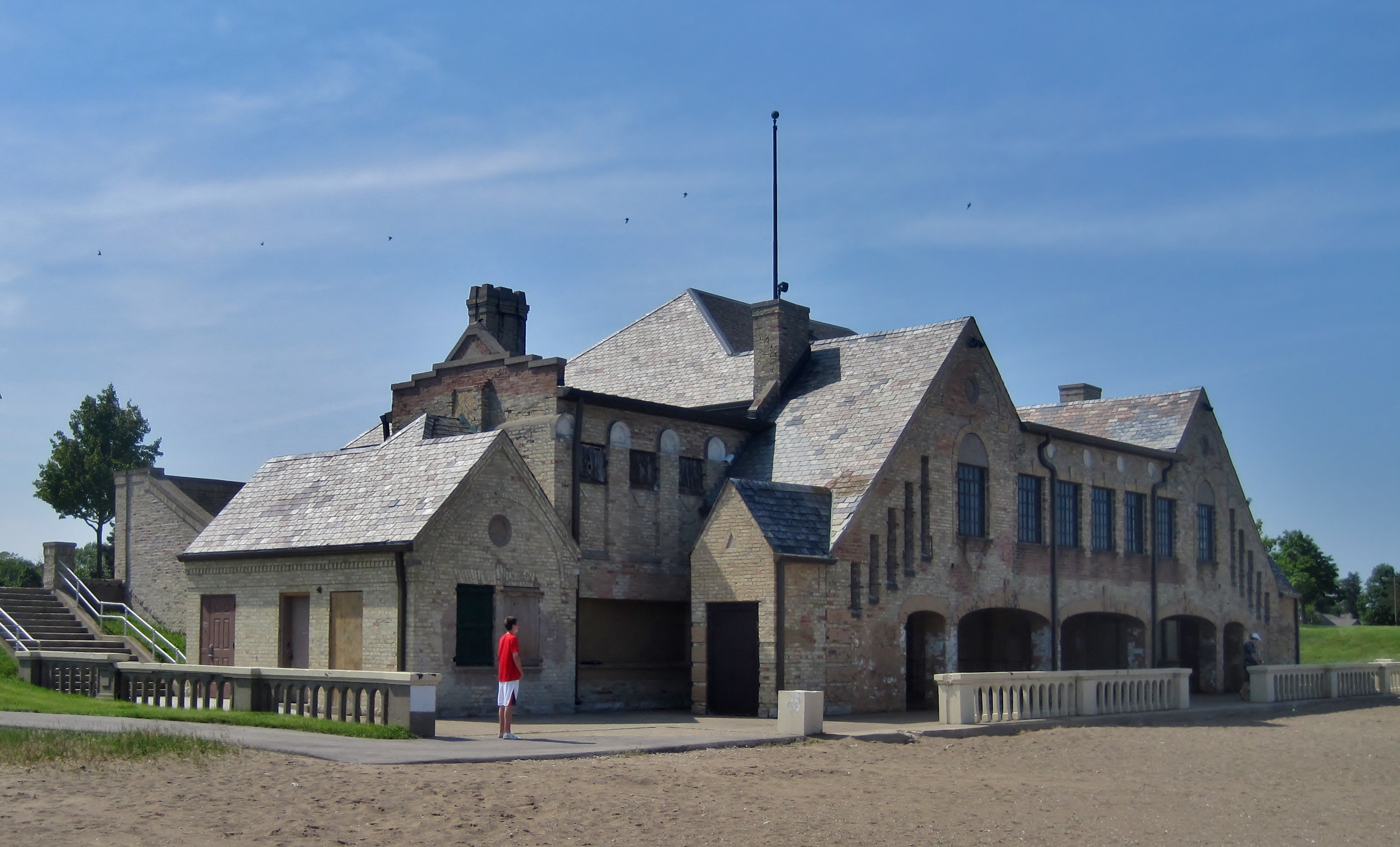

- Location within Wisconsin Location within the United States
- Location: 7825 First Ave. Kenosha, Wisconsin
- Coordinates: 42°33′41″N 87°48′45″W
- Architect: Christian Borggren
- Architectural style: Art Deco/Classical Revival
- NRHP reference No.: 02001684
- Added to NRHP: January 8, 2003

The Southport Beach House is a historic public building completed in 1940 at Southport Park on Lake Michigan in Kenosha, Wisconsin. It was added to the National Register of Historic Places in 2003.

== History ==
Kenosha had aimed to develop an extensive park and beach system ever since the Kenosha Park Association formed in 1906. By 1922, most of the land that would become part of the Kenosha parks system had been donated by wealthy residents. However, outside of Library Park, this land was largely undeveloped until the Great Depression of the 1930s, when many of Kenosha's industrial workers found themselves without work. One of the New Deal programs, the Works Progress Administration, offered funds for municipalities seeking to develop public park projects. Kenosha successfully received grants for re-purposing building materials from condemned buildings into park structures, and employed over 1000 workmen in the project.

The use of re-purposed materials caused the resulting beach house to enjoy a mix of contemporary architectural styles and revivals. The exterior blends Tudor Revival details with an overarching Mediterranean Revival theme. Marble and stone from an old post office was used to create an Art Deco ballroom, featuring the geometric ornamentation common to the style. The Southport Beach House remains open to the public for events, although it no longer functions a beach house. On January 8, 2003, the building was recognized by the National Park Service with a listing on the National Register of Historic Places. It was damaged in the June 2012 North American derecho, casting doubt on its long-term viability.

== See also ==
- Simmons Island Beach House: also in Kenosha
- National Register of Historic Places listings in Kenosha County, Wisconsin
