= Kemper Hall =

- U.S. National Register of Historic Places
- U.S. Historic district – Contributing property
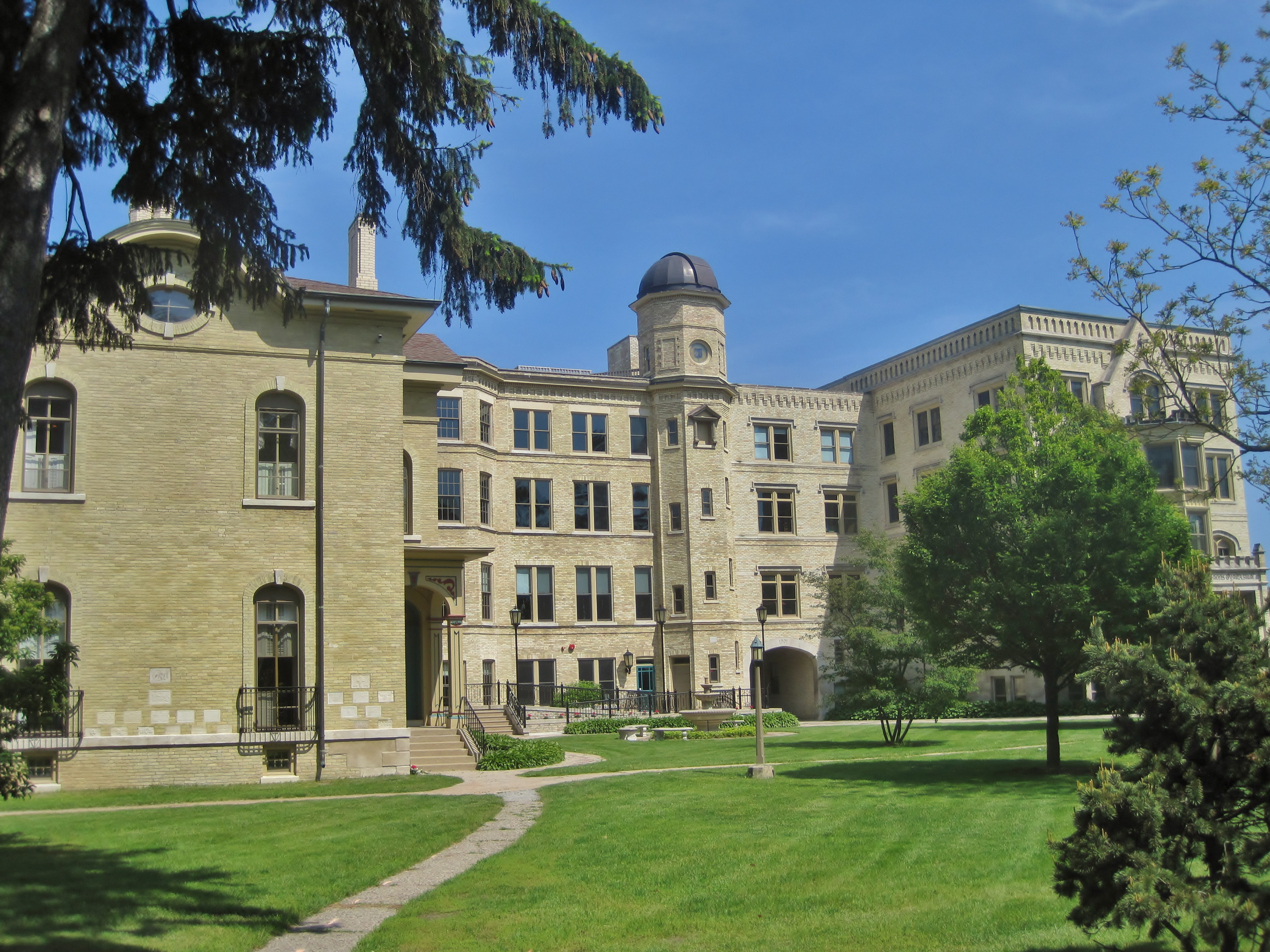

- Location within Wisconsin Location within the United States
- Location: 6501 3rd Ave., Kenosha, Wisconsin
- Coordinates: 42°34′35″N 87°48′50″W
- Area: 7 acres (2.8 ha)
- Built: 1861
- Architectural style: Gothic, Italianate
- Part of: Third Avenue Historic District (ID88002022)
- NRHP reference No.: 76000067
- Added to NRHP: June 7, 1976

Kemper Hall is placed on a Kenosha County park with 17.5 acres in Kenosha, Wisconsin, United States. Kemper Hall overlooks Lake Michigan with a historic chapel, observatory, the Anderson Arts Center, and the Durkee Mansion.

Kemper Hall began with an Italianate mansion and was expanded with various wings and buildings in Gothic Revival style. It previously housed a complex Episcopal all girls’ boarding school after the expansion. It was added to the National Register of Historic Places in 1976.

== History ==
Kemper Hall was originally known as Durkee Mansion, the estate of early Kenosha, Wisconsin settler Charles Durkee. The mansion was built in 1861 as Durkee was completing his one term in the United States Senate. In 1865, Senator Durkee's home was donated to the St. Matthew's Episcopal Church, who aimed to convert the house into an all girls' boarding school. The all girls' school was opened in 1871 and renamed Kemper Hall in honor of Jackson Kemper, the first missionary bishop of the Episcopal Church of the United States. In 1878, the Episcopal Sisters of St. Mary came into the leadership of Kemper Hall and became known as the Mother House of the Western Province.

In 1875, the church built the Kemper Chapel north of Kemper Hall, in a simple Gothic Revival style common among Anglican churches. A year later, the first graduating class held its ceremony there. A four-story dormitory was built to the south of this complex in 1894 and extended in 1901. In 1893, the Griffin Observatory was added to the south wing of the school. Additionally, the Study Hall and Chemistry Lab were added to the complex with the Chemistry Lab being the first lab for women in Wisconsin. A Gothic Revival dormitory and the Gilbert Simmons gymnasium was added in 1901. The Durkee mansion was linked to the church in 1908 with the construction of the cloister music house. Three years later, a convent was built to the north, linked to the chapel with a nun's residence, known as Ambrose Hall.

Kemper Hall surrounded their learning with athletic competition, self-discipline, and prayer. Classes were encompassed with critical thinking and problem-solving. The school motto: "Fight the Good Fight" was taught with grounds in intellectual, spiritual, and physical force to right the wrongs the girls encountered.

Kemper Hall served in this role for 105 years. Kemper Hall announced that it was going to close in late 1974 as they were no longer able to staff and maintain the complex. The school accepted its last student as a mid-year transfer in early 1975 and held its last year-end ceremony at the end of spring semester, of 1975. The school was never particularly large, graduating only 1600 students in its history. After the school closed, a preservation-minded coalition raised money, bought the enormous structure, and gave it to Kenosha County, which is known as the Kemper Center.

On June 7, 1976, the building complex was honored by the National Park Service with a listing on the National Register of Historic Places. In 1988, Kemper Hall was listed as a contributing property to the Third Avenue Historic District. Today, the complex operates as a 501(c)(3) nonprofit organization, including, a conference and special events center with programs, and various types of classes offered.
