= John McCaffary House =

Historic house in Kenosha, Wisconsin, United States

- U.S. National Register of Historic Places
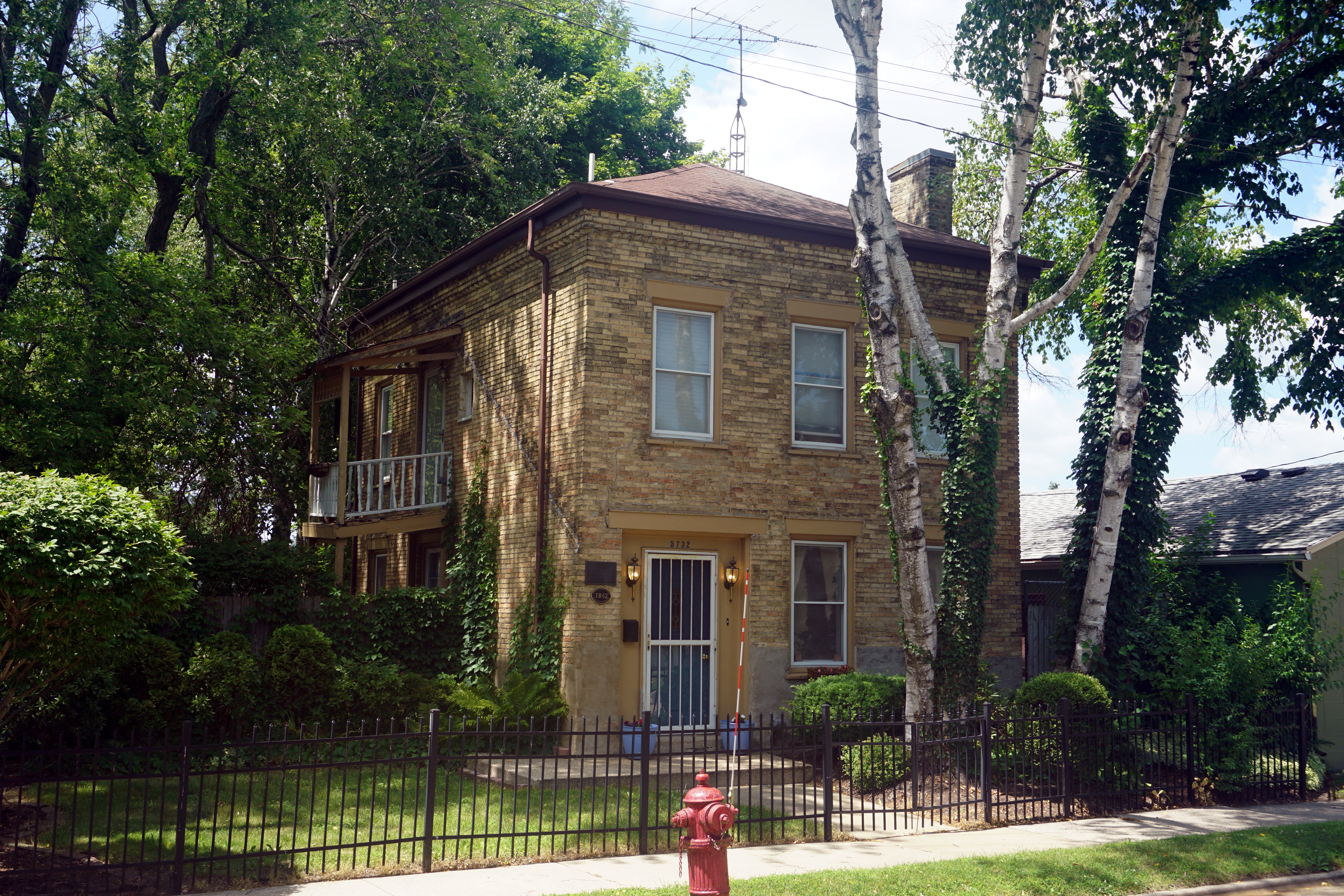
- John McCaffary House

- Location within Wisconsin Location within the United States
- Location: 5732 13th Court; Kenosha, Wisconsin
- Coordinates: 42°34′56″N 87°49′35″W
- Built: 1842
- NRHP reference No.: 78000110
- Added to NRHP: January 31, 1978

The John McCaffary House is located in Kenosha, Wisconsin, United States. It was built in 1842 and was the site of the murder of Bridget McCaffary by her husband, John McCaffary. He was the first and only person executed by the State of Wisconsin before it abolished the death penalty in 1853. The house was added to the National Register of Historic Places (NRHP) in 1978.

== History ==
The John McCaffary House was built in 1842 in what was, at the time, the outskirts of Kenosha. It is a two-story house with three rooms on each floor. It was constructed with cream-colored bricks and features a three-window facade, a low hip roof, and a simple cornice featuring a sawtooth pattern.

=== Bridget McCaffary murder and aftermath ===
On July 23, 1850, John McCaffary murdered his wife Bridget by drowning her in the cistern behind the house. The couple had been married less than two years at the time and their marriage was reportedly tumultuous, with neighbors reporting domestic disturbances (broken dishes and furniture) and shouting at the house prior to the murder. The Kenosha Telegraph reported that the cistern itself "was but the diameter of a hogshead, and the water was but 20 in (51 cm) deep."

Both before and during a brief trial in May 1851, John McCaffary maintained his innocence. On May 23, a jury found him guilty and sentenced him to death in accordance with the mandatory death penalty that existed in Wisconsin at the time.

On August 21, 1851, McCaffary admitted to the murder on the scaffold, and was then executed publicly by hanging in front of a crowd of 2,000–3,000 people. His neck did not immediately break, and he struggled violently for eight minutes and ultimately lived for almost 20 minutes before he was pronounced dead on the scaffold.

The execution strengthened the growing movement against capital punishment in Wisconsin, which had been prominent since the territorial period in what became Wisconsin as well as other former portions of the Northwest Territory. However, prior to statehood in 1848, the Wisconsin Territory had executed four people. The leader of the local and state opposition to the death penalty was Kenosha Telegraph newspaperman, and future politician and inventor of the typewriter, Christopher Latham Sholes. The day after McCaffary's execution, Sholes wrote in the Telegraph: "We hope that this will be the last execution that shall ever disgrace the mercy-expecting citizens of the State of Wisconsin." He elaborated: "We do not complain that the law has been enforced. We complain that the law exists."

Later in 1851, Sholes was elected to the Wisconsin State Assembly. Waukesha County farmer Marvin H. Bovee, who would soon join Sholes in the legislature, was of similar mind and in favor of a national ban on the death penalty. Both Bovee and Sholes were instrumental in Wisconsin's abolition of capital punishment.

McCaffary was both the first and last person executed by the State of Wisconsin before the state abolished the death penalty in 1853. On July 12, 1853, after Chapter 103, Laws of 1853, State of Wisconsin was passed by both houses of the Wisconsin legislature, Governor Leonard J. Farwell signed it and officially abolished capital punishment in the state.

=== Later history ===
In the 1930s, the John McCaffary House was converted into a two-unit apartment. An exterior staircase leads to the upstairs apartment. In the 1970s, before receiving historic recognition, the house was "run-down almost to the point of facing condemnation by the city."

In 1976, the Wisconsin Historical Society (WHS) petitioned for the John McCaffary House to be added to the National Register of Historic Places (NRHP). In its nomination, WHS gave two primary arguments for listing the house: "First, the case of John McCaffary contributed measurably to the final drive for abolition, and second, the site of the murder is the only place associated with the event which remains substantially as it was at that time...Therefore, the site symbolizes for contemporary Wisconsinites the abolition of capital punishment." On the NRHP nomination form, three areas of significance for the property were claimed: historic archeology (due to the remains of the cistern behind the house), law, and social/humanitarian. The house was added to the NRHP on January 31, 1978.
