= Library Park Historic District (Kenosha, Wisconsin) =

Historic district in Wisconsin, United States

- U.S. National Register of Historic Places
- U.S. Historic district
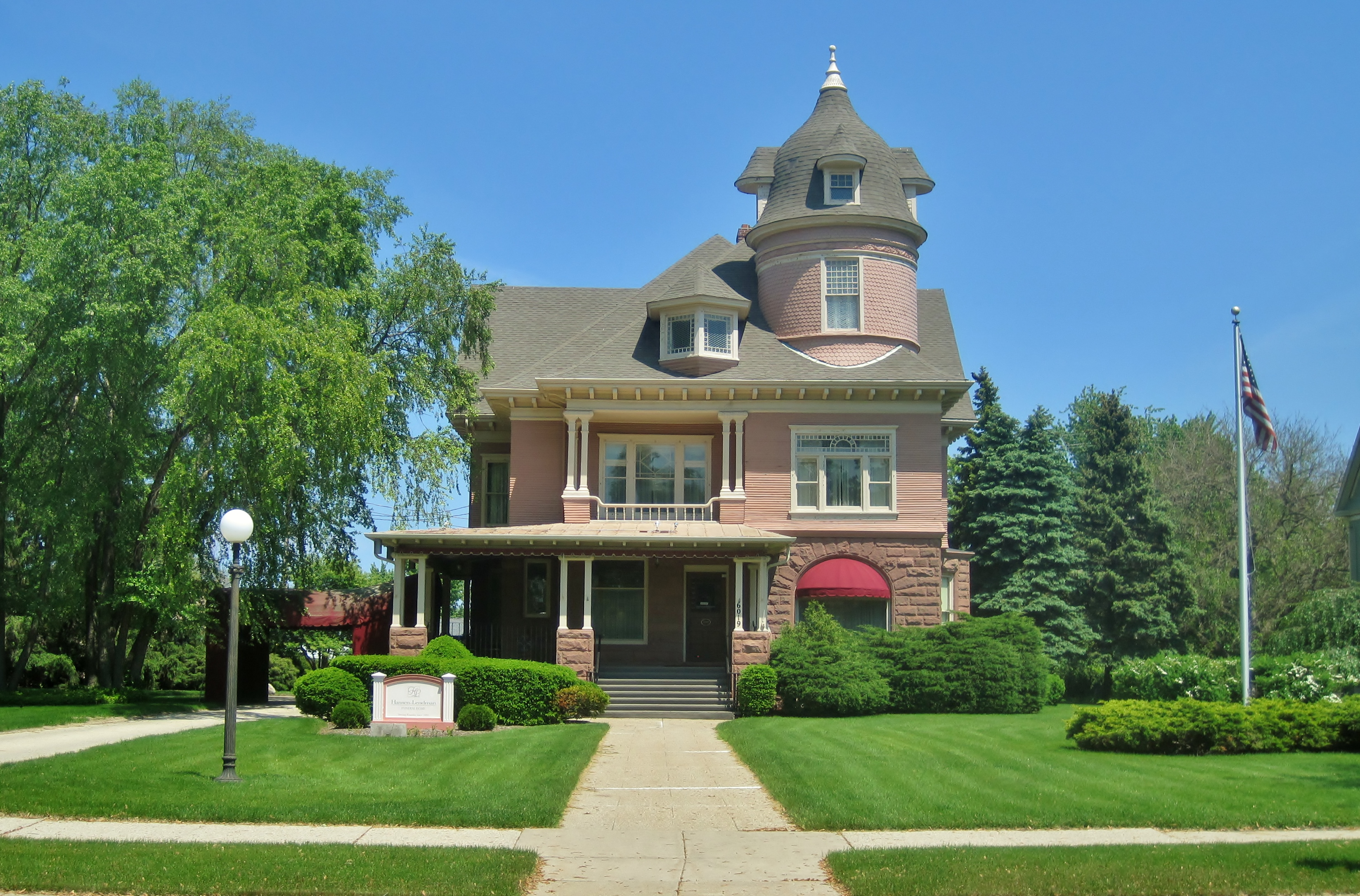
- The Urban J. Lewis House (1892)

- Location within Wisconsin Location within the United States
- Interactive map showing Library Park Historic District
- Location: Roughly bounded by 59th St., 7th Ave., 61st St., and 8th Ave., Kenosha, Wisconsin
- Coordinates: 42°34′50″N 87°49′9″W
- Area: 17 acres (6.9 ha)
- Architect: Daniel Burnham, Charles H. Walcott
- Architectural style: Italianate, Gothic Revival, Classical Revival
- NRHP reference No.: 88002657
- Added to NRHP: November 29, 1988

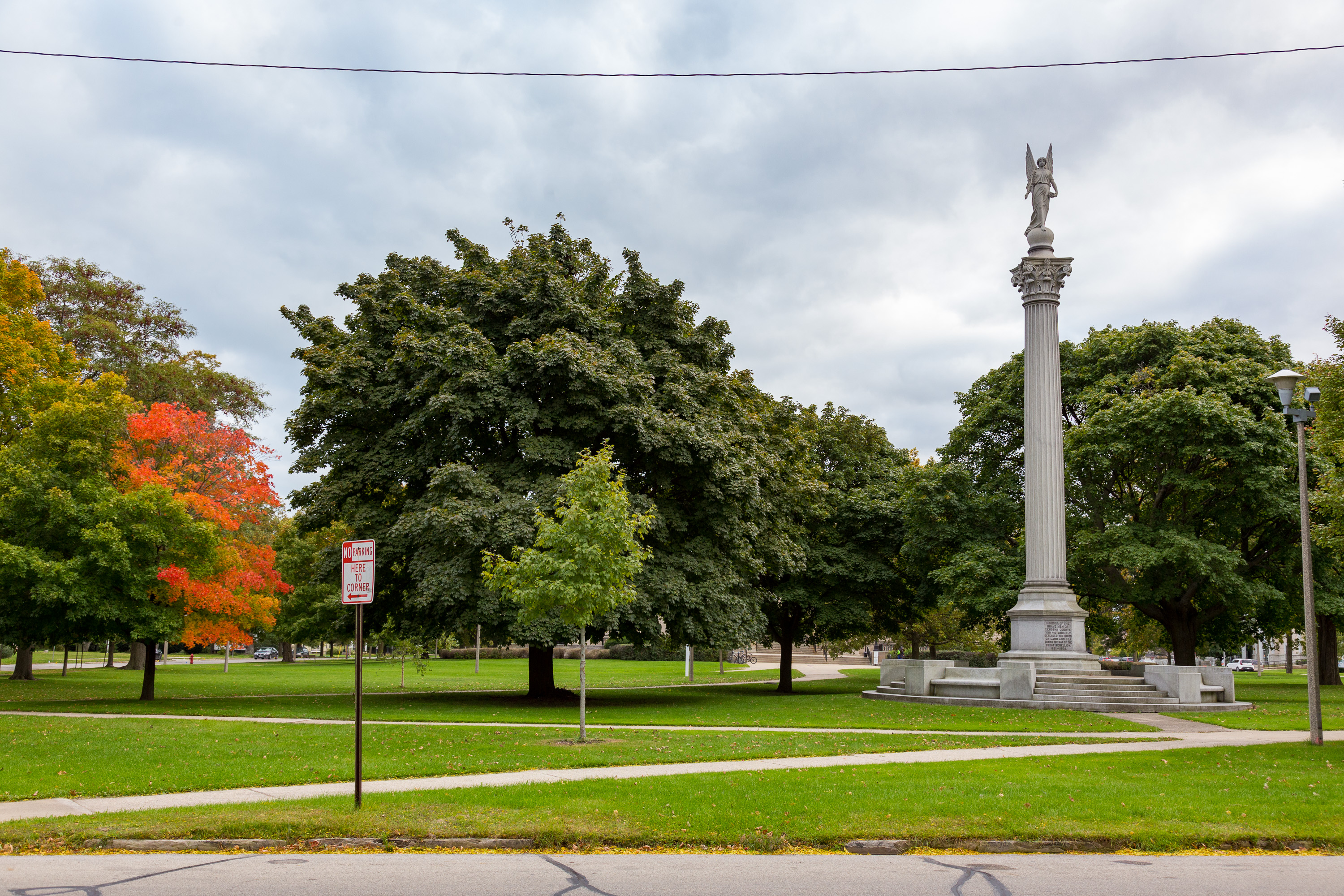
Civil War Memorial in Library Park

The Library Park Historic District is a historic neighborhood in Kenosha, Wisconsin, United States, surrounding Library Park, which was originally conceived as a New England–style town commons. The district consists of 42 contributing properties built from 1843 to 1930. The district was added to the National Register of Historic Places in 1988.

== History ==
Kenosha, Wisconsin, was first settled in 1835. Charles Durkee and George Kimball were two of the earliest settlers and laid claim to neighboring tracts of land. Durkee and Kimball agreed to donate a portion of their lands to Kenosha for a city park. The park attracted other settlers; by the mid-1840s, Volney French and Lucien Scribner had constructed their homes overlooking the park. By 1861, the lots surrounding the park were almost completely occupied. Many of these houses were demolished for the sake of redevelopment in subsequent decades, but the French and Scribner houses survived.

During the Civil War, the neighborhood became active as a stop on the Underground Railroad at the behest of Ruben H. Deming. Located at 1116-18 61st, Kenosha WI, both the Hale–Farr and the Reuben H. Deming house have survived as examples of homes used for the slave escape network. Slaves would stay at the houses until they could board ships at the Kenosha harbor.

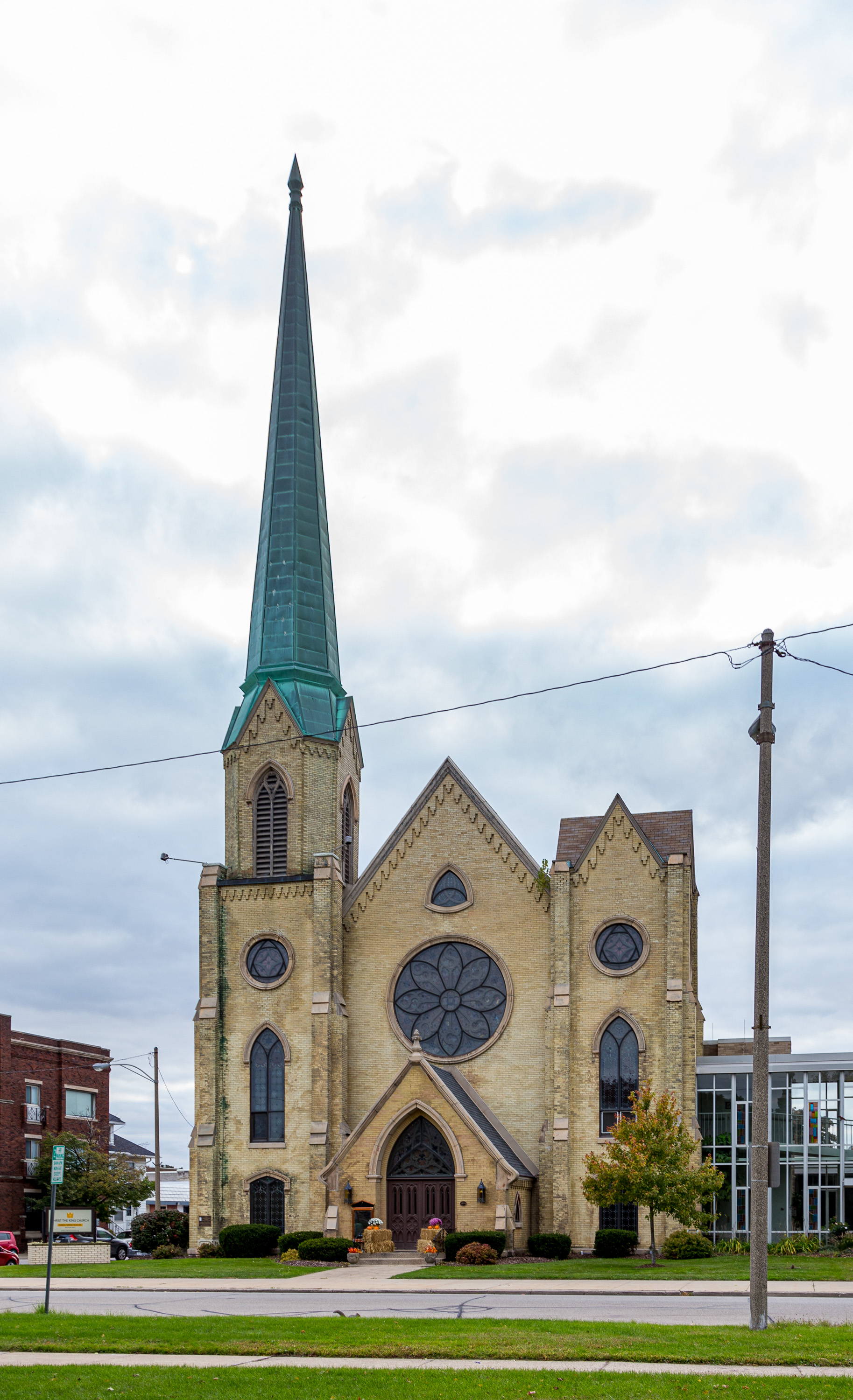
Christ The King Church, formerly First Congregational Church (1874)

Two prominent ecclesiastical buildings were constructed in the 1870s: the First Congregational Church in 1874 and St. Matthew's Episcopal Church in 1879. The Queen Anne style dominated 1890s development. Examples include the Nathan R. Allen, Jr. House and the Urban J. Lewis House. The Gilbert M. Simmons Memorial Library, designed by Daniel Burnham, opened to the public in 1900. It was built in the center of City Park, which was subsequently referred to as Library Park.

Kenosha grew steadily in the 1900s, forcing new developments in the neighborhood to be built on smaller lots, including the gabled ell Charles Stuart House (1907) and Craftsman C. Ernest Dewey House (1910). Orson Welles was born in an 1880 house at 6116 Seventh Avenue on May 6, 1915. The Neoclassical design of the library inspired the design of other public and club buildings in the district, including the Masonic Temple (1924) and the YMCA building (1930). The district saw little development since World War II. On November 29, 1988, the district was recognized by the National Park Service with a listing on the National Register of Historic Places.
