= Kenosha Light Station =

Kenosha (Southport) Light Station
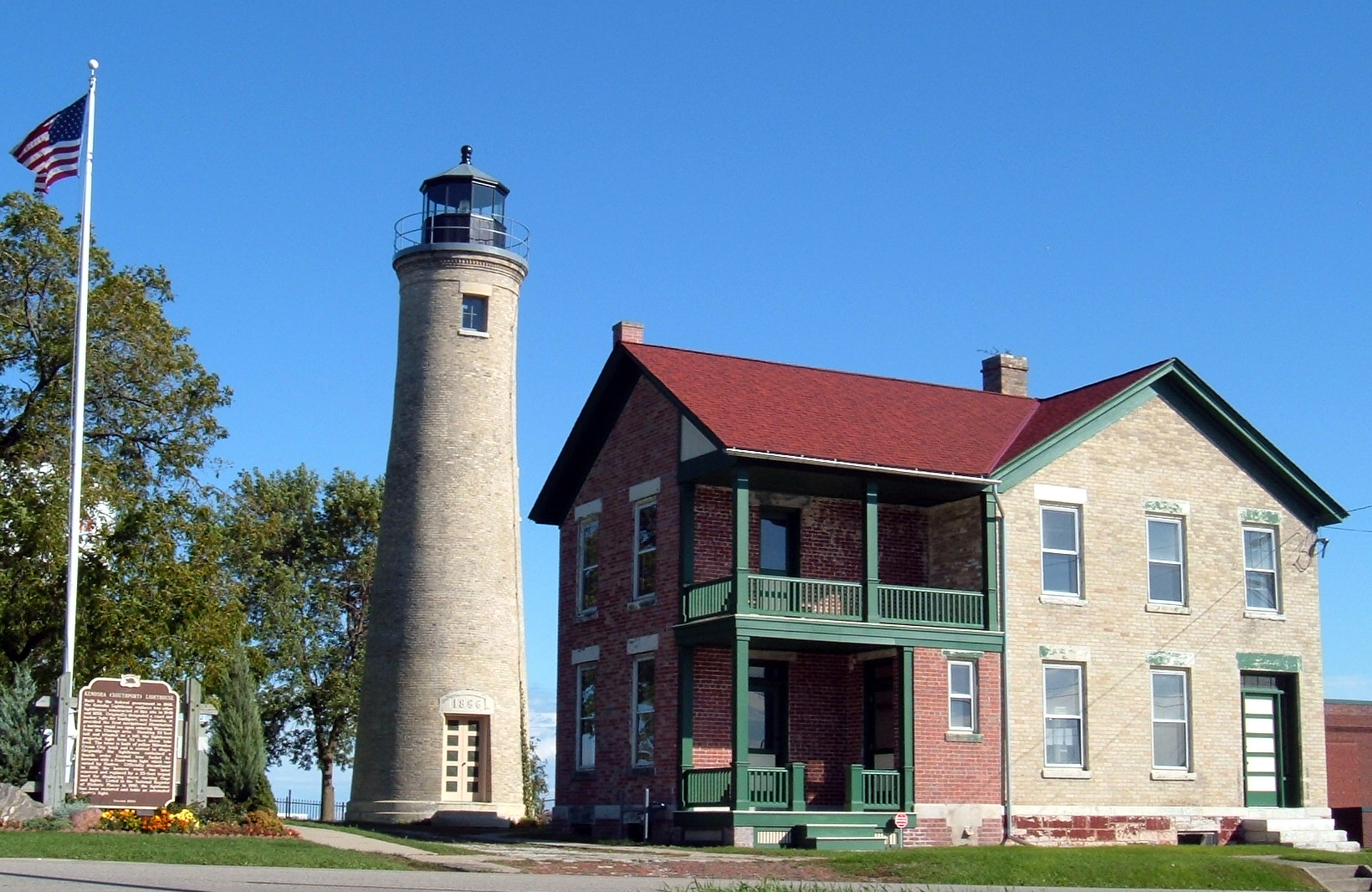
- Location: Simmons Island, Kenosha, Wisconsin
- Coordinates: 42°35′22″N 87°48′57″W

Tower
- Constructed: 1866
- Foundation: Stone
- Construction: Milwaukee "Cream City brick" w/Mortar coat
- Automated: 1996
- Height: 55 feet (17 m)
- Shape: Conical
- Markings: natural, green lantern
- Heritage: National Register of Historic Places listed place

Light
- First lit: 1866
- Deactivated: 1906-1996
- Focal height: 76 feet (23 m)
- Lens: Fourth order Fresnel lens (original), 12 in (300 mm) Tideland Signal ML-300 acrylic plastic lens (current)
- Kenosha Light Station
- U.S. National Register of Historic Places
- Location: 5117 Fourth Ave., Kenosha, Wisconsin
- Area: less than one acre
- Architectural style: Greek Revival
- NRHP reference No.: 90000995
- Added to NRHP: June 28, 1990

Kenosha Light Station (also called Southport Light Station) is a lighthouse and keeper's house on Simmons Island north of the channel into Kenosha's harbor in Kenosha County, Wisconsin.

== History ==
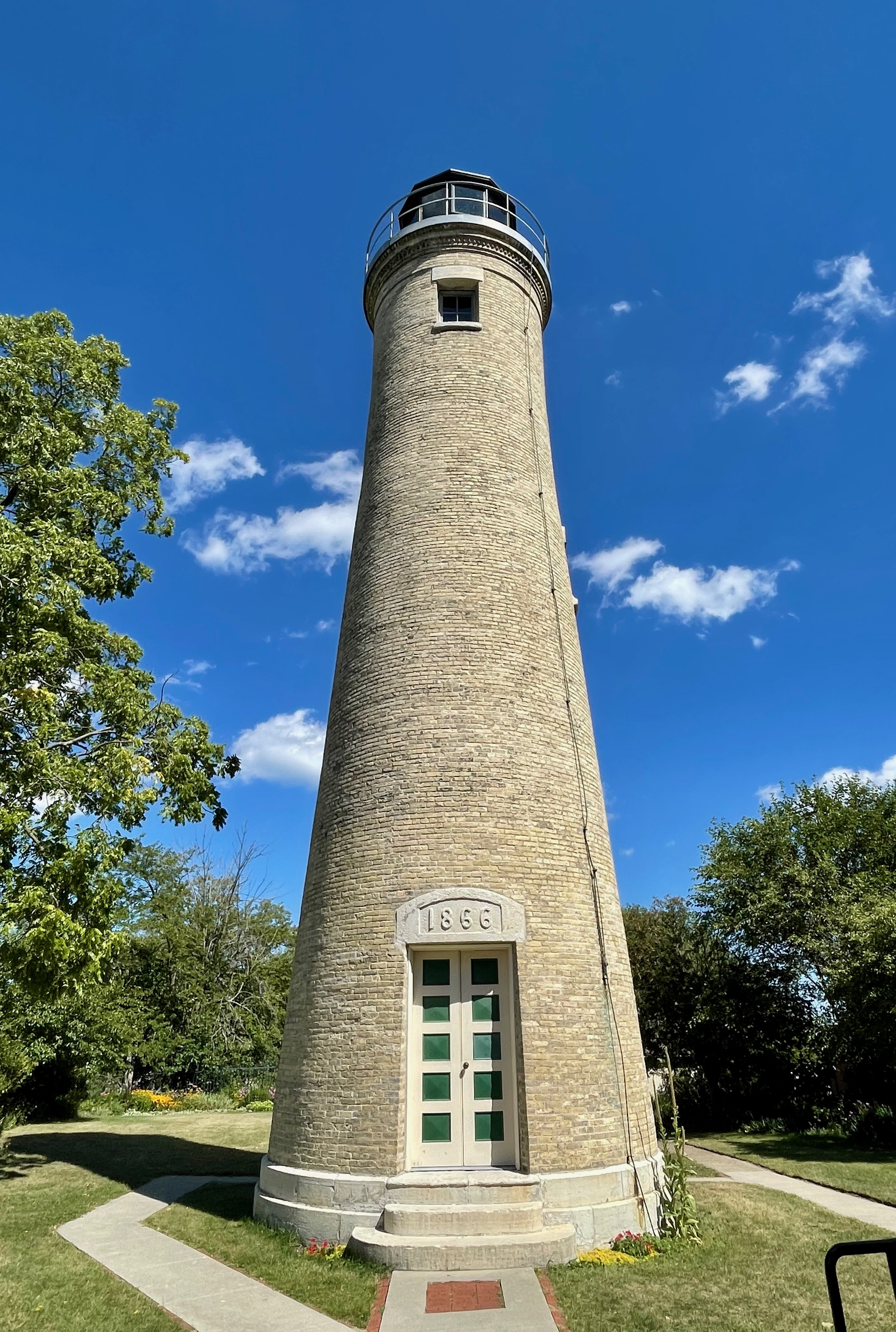
Kenosha Light Station tower

Also known as the "Old Kenosha Light", the lighthouse was replaced by the Kenosha North Pier Light in 1906. The keeper's house continued to be used for many years, however.

The light is listed in the National Register of Historic Places as the Kenosha Light Station, Reference #90000995. It has been an active aid to navigation since 1996, but is not listed in Volume VII United States Coast Guard light list. The lantern room was removed in 1913 but replicated in 1994. The Fresnel lens was replaced by a 300 mm Tidaland Signal plastic lens – a medium range lens commonly used on the Great Lakes.

A historical marker in front of the lighthouse reads:

Built by the federal government in 1866, the Kenosha Lighthouse replaces two other lighthouses constructed at this site in 1848 and 1858. Originally designated a coast and harbor light for Southport, now Kenosha, Wisconsin provided the first navigational illumination a mariner would see upon entering Wisconsin from the Chicago area. Standing 55 feet (17 m) tall and situated on a hill, the lighthouse projected light from 74 feet (23 m) above lake level. The tower is built of yellow Milwaukee Cream City brick and is conical in shape. Originally the lighthouse contained a fourth order Fresnel lens fueled by kerosene with a fixed?-white light which varied by flashes. Officially discontinued in 1906, the lantern room was later removed and replaced by a 25-foot (7.6 m) tripod mast for displaying storm warning flags and lights. Listed in the National Register of Historic Places in 1990, the lighthouse has been restored and holds an automated electric light. (1996)

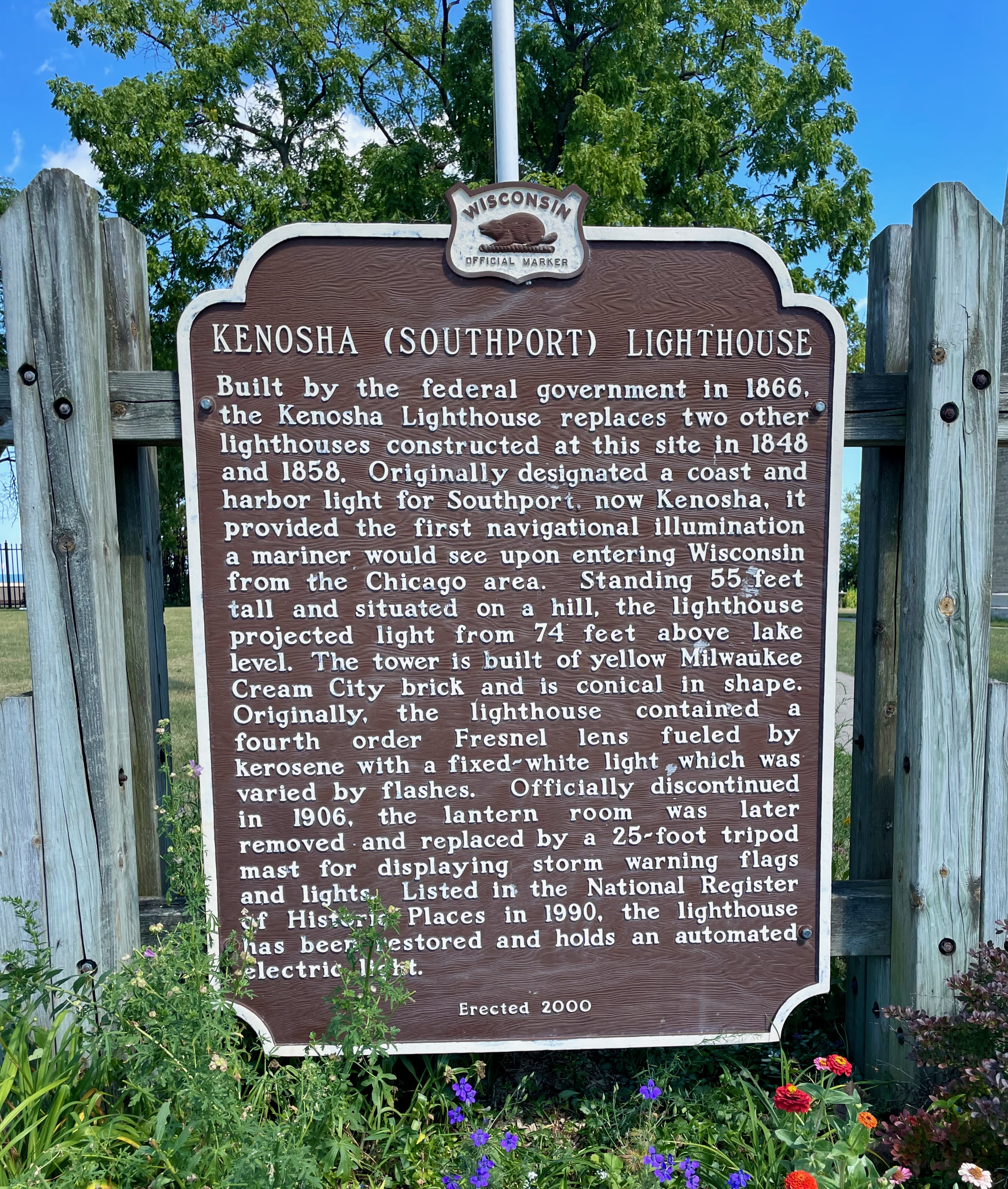
Wisconsin Historical Society official marker.

A lightkeeper's house sits near the lighthouse tower. The original section of the house was built in 1866 at the same time as the lighthouse. It was two stories, with walls of cream brick similar to the tower, with a simple rectangular footprint. The moderate pitch of the roof and the frieze board under the eaves come from Greek Revival style. In 1907 the north ell with the two-story porch was added to the house, along with a 2-story addition to the kitchen at the southeast corner and bathrooms.

The light on Simmons Island was part of an effort to make Kenosha a major shipping port, and money was spent from the 1830s to the 1880s on infrastructure like the lighthouse. But this lighthouse was too far from the harbor to give entering craft a clear bearing, so a beacon was added to the pierhead in the 1860s. By the turn of the century, the better harbors and railroad connections at Chicago, Milwaukee and Racine prevailed and Kenosha was a minor port.

Kenosha Light Station is also included on the Wisconsin State Register of Historic Places.

== Current status and directions ==
The building is currently maintained by the City of Kenosha and the Kenosha County Historical Society.

The keeper's house is open to the public on Saturdays and Sundays during the tourist season. The tower is open for climbers many weekends of the summer.

The lighthouse can be seen from Kenosha near the vicinity of 50th Street and 4th Avenue.

== See also ==
- Kenosha North Pier Light
