= Kenosha North Pier Light =

Lighthouse in Wisconsin, United States

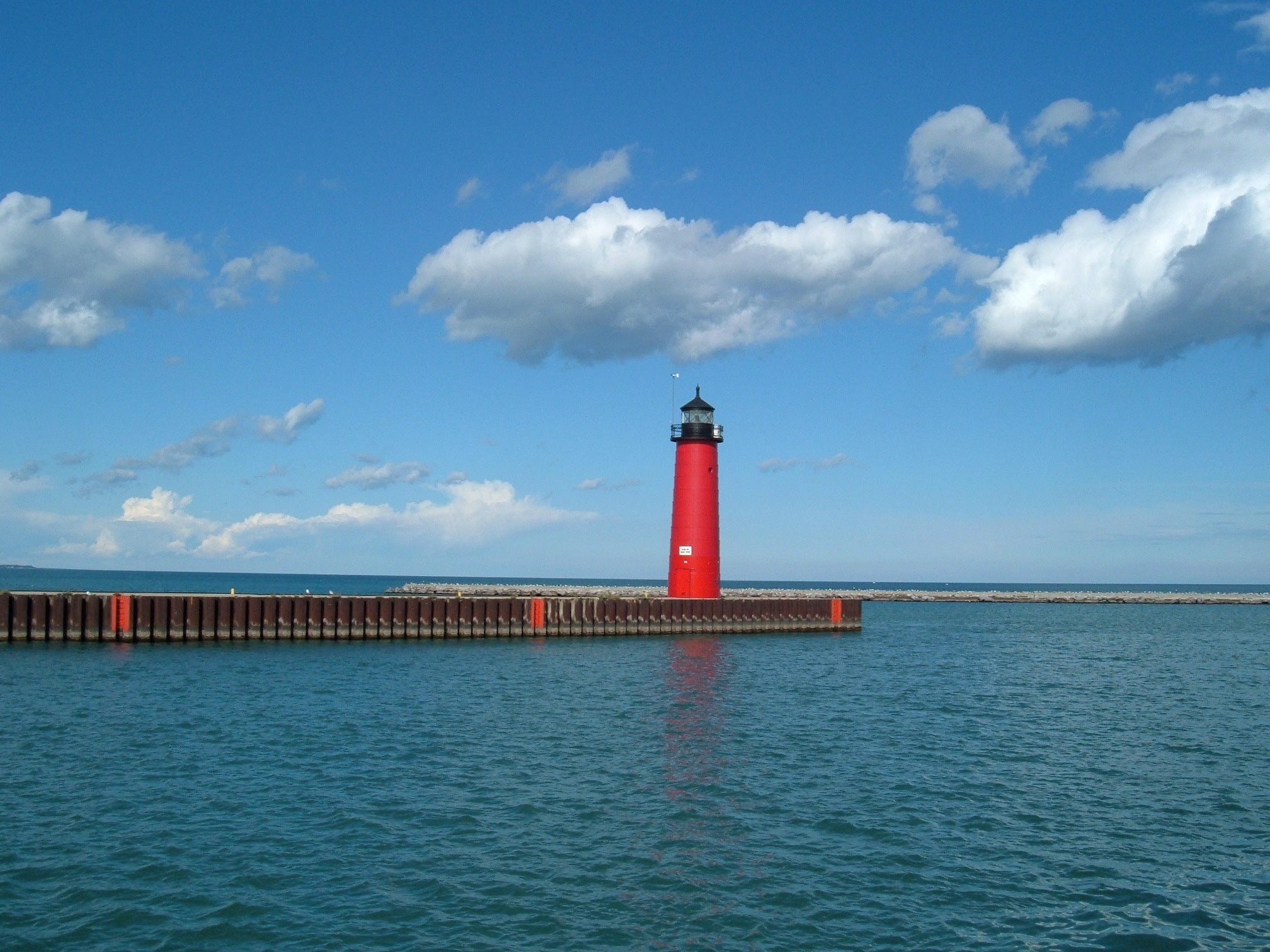
- Location: Kenosha, Wisconsin
- Coordinates: 42°35′19.7″N 87°48′30.83″W

Tower
- Constructed: 1906
- Foundation: Concrete pier
- Construction: Cast iron
- Height: 50 feet (15 m)
- Shape: Frustum of a cone
- Markings: Red, black lantern and parapet
- Heritage: National Register of Historic Places listed place

Light
- First lit: 1906
- Focal height: 50 feet (15 m)
- Lens: Fourth-order Fresnel lens (original), 9.8-inch (250 mm) Tideland Signal acrylic optic Fresnel lens (current)
- Range: 11 nautical miles (20 km; 13 mi)
- Characteristic: Red, Isophase, 6 sec
- Kenosha North Pierhead Light
- U.S. National Register of Historic Places
- Area: less than one acre
- Built by: Office of the Lighthouse; Superintendent, Milwaukee, Wisconsin
- MPS: Light Stations of the United States MPS
- NRHP reference No.: 08000545
- Added to NRHP: June 24, 2008

The Kenosha North Pier Light, also known as the Kenosha North Pierhead Light, is a lighthouse located in Kenosha, Wisconsin. "A typical 'Lake Michigan red tower'", it is a sibling to the Milwaukee Pierhead Light. The light was built in 1906 as a replacement of the old Kenosha Light Station. It was listed on the National Register of Historic Places in 2008.

== History ==
The station was established in 1856. This pierhead light is one of a succession of lighthouses in this location, which were needed as the structures were destroyed by natural processes, or became obsolete as the piers were greatly extended.

The current lighthouse was built in 1906. It stands 50 feet tall, with a gently tapered shape, topped with a cylindrical lantern. The walls of the tower are cast iron plates. Inside the tower, the first story is 12 feet six inches in diameter. From the first story, a curving cast iron stairway ascends to the second story. The third story contains meteorological equipment which is connected to the lantern above. A steel ladder leads to a trapdoor in the ceiling. The fourth story is the lantern room, which contains a modern acrylic beacon.

It currently is painted red, but the lighthouse also has been painted white in the past. The adjacent south pier and breakwater also had lighthouses, but now have cylindrical navigational lights. These included fog signal buildings and elevated iron catwalks, all of which have been removed.

In June 2008, the Kenosha Pierhead Lighthouse was deemed "excess" by the Coast Guard. Pursuant to the National Historic Lighthouse Preservation Act of 2000, it was offered at no cost to eligible entities, including federal, state and local agencies, non-profit corporations, educational agencies, or community development organizations. However, none of these entities offered to take responsibility for the lighthouse.

In 2011, the excess property was put up for auction. It was purchased by Heather McGee and John Burhani, who subsequently created "Kenosha Lighthouse Studio". Art installations, an Artist in Residence Program and arts programming for children are offered during the spring and summer months. Security cameras and lights were installed in 2016 to dissuade vandalism.

== Directions ==
In Kenosha, cross the bridge to the island on 50th Street and follow the road down to the beach at Simmons Island. From the beach, one can walk on the pier. The light is accessible for exterior inspection, but not open to the public.

== See also ==
- Kenosha Light Station - Near the north pier, on Simmons Island
