= Simmons Island Beach House =

- U.S. National Register of Historic Places
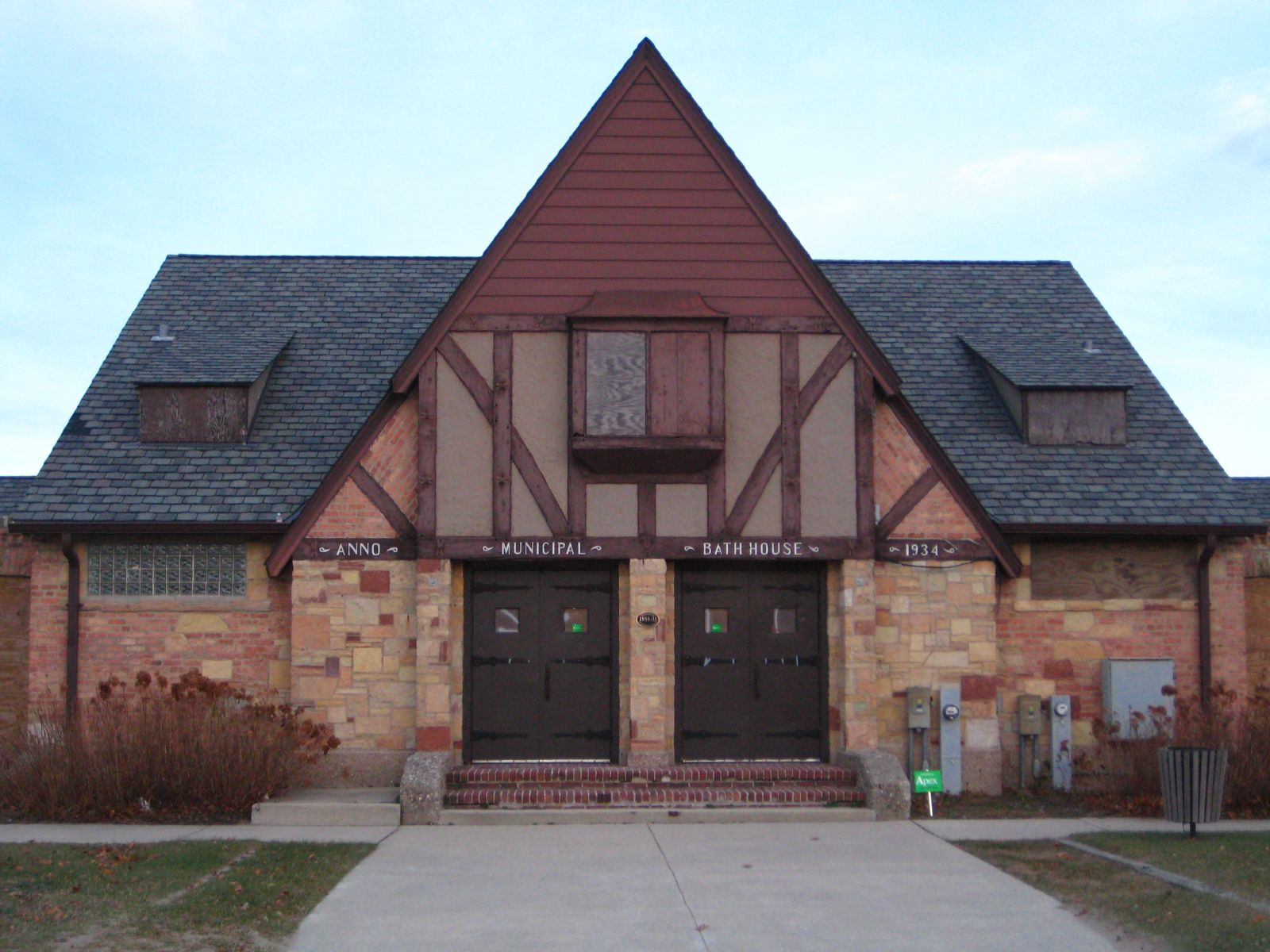
- Simmons Island Beach House
- Location: 5001 Simmons Island; Kenosha, Wisconsin
- Coordinates: 42.59098°N 87.81436°W
- Built: 1935
- Architect: Chris Borggren
- Architectural style: Tudor Revival
- NRHP reference No.: 03000057
- Added to NRHP: February 20, 2003

The Simmons Island Beach House is located in Simmons Island Park in Kenosha, Wisconsin. It was added to the National Register of Historic Places in 2003.

Land for the Simmons Island Park was donated in 1916 by industrialist Zalmon G. Simmons. In the 1930s, landscaping was done and the beach house was constructed.

The building is one-and-a-half-stories in its central block and has one-story wings. It has steep slate-covered roofs.

== History ==
The structure was once used as a public bath house. In 2008, an entrepreneur bought the building with plans to transform it into a restaurant and installed a concession stand.

== See also ==
- Southport Beach House: also in Kenosha
- National Register of Historic Places listings in Kenosha County, Wisconsin
