= John McCaffary =

American convicted murderer (1820–1851)

- Born: c. 1820; Ireland
- Died: August 21, 1851 (aged 30/31); Kenosha, Wisconsin, U.S.
- Cause of death: Botched execution by hanging (unintentional strangulation)
- Spouse: Bridgett McCaffary
- Status: Executed
- Conviction: Willful murder
- Penalty: Death

Details
- Victims: Bridgett McCaffary
- Date: July 23, 1850

John McCaffary (Note: Also spelled McCaffrey or McCaffery; all are Anglicizations of the Irish surname Mac Gafraidh common in County Fermanagh.) (c. 1820 – August 21, 1851) was an Irish-American farmer who was convicted and executed for the murder of his wife, Bridgett McCaffary. His execution by hanging was botched; he was unintentionally strangled for over 20 minutes until he died. His execution led to the abolition of capital punishment in Wisconsin.

== Murder of Bridgett McCaffary ==
On July 23, 1850, Bridgett McCaffary (née McKean) was drowned in a backyard cistern in Kenosha, a newly incorporated town in Kenosha County, Wisconsin. John McCaffary, an immigrant farmer from Ireland, was arrested and charged with the murder of his wife. His trial began on May 6, 1851, and on May 23, 1851, the jury convicted him of willful murder. The judge sentenced him to death by hanging and the death warrant was signed by Governor Nelson Dewey.

The John McCaffary House was added to the National Register of Historic Places in 1978.

=== Botched execution and abolition of Wisconsin's death penalty ===
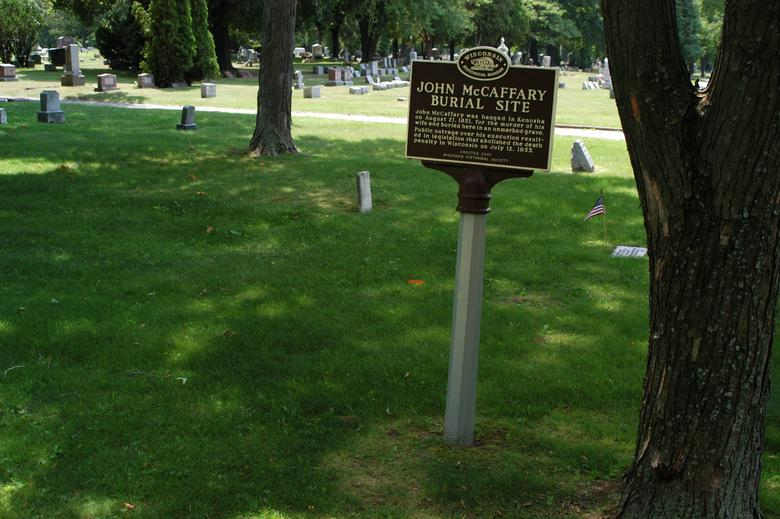
Burial marker in Green Ridge Cemetery, Kenosha

John McCaffary was the only person ever to be executed by the state of Wisconsin. He was executed by hanging for the murder of his wife. McCaffary was hanged from a tree on August 21, 1851, before a crowd of 2,000 to 3,000 people in the area located now at the corner of 68th St and 14th Ave. The hanging was initially unsuccessful, and McCaffary remained alive and struggled on the end of the rope for approximately 20 minutes as he was slowly strangled. McCaffary was buried in the Green Ridge Cemetery in Kenosha. He was the first person executed by Wisconsin after it became a state of the United States in 1848.

The spectacle of McCaffary's slow death in front of thousands led reformers in Wisconsin to press for abolition of the death penalty. On July 12, 1853, Wisconsin Governor Leonard J. Farwell signed a law that abolished the death penalty in Wisconsin and replaced it with a penalty of life imprisonment. The law is still in effect and no one has been executed by Wisconsin since McCaffary's death.

== See also ==
- List of homicides in Wisconsin
- Capital punishment in Wisconsin
- List of most recent executions by jurisdiction

== Sources ==
- Cropley, Carrie. "The case of John McCaffary". Wisconsin Magazine of History. vol. 35, no. 4 (1951–1952) pp. 281–288
- Hintz, Martin. (2007). Got Murder?: Shocking True Stories of Wisconsin's Notorious Killers. Neenah, Wis.: Big Earth Publishing, ISBN 1-931599-96-3.
- Pendleton, Alexander T. and Blaine R. Renfert. "A Brief History of Wisconsin's Death Penalty," Wisconsin Lawyer. August 1993
