= St. Matthew's Episcopal Church (Kenosha, Wisconsin) =

Historic church in Wisconsin, United States

- U.S. National Register of Historic Places
- U.S. Historic district – Contributing property
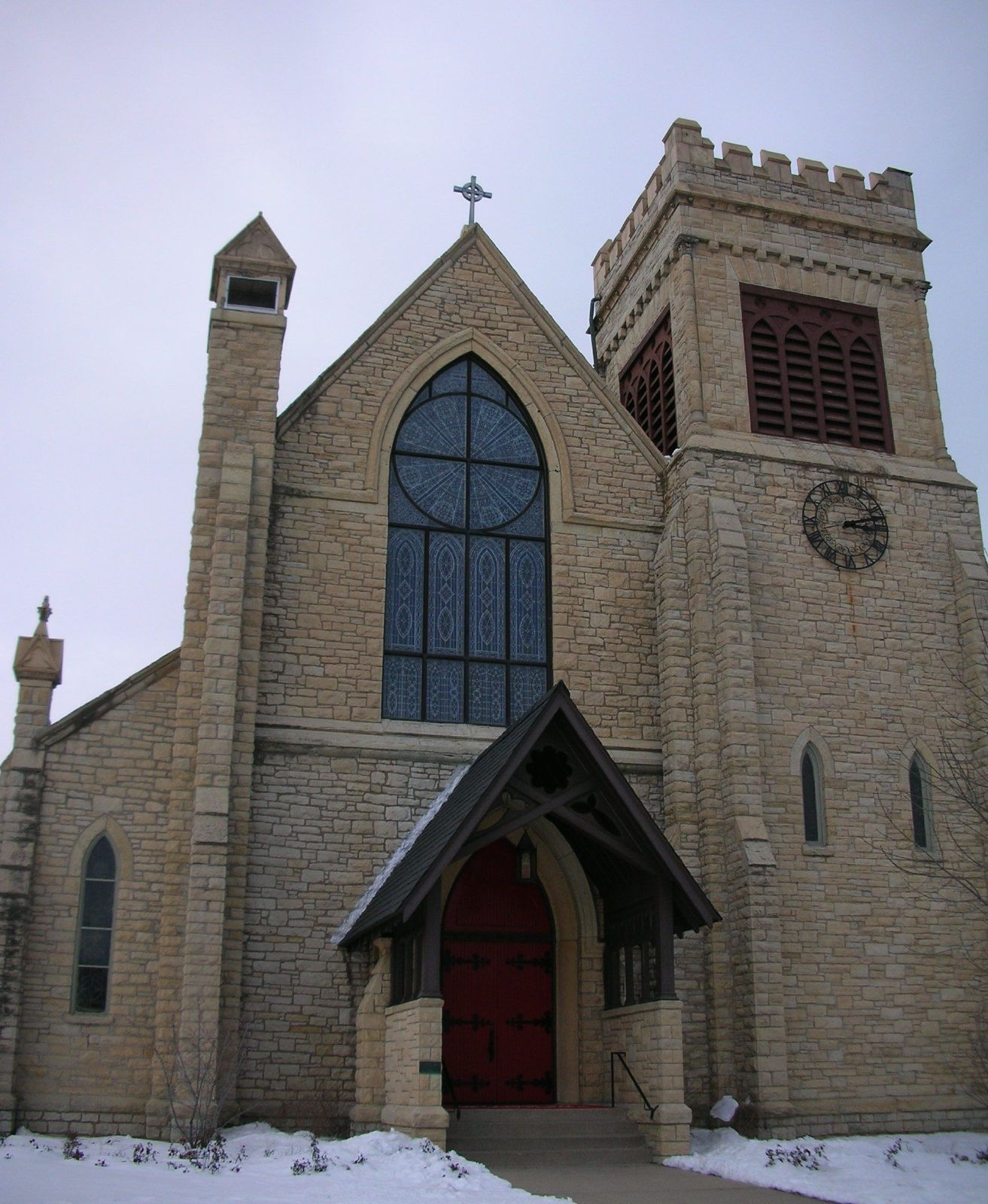
- St. Matthew's Episcopal Church

- Location within Wisconsin Location within the United States
- Location: 5900 7th Ave., Kenosha, Wisconsin
- Coordinates: 42°34′55″N 87°49′8″W
- Area: 0.3 acres (0.12 ha)
- Built: 1872-1879
- Architect: A. H. Ellwood
- Part of: Library Park Historic District (ID88002657)
- NRHP reference No.: 79000090
- Added to NRHP: June 6, 1979

St. Matthew's Episcopal Church is located in Kenosha, Wisconsin. It was added to the National Register of Historic Places for its architectural and religious significance in 1979. The church is a parish of the Episcopal Diocese of Wisconsin, formerly the Episcopal Diocese of Milwaukee.

== History ==
Completed in 1879, St. Matthew's is the oldest church in Kenosha. The congregation was founded on April 17, 1840, by Jackson Kemper, the first missionary bishop of the US Episcopal Church. A frame chapel was built in 1841 to serve the Yankee settlers of Kenosha. The church attempted to expand in the 1850s, but lost the money they raised in the Panic of 1857. In 1871, the church purchased the lost where the modern St. Matthew's was built. It was situated near Library Park, the center of the Kenosha residential community. St. Matthew's was designed by A. H. Ellwood, an Aurora, Illinois, architect who specialized in public buildings and churches. The church was recognized by the National Park Service with a listing on the National Register of Historic Places on June 6, 1979. On November 29, 1988, it became a contributing property of the Library Park Historic District.

== Architecture ==
The church was built with limestone from Joliet, Illinois and Racine, Wisconsin. Exterior ashlar is rusticated while trim around architectural features is dressed. The nave features a steeply gabled roof with stone copings as caps. Stained glass windows are grouped in pairs between buttresses. A square tower emerges from the southeast corner with buttresses on each corner. The tower has a clock and trimmed wooden louvers below a castellated parapet. The apse is on the north end of the building and a sacristy wing on the west. The original slate roof was replaced by a similar roof in 1974. A pipe organ by Ernest M. Skinner was added in 1926. In 1987, the large windows on the south facade of the church were replaced with contemporary stained glass windows.
