= Capital punishment in Wisconsin =

Capital punishment in Wisconsin was abolished in 1853. Wisconsin was one of the earliest United States jurisdictions to abolish capital punishment, and is the only state that has performed only one execution in its history.

Since its admission to the Union in 1848 as the 30th state, the only execution carried out in Wisconsin was a botched execution of immigrant farmer John McCaffary, who was hanged on August 21, 1851, in Kenosha County for drowning his wife in a backyard cistern.

Wisconsin abolished the death penalty in 1853 just two years after McCaffary's execution.

In 2006, an advisory referendum was carried out, with 55.5% of Wisconsin voters in favor of allowing capital punishment. The state legislature did not adopt any statute to implement the popular vote.

A 2013 poll by Marquette Law School showed that 46.6% of Wisconsin voters supported allowing capital punishment, while 50.5% opposed.

== See also ==
- Capital punishment in the United States
