= Gilbert M. Simmons Memorial Library =

Public Library in Kenosha, Wisconsin, U.S.

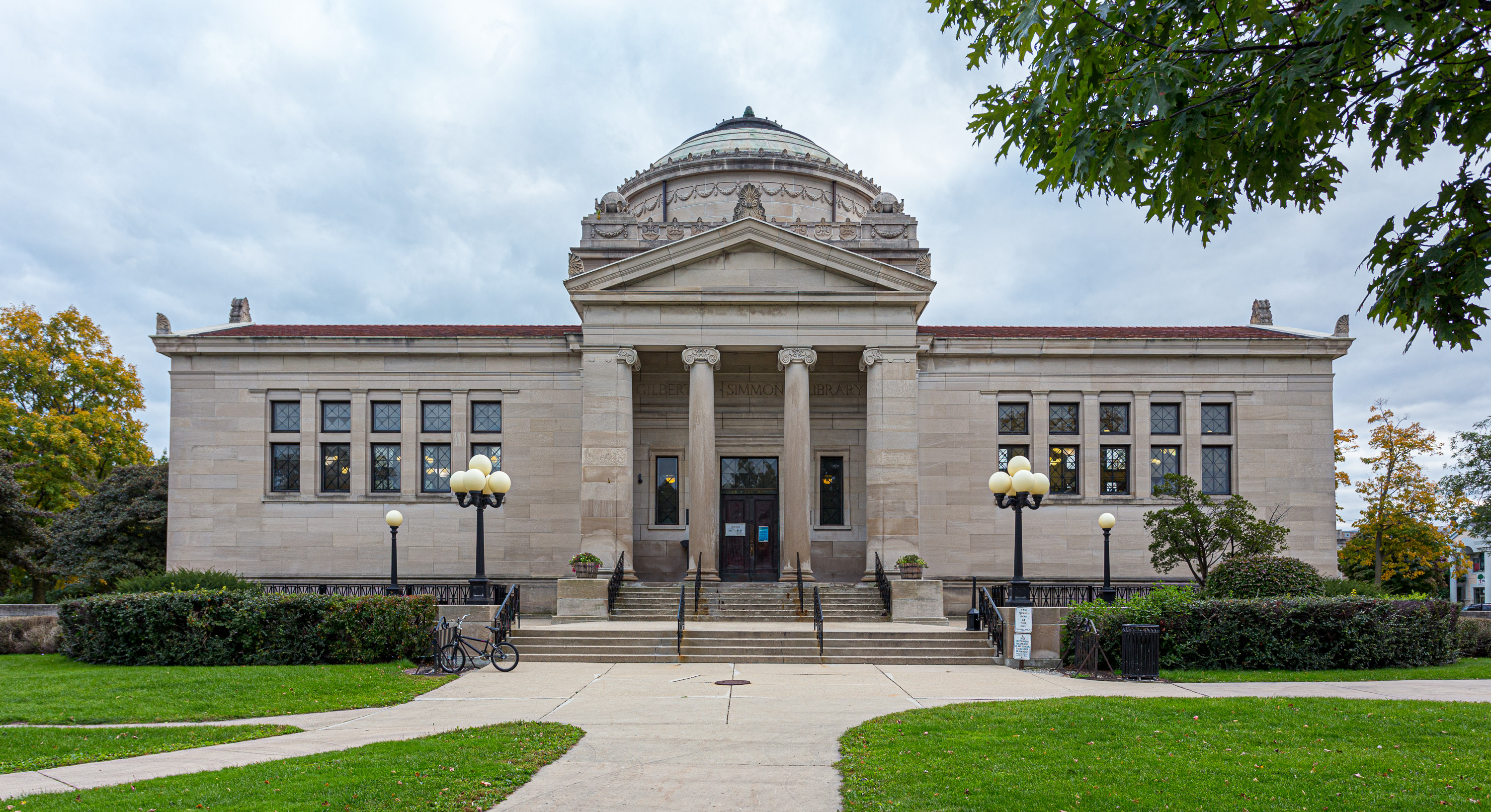
- Gilbert M. Simmons Memorial Library, front view
- Interactive map of the Gilbert M. Simmons Memorial Library area
- Alternative names: Simmons Neighborhood Library
- Etymology: Gilbert Maurice Simmons

General information
- Status: Completed
- Type: Library
- Location: 711 59th Place, Kenosha, Wisconsin, United States
- Current tenants: Kenosha Public Library
- Construction started: 1899
- Completed: 1900
- Opening: July 1900
- Inaugurated: May 1900
- Cost: $150,000
- Owner: City of Kenosha

Height
- Top floor: 3

Technical details
- Floor count: 3
- Floor area: 9,045 sqft
- Lifts/elevators: 0

Design and construction
- Architect: Daniel Burnham
- Developer: Ossian Cole Simonds

Other information
- Parking: 14
- Public transit: Metra Union Pacific North Line: Kenosha station Kenosha Area Transit, routes 2 and 4

Website
- https://www.mykpl.info/simmons
- Gilbert M. Simmons Memorial Library
- U.S. National Register of Historic Places
- U.S. Historic district – Contributing property
- Location within Wisconsin Location within the United States
- Location: 711 59th Pl., Kenosha, Wisconsin
- Coordinates: 42°34′50″N 87°49′10″W
- Architectural style: Classical Revival
- Part of: Library Park Historic District (ID88002657)
- NRHP reference No.: 74000093

Significant dates
- Added to NRHP: December 17, 1974
- Designated WHSL: January 1, 1989.

The Gilbert M. Simmons Memorial Library is located in Kenosha, Wisconsin, United States, and is a location of the Kenosha Public Library (KPL), which is part of the Kenosha County Library System (KCLS) The Simmons Memorial Library was added to the National Register of Historic Places in 1974, and was the first formal location for KPL.

== History ==
The Gilbert M. Simmons Memorial Library was the first public building in the City Park district in Kenosha, Wisconsin. Upon its completion, City Park became known as Library Park. Daniel Burnham designed the Neoclassical library while Ossian Cole Simonds developed the landscaping plan. Former Kenosha mayor Zalmon G. Simmons donated $150,000 for the building's construction on the condition that it be named in honor for his deceased son. The city agreed, and the library opened to the public on May 30, 1900. As the city's first public library building, Gilbert M. Simmons Memorial Library greatly increased the volumes of literature available to the citizens of Kenosha. By the mid-1910s, the library had 124,368 volumes and sought to expand with a branch library. The building was recognized by the National Park Service with a listing on the National Register of Historic Places on December 17, 1974. When the Library Park Historic District was created in 1988, the library was listed as a contributing property.

There are rumors of the library being haunted by a female ghost and a legend of a secret tomb in the library.

== Services ==
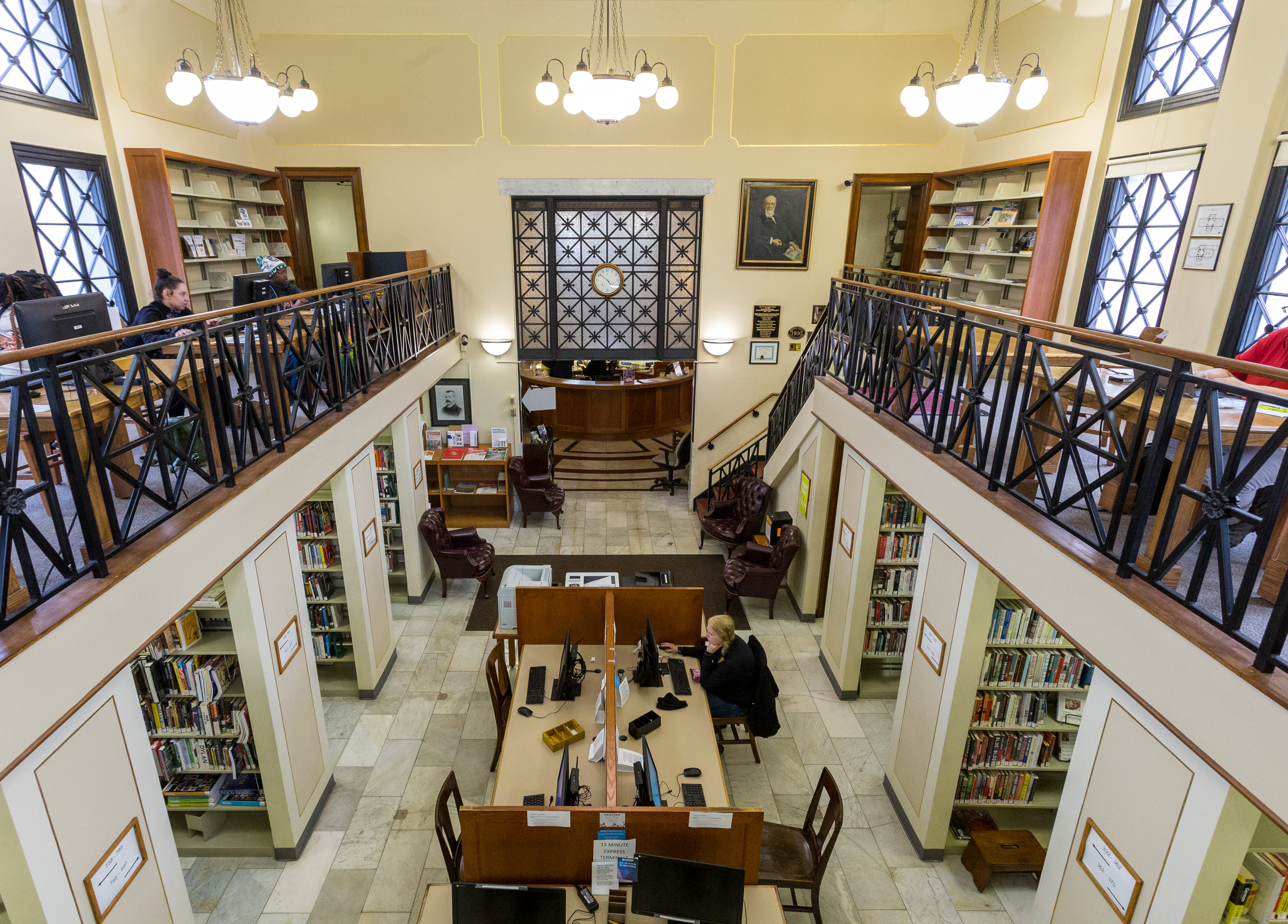
Library interior

=== Collections ===
The Simmons Library's collection count is over 13,000 items, has access to over 275,000 items via the other Kenosha Public Library locations, and over 2 million items through the partnership with libraries in Racine County, Walworth County, and Rock County.

=== Technology ===
The Simmons Library technology services include public access computers and free wireless internet access throughout the library. The Library provides access to e-books, music, movies, and other electronic collections. The library provides access to a color printer & copier for a fee. Printing at the library uses a secure release station to help protect patron privacy, with a secondary printer located in the Children's Room. A fax machine is also available for public use, with a 3D printer available by request from the Southwest Library. The library operates a Book Break telephone hotline during the COVID-19 pandemic, which reads stories to children.

The library system uses RFID pads on all library materials where users only need to place the book on a table and check out occurs without scanning.

== See also ==
- Kenosha, Wisconsin
- Library Park Historic District (Kenosha, Wisconsin)
