= Third Avenue Historic District (Kenosha, Wisconsin) =

Historic district in Wisconsin, United States

- U.S. National Register of Historic Places
- U.S. Historic district
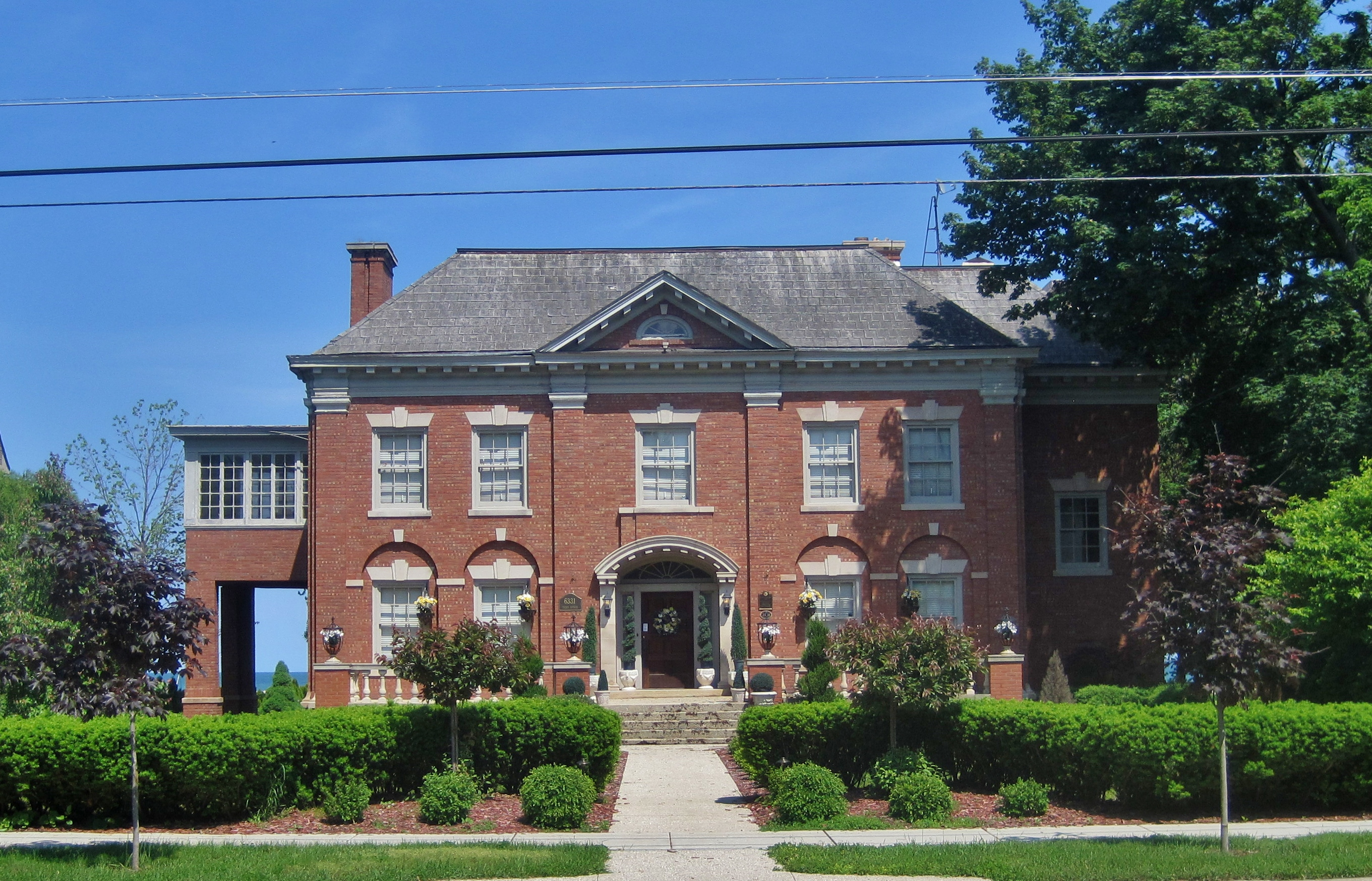
- The Harold W. Jeffrey House (1909)

- Location within Wisconsin Location within the United States
- Interactive map showing Third Avenue Historic District
- Location: Along Third Ave. between 61st and 66th Sts., Kenosha, Wisconsin
- Coordinates: 42°34′35″N 87°48′52″W
- Area: 21 acres (8.5 ha)
- Architect: Richard Philipp, N. Max Dunning, Pond & Pond
- Architectural style: Mid 19th Century Revival, Late 19th And 20th Century Revivals, Late Victorian
- NRHP reference No.: 88002022
- Added to NRHP: November 1, 1988

The Third Avenue Historic District is the "mansion" district of Kenosha, Wisconsin, United States from the early twentieth century, comprising mostly large stylish homes along Lake Michigan.

== History ==
Kenosha, Wisconsin was first settled in 1835, and by 1836, Charles Durkee had amassed a large land holding near Lake Michigan. Durkee later parcelled out his holdings for residential development. By 1882, the entire area of the Third Avenue district was settled, although few buildings from this era remain. Starting with the George A. Yule House in 1899, Third Avenue became a desirable dwelling place for Kenosha's most prominent families. The 1890s had brought great prosperity to Kenosha with Simmons Manufacturing, the Bain Wagon Works, N. R. Allen & Sons Tannery, Chicago Brass Company, and Pettit Malting Company.

These wealthy families had their houses designed by notable architects. The Alford House was designed by Richard Philipp, best known for designing the Walter J. Kohler estate in Kohler. N. Max Dunning, a Kenosha native that focused on country house design, planned the Fred H. Carpenter House and the Eugene Head House. The most prominent firm active in the area's development was Pond & Pond, who designed the Jeffrey Nash House, the Yule House, the Wilson House, and the Allen House.

The most notable industrialists that lived in the district were Charles Durkee, Charles W. Nash, Charles T. Jeffery, and Charles C. Allen. Durkee became the city's foremost politician, serving two terms in the United States House of Representatives and one term as United States Senator. When he moved to the Utah Territory to become its sixth governor, Durkee's house was acquired by the Episcopal church in 1865. It became part of Kemper Hall, a girls' school. Jeffrey was the son of Thomas B. Jeffery of the Thomas B. Jeffery Company, who assumed control of the company in 1910. This company was purchased by Nash in 1916 and renamed Nash Motors. Allen inherited his father's tannery and turned it into a nationally recognized produced of hosiery.

On November 1, 1988, the district was recognized by the National Park Service with a listing on the National Register of Historic Places.
