= Vincent-McCall Company Building =

- U.S. National Register of Historic Places
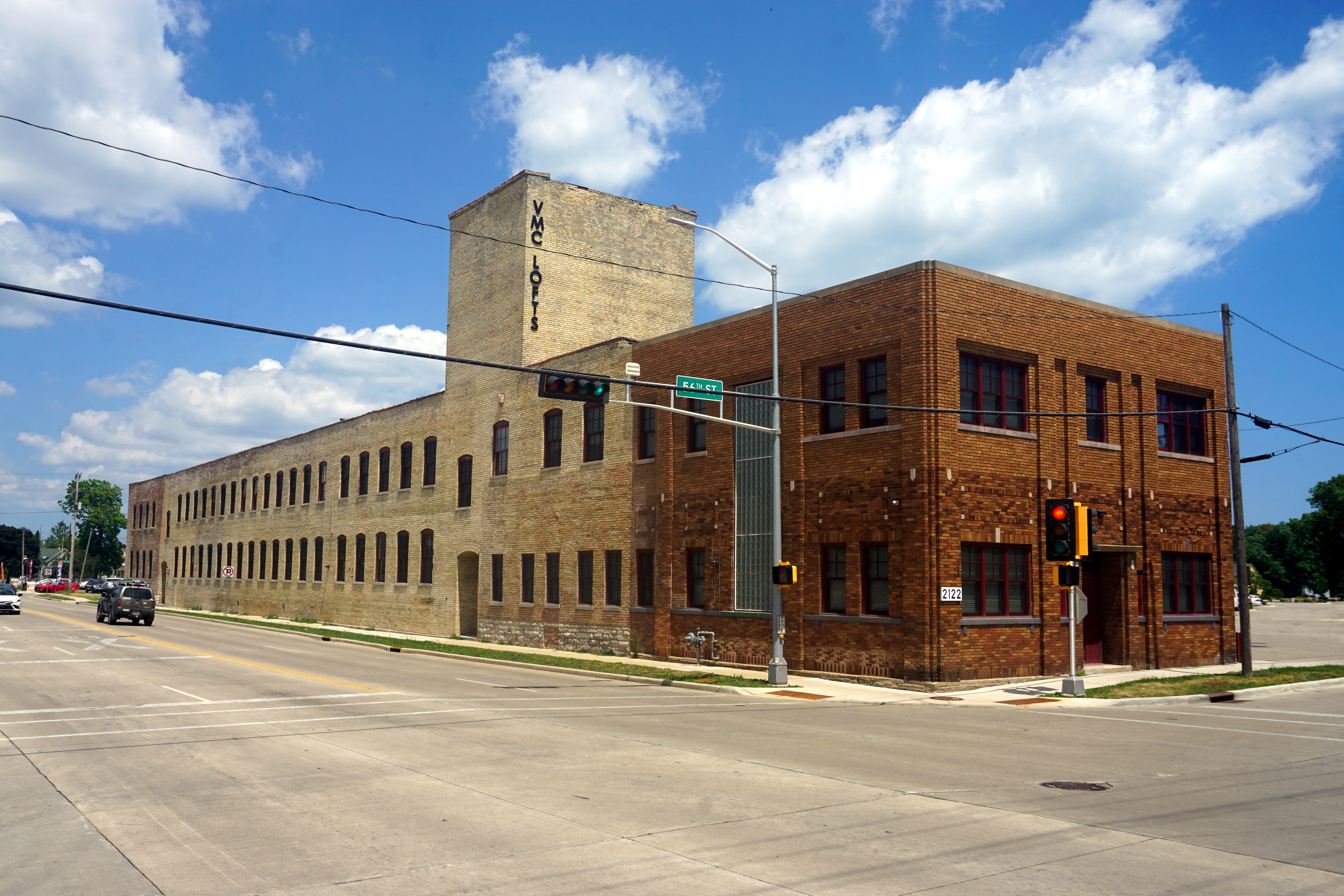
- Vincent-McCall Company Building
- Location: 2122 56th St. Kenosha, Wisconsin
- Built: 1900/1905/1908/1945
- Architectural style: Late 19th and Early 20th Century American Movements
- NRHP reference No.: 100002235
- Added to NRHP: March 26, 2018

The Vincent-McCall Company Building, now the VMC Lofts, is located in Kenosha, Wisconsin.

== History ==
The building was opened as the main production plant used by the Windsor Spring Company, later to be known as the Vincent-McCall Company. Products manufactured in the building include metal springs and various types of furniture items. During World War II, the plant produced equipment used in the war effort, including bunks and berths for soldiers. The plant remained in operation until 1963. It has since been converted into an apartment building.

The building was added to the State Register of Historic Places in 2017 and to the National Register of Historic Places in 2018.
