= Library Park (Kenosha, Wisconsin) =

- U.S. National Register of Historic Places
- U.S. Historic district – Contributing property
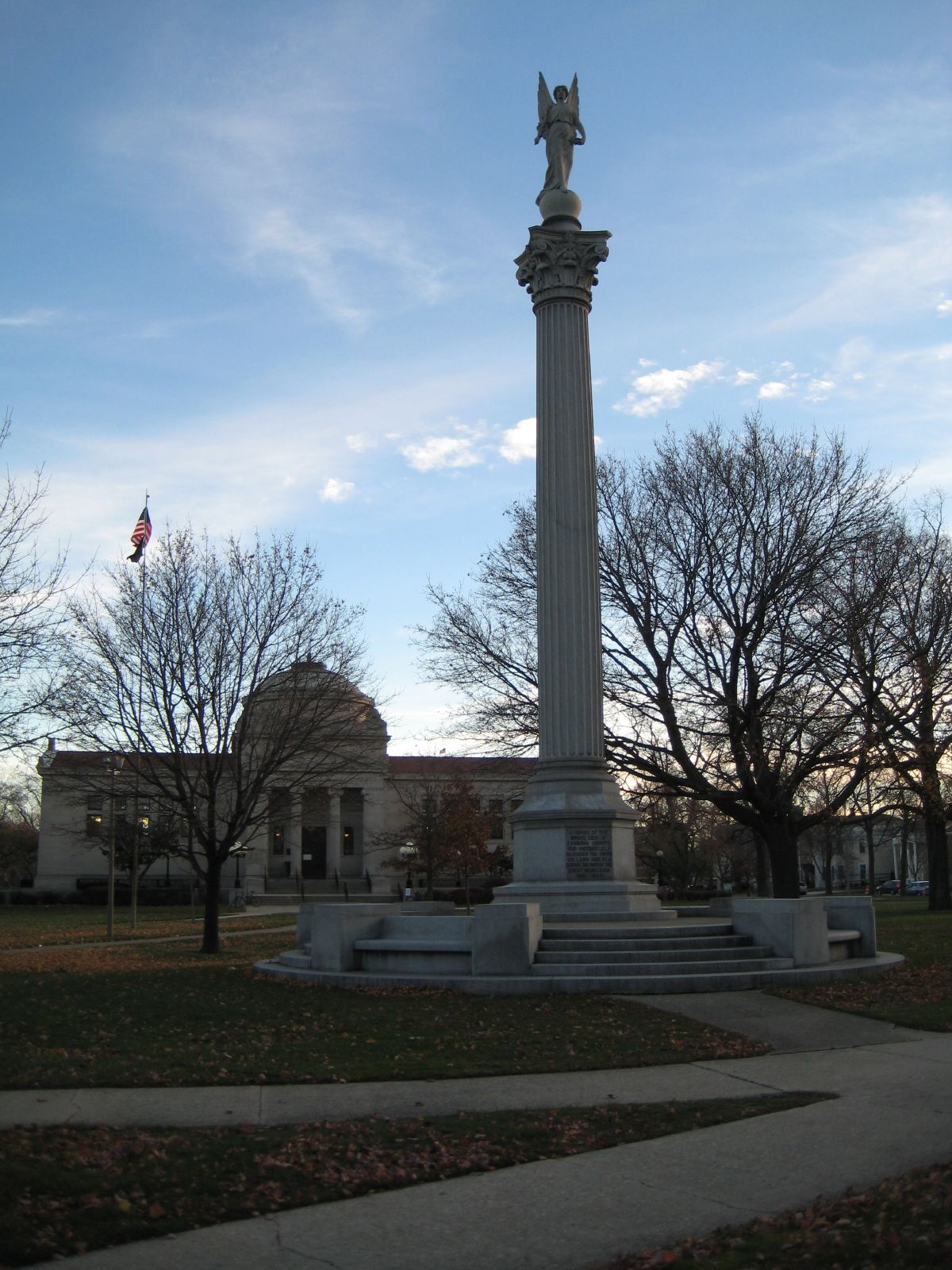

- Location within Wisconsin Location within the United States
- Location: 711 59th Place, Kenosha, Wisconsin
- Coordinates: 42.5808°N 87.8195°W
- Area: 5.5 acres (2.2 ha)
- Built: 1899
- Architect: Ossian Cole Simonds
- Architectural style: American Romantic
- Part of: Library Park Historic District (ID88002657)
- NRHP reference No.: 00000733
- Added to NRHP: June 22, 2000

Library Park, formerly known as The Commons, City Park, and Central Park, is a park in Kenosha, Wisconsin designed by Ossian Cole Simonds. It features a library and war memorial designed by Daniel Burnham and a sculpture by Charles Henry Niehaus.

== Description ==
When the town of Southport (the original name of Kenosha) was platted on October 30, 1838, a "Public Common" was reserved at Town Line Road and Kenosha Road. The land was donated by early settlers George Kimball and Charles Durkee, who wanted the old oaks to be preserved. By 1849, a Park Society was formed by local women to improve the park; their main contribution was the addition of a lagoon. Following the Civil War, the park fell into disuse and the grounds were used as an in-town pasture.

The city filled in the lagoon in 1884 after locals complained about frogs and mosquitoes. However, later in the year, a group formed to restore the park. In 1895, they built a bandstand at the northeast corner of the property. The park then became a popular shortcut to town and once again it became a popular public space as Central Park. Later that year, flower beds were planted and benches were installed. Ball playing and bicycling were prohibited.

A committee formed in 1895 to investigate the possibility of constructing a public library. A small library opened in a room above a hardware store, but the collection quickly outgrew the small locale. In 1898, Zalmon G. Simmons donated funds for a new library in the center of Central Park. When the Gilbert M. Simmons Memorial Library was completed, the park became known as Library Park. Simmons also offered to provide the funding for a war memorial to honor those from Kenosha who fought in the Civil War. Both of these structures were designed by Daniel Burnham and were dedicated on May 30, 1900. Although Burnham provided a list of suggestions for the landscape, Simmons instead hired Ossian Cole Simonds to re-plan the park. Simonds reinforced the naturalistic and informal style of the park.

Businessman Orla Calkins donated a statue of a seated Abraham Lincoln, carved by Charles Henry Niehaus, in 1909. Originally just east of the Soldiers' Monument, it was moved to the northeastern corner of the park a few years later. The library was recognized by the National Park Service with a listing on the National Register of Historic Places on December 17, 1974. On November 29, 1988, the park, Lincoln statue, and war memorial were listed as contributing properties to the Library Park Historic District. The park was individually listed as a site on the register on June 22, 2000.
