= Indian Trail High School and Academy =

Location
- 6800 60th St; Kenosha, Wisconsin 53144; United States; 42°35′00.1″N 87°53′21.6″W

Information
- School type: Public high school
- Established: 1998 (Academies); 2011 (comprehensive)
- School district: Kenosha Unified School District
- Principal: Scott Kennow
- Teaching staff: 101.41 (FTE)
- Grades: 9 through 12
- Enrollment: 2,001 (2023-2024)
- Student to teacher ratio: 19.73
- Colors: Black, purple, silver and white (formerly Black and Gold)
- Mascot: Moe Hawk (formerly Tiko the Tiger)
- Website: http://www.kusd.edu/indiantrail

Indian Trail High School and Academy is a public high school in Kenosha, Wisconsin, part of the Kenosha Unified School District. Unlike the other high schools in the district, ITHS/A houses a comprehensive high school and a magnet school under one roof; both schools share the music and physical education programs and some academic and elective classes such as foreign languages and Advanced Placement (AP) classes.

== History ==
=== The original plan ===
In September 1996, amidst a period of rapid growth in the district, a referendum was held for a new comprehensive high school. When this referendum failed, planning began on a new magnet high school, and in the summer of 1997, ground was broken for the new building. Taking its name from the nearby Indian trail which sat just east of the building, where Green Bay Road now sits, Indian Trail Academy opened on September 2, 1998.

The original building was a college preparatory school, offering three thematic Houses (later called Academies), or "schools within a school": Communications, Business and International Studies, and Biotechnology and Environmental Studies (see below for programming). The school was designed with class integration and collaboration in mind: small classrooms were joined by large, open Research and Development areas, with adjoining corners left open such that the classrooms were open to one another and to the R&D space. Students looking to attend ITA had to apply for admittance in much the same way as they would apply for college.

=== Expansion of programming ===
It was a sound concept at first, but over time, as the two main high schools in Kenosha at the time (Mary D. Bradford High School and George Nelson Tremper High School) reached and surpassed their respective program capacities, ITA was forced to accept every student who applied to the school in order to save the former two schools space, and with the influx of students came the near-destruction of the rigor of the original Academy programs. Once seen as an innovation, by the time of the 2008 referendum (see below), the school was viewed as a "waste of space", owing to its largely unused R&D areas.

The school was intended to be all-academic, with students being bussed to Bradford and Tremper for music, physical education, and other electives. As planning progressed, it was decided to incorporate physical education into ITA proper. When the original school opened, it had no gymnasium, no auditorium, no music rooms, no locker rooms, and no formal cafeteria; thus, the physical education program had to adapt to the lack of facilities. One of the school's three commons areas became a makeshift gymnasium. Lack of proper facilities allowed the physical education department to include activities not found in other high schools, such as Dance Dance Revolution, bowling (at a nearby bowling alley), cross-country skiing, archery, and street hockey. A large, sunken area outside of the school (called "The Pit") functioned as an outdoor gymnasium, housing the aforementioned archery and cross-country skiing activities, among others, and eventually allowing for the school's first pep rally in the fall of 2005.

In the fall of 1999, a choral music program was added, and one classroom became a makeshift choir room.

As a college preparatory Academy, the school operated every class as an Honors-level class; however, in the fall of 2000, the school began offering College Board-aligned Advanced Placement classes.

In 2002, the Kenosha Military Academy moved into the facilities of ITA from its former home at Reuther High School, and doors were installed in some classrooms to accommodate the new "school within a school". That same year, Mary Lou Mahone Middle School opened its doors across the street.

In 2004–05, an instrumental music program was added to further expand the program offerings at ITA; it was housed in the Mahone auditorium.

=== Referendum and building expansion ===
In 2008, the citizens of Kenosha voted on a referendum that would expand and renovate Indian Trail to accommodate a comprehensive high school as well as the existing Academy programs. Although a similar referendum failed in 2003, the 2008 referendum passed.

The renovations to the original building stripped it of the Research and Development rooms and classroom clusters in favor of rows of larger, enclosed, much safer classrooms, and turned the old main office and former commons areas into culinary arts and visual arts classrooms, respectively.

The classroom expansion opened in 2010–11, housing thirty-five new classrooms (including a fully equipped science wing) in a setting more akin to that of Bradford and Tremper, and allowed the school to bring in its first class of General Studies freshmen. That same year, the school's name officially changed to Indian Trail High School and Academy to accommodate the new program. The larger, second addition opened in 2011–12, and houses a field house, auditorium, cafeteria, new administration offices, a new school store, a technology education wing, locker rooms, health classrooms, a weight room, an upper gym, a state-of-the-art music wing, a dedicated special-education wing, and an expansion to the library.

The original school was built for 1,200 students; the new ITHS/A has a capacity of 2,500–800 in the Academies, and 1,700 in the comprehensive high school.

== Programming ==
Students at Indian Trail are required to take the core classes in English, science, math, and social studies, as well as physical education and the required courses for their Academy or field of study. Students in either the Academies or the comprehensive high school may enroll in foreign language classes or the music department, or participate in Indian Trail's sports program (see below).

=== The Academies ===
Indian Trail has four "Academies" in which students may be enrolled, each of which emphasizes a particular area of study. Students may enroll in the Academies regardless of where they live in the District. Students in one Academy are not eligible to take classes offered in another Academy.

The Medical Sciences Academy (formerly the Biotechnology and Environmental Studies Academy) emphasizes the field of medical science, offering a rigorous math- and science-based curriculum to prepare students for work in the fields of medicine. Classes include genetics, forensics, biology, lab equipment and techniques, Animal Survey, physics, chemistry, human anatomy and physiology, medical terminology, and Certified Nursing Assistants.

The Communications Academy offers an in-depth look at media technology, including graphic design, multimedia production, broadcasting, and journalism. Students in the Communications Academy produce the school's daily video announcements.

The Business and International Studies Academy teaches students to manage a business, manage money, and work on a computer. Students in this academy operate the Hawk Shop (formerly Trail Mix) school store, which is in association with the American Motors Community Credit Union.

The Kenosha Military Academy moved into Indian Trail's facilities in 2002, and was officially integrated into the school in 2006. Students in the KMA participate in a rigorous four-year Junior ROTC program which includes a regime of Leadership Education and Training (LET) courses whose curriculum is designed and sponsored by the U.S. Army, as well as Physical Training courses (separate from the general Physical Education courses offered to both schools).

=== General Studies ===
Programming in the comprehensive high school is much the same as that at Bradford and Tremper. Students in the comprehensive school can take classes in art and business which are offered separately from the Academies.

Students in the comprehensive high school cannot take classes in the Academies; however, students from the Academies can dual-enroll in the comprehensive high school if they wish to take certain electives which the Academies do not offer.

Unlike the Academies, students must live within the Indian Trail attendance boundaries in order to attend the comprehensive high school.

=== Other programs ===
Since its inception in 1998, Indian Trail has offered a Cognitively Disabled Students (CDS) Life Skills Academy, serving cognitively disabled students who have graduated from their home school and need to learn the necessary skills to survive in the real world. Beginning in 2011–12, this program was expanded to the newly built Boys and Girls Club building.

At the same time, the Successful Transitions for Exceptional Students (STEP) Program was implemented both at Indian Trail and the Boys and Girls Club. This program, like the CDS program, serves students ages 18–21 with moderate to severe disabilities, and helps them to make the transition into adulthood through continued special education support.

=== Former programs ===
In 2012–13, the Kenosha Unified School District's Infant Lab and Parent and Child Education (PACE) (formerly School-Age Parent (SAPAR)) programs moved into Indian Trail from their former facilities at Reuther. The programs were designed to help school-age parents across the district learn to make decisions that will affect the well-being of their children; students learned about prenatal and postnatal care, child development, and parenting skills. As well, the programs provided a safe environment for children of school-age parents to grow, develop and learn in while their parents were in school. The Infant Lab and PACE programs closed after the 2018–19 school year due to dwindling enrollment.

=== Sports and music ===
Originally, students who wanted to participate in either a music ensemble or a sports team had to do so at their home school (Bradford or Tremper). In 1999–2000, a choral program was added to ITA, and in 2004–05, an instrumental music program was added, giving the school a full music program. Despite not having state-recognized sports teams, Indian Trail enjoyed school colors of black and gold and a mascot of its own in the form of Tiko the Tiger.

With the expansion of the school came the expansion of the music program and the addition of state-recognized sports teams, as well as the change of the colors and mascot to black, purple and silver and Moe Hawk, respectively. Where previously one person was in charge of the entire instrumental program, the expansion brought in a dedicated band director (relegating the former director to orchestra alone). Academy students can participate in music or sports at Indian Trail, regardless of their home school.

The original ITA site housed no athletic fields (apart from those belonging to Mahone Middle School); with the expansion of the school came the addition of dedicated practice and competition sports fields and tennis courts, as well as press boxes, bleachers, scoreboards and further renovations to the Mahone football stadium to accommodate Indian Trail home football games and other events. The football stadium was renamed in honor of Charles "Chuck" Jaskwhich, a former football coach in the District, and the baseball/softball complex was named in honor of Clarence and George Bosman, former fast-pitch softball pitchers from Kenosha.

==== Conference affiliation history ====
- Southeast Conference (2012–present)

== Notable alumni ==
- Gavin Lux, baseball player
- Daviyon Nixon, American football player
- Adriana Mendez, news anchor TMJ4 Milwaukee
- Khaila Wilcoxon, Broadway actor and musical artist
- Andie Bernhardt, news reporter CBS58 News Milwaukee
- Heather Zons, principal weather meteorologist and producer at The Weather Channel
