= Gateway Technical College =

Public two-year college in Wisconsin, U.S.

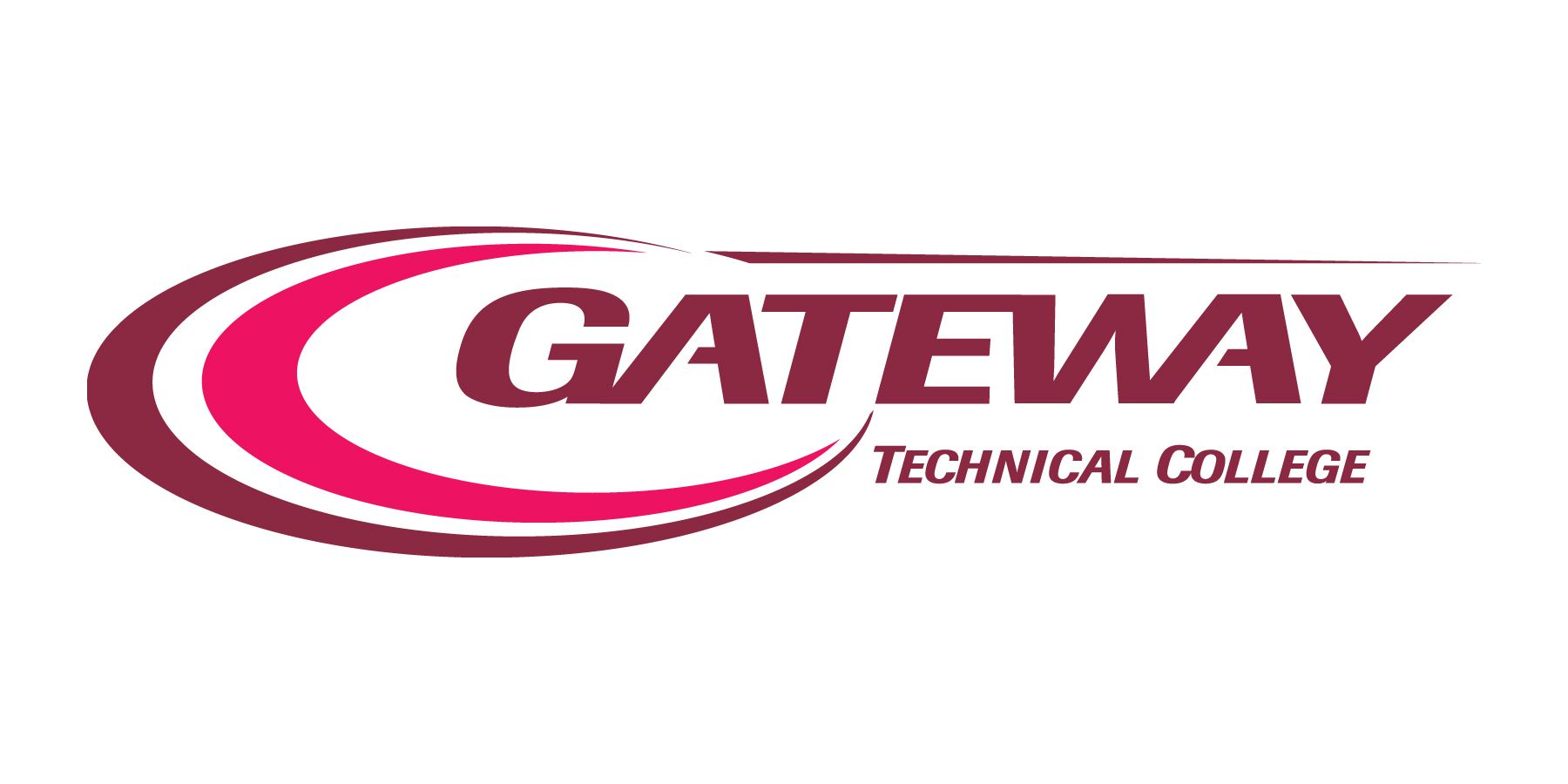
- Type: Public technical college
- Established: 1911
- Parent institution: Wisconsin Technical College System
- President: Veronique Tran
- Administrative staff: 621
- Students: 25,000
- Location: Kenosha, Racine, Elkhorn, Wisconsin, United States
- Campus: Urban
- Mascot: Rudy the Redhawk
- Website: www.gtc.edu

Gateway Technical College is a public technical college in southeastern Wisconsin. It is one of the largest members of the state-run Wisconsin Technical College System, serving Kenosha, Racine, and Walworth counties.

With over 20,000 students, Gateway offers associate degrees in 47 fields and 179 different diplomas and certifications. The college also offers certification and permit courses, as well as helping students attain GED and HSED diplomas. There are more than 37 standing credit transfer agreements with other colleges and universities, particularly UW–Parkside.

Gateway has three main campuses, in Elkhorn, Kenosha, and Racine, and six other educational centers located throughout the region.

== History ==
The Wisconsin continuation school program was established by Governor Francis McGovern in 1911. Later that year, the Racine Continuation School became the first to open under this program, and the first publicly funded technical school in America. In its earliest years, the school rented space in downtown Racine, as well as using the high school and Bull Elementary buildings for night school classes. The first class consisted of about 150 students. By 1916, the enrollment had expanded to over 1,000, the bulk of which were taking English and/or citizenship classes. Renamed the Racine Vocational School in 1917, expansion continued and over 3,000 students were enrolled in 1920. Racine's program was said to be a model for other technical schools throughout the state and country. The school purchased a site west of downtown at 800 Center Street in 1928, and the completed building, which brought all of the school's programs under one roof, opened in 1931. The school, later known as the Racine Technical Institute, opened satellite campuses in Burlington, Union Grove, and Waterford in 1967. The Racine Technical Institute building, at 800 Center Street, is now used as an annex to Racine's city hall.

The Kenosha Vocational School was founded in 1912, at the request of Kenosha superintendent Mary Bradford. A building was constructed for the school in 1914, and by 1920, with 914 students enrolled, that building had already been outgrown, requiring the school to share space with local factories. A larger building was constructed later that decade, which is now part of the Kenosha Medical Center. The Vocational Act of 1963 authorized the school to construct a new building near Bradford High School, the cornerstone of which was laid in 1965 by Governor Warren Knowles. In 1968, Walworth County was added to the Kenosha vocational district, and a satellite campus began construction in Elkhorn, although it was not complete until after the 1971 merger.

The Racine and Kenosha vocational schools shared a long partnership, serving similar roles in the heavily industrial cities of southeastern Wisconsin and operating under the authority of the state of Wisconsin. Together, they pioneered vocational nursing education in 1949 and later introduced two-year associate degree programs in 1959. In 1971, the Wisconsin Technical College System merged these school systems together to form what was designated District 6. The newly formed system was named the Tri-County Technical Institute. It became Gateway Technical Institute the following year. The current name, Gateway Technical College, was given in 1987, as part of a statewide change. Since the 1990s, Gateway has continually expanded both its enrollment and facilities, and has placed a focus on smaller educational centers that are separate from the major campuses. Today, Gateway has over 20,000 students.

== Campuses ==
=== Elkhorn campus ===
The Elkhorn Campus, which opened in 1971, is the primary Gateway facility in Walworth County. The campus consists of four buildings located southeast of Elkhorn, located near the interchange of I-43 and US 12. The North and South buildings make up most of the facility, containing classrooms, a library and bookstore, administration, and the student commons. The West Building houses the Career & College Academy (CCA), formerly known as Walworth County Educational Consortium Alternative High School, a school created in 1990 by a partnership between Gateway and the five school districts in Walworth County, which serves high school students that are considered to be "at risk of not graduating". The school's veterinary science department is located in its own building.

=== Kenosha campus ===
The Kenosha Campus was constructed before the Kenosha Technical Institute was part of Gateway. The Vocational Act of 1963 authorized the school to construct the current campus near Bradford High School, the cornerstone of which was laid in 1965 by Governor Warren Knowles. The core of the campus is a cluster of three buildings – the Academic Building, Science Building, and Technical Building – all of which are connected by an enclosed walkway. The other buildings included in the Kenosha campus are the Administration Building, Pike Creek Horticultural Center and the Kenosha Conference Center, which houses the Madrigrano Auditorium. Two of Gateway's satellite educational centers are located near the Kenosha campus: the Center for Sustainable Living and the Inspire Center.

=== Racine campus ===
Located along the lakefront south of downtown, Gateway's Racine Campus opened in 1972, on the former site of the University of Wisconsin–Racine. The Lincoln Center for Health Careers, named for the statue of Abraham Lincoln and Mary Todd Lincoln in neighboring East Park, is a three-story building with a cantilevered design that removes most of the indoor space on the first floor. The upper two floors house the Racine Campus's Nursing program. The Lake Building is the campus' "key building for student access", featuring the S.C. Johnson Student Life Center, a common area named for the SC Johnson company, and the library, on the ground floor, with classrooms on the two upper floors. The five-story Technical Building is home to most of the school's labs, with mechanical engineering on the first floor, the IT Center of Excellence taking up all of the third floor, and the Barber/Cosmetologist program taking up most of the fifth. The Racine Building contains the campus's administrative offices and conference rooms on its first floor, the Student Services Center on the third, with classrooms on the floor in between. All four of the Racine campus buildings are linked by a connecting hallway, most of which is underground.

=== Educational centers ===
- The Inspire Center (formerly the Center for Bioscience & Information Technology), located next to the Kenosha campus, is an educational center that offers additional facilities for information technology, nursing, and other health-related courses. The building also houses a childcare center, the office of the college president, and Gateway's radio station WGTD.
- The Health and Emergency Response Occupations (HERO) Center, located next to the Burlington Center in Burlington, offers training for fire medic and EMS students. The facility offers realistic simulation of all stages of patient care.
- The Horizon Center for Transportation Technology in Kenosha offers specialized training for automotive technicians and aircraft pilots. The Horizon Center is run by Gateway through a partnership with Snap-on.
- The LakeView Advanced Technology Center, located in Kenosha, offers high school- and college-level courses to students at high schools in the Kenosha Unified School District. It shares a building with the LakeView Technology Academy, a specialized public high school. LakeView also offers technical courses in engineering, manufacturing, information technology, and biomedicine.
- The SC Johnson Integrated Manufacturing and Engineering Technology (iMET) Center is an educational center located in Sturtevant. iMET, in cooperation with SC Johnson, offers courses in engineering and manufacturing. The facility includes Tarnowski Hall, a flexible manufacturing laboratory, and a precision measurement equipment laboratory sponsored by the Starrett Company.
