= Gavin Lux =

American baseball player (born 1997)

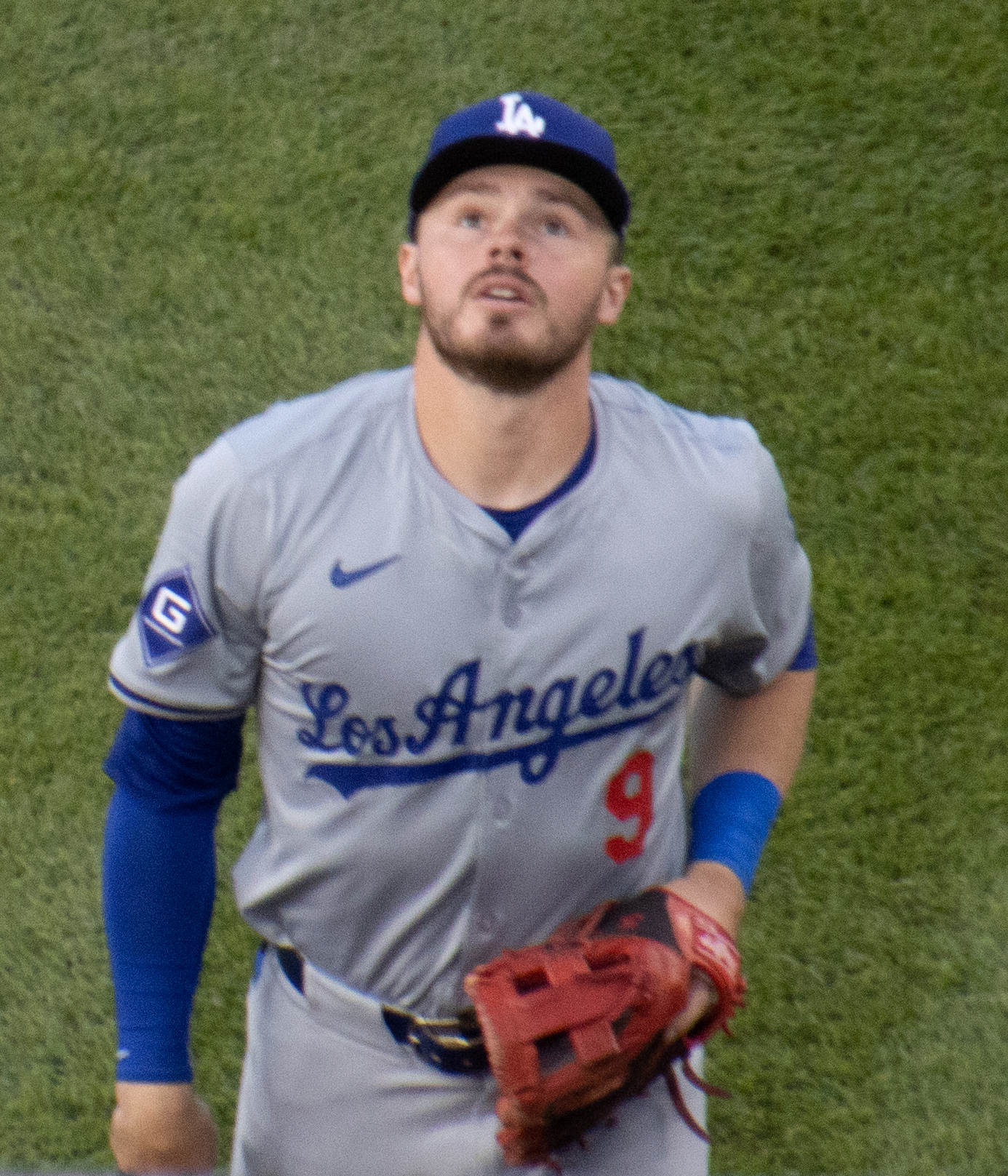
- Lux with the Los Angeles Dodgers in 2024

Free agent
- Second baseman / Left fielder
- Born: November 23, 1997 (age 28); Kenosha, Wisconsin, U.S.
- Bats: Left Throws: Right

MLB debut
- September 2, 2019, for the Los Angeles Dodgers

MLB statistics (through 2025 season)
- Batting average: .256
- Home runs: 33
- Runs batted in: 208
- Stats at Baseball Reference

Teams
- Los Angeles Dodgers (2019–2022, 2024); Cincinnati Reds (2025)

Career highlights and awards
- World Series champion (2024)

Gavin Thomas Lux (born November 23, 1997) is an American professional baseball second baseman and left fielder who is a free agent. He has played in Major League Baseball (MLB) for the Los Angeles Dodgers and Cincinnati Reds.

Lux played baseball for Indian Trail High School and Academy in Kenosha, Wisconsin. He was selected by the Dodgers in the first round of the 2016 MLB draft and made his MLB debut in 2019. As a member of the Dodgers, he won the 2024 World Series.

== Early life ==
Lux attended Indian Trail High School and Academy in Kenosha, Wisconsin. He batted .560 for the school in his senior season. He was one of the top 50 high school prospects heading into the 2016 MLB draft. He won the 2016 Wisconsin baseball Gatorade Player of the Year awards and Holy Rosary Sports Night Male Athlete of the Year Award in high school. He had committed to Arizona State University.

== Career ==
=== Los Angeles Dodgers ===
==== Minor leagues ====
The Los Angeles Dodgers selected Lux in the first round, with the 20th pick overall selection, of the 2016 Major League Baseball draft. Lux signed with the Dodgers for a $2.31 million signing bonus. The Dodgers assigned him to the Arizona League Dodgers to begin his professional career. At the end of the season he was promoted to the Ogden Raptors of the Pioneer Baseball League. Between the two levels, he played in 56 games, batting .296/.375/.399 with 21 RBIs.

Lux got a late start on the 2017 season as he dealt with a rib issue in spring training. He was assigned to the Single-A Great Lakes Loons of the Midwest League on April 19. He played in 101 games for the Loons, hitting .244/.331/.362 with seven home runs, 39 RBIs, and 27 stolen bases.

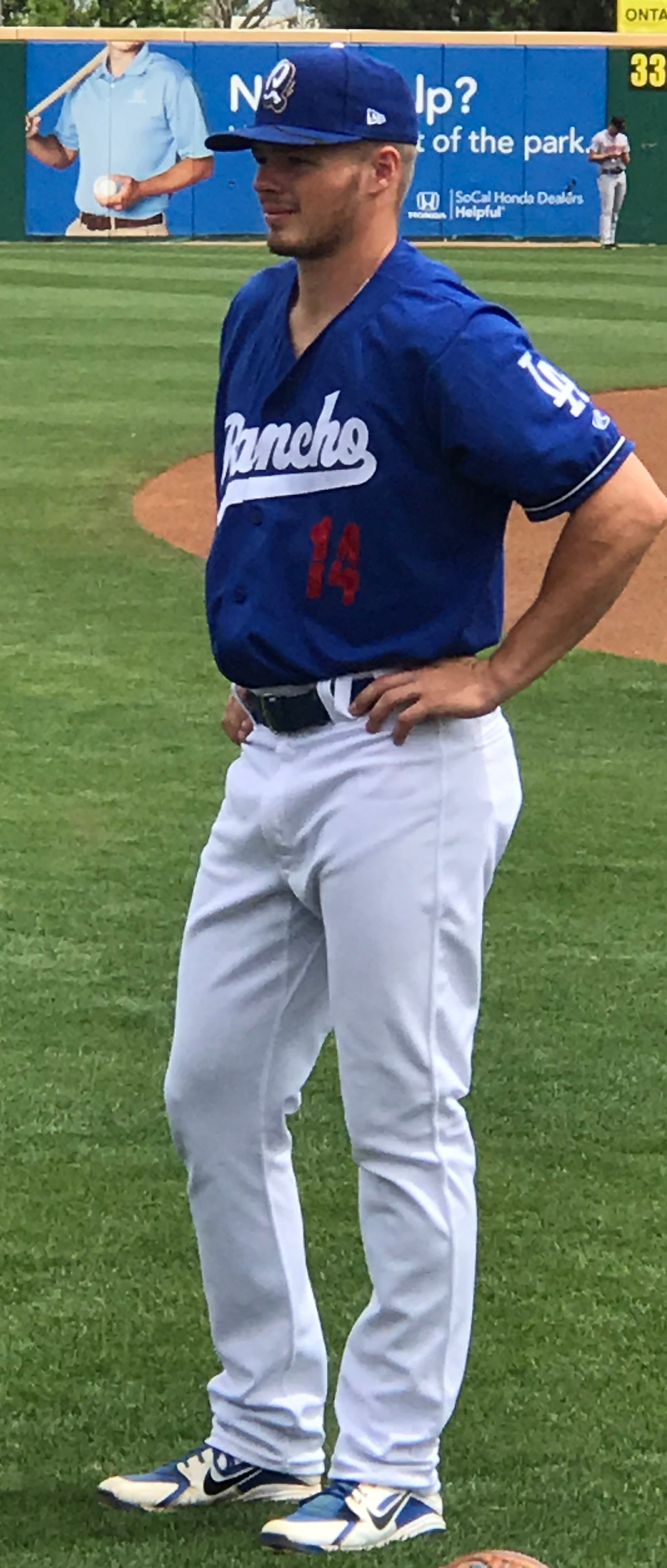
Lux with the Rancho Cucamonga Quakes in 2018

He was promoted to the Rancho Cucamonga Quakes of the California League for the 2018 season and was selected to the mid-season all-star game. He was promoted to the Tulsa Drillers of the Texas League in August. He was named to the post-season all-star team with Rancho Cucamonga. and was also named the Dodgers Minor League Player of the year. In 116 games between Rancho Cucamonga and Tulsa, he slashed .324/.399/.514 with 15 home runs and 57 RBIs.

Lux began 2019 with the Tulsa Drillers. He was selected to the mid-season Texas League All-Star Game and also the All-Star Futures Game. He was promoted to the Triple–A Oklahoma City Dodgers on June 27. He batted .347/421/.607 with 99 runs (2nd in the minor leagues), 61 walks (tied for first in the minors), 8 triples (4th), 26 homers (5th), and 76 RBIs (7th) in 113 combined games in the minors. Lux was selected as Baseball America's Minor League Player of the Year and also named by the Dodgers as their minor league player of the year for the second straight season.

==== Major leagues ====
Lux was called up by the Dodgers to make his major league debut as the starting second baseman against the Colorado Rockies on September 2, 2019. He singled on the first pitch he saw from Peter Lambert and doubled in his second at-bat. He also scored three runs in the game. On September 10, Lux hit his first MLB home run off Tanner Scott of the Baltimore Orioles. In 23 games with the Dodgers in 2019, he had 18 hits in 75 at-bats (.240 average), hit two home runs, and drove in nine runs. On October 3, in his first at-bat in his postseason debut, Lux hit a pinch-hit solo home run off Hunter Strickland of the Washington Nationals. At 21 years and 314 days old, Lux became the youngest player all-time to hit a pinch-hit home run in the postseason. He was also the youngest Dodger to hit a home run in a postseason game, a record previously held by Cody Bellinger, who homered at age 22 years and 88 days during the 2017 NLDS against the Arizona Diamondbacks.

The 2020 season was delayed and shortened by the COVID-19 pandemic and Lux missed the first week of training camp in July and was not able to regain his timing so he was optioned to the team's alternate training site to begin the season. He was not called back up to the Dodgers until the beginning of September and played in only 19 games, hitting .175/.246/.349 with three homers and eight RBIs in 63 at bats. He was left off the postseason roster for the first round and added back for the second round. He had one plate appearance as a pinch hitter in the series but was left off the roster for the subsequent series.

In 2021, Lux hit .242 with seven homers and 46 RBIs in 102 games. While he primarily played second and short he was moved into the outfield at the end of the season in order to get him more playing time. Lux became the full-time second baseman for the Dodgers in the 2022 season, playing in 129 games and batting .276 with six homers and 42 RBI. He also led the National League in triples with seven.

Lux was expected to become the Dodgers starting shortstop for the 2023 season. However on February 27, during a spring training game, his knee buckled while running the bases and he was diagnosed with a torn anterior cruciate ligament in his knee, which kept him out the entire 2023 season. Despite missing all of the previous season, Lux signed a $1.22 million contract with the Dodgers in his first season of salary arbitration.

A fully healthy Lux went to spring training in 2024 with the Dodgers still intending for him to play shortstop; however, his poor defense at the position in the Cactus League led to the Dodgers moving him back to second base. Lux played in 139 games with a .251 average, 10 homers, and 50 RBI. Lux hit .278 in the 2024 NLDS with one home run and three RBI but struggled in the 2024 NLCS as a result of an injury that limited him only six at-bats. In the 2024 World Series, Lux had only one hit in 10 at-bats, though he did walk three times as the Dodgers won the championship.

=== Cincinnati Reds ===
On January 6, 2025, the Dodgers traded Lux to the Cincinnati Reds in exchange for Mike Sirota and a competitive balance pick in the 2025 MLB draft. Lux made 140 appearances for Cincinnati during the regular season, slashing .269/.350/.374 with five home runs and 53 RBI.

=== Tampa Bay Rays ===
On January 16, 2026, the Reds sent Lux to the Tampa Bay Rays in a three-team trade in which the Rays sent Josh Lowe to the Los Angeles Angels and the Angels sent Brock Burke to the Reds. He was placed on the injured list to begin the regular season due to a right shoulder impingement. On May 12, it was announced that Lux had been pulled off of his rehab assignment with the Triple-A Durham Bulls due to a left shoulder injury. He was transferred to the 60-day injured list on May 27 and ended up missing the rest of the season.

== Personal life ==
Lux's parents are Heather and Tom Lux Jr. His uncle, Augie Schmidt, is a former minor league professional baseball player and Carthage College head baseball coach.
