= Walter Reuther Central High School =

Coordinates: 42°35′00.5″N 87°49′16.1″W

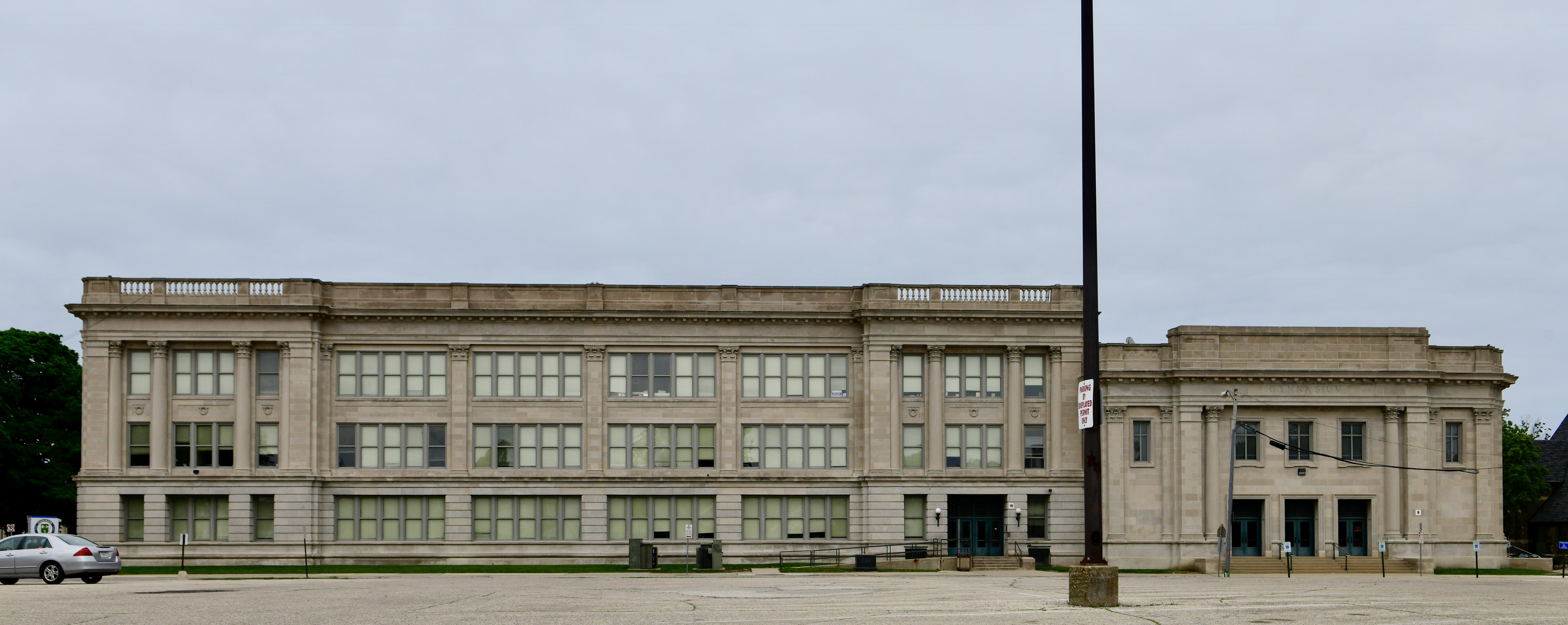

Location
- 913 57th Street; Kenosha, Wisconsin 53140; United States

Information
- School type: Public alternative high school
- Established: September 3, 1975; 50 years ago
- School district: Kenosha Unified School District
- Principal: Maria Kotz
- Faculty: 25.50 (FTE)
- Grades: 9 through 12
- Enrollment: 353 (2023-2024)
- Student to teacher ratio: 13.84
- Colors: Purple and Black
- Mascot: Bulldog
- Website: https://www.kusd.edu/reuther/
- Old Kenosha High School
- U.S. Historic district – Contributing property
- Location: Roughly bounded by 55th St., 8th Ave., 58th St., and 10th Ave., Kenosha, Wisconsin
- Area: 10 acres (4.0 ha)
- Built: 1925
- Architect: Lindl, Lesser & Schutte; John D. Chubb
- Architectural style: Classical Revival
- Part of: Civic Center Historic District (Kenosha, Wisconsin) (ID89000069)
- Added to NRHP: July 26, 1989

Walter Reuther Central High School is an alternative high school in Kenosha, Wisconsin. Part of the Kenosha Unified School District, the school serves 382 students in grades 9-12.

== History ==
=== Building ===
The classic limestone structure that houses Reuther High School was designed by John D. Chubb and built between 1924 and 1927. Occupying a massive block-square, the school is listed on the National Register of Historic Places as one of the structures comprising Kenosha's Civic Center Historic District. When built, it was called Kenosha High School; Central High School is the name engraved in its namestone. It later became Mary D. Bradford High School, and ultimately Walter Reuther Central High School, named for United Auto Workers leader Walter Reuther.

The building is the third iteration of Central High School. The first was built in 1849 and housed "all the children who attended public school classes in the town, from first grade up." but was deemed inadequate by 1890. The process of building the second started in July 1890, on the site of an existing grade school, which was demolished to make way for the new High School. Students of the grade school were temporarily relocated to the nearby Courthouse. The second was finished in September 1891, however it was poorly constructed and by 1910 the Auditorium and Assembly Hall portions of the building had been condemned. In 1922, a special committee appointed by the school board found the high school building to be inadequate, and the plans to build the third across the street were set in motion. A contract to have the new building finished by May 26, 1926 was signed, and the cornerstone was laid on November 20, 1924. Finally, on February 22, 1926, 74 days before the contract date, classes were conducted in the new building. The second building was remodeled and converted to Central Junior High School, and later served as an annex to the High School. The second building was eventually demolished in 1980 and replaced with a parking lot. A major remodeling project was completed in 1993 at an approximate cost of $3,500,000. Restoration of the building's exterior limestone was conducted in the late 2000s.

=== School history ===
After voters rejected bond referendums to build a third high school in 1970, a high-school level night school program was established from September 8, 1971 as a temporary measure; the program was primarily based at Tremper. From February 3, 1975, the night high school was moved to a former University of Wisconsin–Parkside extension building at 39th Avenue and Washington Road, which had been leased to KUSD. On April 28, 1975, KUSD established an alternative high school program, which incorporated the previously established night high school. The alternative high school, named after Walter Reuther on June 16, opened on September 3.

In 1980, following expansion and renovation of the former UW-Extension building, Reuther High School and Mary D. Bradford High School (formerly Central High School) swapped facilities. Mary D. Bradford High School took up residence in the newly remodeled and expanded former UW-Extension building. Reuther moved to the former Mary D. Bradford High School located on Sheridan Road and 57th Street, where it still exists today. It was originally known as Reuther Alternative High School until the summer of 1991 when it adopted the name Reuther Central High School, a nod to the building's former name as Central High School. Over the years, Reuther Central High School has undergone several changes to accommodate curriculum and teaching style.

The building suffered damage in August 2020 during unrest which occurred following the shooting of Jacob Blake.

== Architecture ==
The building features a neo-classic auditorium of 1,400 seats with commissioned original oil paintings by Chicago artist Gustave Brandt, including a 44-foot fresco over the proscenium symbolizing Kenosha history over a century and emphasizing the arts and sciences. The 1926 school yearbook explained that the panel "shows the High School as the culmination of the ideals of such educators as Col. (Michael) Frank (considered the father of Wisconsin's public-school system), Col. (John) McMynn (the school's first principal) and Mrs. (Mary D.) Bradford (the former superintendent of Kenosha public schools); a high school with a curriculum varied enough to fit the needs of all classes of students and one which will place Kenosha among the first of the cities of Wisconsin in education."

Two large allegorical canvases next to the organ screens illustrate physical training and mental training, with smaller canvases along the balcony edge portraying educational subjects. The auditorium features two backlit, leaded stained-glass ceilings over the orchestra floor and balcony.

== Academics ==
Reuther has three academic programs. All students are required to meet the same academic standards as the other high school students in the district.

=== Blended Learning ===
Beginning in 2013-14, Reuther's Expeditionary Learning program shifted its focus to Blended Learning, a model emphasizing the blend of traditional teaching and modern technology-enhanced instructional methods. Students in the Blended Learning program engage in online learning components in their core classes which allow them flexibility and control over their pacing of learning, and flexible scheduling allows for face-to-face interactions with teachers while still allowing for the online components.

=== Transition Program ===
Beginning in 1999-2000, the Transition Program was designed to reengage struggling regular education students, targeting students with health issues that have prevented them from attending a traditional high school program. Homebound students may be placed in Transition prior to being returned to a traditional schedule. Transition's curriculum allows students to attend a morning or afternoon computer lab session to earn credits at an accelerated pace.

=== Adult Education ===
The Adult Education program caters to those students wishing to graduate with a KUSD Competency Diploma. This program prepares students to take the Iowa Tests of Education Development (ITED) for graduation. Students are able to work and study at their own pace with help from instructional staff to set schedules and meet requirements and deadlines.
