= Kenosha Unified School District =

School district in Wisconsin, US

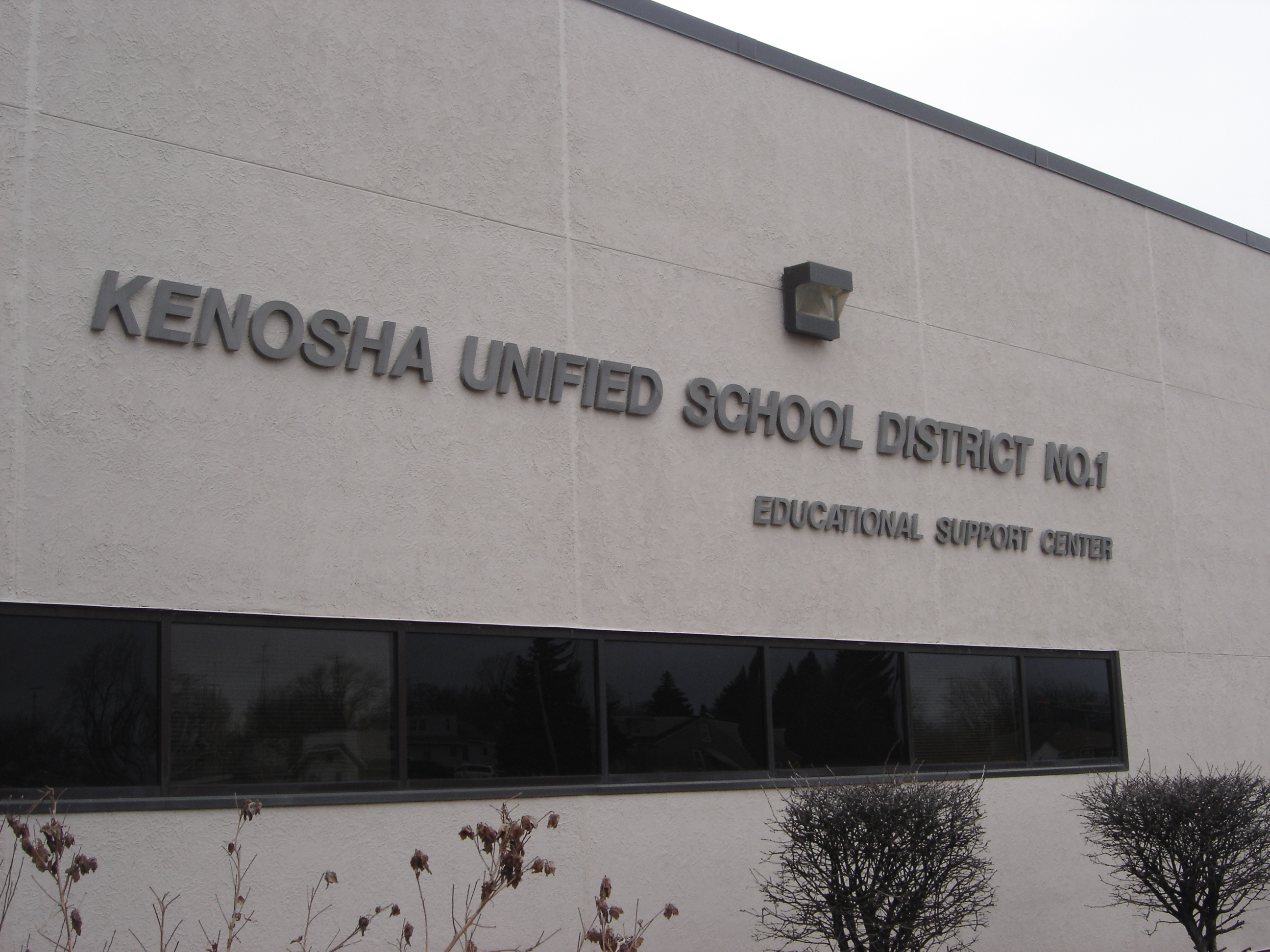
- The Kenosha Unified School District Educational Support Center in 2011. In 2012, the district dropped the "No.1" from its name.

Address
- 3600 52nd Street Kenosha, Wisconsin, 53144; United States
- Coordinates: 42°35′21″N 87°51′09″W

District information
- Type: Public school district
- Grades: Pre-K–12
- Established: June 27, 1967; 59 years ago
- Superintendent: Jeffrey Weiss
- Chair of the board: Carl Bryan
- Schools: 33
- Budget: $320.4 million (2021–2022)
- NCES District ID: 5507320

Students and staff
- Enrollment: 18,719 (2023–2024)
- Teachers: 1,320.22 (on an FTE basis)
- Staff: 2,370.31
- Student–teacher ratio: 14.18

Other information
- Website: www.kusd.edu

Kenosha Unified School District (KUSD) is the school district serving the city of Kenosha, the village and town of Somers, and the village of Pleasant Prairie in Wisconsin. With an enrollment of over 18,000 students, it is among the five largest public school districts in the state.

== District logo ==
The crest in the KUSD logo, introduced in April 2022, is inspired by the Potawatomi, the Indigenous people who were the original residents of what became Kenosha County and its communities; in the Potawatomi language, the tribal name translates to "keepers of the fire." The crest incorporates a large blue flame representing Kenosha County; on the blue flame are superimposed a central white flame representing the largest local community, the City of Kenosha, and three gray wisps of flame representing the towns of Pleasant Prairie and Somers along with the village of Somers. The previous logo and crest, also inspired by the Potawatomi, consisted of three reversed pyramidal white, blue, and gold torches with white flames.

== History ==
=== Origins and early years ===
In early 1845, Southport pioneer Michael Frank, a strong advocate of free public education and a territorial representative for Racine County, Wisconsin, (Note: The city and county of Kenosha were chartered in 1850, prior to which they were part of Racine County.) introduced a bill to establish a school district for the Southport (Kenosha from 1850) community. The legislation, intended to give local voters the authority to enact a $2,000 tax levy for erecting and maintaining a school building and paying teachers, was approved on February 24, 1845, subject to passage of a local referendum by May 1. Despite much opposition, Frank convinced enough voters to pass the measure on April 30, establishing "Southport School District 1."

On June 16, 1845, the first free public school in Wisconsin opened in the basement of Southport village's St. Mark's Catholic church; primary school classes were also held in various local buildings, including in an existing "white school house" dating from 1841. Village voters, however, refused to fully fund a public school system, and in 1846, the north ward of Southport seceded to form a second school district. With effect from February 10, 1847, "Southport School District 2" received territorial approval to levy a tax to purchase land and build a schoolhouse. The school, subsequently known as the "North Ward School," opened in its new two story building on December 6, 1847; it was at least initially a fee-paying school. (Note: Though a public school, the Telegraph-Courier at the time of opening noted "The school, in due time, will be made free," suggesting it had opened as a fee-paying school.)

On October 18, 1847, voters in School District 1 passed the required tax levy for a dedicated school building. Consequently, the first free graded public school in the state was built, opening on July 31, 1849. Although designated a "high school," it enrolled all students from the primary grades and above. By 1854, Michael Frank, then the Kenosha school superintendent, proposed merging both city school districts to reduce costs. Effective April 1, 1856, the two districts were combined into the "City of Kenosha Public School District," incorporating portions of Pleasant Prairie and Somers. In the summer of 1856, a new building for primary school students - known simply as the "New Building" - was built to the east of the high school. In 1861, the first high school graduates received diplomas.

An inadequate curriculum and the effects of the Civil War resulted in low enrollments and few high school graduates through the 1880s. In January 1878, the Durkee primary school opened; named after the late Kenosha pioneer and U.S. senator Charles Durkee, it was the first school in the district named for an individual. In 1889, the University of Wisconsin accredited the Kenosha High School. In July 1890, the first high school building and the "New Building" were demolished; the new high school, designed by Frank Shaver Allen, opened in September 1891, but continued to serve students from the first through 12th grades.

=== Development and expansion ===
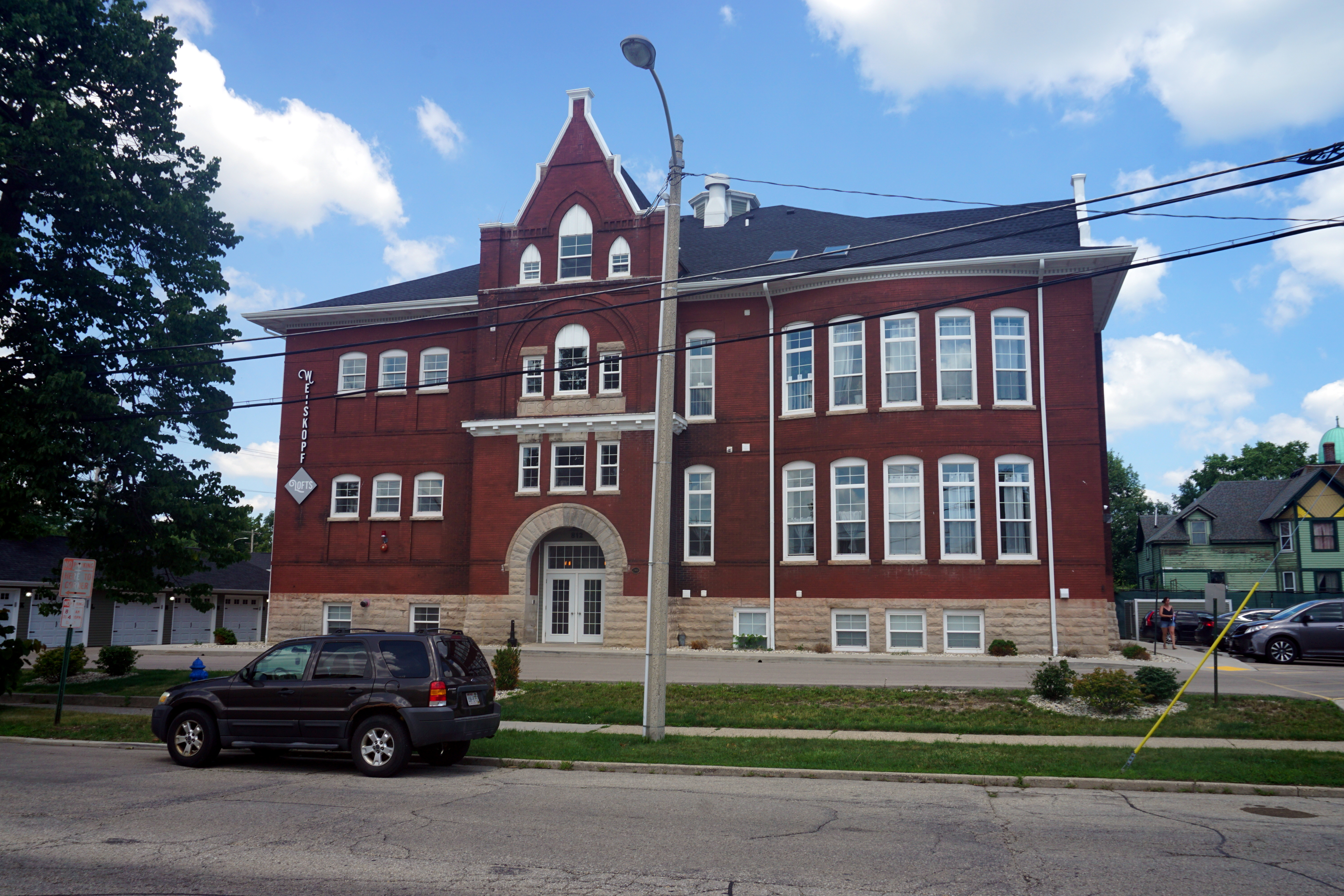
The former Weiskopf School building, which was converted into apartments in 2019.

From 1890, and for the next four decades, Kenosha's population doubled each decade as the region industrialized and drew numerous immigrants, resulting in growing enrollment. New grade schools were established, supplanting the existing Durkee and Second Ward (formerly North Side) schools; the latter became the Weiskopf School in 1902. In 1904, the previously part-time post of city schools superintendent was established on a permanent basis, with P. J. Zimmers as the first regular officeholder. The first kindergartens opened in fall 1905 at the Gillett and Durkee grade schools. In 1906–07, a wing was added to the west side of the high school; the wing was designed by noted architect T. Charles Gaastra, who had also designed a new Durkee school building (1905), and who subsequently designed the original Edward Bain (1907) and the Columbus (1910) grade schools.

In 1910, Mary D. Bradford became the first woman to lead a Wisconsin school district and one of only a few female school superintendents nationwide. Her tenure, during which she developed a modern school district, witnessed the introduction of more comprehensive curricula, special education and vocational training programs, and consistent, higher standards for teachers. In April 1911, an "open-air school" was pioneered to address high rates of student malnutrition and illness; the program, which taught students in a portable structure and lasted until the 1940s, provided students with nutritious meals and fresh air. Continued growth led to the introduction of portable classrooms in the 1913–14 school year. In 1915, to improve educational standards, Bradford introduced the "6-3-3" (elementary, junior high, and senior high) educational model; the junior high schools first admitted students in fall 1916. Both junior high programs, the Lincoln Junior High and the Frank Junior High, respectively, were housed in the Frank elementary school until the Lincoln Junior High building opened in February 1917.

Additional schools were built to keep pace with enrollment, which by 1925 had drastically risen to nearly 11,000 students, up from 4,000 in 1916. In February 1926, a new and larger central high school replaced the former building, which was retained as an annex to the new structure. In 1929, through the efforts of local disabled rights advocate Dorothy Schackmuth (1894–1951), the Kenosha Orthopedic School opened as the first Wisconsin school for special-needs education; it served students with disabilities until 1962. By the 1930s, the school district consisted of 17 schools: the high school, three junior high schools, 11 elementary schools, one ungraded primary school, and the Orthopedic School. In 1940, Kenosha (Central) High School was renamed Bradford High after the district's former leader. The effects of the Depression and World War II prevented significant investment in the school system until the 1950s.

=== Growth, consolidation, and unification ===
In the postwar years, the student population of the Kenosha school district more than doubled to 20,000, staff numbers tripled to 1,200, and the number of school buildings doubled to 34. Beginning in May 1960, junior high school libraries and the Bain elementary school library, which had previously been managed by the Kenosha Public Library, were progressively transferred to the Kenosha school district; the transition was completed in June 1962. Additional elementary school libraries were established across the district through 1964. To accommodate the student influx, a second high school, Tremper High, opened on September 9, 1964. Initially sharing facilities with Bradford high school, Tremper high school was installed in a new, dedicated building that December 7.

Reflecting local changes, the district became more diverse during this period. Although Kenosha had long had Black and Latino communities, whose children had received fully integrated educations in city schools, both communities remained small until the postwar period due to widespread housing and employment discrimination, which had deterred many from those communities from moving to the city. The situation subsequently began to improve, and advocacy by the local chapter of the NAACP led to Ann L. Williams (1914–1974) becoming Kenosha's first Black public school teacher in 1955. In 1956, Kenosha native Mary Lou Mahone (1926–1999) became the first Black PTA president, at Weiskopf Elementary. The numbers of Black and Latino students notably increased during the 1960s.

Regionally, educational systems were gradually consolidated. Into the 1960s, most students from Pleasant Prairie and Somers came under a "tuition system," in which they attended their respective town's schools through the eighth grade, then attended Kenosha high schools, for which the town governments paid fees to the Kenosha school district. From 1959, newly enacted state legislation phased out tuition-school systems. The following year, a Pleasant Prairie-Somers committee recommended the townships form a unified school district with Kenosha. In the unified district model, the new school district would have full financial control and the ability to levy taxes for funding. Though all three local governments initially favored the proposal, Kenosha reversed its endorsement following city elections in 1962. In a September 8, 1964 referendum, Kenosha voters rejected forming a unified district with the other two communities. Both Pleasant Prairie and Somers were eventually given a March 8, 1965 deadline to either form a K-12 school district or become a joint district along with Kenosha. As opposed to a unified district, the proposed joint district would have its budgets and tax levies determined by the Kenosha city council and the town chairs of Pleasant Prairie and Somers. After local voters rejected establishing a high school for Pleasant Prairie and Somers, the leaderships of both communities merged their school systems into a joint district with Kenosha on March 29.

The "Joint School District No. 1, City of Kenosha and Towns of Pleasant Prairie and Somers" was established on June 18, 1965. On July 1, 13 former Kenosha county elementary school districts were dissolved and consolidated into the new joint district; the former Kenosha city school board assumed charge until elections the following year. The district parent-teacher association continued to advocate for a unified district, and by January 1967, it had secured the support of enough local residents to schedule a referendum for that April. On April 4, the conversion to a unified district was approved with strong voter support, resulting in the formation of "Kenosha Unified School District No. 1" on June 27, 1967.

=== Subsequent history ===
By 1970, KUSD comprised the Bradford and Tremper high schools, five junior high schools, four county schools providing instruction through eighth grade, and 26 elementary schools. After voters rejected bond referendums to build a third high school that year, a high-school level night school was established from September 8, 1971 as a temporary measure to alleviate overcrowding; the program was primarily based at Tremper. From February 3, 1975, the night high school moved to a former University of Wisconsin–Parkside extension building leased to the school district by the city and county of Kenosha.

On April 28, 1975, KUSD established an alternative high school program that incorporated the night high school. The alternative high school, named after Walter Reuther on June 16, opened on September 3. On February 21, 1978, voters approved a bond issue to purchase and convert the Reuther Alternative High facilities to house a full high school; the measure involved the Bradford and Reuther High schools exchanging their facilities. Remodeling at the new Bradford High site began on May 9, 1979, and was largely completed on August 26, 1980, when both schools moved into their new locations. As part of the project, the dilapidated 1891/1907 annex to the former Bradford and new Reuther high school building was demolished in July 1980. In October 1985, administrative offices were consolidated and moved into a new Educational Support Center.

With the local population and student enrollments increasing from the late 1980s, a KUSD planning committee in 1990 recommended numerous school expansion and construction projects, including building a fourth high school by about 1996. In August 1997, LakeView Technology Academy opened as the first primarily manufacturing and technology-focused vocational high school in Wisconsin; the academy was established through partnerships among KUSD, Gateway Technical College, and the Kenosha Area Business Alliance, including others. Following the failure of a September 1996 referendum on constructing a new comprehensive high school, the district proceeded with building Indian Trail Academy, to operate as a small high school providing specialized education. On September 2, 1998, Indian Trail opened as the district's fourth high school and its first magnet high school. From the same date, KUSD officially implemented a middle school educational model following several years of planning.

In February 2008, a referendum on expanding Indian Trail Academy by adding a traditional high school, to alleviate overcrowding at Bradford and Tremper, was approved. Retaining its special-focus academy, Indian Trail opened the comprehensive high school on September 1, 2010. In 2012, KUSD adopted a new logo and dropped the "No. 1" at the end of its name, becoming simply "Kenosha Unified School District." In 2010, the district's enrollment peaked at 23,122 students, subsequently declining due to falling birthrates. KUSD has responded by closing and consolidating schools to reduce budget deficits. In December 2023, as part of a "rightsizing" project which anticipated declining enrollments into the 2030s, the district voted to close Lincoln Middle School and five elementary schools.

== Governance ==
KUSD is governed by a superintendent of schools and a board of education. As of 2026, the superintendent is Jeffrey Weiss, who has served since October 2022. The board of education comprises a president, Carl Bryan; three board officers; and three at-large members.

=== Superintendents ===
- Harold R. Maurer (June–August 1967) (Note: Final superintendent of the City of Kenosha School District from 1949 to 1965, then superintendent of the Joint School District until conversion to a unified school district.)
- Donald W. Smitley (October 1967–June 1970)
- Otto F. Huettner (July 1970–June 1979)
- John Hosmanek (July 1979–April 1989)
- Anthony Bisciglia (April 1989–July 1995)
- Michael Johnson (July 1996–July 2001)
  - Joseph Hentges (interim; July 2001–June 2002)
  - Dan Tenuta (interim; June 2002–March 2003)
- Scott Pierce (April 2003–August 2007)
- Joe Mangi (April 2008–June 2010) (Note: Served as interim superintendent October 1995–July 1996, August 2007–April 2008, and December 2013–July 2014.)
- Michele Hancock (July 2010–November 2013)
- Sue Savaglio-Jarvis (July 2014–June 2021)
  - Beth Ormseth (interim; July 2021–October 2022)
- Jeffrey Weiss (October 2022–present)

== Demographics ==
Composition (2024–25)
- White: 43.8%
- Asian/Pacific Islander: 1.6%
- Hispanic: 32.6%
- Black: 13.9%
- American Indian/Alaska Native: 0.2%
- Multiracial: 7.9%

In the 2024–25 school year, KUSD enrolled approximately 18,315 students; 53.5% of students enrolled were considered economically disadvantaged. 14.1% of students had reported disabilities, while 10% were English learners.

== Schools ==
KUSD encompasses sixteen elementary schools, four middle schools, three high schools, seven choice schools, and an eSchool program. In addition to these, Hillcrest School provides an alternative for expelled middle and high school students who need to address behavioral, as well as academic changes. The schools and their opening dates are listed below.

=== High schools ===
- Mary D. Bradford High School (1849, Red Devils)
- Indian Trail High School and Academy (1998, Tigers; 2010, Hawks)
- George Nelson Tremper High School (1964, Trojans)

=== Middle schools ===
- (John) Bullen Middle School (1969)
- (Gilbert S.) Lance Middle School (1962)
- (Mary Lou) Mahone Middle School (2002)
- (George) Washington Middle School (1920; current building opened in 2004)

=== Elementary schools ===
- Bose Elementary School (1968)
- Brass Community School (2008)
- (Curtis A.) Strange Elementary School (1964)
- Forest Park Elementary School (1956)
- (Michael) Frank Elementary School (1896)
- (Ulysses S.) Grant Elementary School (1924)
- (Lester C.) Grewenow Elementary School (1956) (Note: Established as Sunnyside Elementary in 1956 and renamed July 1, 1979 after its former principal Lester C. Grewenow.)
- (Cordelia) Harvey Elementary School (1961)
- (Thomas B.) Jeffery Elementary School (1969)
- (Charles W.) Nash Elementary School (2007)
- Pleasant Prairie Elementary School (1922; current building opened in 1994)
- Prairie Lane Elementary School (1957)
- (Theodore) Roosevelt Elementary School (1929)
- Somers Elementary School (1961)
- Southport Elementary School (1954)
- (John Greenleaf) Whittier Elementary School (1913)

=== Choice schools ===
- Harborside Academy (Grades 6–12)
- Irene Santos Learning Station (Early Childhood/Prekindergarten)
- Kenosha School of Language (Grades PK-5)
- LakeView K-8 Academy (PK-8)
- LakeView Technology Academy (9–12)
- Reuther Central High School (1975, Bulldogs)
- Ruth Harman Academy (Grades K-8)

=== Specialty School ===
- Hillcrest School (Grades 6–12)

=== Other programs ===
- Early Childhood (Pre-K)
- Even Start (any age)
- Kenosha eSchool (Grades K-12)
- STEP (age 18–21)

=== Former schools ===
School	Opened	Closed as school	Notes
(Gurdin) Gillett Elementary School	March 5, 1900	January 30, 1939	Closed to reduce operating costs. Converted to temporary housing during World War II. Demolished June-July 1953.
Open Air-Orthopedic School	April 17, 1911	January 1962	Open Air School established 1911 near Frank Elementary School. Program moved several times, including into old Bain Elementary building, before settling into new building adjacent to Jefferson Elementary School in 1929, when Open Air-Orthopedic School was established. Program moved to Jane Vernon Elementary School's Orthopedic Wing in 1961 to allow for expansion. 1929 building later used for Jefferson Elementary Annex before closing in 2011 due to redistricting. Kenosha eSchool moved into this building in the fall of 2014 and remained here until June 2024, when it moved out as part of KUSD's Rightsizing Project.
(Reuben) Deming School	January 12, 1899	June 1962	Closed as school and used as district offices until September 1982. Sold to community support organization; served as food pantry and homeless shelter from 1985 to 2017. Demolished 2018.
(John) Hannan Elementary School		June 1969	Final structure built 1910. Utilized as district office space until building closed August 1977. Sold June 1978. Demolished September 9–13, 1985.
Dublin Elementary School		June 1976	Sold May 1977.
Sheridan Road Elementary School	1933	June 1976	Sold June 1977.
(Anton) Weiskopf Elementary School	December 6, 1847	June 1977	Opened as North Ward School in December 1847, later known as North Side School. Moved to larger facilities in 1884, and in 1902, when new building designed by Chandler and Park built. Renamed Anton Weiskopf School when new building opened September 8, 1902. Closed as school and used for district offices until July 1981. Sold November 1987. Converted into apartments in 2019.
Green Bay Road Elementary School		October 1979	Renamed from Lincoln State Graded School in October 1965. Sold 1986.
Berryville Elementary School	1855	June 1980	Final structure opened 1925. Sold February 27, 1991 and subsequently demolished.
Highland Elementary School		September 1983	Final structure opened 1927. After closing, sold 1989.
(Charles) Durkee Elementary School	January 7, 1878	June 10, 2008	Rebuilt and new building opened January 9, 1905. Sold in 2006, then merged with Lincoln Elementary School after 2007–08 school year. Demolished from October 24 through November 2008.
(Abraham) Lincoln Elementary School	September 5, 1916	June 10, 2008	Building opened February 1, 1917. Merged with Durkee Elementary School to form Brass Community School. In September 2008, Kenosha School of Technology-Enhanced Curriculum (KTEC) took up residence in this facility, where it remained until June 2024. Building to be demolished in 2026, and site redeveloped to support operations at current LakeView K-8 Academy.
(Christopher) Columbus Elementary School	April 18, 1910	June 13, 2011	Sold October 2011.
(William) McKinley Middle School	September 12, 1921	June 11, 2012	In September 2014, KTEC was expanded into this facility, renaming the former Lincoln Elementary as KTEC-East and this facility as KTEC-West. Building to be demolished in 2026.
(Woodrow) Wilson Elementary School	September 10, 1953	June 8, 2023	Hillcrest School moved into this facility in 2025.
(Edward) Bain Elementary School/Edward Bain School of Language and Art (EBSOLA)	September 9, 1907	June 12, 2024	Original building closed June 2004, transferred to city November 2005, and demolished March-April 2018. New building opened September 2004, combining Bain Elementary School and Kenosha School of Language, and used until Bain Elementary's closure in June 2024 as part of the Rightsizing Project; building then remodeled for use by Washington Middle School.
(Abraham) Lincoln Middle School	September 5, 1916	June 12, 2024	Original building opened February 1, 1917. Shared with Lincoln Elementary until purpose-built Lincoln Junior High building opened September 3, 1930.. In September 2024, following Lincoln Middle School's closure as part of the Rightsizing Project, both campuses of KTEC consolidated into this building. In January 2025, the KTEC partnership with KUSD was dissolved, and this building became LakeView K-8 Academy.
(Thomas) Jefferson Elementary School	March 12, 1924	June 12, 2024	Closed as part of the Rightsizing Project in 2024.
(William) McKinley Elementary School	September 6, 1950	June 12, 2024	Closed as part of the Rightsizing Project in 2024. Building to be demolished in 2026.
(Jane) Vernon Elementary School	September 6, 1961	June 12, 2024	On opening, incorporated the Orthopedic Elementary School program in a dedicated wing. In the fall of 2012, the Brompton School took up residence in the former Orthopedic Wing. In the fall of 2024, following Vernon's closure as part of the Rightsizing Project, Brompton combined with Dimensions of Learning Academy to form Ruth Harman Academy in the main Jane Vernon building. In addition, the Kenosha eSchool and Early Childhood programs moved into this building, taking up residence in the former Orthopedic Wing.
(Irving F.) Stocker Elementary School	September 1, 1993	June 12, 2024	In the fall of 2024, following Stocker's closure as part of the Rightsizing Project, Kenosha School of Language moved into this facility from its former home at Edward Bain School of Language and Art.

== Music program ==
The Kenosha public school orchestra program starts at the fifth-grade level and continues into high school. The concert and symphony orchestras of the city's high schools present fall and spring concerts. In addition, the Tremper High School Golden Strings ensemble has performed throughout the United States and internationally since the early 1970s.

The Orchestra Festival has been a part of Kenosha history since 1963. Typically held in March each year, it showcases student performances at every level. Each year a guest conductor works with all of the ensembles, and awards are presented for music camps, teacher service and financial support, among other achievements.

The Band-O-Rama is a citywide school concert held annually since the mid-1950s, featuring the Kenosha Unified School District's band program, totaling about 1,700 students in grades 5 through 12. As with the Orchestra Festival, the Band-O-Rama features a guest conductor. The show typically begins with an opening fanfare, followed by the national anthem, after which each grade level is showcased one by one with several selections. At the finale, the massed bands play Sousa's "Stars and Stripes Forever".

== Controversies ==
In 2018, the Kenosha Unified School District settled a lawsuit for $800,000 that had been filed by a transgender male student who had been banned from the boys' restroom. The school district had previously lost in the Seventh U.S. Circuit Court of Appeals.

Schools in the area have been criticized by the American Civil Liberties Union for applying a sexist dress code. Girls have been sent home for wearing tank tops, leggings and yoga pants while sweatpants and basketball shorts for boys were permitted. However, as of 2023 the dress code has changed and all of the previously mentioned are now allowed.
