= Daviyon Nixon =

American football player (born 1998)

Profile
- Position: Defensive end

Personal information
- Born: December 13, 1998 (age 27); Kenosha, Wisconsin, U.S.
- Listed height: 6 ft 3 in (1.91 m)
- Listed weight: 305 lb (138 kg)

Career information
- High school: Indian Trail (Kenosha)
- College: Iowa Western (2017); Iowa (2018–2020)
- NFL draft: 2021: 5th round, 158th overall pick

Career history
- Carolina Panthers (2021–2022); Seattle Seahawks (2022); Miami Dolphins (2024)*; Arlington Renegades (2025)
- * Offseason or practice squad member only

Awards and highlights
- Unanimous All-American (2020); Big Ten Defensive Player of the Year (2020); Big Ten Defensive Lineman of the Year (2020); First-team All-Big Ten (2020)

Career NFL statistics as of 2023
- Total tackles: 15
- Sacks: 0.5
- Stats at Pro Football Reference

Daviyon Nixon (born December 13, 1998) is an American professional football defensive end. He played college football for Iowa Western C.C. and the Iowa Hawkeyes. He was selected by the Carolina Panthers in the fifth round of the 2021 NFL draft.

== Early life ==
Nixon grew up in Kenosha, Wisconsin and attended Indian Trail High School and Academy, where he played basketball and football. He was named first-team All-Southeast Conference and first-team All-State as a senior. Nixon committed to play college football at Iowa over an offer from Purdue, but was not admitted after failing to qualify academically.

== College career ==
Nixon began his collegiate career at Iowa Western Community College. He finished his freshman season with five sacks and nine tackles for loss and was named second-team All-Iowa Community College Athletic Conference. After one season, he qualified academically to play Division I football and committed to Iowa.

Nixon redshirted his first season at Iowa. As a redshirt sophomore, he played in all 13 of the Hawkeyes' games and finished the season with 29 tackles, with 5.5 tackles for loss, and three sacks. Nixon was named first-team All-Big Ten Conference, as well as the Conference Defensive Player of the Year and Defensive Lineman of the Year. As a redshirt junior, he was named a unanimous first-team All-America selection.

== Professional career ==
Pre-draft measurables
| Height | Weight | Arm length | Hand span | 40-yard dash | 10-yard split | 20-yard split | 20-yard shuttle | Three-cone drill | Vertical jump | Broad jump |
|---|---|---|---|---|---|---|---|---|---|---|
| 6 ft 3 1/8 in (1.91 m) | 313 lb (142 kg) | 35 1/8 in (0.89 m) | 9 1/4 in (0.23 m) | 4.86 s | 1.70 s | 2.95 s | 4.71 s | 7.56 s | 28.5 in (0.72 m) | 8 ft 10 in (2.69 m) |
All values from Pro Day

=== Carolina Panthers ===
Nixon was selected by the Carolina Panthers in the fifth round, 158th overall, of the 2021 NFL draft. He signed his four-year rookie contract on May 13, 2021. He was placed on injured reserve on October 28 with a knee injury.

Nixon was waived on September 5, 2022 and re-signed to the practice squad. He was promoted to the active roster on September 27. He was waived again on December 13.

=== Seattle Seahawks ===
On December 21, 2022, Nixon signed with the Seattle Seahawks, but was waived six days later.

=== Miami Dolphins ===
On March 7, 2024, Nixon signed with the Miami Dolphins. He was waived by the Dolphins on June 13.

=== Arlington Renegades ===
On February 10, 2025, Nixon signed with the Arlington Renegades of the United Football League (UFL). He was released on May 20.
