= Civic Center Historic District (Kenosha, Wisconsin) =

Historic district in Wisconsin, United States

- U.S. National Register of Historic Places
- U.S. Historic district
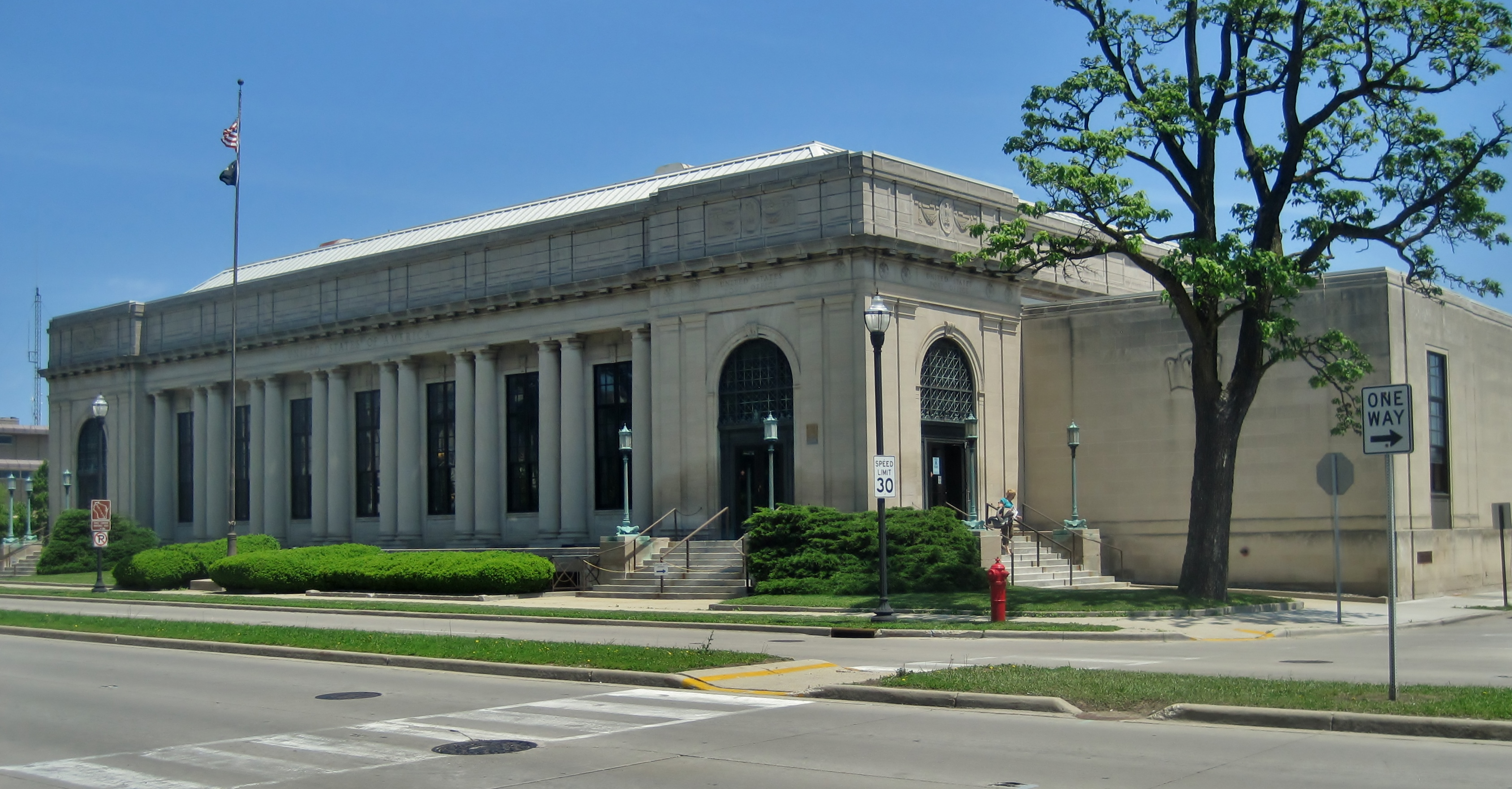
- The United States Post Office (1933)

- Location within Wisconsin Location within the United States
- Location: Roughly bounded by 55th St., 8th Ave., 58th St., and 10th Ave., Kenosha, Wisconsin
- Coordinates: 42°35′4″N 87°49′19″W
- Area: 10 acres (4.0 ha)
- Architect: Charles D. Chubb (Kenosha High School); Lindl, Lesser & Schutte (Kenosha County Courthouse and Jail)
- Architectural style: Classical Revival
- NRHP reference No.: 89000069
- Added to NRHP: July 26, 1989

The Civic Center Historic District is a group of six large Neoclassical Revival buildings around Civic Center Park in Kenosha, Wisconsin, United States, reflecting the city's history as Kenosha County seat.

== History ==
In the 1900s, the City Beautiful movement gained national recognition. As a result, cities like Kenosha, Wisconsin sought to develop aesthetically pleasant town centers. After World War I ended, Kenosha officials appointed a committee to establish a city plan. In 1922, Kenosha citizens voted to approve this plan, part of which was to develop a new town center. Harland Bartholomew was commissioned to submit a city plan, which he submitted in 1925.

Like many centers developed in the wake of City Beautiful, the civic district is largely Neoclassical in design. Kenosha native Joseph Lindl, in association with Charles Lesser and Albert Schutte, designed the Kenosha County Courthouse and Jail, which was completed in 1925. The Kenosha High School, planned by school design specialist Charles D. Chubb, was completed a year later. The Loyal Order of Moose built a clubhouse at the corner of 56th Street and Tenth Avenue. They used the building until 1943; it is now the Kenosha County Administration building, utilized for departments dealing with vital records. The final two buildings of the district were added in 1933. The former United States Post Office, constructed in 1909 in another part of the city, was moved to the civic district. Designed by Supervising Architect James Knox Taylor, the building was re-purposed as the Kenosha Public Museum. The last building constructed in the district was a new post office on Sheridan Road.

On July 26, 1989, the National Park Service recognized the district with a listing on the National Register of Historic Places. The courthouse and jail was listed individually in 1982.
