= LakeView Technology Academy =

Location
- 5533 26th Avenue; Kenosha, Wisconsin 53140; United States; 42°35′3″N 87°50′24″W

Information
- Type: Vocational school
- Established: 1997
- School district: Kenosha Unified School District
- Principal: Bethany Ormseth
- Teaching staff: 16.00 (FTE)
- Grades: 9-12
- Enrollment: 391 (2023-2024)
- Student to teacher ratio: 24.44
- Colors: Teal, Navy, and White
- Mascot: Legend Wolf
- Website: www.kusd.edu/lakeview/

LakeView Technology Academy is a vocational high school in the Kenosha Unified School District (KUSD) in Kenosha, Wisconsin. It serves students grades 9 to 12 from all across KUSD with a focus on STEM education.

== History ==
LakeView opened in the fall of 1997 as a response to overcrowding in KUSD. The school also has partnerships with the Kenosha Area Business Alliance and Gateway Technical College. LakeView is ranked the 234th best high school in the nation, making it the 2nd best in Wisconsin.

In June 2022, the School Board of the Kenosha Unified School District approved the relocation of LakeView to the former location of the Chrysler plant in Kenosha. The new building was completed in January 2025, with classes moving to the new building in time for the second semester.

== Academics ==
Students at LakeView have the opportunity to earn college credits in high school due to the school's partnership with Gateway. Many of these dual credit (college credit) classes are offered at the school, as well as AP level courses. PE and core classes are still provided by the school with all core courses being honors level. Students who wish to enroll in music can take those classes at Harborside Academy, while students who wish to participate in sports can do so at their boundary high school.

== Extracurricular activities ==
LakeView offers many activities & clubs for students to participate in.

- African American Youth Initiative
- Book Club
- Bowling
- Board Game Club
- Chess Club
- Debate Club
- Environmental Club
- Gay-Straight Alliance
- HOSA
- National Honor Society
- Prom Committee
- Radio Club
- Rocket Club
- ROV (Remote Operated Vehicle)
- SkillsUSA
- Student Government
- STEAM (Tech/Art Club)
- Young Women's Forum
