= Kenosha County Courthouse and Jail =

- U.S. National Register of Historic Places
- U.S. Historic district – Contributing property
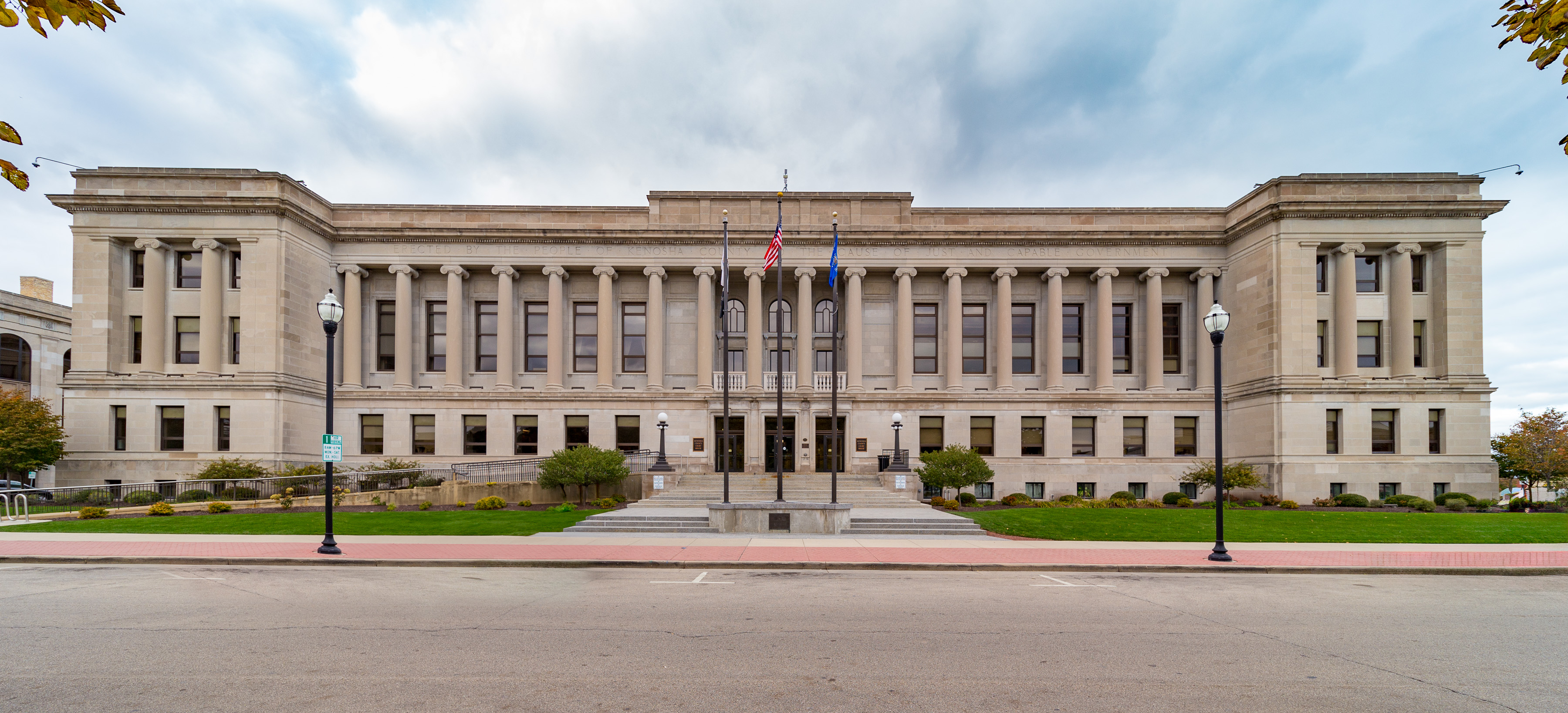
- Kenosha County Courthouse

- Location within Wisconsin Location within the United States
- Interactive map showing the location for Kenosha County Courthouse and Jail
- Location: 912 56th St. Kenosha, Wisconsin
- Coordinates: 42°35′6″N 87°49′23″W
- Architect: Joseph Lindl/Albert Lesser/Charles Schutte
- Architectural style: Neoclassical
- Part of: Civic Center Historic District (ID89000069)
- NRHP reference No.: 82000677
- Added to NRHP: March 9, 1982

The Kenosha County Courthouse and Jail is located in Kenosha, Wisconsin in the United States. The site was added to the National Register of Historic Places in 1982.

== Description ==
The first Kenosha County Courthouse was built in 1850 when Kenosha Country split from Racine County. By 1870, this building proved too small, and a new courthouse was established. Fifteen years later, a third courthouse was built. The present County Courthouse and Jail in Kenosha, Wisconsin was constructed from 1923 to 1925 in the Neoclassical style. It was part of Harland Bartholomew's initial plan to redesign the city of Kenosha with City Beautiful movement influence. Land was selected by the Kenosha Board of Supervisors in 1922, coinciding with the shift in municipal policy to a council-manager plan. The jail was later used as the district attorney's offices. On March 9, 1982, the buildings were recognized by the National Park Service with a listing on the National Register of Historic Places. When the Civic Center Historic District was established seven years later, the courthouse and jail were listed as a contributing property.

== Architecture ==
The buildings are faced with gray Indiana limestone in an ashlar motif. A cornice decorates the building above the first floor. The three-story courthouse building sits on a raised basement. The main facade of the second and third stories are decorated with a colonnade of eighteen free-standing Ionic order columns. Two-story modern windows are found between the columns, except above the main entrance. The entrance instead has a recessed balcony with round-arched windows and a balustrade. The three-story jail features similar windows, although these are original to the building.
