= 34th Wisconsin Legislature =

Wisconsin legislative term for 1881

←	33rd	35th	→
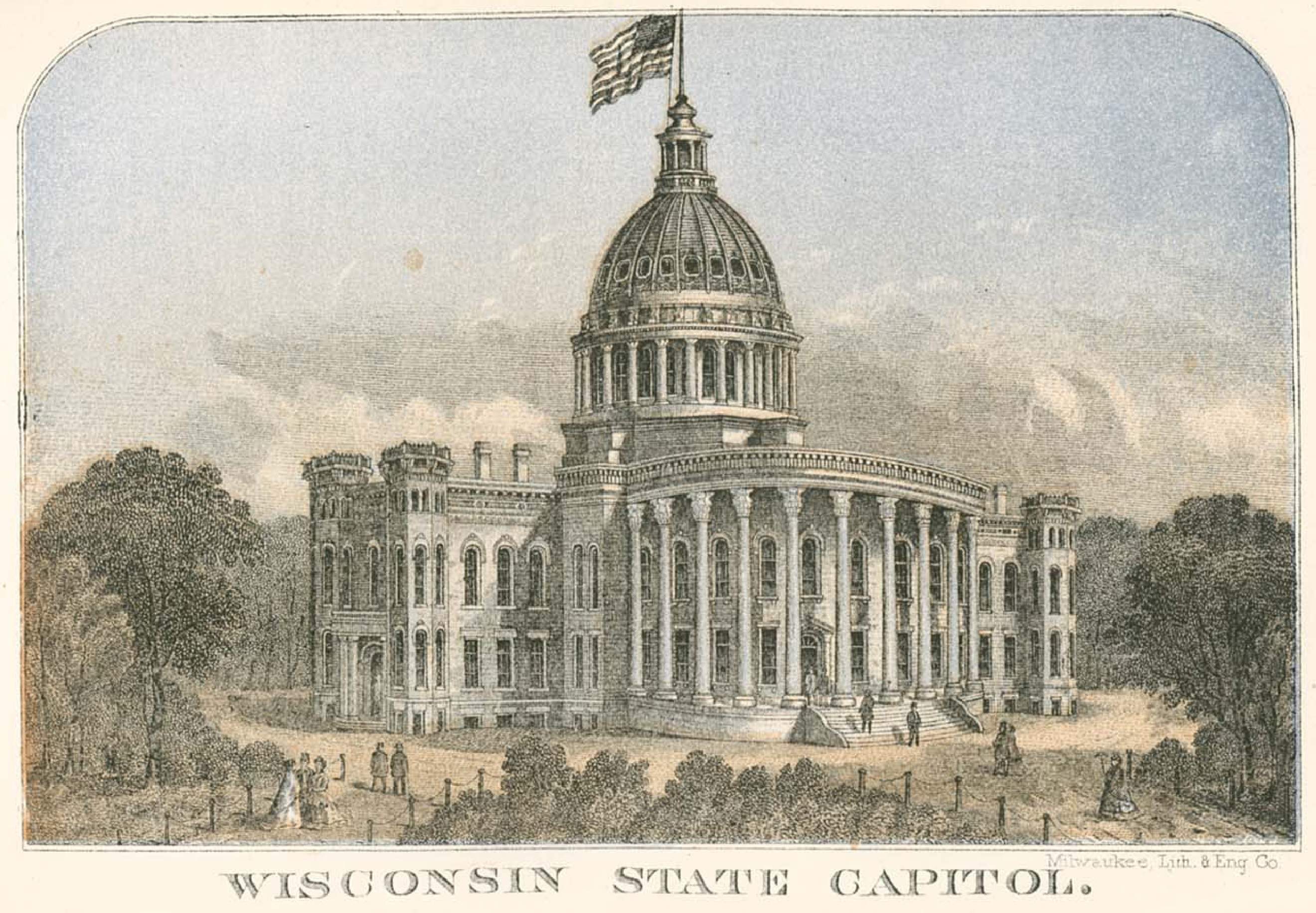
- Wisconsin State Capitol, 1863

Overview
- Legislative body: Wisconsin Legislature
- Meeting place: Wisconsin State Capitol
- Term: January 3, 1881 – January 2, 1882
- Election: November 2, 1880

Senate
- Members: 33
- Senate President: James M. Bingham (R)
- President pro tempore: Thomas B. Scott (R)
- Party control: Republican

Assembly
- Members: 100
- Assembly Speaker: Ira B. Bradford (R)
- Party control: Republican

Sessions
- 1st: January 12, 1881 – April 4, 1881

The Thirty-Fourth Wisconsin Legislature convened from January 12, 1881, to April 4, 1881, in regular session.

This was the first legislative session after the 1880 United States census, and—as prescribed by the Wisconsin Constitution—this legislature attempted to pass a redistricting law. For the first time, the legislature failed in this task due to a technical problem with the proposed legislation—they forgot to include the town of Ridgeway, in Iowa County. The Governor vetoed the legislation due to this technical fault. Since the legislature had already adjourned for the year, it was considered too late to complete redistricting before the 1881 election.

Senators representing odd-numbered districts were newly elected for this session and were serving the first year of a two-year term. Assembly members were elected to a one-year term. Assembly members and odd-numbered senators were elected in the general election of November 2, 1880. Senators representing even-numbered districts were serving the second year of their two-year term, having been elected in the general election held on November 4, 1879.

The governor of Wisconsin during this entire term was Republican William E. Smith, of Milwaukee County, serving the second year of his second two-year term, having won re-election in the 1879 Wisconsin gubernatorial election.

== Major events ==
- January 4, 1881: Joseph E. Darbellay was elected to the Wisconsin State Assembly from the Kewaunee County district to fill the vacancy caused by the resignation of John Milton Read.
- January 26, 1881: Philetus Sawyer elected United States Senator by the Wisconsin Legislature in Joint Session.
- February 24, 1881: Wisconsin's senior United States Senator Matthew H. Carpenter died of kidney disease in Washington, D.C.
- March 4, 1881: Inauguration of James A. Garfield as the 20th President of the United States.
- March 13, 1881: Tsar Alexander II of Russia was assassinated in Saint Petersburg.
- March 14, 1881: Angus Cameron elected United States Senator by the Wisconsin Legislature in Joint Session.
- April 4, 1881: Wisconsin Governor William E. Smith vetoed the proposed legislative redistricting act due to a technical flaw in the legislation.
- May 21, 1881: American Red Cross was founded at Dansville, New York.
- July 2, 1881: U.S. President James A. Garfield was shot by an assassin in Washington, D.C.
- September 19, 1881: U.S. President James A. Garfield died of an infected gunshot wound.
- September 20, 1881: Inauguration of Chester A. Arthur as the 21st President of the United States.
- November 8, 1881: Jeremiah McLain Rusk elected Governor of Wisconsin.
- November 8, 1881: At the state's general election, Wisconsin voters approved an amendment to the Constitution of Wisconsin. The amendment doubled the terms of Wisconsin legislators—Assembly terms went from 1 year to 2 years; Senate terms went from 2 years to 4 years. The amendment also adjusted the frequency of legislative sessions from annual to biennial, with new sessions beginning in odd-numbered years.

== Major legislation ==
- March 19, 1881: An Act to provide for more light on various subjects, 1881 Act 110. Directed the governor to implement electric lighting in the Wisconsin capitol building.
- April 2, 1881: An Act relating to state officers and making the railroad commissioner and commissioner of insurance elective, as other state officers, and prescribing their duties and salary, and amendatory of sections one hundred and twenty-eight and one thousand nine hundred and sixty-seven of the revised statutes, and to repeal section one thousand seven hundred and ninety-two of the revised statutes, and amendatory of section six of chapter two hundred and forty of the laws of 1880, 1881 Act 300. Converted the offices of insurance commissioner and railroad commissioner to statewide elected offices, rather than gubernatorial appointees.
- Joint Resolution amending sections number four, five, eleven and twenty-one, article four of the constitution of the state of Wisconsin, 1881 Joint Resolution 7. This was the required second legislative resolution supporting the amendment to change the length of legislative terms. The amendment was ratified by voters in the November 1881 general election.
- Joint Resolution proposing amendments to section four of article six, section twelve of article seven, and section one of article thirteen of the constitution of the state of Wisconsin, so as to provide for biennial general elections, 1881 Joint Resolution 16. Proposed changes to the state constitution to bring all terms for county officers into uniformity, with elections taking place in even-numbered years. This was the first legislative approval for this amendment, a second legislative approval was passed in 1882, and the amendment was ratified by the voters in the November 1882 general election.

== Party summary ==
=== Senate summary ===
Senate partisan composition Democratic: 9 seats Republican: 24 seats

	Party (Shading indicates majority caucus)		Total	
	Dem.	Rep.	Total	Vacant
End of previous Legislature	8	25	33	0
1st Session	9	24	33	0
Final voting share	27.27%	72.73%		
Beginning of the next Legislature	10	23	33	0

=== Assembly summary ===
Assembly partisan composition Democratic: 21 seats Republican: 79 seats

	Party (Shading indicates majority caucus)				Total	
	Dem.	Gbk.	Ind.	Rep.	Total	Vacant
End of previous Legislature	28	2	0	70	100	0
1st Session	21	0	0	79	100	0
Final voting share	21%			79%		
Beginning of the next Legislature	34	0	2	64	100	0

== Sessions ==
- 1st Regular session: January 12, 1881 – April 4, 1881

== Leaders ==
=== Senate leadership ===
- President of the Senate: James M. Bingham (R)
- President pro tempore: Thomas B. Scott (R)

=== Assembly leadership ===
- Speaker of the Assembly: Ira B. Bradford (R)

== Members ==
=== Members of the Senate ===
Members of the Senate for the Thirty-Fourth Wisconsin Legislature:

Senate partisan representation Democratic: 9 seats Republican: 24 seats

Dist.	Counties	Senator	Residence	Party
01	Door, Kewaunee, Langlade, Marinette, Oconto, & Shawano	William A. Ellis	Peshtigo	Rep.
02	Brown	David M. Kelly	Green Bay	Rep.
03	Racine	Albert L. Phillips	Racine	Rep.
04	Crawford & Vernon	Ormsby B. Thomas	Prairie du Chien	Rep.
05	Milwaukee (Northern Part)	Isaac W. Van Schaick	Milwaukee	Rep.
06	Milwaukee (Southern Part)	George H. Paul	Milwaukee	Dem.
07	Milwaukee (Central Part)	Edward B. Simpson	Milwaukee	Rep.
08	Kenosha & Walworth	Joseph V. Quarles	Kenosha	Rep.
09	Green Lake, Marquette, & Waushara	James F. Wiley	Hancock	Rep.
10	Waukesha	Richard Weaver	Lisbon	Dem.
11	Chippewa, Clark, Lincoln, Price, Taylor, & Wood	Thomas B. Scott	Grand Rapids	Rep.
12	Green & Lafayette	John W. Blackstone	Shullsburg	Rep.
13	Dodge	Arthur K. Delaney	Mayville	Dem.
14	Juneau & Sauk	Edwin E. Woodman	Baraboo	Rep.
15	Manitowoc	Joseph Rankin	Manitowoc	Dem.
16	Grant	George W. Ryland	Lancaster	Rep.
17	Rock	Hamilton Richardson	Janesville	Rep.
18	Fond du Lac (Western Part)	George E. Sutherland	Ripon	Rep.
19	Winnebago	Joseph B. Hamilton	Neenah	Rep.
20	Sheboygan & Eastern Fond du Lac	Patrick H. Smith	Plymouth	Dem.
21	Marathon, Portage, & Waupaca	Charles F. Crosby	Wausau	Rep.
22	Calumet & Outagamie	Benjamin F. Carter	Harrison	Dem.
23	Jefferson	Frederick Kusel	Watertown	Dem.
24	Ashland, Barron, Bayfield, Burnett, Douglas, Polk, & St. Croix	Sam S. Fifield	Ashland	Rep.
25	Dane (Eastern Part)	George B. Burrows	Madison	Rep.
26	Dane (Western Part)	Matthew Anderson	Cross Plains	Dem.
27	Adams & Columbia	Gilbert E. McKeeby	Lodi	Rep.
28	Iowa & Richland	Joseph McGrew	Richland	Rep.
29	Buffalo, Pepin, & Trempealeau	Augustus F. Finkelnburg	Fountain City	Rep.
30	Dunn, Eau Claire, & Pierce	Michael Griffin	Eau Claire	Rep.
31	La Crosse	Merrick Wing	La Crosse	Rep.
32	Jackson & Monroe	William T. Price	Black River Falls	Rep.
33	Ozaukee & Washington	George F. Hunt	West Bend	Dem.

=== Members of the Assembly ===
Members of the Assembly for the Thirty-Fourth Wisconsin Legislature:

Assembly partisan composition Democratic: 21 seats Republican: 79 seats

Senate District	County	Dist.	Representative	Party	Residence
27	Adams		Solon Pierce	Rep.	Friendship
24	Ashland, Barron, Bayfield, Burnett, Douglas, & Polk		George D. McDill	Rep.	Osceola
02	Brown	1	Benjamin Fontaine	Rep.	Green Bay
02	Brown	2	James Rasmussen	Rep.	Fort Howard
02	Brown	3	Maurice B. Brennan	Dem.	Morrison
29	Buffalo & Pepin	1	Richard R. Kempter	Rep.	Alma
29	Buffalo & Pepin	2	George Tarrant Sr.	Rep.	Durand
22	Calumet		Casper Petersen	Dem.	New Holstein
11	Chippewa & Price		James A. Taylor	Dem.	Chippewa Falls
11	Clark, Lincoln, Taylor & Wood		Myron H. McCord	Rep.	Jenny
27	Columbia	1	William T. Parry	Rep.	Portage
27	Columbia	2	Evan W. Lloyd	Rep.	Cambria
04	Crawford		Atley Peterson	Rep.	Soldiers Grove
26	Dane	1	Samuel J. Coldwell	Dem.	Mazomanie
25	Dane	2	Louis K. Luse	Rep.	Stoughton
25	Dane	3	Henry B. Howe	Rep.	Cottage Grove
13	Dodge	1	John Steele	Dem.	Ashippun
13	Dodge	2	William Liscow	Dem.	Iron Ridge
13	Dodge	3	George Jess	Rep.	Waupun
13	Dodge	4	Edward C. McFetridge	Rep.	Beaver Dam
01	Door		Edward S. Minor	Rep.	Fish Creek
30	Dunn		George H. Chamberlin	Rep.	Rock Creek
30	Eau Claire		Ira B. Bradford	Rep.	Augusta
18	Fond du Lac	1	James E. Gee	Dem.	Brandon
18	Fond du Lac	2	Benjamin H. Bettis	Rep.	Waupun
18	Fond du Lac	3	John F. Ware	Rep.	Fond du Lac
20	Fond du Lac	4	Fred Konz	Dem.	Marshfield
16	Grant	1	James Cabanis	Rep.	Smelser
16	Grant	2	Henry S. Keene	Rep.	Lancaster
16	Grant	3	Edward I. Kidd	Rep.	Millville
12	Green	1	Cyrus Troy	Rep.	Monticello
12	Green	2	Burr Sprague	Rep.	Brodhead
09	Green Lake		William Paddock	Rep.	Markesan
28	Iowa	1	Melancthon J. Briggs	Dem.	Dodgeville
28	Iowa	2	Jefferson Rewey	Rep.	Mifflin
32	Jackson		Alvin S. Trow	Rep.	Merrillan
23	Jefferson	1	Humphrey E. Humphrey	Dem.	Ixonia
23	Jefferson	2	John D. Bullock	Rep.	Johnson Creek
23	Jefferson	3	Samuel A. Craig	Dem.	Fort Atkinson
14	Juneau	1	Thaddeus K. Dunn	Rep.	Wonewoc
14	Juneau	2	John T. Kingston	Rep.	Necedah
08	Kenosha		Walter Maxwell	Rep.	Somers
01	Kewaunee		Joseph E. Darbellay	Dem.	Kewaunee
31	La Crosse		John Bradley	Rep.	Bangor
11	Lafayette	1	Albert O. Chamberlain	Rep.	Darlington
11	Lafayette	2	Thomas Bainbridge	Rep.	Benton
15	Manitowoc	1	Thomas Gleeson	Dem.	Rockland
15	Manitowoc	2	Ira P. Smith	Dem.	Mishicot
15	Manitowoc	3	Charles E. Estabrook	Rep.	Manitowoc
21	Marathon		John Ringle	Dem.	Wausau
09	Marquette		C. F. Roskie	Ind.R.	Montello
05	Milwaukee	1	Ashbel K. Shepard	Rep.	Milwaukee
07	Milwaukee	2	Otto Laverrenz	Rep.	Milwaukee
07	Milwaukee	3	Edward Keogh	Dem.	Milwaukee
07	Milwaukee	4	Eschines P. Matthews	Rep.	Milwaukee
06	Milwaukee	5	Thomas M. Corbett	Rep.	Milwaukee
05	Milwaukee	6	Henry Herzer	Rep.	Milwaukee
07	Milwaukee	7	William S. Stanley	Rep.	Milwaukee
06	Milwaukee	8	Theodor O. Hartmann	Rep.	Milwaukee
05	Milwaukee	9	Luther F. Gilson	Rep.	Milwaukee
05	Milwaukee	10	William Pierron	Rep.	Milwaukee
06	Milwaukee	11	David J. Price	Rep.	Bay View
32	Monroe	1	William J. Austin	Rep.	Leon
32	Monroe	2	John O'Brien	Rep.	Wilton
01	Langlade, Marinette, Oconto & Shawano		Ernst Funke	Rep.	Oconto
22	Outagamie	1	Henry Clay Sloan	Dem.	Appleton
22	Outagamie	2	James McMurdo	Rep.	Hortonville
33	Ozaukee		Charles G. Meyer	Ind.D.	Port Washington
30	Pierce		Franklin L. Gilson	Rep.	Ellsworth
21	Portage		James E. Rogers	Rep.	Stevens Point
03	Racine	1	Norton J. Field	Rep.	Racine
03	Racine	2	Sidney A. Sage	Rep.	Western Union Junction
28	Richland	1	Birney M. Jarvis	Rep.	Cazenovia
28	Richland	2	John H. Case	Rep.	Eagle
17	Rock	1	Martin V. Pratt	Rep.	Evansville
17	Rock	2	Franklin S. Lawrence	Rep.	Janesville
17	Rock	3	James Menzies	Rep.	Harmony
14	Sauk	1	Ephraim Blakeslee	Rep.	Ironton
14	Sauk	2	Thomas Gillespie	Rep.	Delton
20	Sheboygan	1	August Selsemeyer	Dem.	Howards Grove
20	Sheboygan	2	Maurice D. Fuller	Rep.	Plymouth
20	Sheboygan	3	Roswell H. Tripp	Rep.	Lima
24	St. Croix		Merton W. Herrick	Rep.	Hudson
29	Trempealeau		Peder Ekern	Rep.	Pigeon Falls
04	Vernon	1	Torger Juve	Rep.	Utica
04	Vernon	2	Allen Rusk	Rep.	Liberty
08	Walworth	1	William Meadows	Rep.	Lyons
08	Walworth	2	Dwight B. Barnes	Rep.	Delavan
08	Walworth	3	Lindsey J. Smith	Rep.	Troy
33	Washington	1	John F. Schwalbach	Dem.	Germantown
33	Washington	2	Joseph W. Holehouse	Dem.	Barton
10	Waukesha	1	John Lins	Rep.	Eagle
10	Waukesha	2	John E. Seabold	Rep.	Menomonee Falls
21	Waupaca	1	Sewall A. Phillips	Rep.	Royalton
21	Waupaca	2	Charles A. Davis	Rep.	Bear Creek
09	Waushara		Charles W. Moors	Rep.	Hancock
19	Winnebago	1	William Wall	Rep.	Oshkosh
19	Winnebago	2	Selden M. Bronson	Rep.	Menasha
19	Winnebago	3	George H. Buckstaff	Rep.	Oshkosh
19	Winnebago	4	Thomas J. Bowles	Rep.	Utica

== Employees ==
=== Senate employees ===
- Chief Clerk: Charles E. Bross
  - Assistant Clerk: Charles N. Herreid
  - Bookkeeper: Oliver Munson
  - Engrossing Clerk: John P. Mitchell
  - Enrolling Clerk: L. J. Burlingame
  - Transcribing Clerk: C. Ingersoll
  - Proofreader: Henry Eduard Legler
  - Clerk for the Judiciary Committee: Charles Simeon Taylor
  - Clerk for the Committee on Enrolled Bills: R. B. Blackstone
  - Document Clerk: Frank Hutson
- Sergeant-at-Arms: W. W. Baker
  - Assistant Sergeant-at-Arms: Charles A. Langridge
- Postmaster: J. L. Thwing
  - Assistant Postmaster: L. E. Spencer
- Gallery Attendant: J. J. Marshall
- Doorkeepers:
  - F. O. Janzen
  - M. Quinn
  - F. R. Sebenthal
  - D. J. F. Murphy
- Porter: O. L. Wright
- Night Watch: A. J. Marsh
- Janitor: Ole Stephenson
- President's Messenger: Ralph Irish
- Chief Clerk's Messenger: J. G. Hyland
- Messengers:
  - Perry Carrell
  - William Burnett
  - John L. Bohm
  - Charles Bucey
  - Albert Fontaine
  - George Kinney

=== Assembly employees ===
- Chief Clerk: John E. Eldred
  - 1st Assistant Clerk: J. F. A. Williams
    - 2nd Assistant Clerk: Peter Philippi
  - Bookkeeper: J. T. Huntington
  - Engrossing Clerk: P. H. Swift
  - Enrolling Clerk: George E. Weatherby
  - Transcribing Clerk: Francis Stirn
  - Proof Reader: Fred W. Coon
- Sergeant-at-Arms: George W. Church
  - Assistant Sergeant-at-Arms: J. B. Perry
- Postmaster: W. W. Sturtevant
  - Assistant Postmaster: George Slingsby
- Doorkeepers:
  - R. N. Potter
  - Charles Rediske
  - W. L. Peterson
  - Darwin C. Pavey
- Gallery Attendant: L. T. Stohland
- Night Watch: Lonis J. Neiman
- Wash Room Attendant: Frank Lynch
- Messengers:
  - Eddie Cavanaugh
  - Thomas Gillespie
  - Thomas Wilkinson
  - William A. Price
  - Hugh Edwards
  - James Daley
  - Fred Moll
  - Hayes Selden
  - Louis E. Bainbridge
  - Thomas Bullock
  - R. G. Thomas
  - Frederick G. Isenring
