= Wisconsin's 15th Senate district =

American legislative district in southern Wisconsin

Wisconsin's 15th State Senate district
- 2024 map defined in 2023 Wisc. Act 94; 2022 map defined in Johnson v. Wisconsin Elections Commission; 2011 map was defined in 2011 Wisc. Act 43 composed of Assembly districts 43, 44, and 45
Senator
Mark Spreitzer; D–Beloit
since January 3, 2023 (3 years, 55 days)
- Demographics: 82.79% White; 5.35% Black; 7.84% Hispanic; 1.76% Asian; 1.93% Native American; 0.12% Hawaiian/Pacific Islander
- Population (2020) • Voting age: 178,585; 139,484
- Website: Official website
- Notes: Southern Wisconsin

The 15th Senate district of Wisconsin is one of 33 districts in the Wisconsin Senate. Located in southern Wisconsin, the district comprises most of Rock County and parts of northwest Walworth County and southern Jefferson County. It includes the cities of Janesville, Beloit, Edgerton, Evansville, Milton, and Whitewater.

== Current elected officials ==
Mark Spreitzer is the senator representing the 15th district since January 2023. He previously served in the State Assembly, representing the 45th Assembly district from 2015 to 2023.

Each Wisconsin State Senate district is composed of three Wisconsin State Assembly districts. The 15th Senate district comprises the 43rd, 44th, and 45th Assembly districts. The current representatives of those districts are:

- Assembly District 43: Brienne Brown (D–Whitewater)
- Assembly District 44: Ann Roe (D–Janesville)
- Assembly District 45: Clinton Anderson (D–Beloit)

The 15th Senate district, in its current borders, crosses three different congressional districts. The portion of the district in Jefferson County falls within Wisconsin's 5th congressional district, which is represented by U.S. Representative Scott L. Fitzgerald; the portion in Walworth County and the cities of Janesville and Milton and the eastern part of Rock County fall within Wisconsin's 1st congressional district, which is represented by U.S. Representative Bryan Steil; the remainder of the district, in the western half of Rock county, falls within Wisconsin's 2nd congressional district, which is represented by U.S. Representative Mark Pocan.

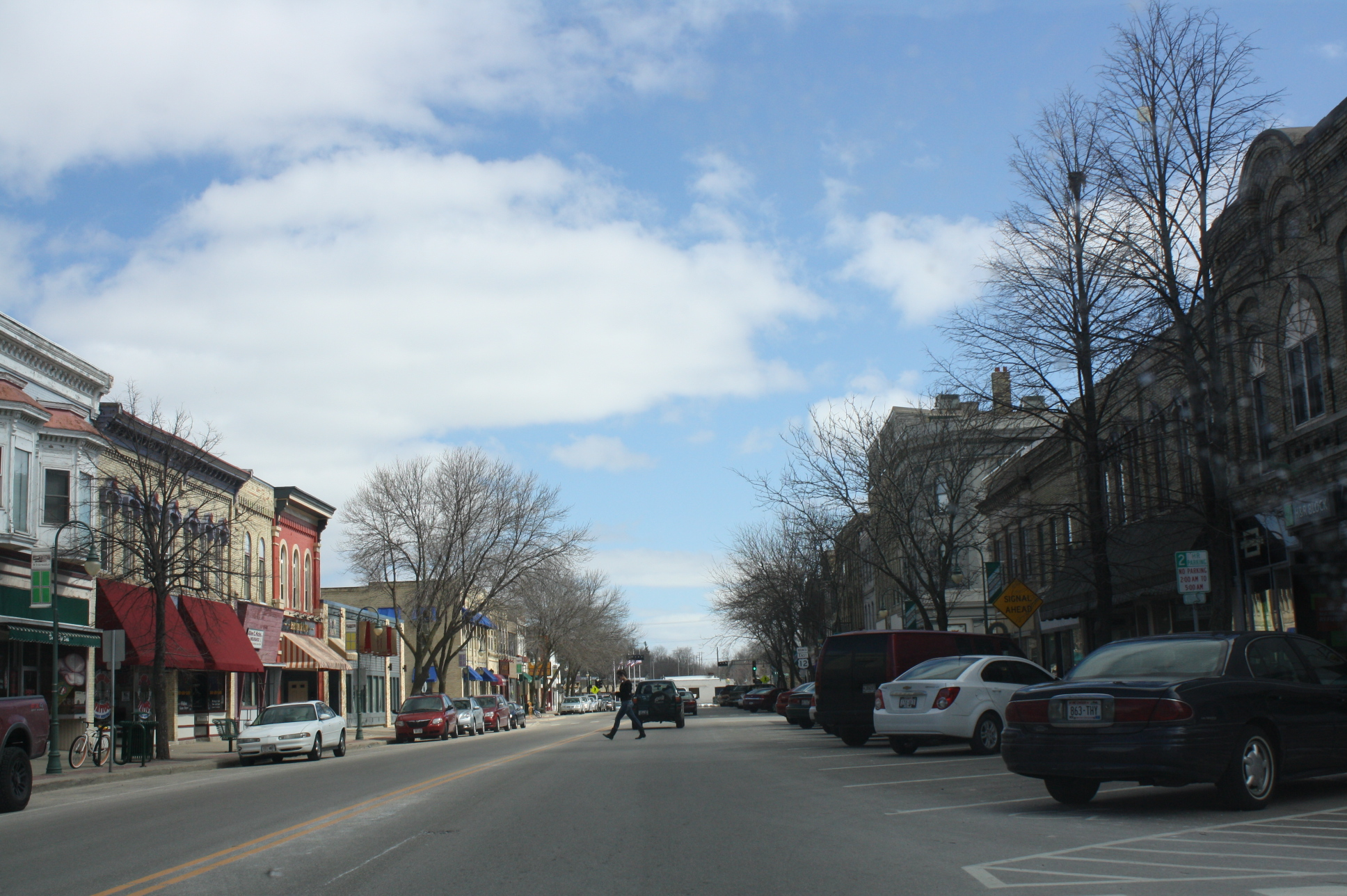
Main Street in downtown Whitewater

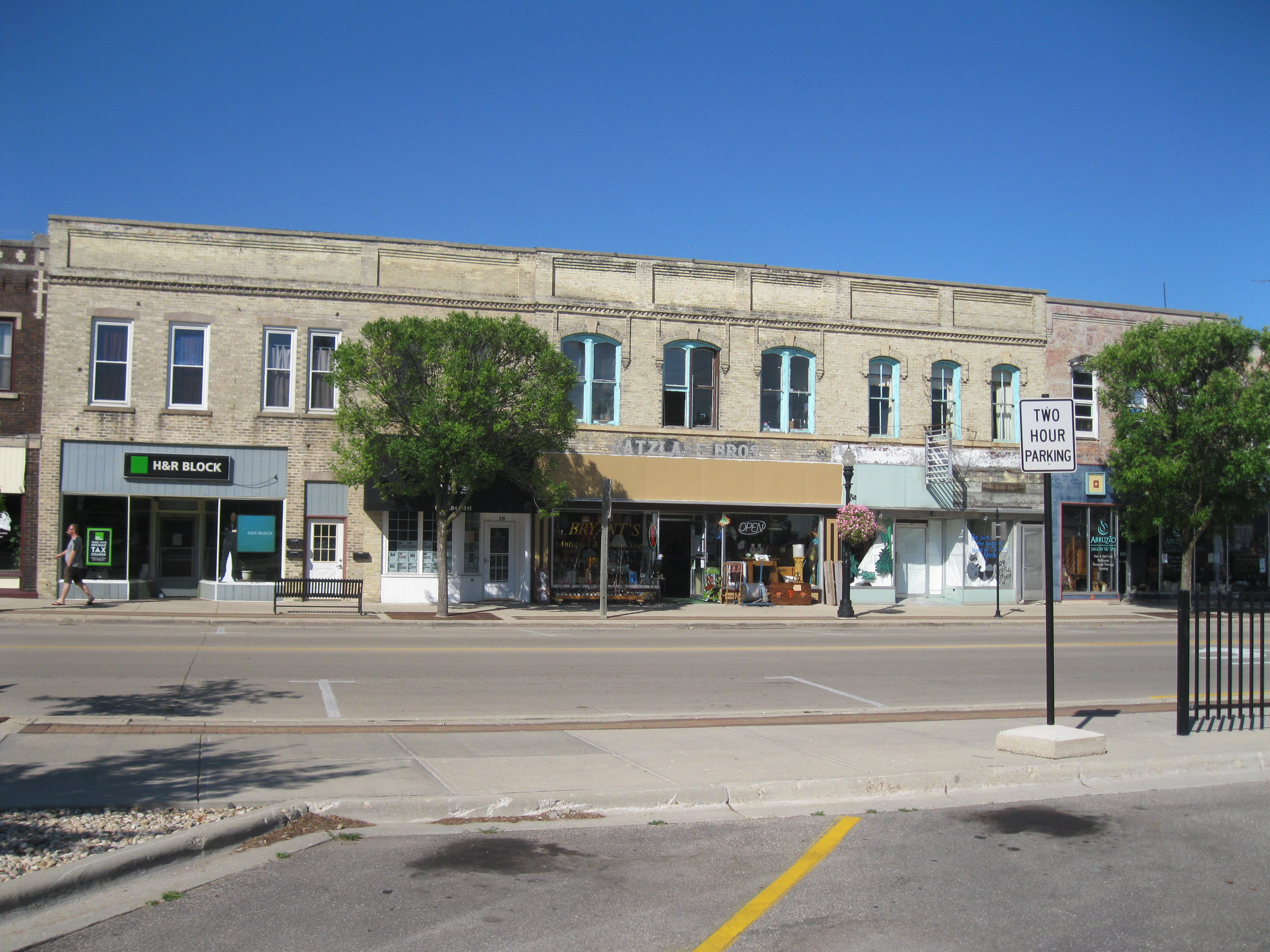
Fulton Street Historic District in Edgerton

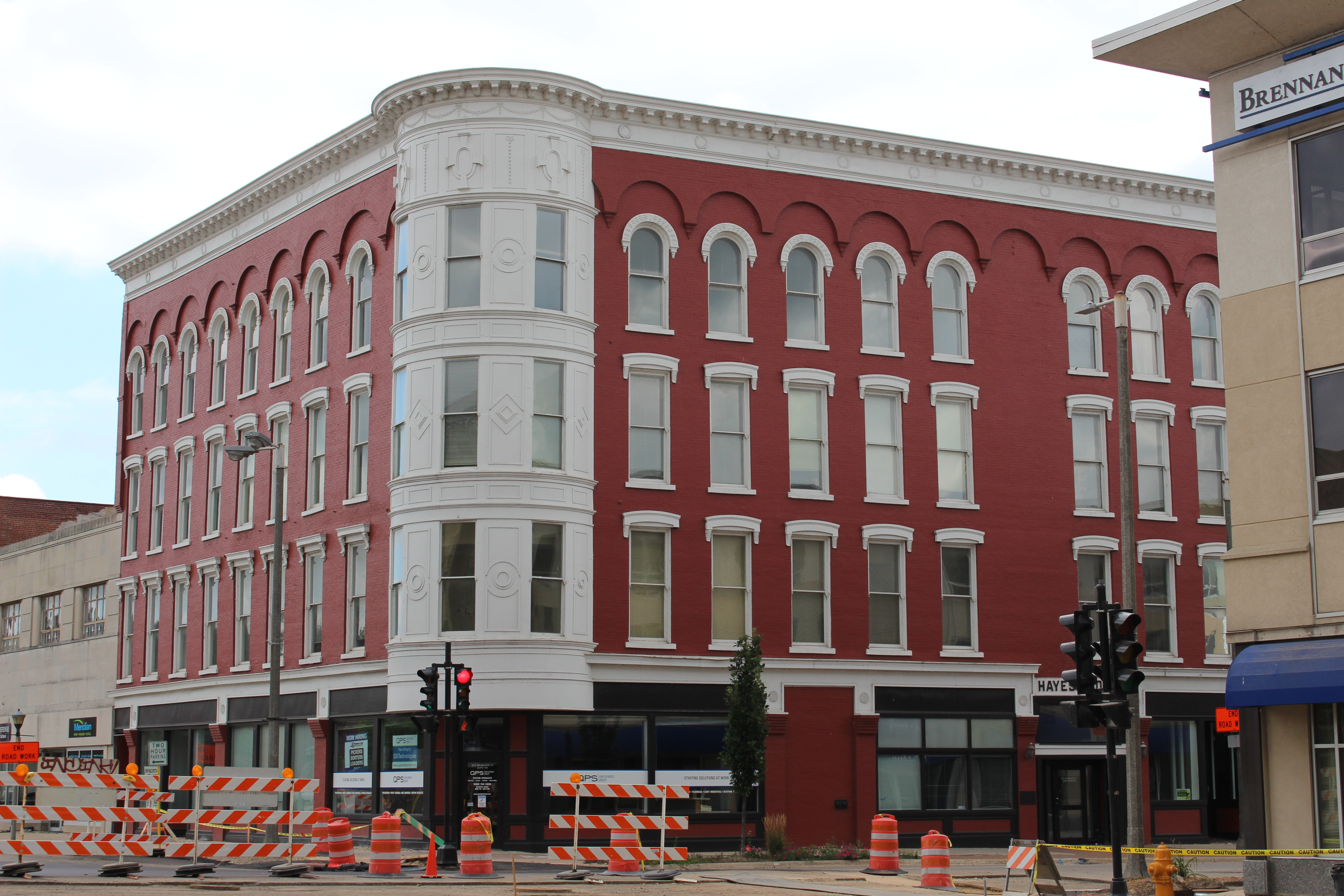
Lappin-Hayes Block in downtown Janesville

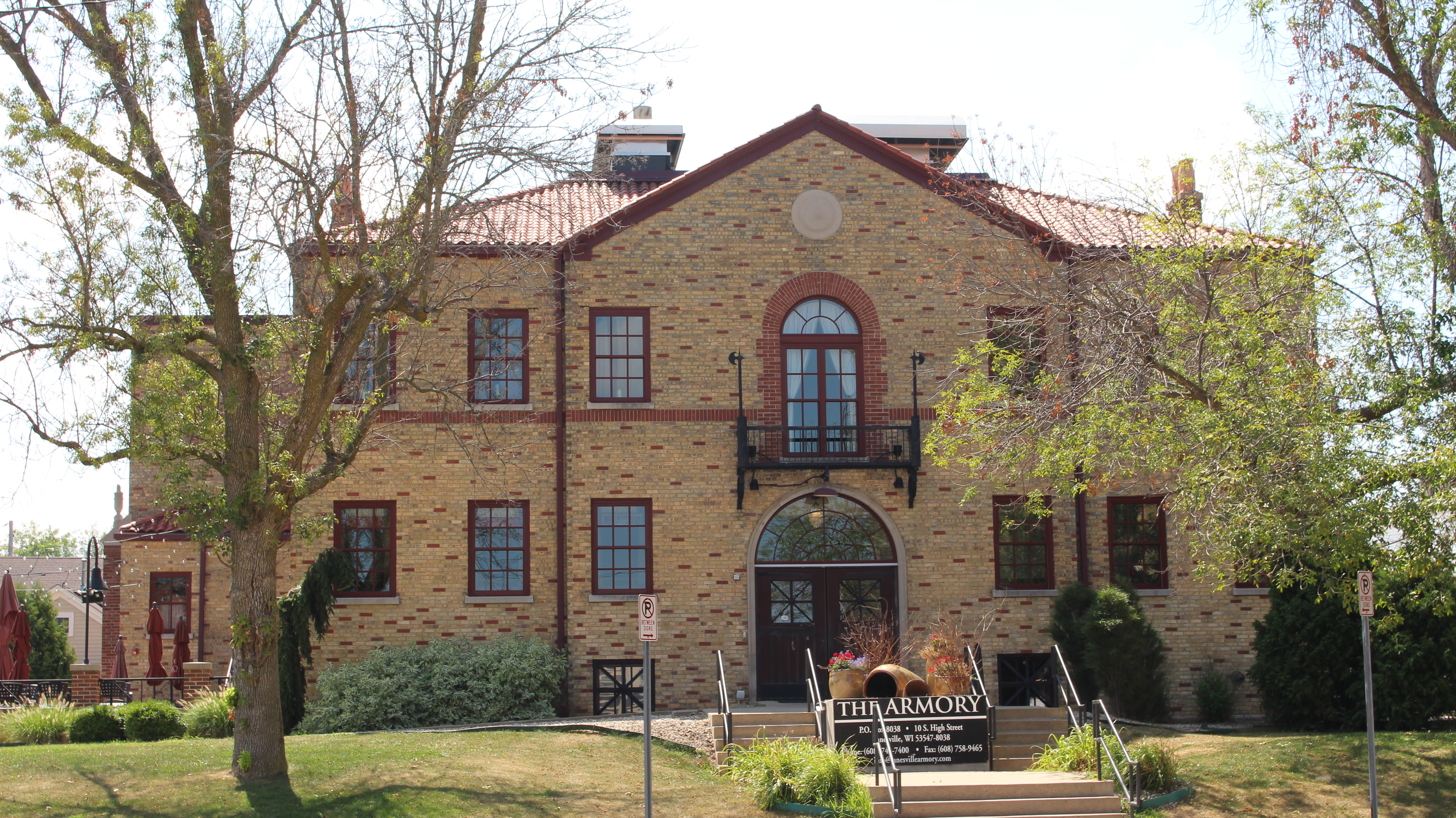
Historic Janesville Armory

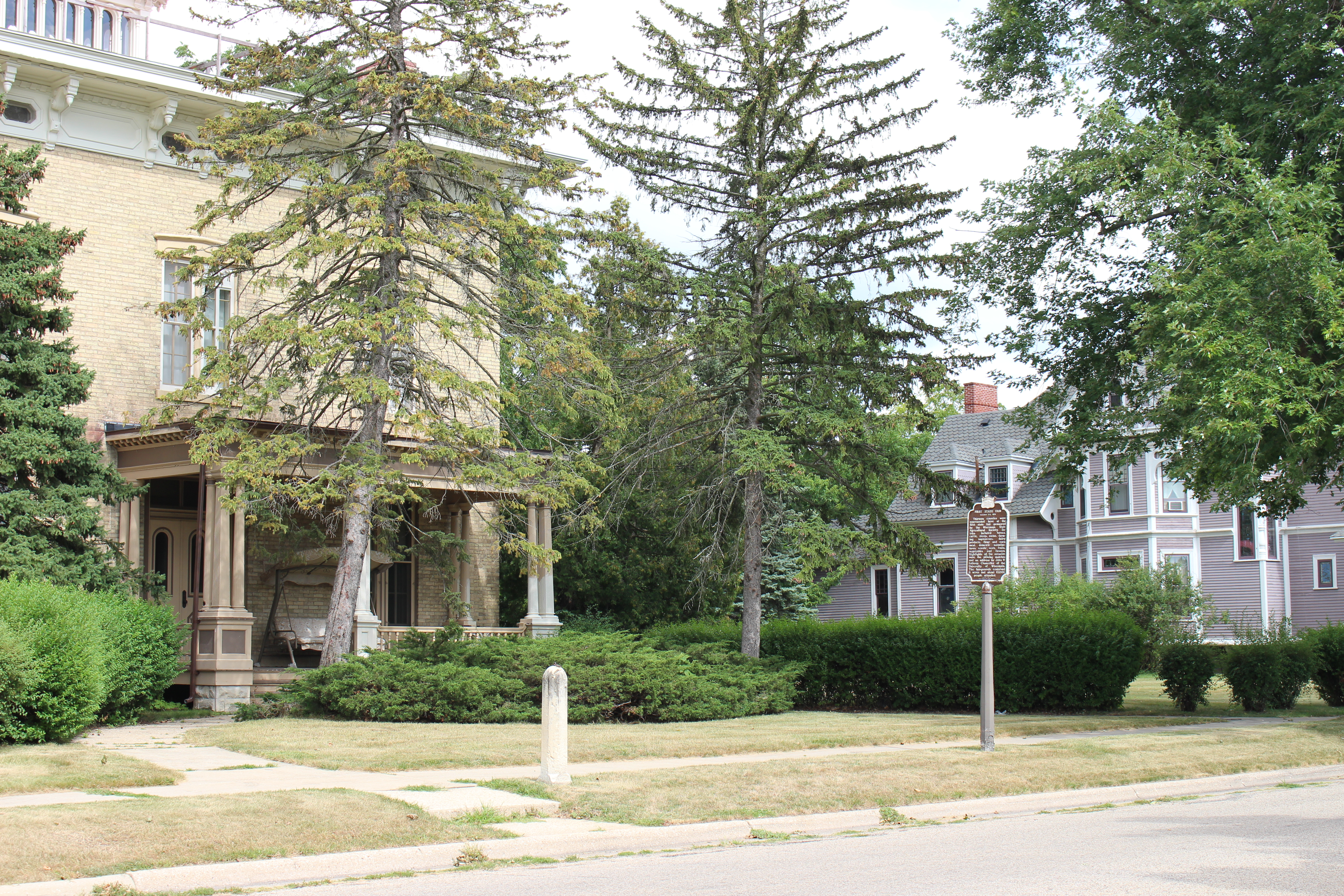
Courthouse Hill Historic District

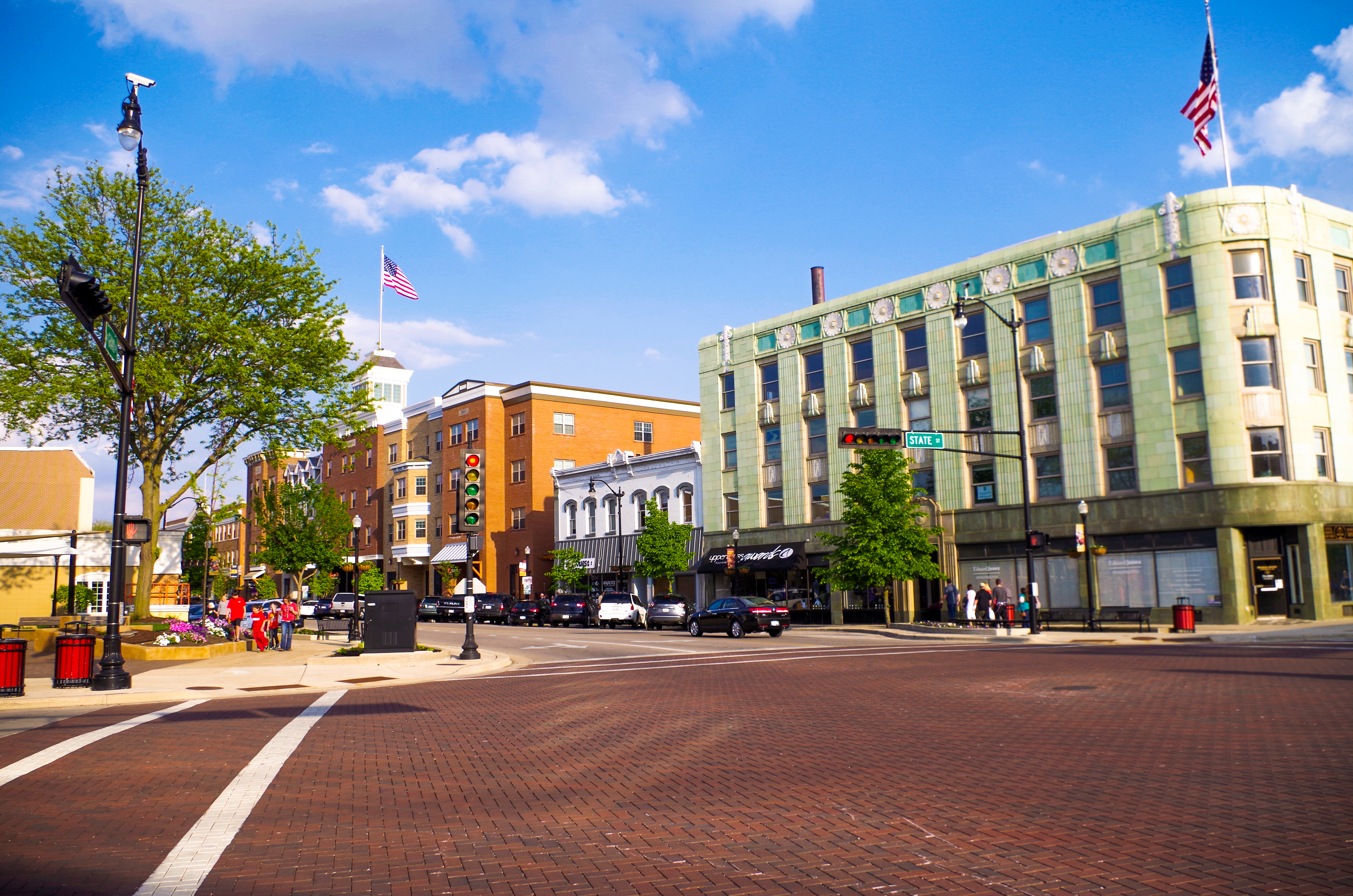
Downtown Beloit

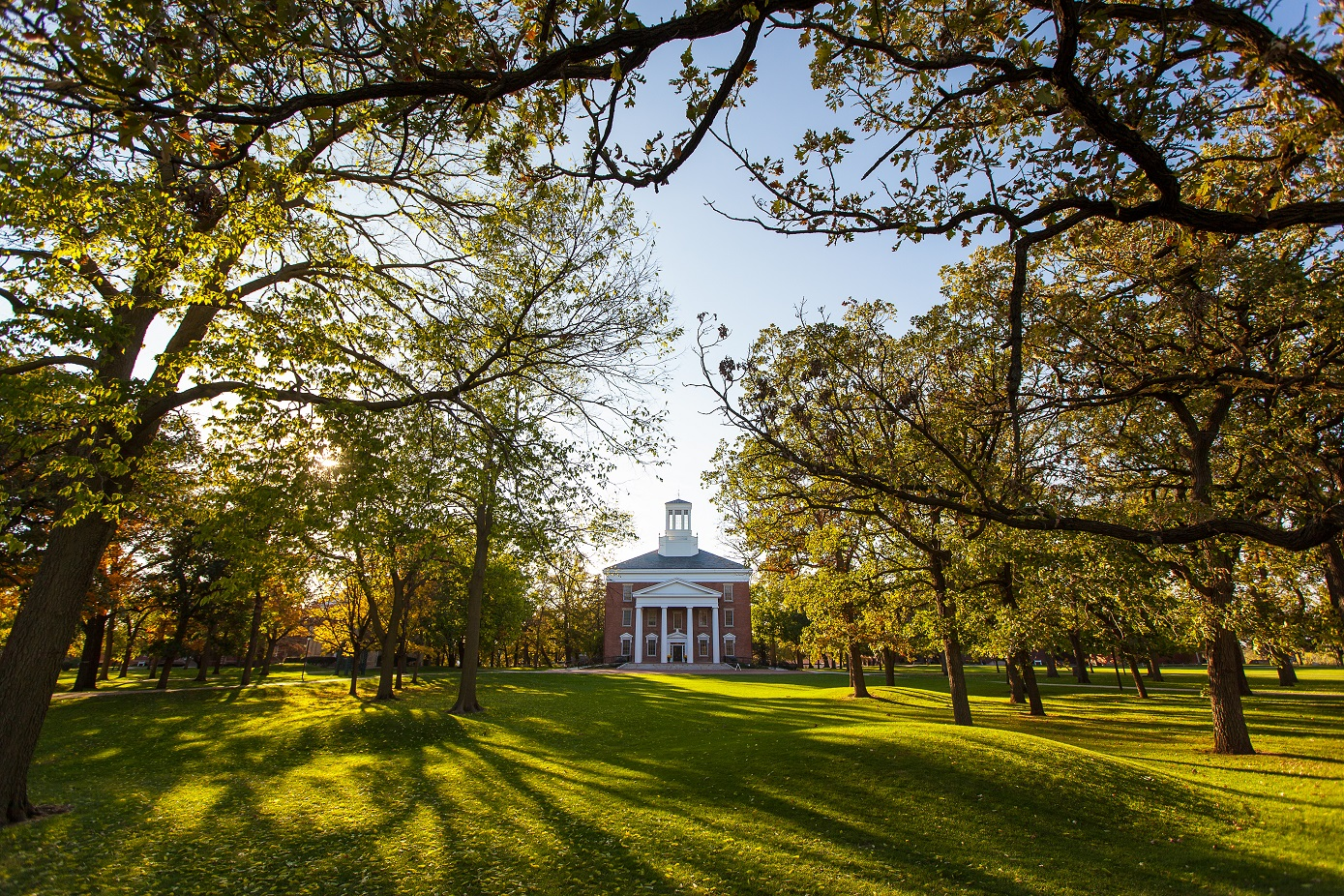
Middle College, part of Beloit College

== Past senators ==
The district has previously been represented by:

Note: the boundaries of districts have changed repeatedly over history. Previous politicians of a specific numbered district have represented a completely different geographic area, due to redistricting.

Senator	Party	Notes	Session	Years	District Definition
District created				1848	Rock County
Otis Norton	Whig		1st	1848	Rock County
Otis Norton	Whig		2nd	1849	Rock County
Otis Norton	Whig		3rd	1850	Rock County
Andrew Palmer	Dem.		4th	1851	Rock County
Andrew Palmer	Dem.		5th	1852	Rock County
Levi Sterling	Whig		6th	1853	1852–1855 1856–1860; Iowa & Richland counties
Levi Sterling	Whig		7th	1854	1852–1855 1856–1860; Iowa & Richland counties
Amasa Cobb	Rep.		8th	1855	1852–1855 1856–1860; Iowa & Richland counties
Amasa Cobb	Rep.		9th	1856	1852–1855 1856–1860; Iowa & Richland counties
Lemuel W. Joiner	Rep.		10th	1857	1852–1855 1856–1860; Iowa & Richland counties
Lemuel W. Joiner	Rep.		11th	1858	1852–1855 1856–1860; Iowa & Richland counties
Charles Rodolf	Dem.		12th	1859	1852–1855 1856–1860; Iowa & Richland counties
Charles Rodolf	Dem.		13th	1860	1852–1855 1856–1860; Iowa & Richland counties
Lemuel W. Joiner	Rep.		14th	1861	1852–1855 1856–1860; Iowa & Richland counties
Lemuel W. Joiner	Rep.		15th	1862	1861–1865 1866–1870; Iowa County
George L. Frost	Dem.		16th	1863	1861–1865 1866–1870; Iowa County
George L. Frost	Dem.		17th	1864	1861–1865 1866–1870; Iowa County
Wyman Lincoln	Natl. Union		18th	1865	1861–1865 1866–1870; Iowa County
Wyman Lincoln	Natl. Union		19th	1866	1861–1865 1866–1870; Iowa County
Joel Whitman	Natl. Union		20th	1867	1861–1865 1866–1870; Iowa County
Joel Whitman	Rep.		21st	1868	1861–1865 1866–1870; Iowa County
Lemuel W. Joiner	Rep.		22nd	1869	1861–1865 1866–1870; Iowa County
Lemuel W. Joiner	Rep.		23rd	1870	1861–1865 1866–1870; Iowa County
Francis Little	Rep.	Redistricted to 9th district	24th	1871	1861–1865 1866–1870; Iowa County
Carl H. Schmidt	Dem.	Redistricted from 19th district	25th	1872	1871–1875 1876–1881 1882–1887; Manitowoc County
Carl H. Schmidt	Dem.	Redistricted from 19th district	26th	1873	1871–1875 1876–1881 1882–1887; Manitowoc County
Carl H. Schmidt	Dem.	Redistricted from 19th district	27th	1874	1871–1875 1876–1881 1882–1887; Manitowoc County
John Schuette	Rep.		28th	1875	1871–1875 1876–1881 1882–1887; Manitowoc County
John Schuette	Rep.		29th	1876	1871–1875 1876–1881 1882–1887; Manitowoc County
Joseph Rankin	Dem.		30th	1877	1871–1875 1876–1881 1882–1887; Manitowoc County
Joseph Rankin	Dem.		31st	1878	1871–1875 1876–1881 1882–1887; Manitowoc County
Joseph Rankin	Dem.		32nd	1879	1871–1875 1876–1881 1882–1887; Manitowoc County
Joseph Rankin	Dem.		33rd	1880	1871–1875 1876–1881 1882–1887; Manitowoc County
Joseph Rankin	Dem.		34th	1881	1871–1875 1876–1881 1882–1887; Manitowoc County
Joseph Rankin	Dem.		35th	1882	1871–1875 1876–1881 1882–1887; Manitowoc County
John Carey	Dem.		36th	1883–1884	1871–1875 1876–1881 1882–1887; Manitowoc County
John Carey	Dem.		37th	1885–1886	1871–1875 1876–1881 1882–1887; Manitowoc County
John Carey	Dem.		38th	1887–1888	1871–1875 1876–1881 1882–1887; Manitowoc County
William F. Nash	Dem.	Won 1888 special election.	39th	1889–1890	Kewaunee & Manitowoc counties
William F. Nash	Dem.	Won 1888 special election.	40th	1891–1892	Kewaunee & Manitowoc counties
William F. Nash	Dem.	Won 1888 special election.	41st	1893–1894	1892–1895 1896–1901 1902–1911 1912–1921; Calumet & Manitowoc counties
John McMullen	Dem.		42nd	1895–1896	1892–1895 1896–1901 1902–1911 1912–1921; Calumet & Manitowoc counties
John McMullen	Dem.		43rd	1897–1898	1892–1895 1896–1901 1902–1911 1912–1921; Calumet & Manitowoc counties
Norman Knudson	Rep.		44th	1899–1900	1892–1895 1896–1901 1902–1911 1912–1921; Calumet & Manitowoc counties
Norman Knudson	Rep.		45th	1901–1902	1892–1895 1896–1901 1902–1911 1912–1921; Calumet & Manitowoc counties
Samuel W. Randolph	Dem.		46th	1903–1904	1892–1895 1896–1901 1902–1911 1912–1921; Calumet & Manitowoc counties
Samuel W. Randolph	Dem.		47th	1905–1906	1892–1895 1896–1901 1902–1911 1912–1921; Calumet & Manitowoc counties
Samuel W. Randolph	Dem.		48th	1907–1908	1892–1895 1896–1901 1902–1911 1912–1921; Calumet & Manitowoc counties
Samuel W. Randolph	Dem.		49th	1909–1910	1892–1895 1896–1901 1902–1911 1912–1921; Calumet & Manitowoc counties
Samuel W. Randolph	Dem.		50th	1911–1912	1892–1895 1896–1901 1902–1911 1912–1921; Calumet & Manitowoc counties
Samuel W. Randolph	Dem.		51st	1913–1914	1892–1895 1896–1901 1902–1911 1912–1921; Calumet & Manitowoc counties
Henry Rollman	Dem.		52nd	1915–1916	1892–1895 1896–1901 1902–1911 1912–1921; Calumet & Manitowoc counties
Henry Rollman	Dem.		53rd	1917–1918	1892–1895 1896–1901 1902–1911 1912–1921; Calumet & Manitowoc counties
Henry Kleist	Soc.		54th	1919–1920	1892–1895 1896–1901 1902–1911 1912–1921; Calumet & Manitowoc counties
Henry Kleist	Soc.		55th	1921–1922	1892–1895 1896–1901 1902–1911 1912–1921; Calumet & Manitowoc counties
Alva Garey	Rep.		56th	1923–1924	1922–1953 1954–1963; Rock County
Alva Garey	Rep.		57th	1925–1926	1922–1953 1954–1963; Rock County
George W. Blanchard	Rep.	Resigned 1933 after election to U.S. House.	58th	1927–1928	1922–1953 1954–1963; Rock County
George W. Blanchard	Rep.	Resigned 1933 after election to U.S. House.	59th	1929–1930	1922–1953 1954–1963; Rock County
George W. Blanchard	Rep.	Resigned 1933 after election to U.S. House.	60th	1931–1932	1922–1953 1954–1963; Rock County
George W. Blanchard	Rep.	Resigned 1933 after election to U.S. House.	61st	1933–1934	1922–1953 1954–1963; Rock County
—Vacant--			61st	1933–1934	1922–1953 1954–1963; Rock County
Alexander Paul	Dem.	Won 1933 special election.	61st	1933–1934	1922–1953 1954–1963; Rock County
Maurice Coakley	Rep.		62nd	1935–1936	1922–1953 1954–1963; Rock County
Maurice Coakley	Rep.		63rd	1937–1938	1922–1953 1954–1963; Rock County
Maurice Coakley	Rep.		64th	1939–1940	1922–1953 1954–1963; Rock County
Maurice Coakley	Rep.		65th	1941–1942	1922–1953 1954–1963; Rock County
Robert P. Robinson	Rep.		66th	1943–1944	1922–1953 1954–1963; Rock County
Robert P. Robinson	Rep.		67th	1945–1946	1922–1953 1954–1963; Rock County
Robert P. Robinson	Rep.		68th	1947–1948	1922–1953 1954–1963; Rock County
Robert P. Robinson	Rep.		69th	1949–1950	1922–1953 1954–1963; Rock County
Robert P. Robinson	Rep.		70th	1951–1952	1922–1953 1954–1963; Rock County
Robert P. Robinson	Rep.		71st	1953–1954	1922–1953 1954–1963; Rock County
Peter P. Carr	Rep.		72nd	1955–1956	1922–1953 1954–1963; Rock County
Peter P. Carr	Rep.		73rd	1957–1958	1922–1953 1954–1963; Rock County
Peter P. Carr	Rep.		74th	1959–1960	1922–1953 1954–1963; Rock County
Peter P. Carr	Rep.		75th	1961–1962	1922–1953 1954–1963; Rock County
Peter P. Carr	Rep.		76th	1963–1964	1922–1953 1954–1963; Rock County
Peter P. Carr	Rep.		77th	1965–1966	Walworth County & eastern Rock County: Town of Bradford; Town of Clinton; Town of Harmony; Town of Johnstown; Town of La Prairie; Town of Turtle; Village of Clinton; City of Beloit; City of Janesville
George M. Borg	Rep.	Resigned Aug. 1967.	78th	1967–1968	Walworth County & eastern Rock County: Town of Bradford; Town of Clinton; Town of Harmony; Town of Johnstown; Town of La Prairie; Town of Turtle; Village of Clinton; City of Beloit; City of Janesville
—Vacant--			78th	1967–1968	Walworth County & eastern Rock County: Town of Bradford; Town of Clinton; Town of Harmony; Town of Johnstown; Town of La Prairie; Town of Turtle; Village of Clinton; City of Beloit; City of Janesville
James D. Swan	Rep.	Won 1967 special election.	78th	1967–1968	Walworth County & eastern Rock County: Town of Bradford; Town of Clinton; Town of Harmony; Town of Johnstown; Town of La Prairie; Town of Turtle; Village of Clinton; City of Beloit; City of Janesville
James D. Swan	Rep.	Won 1967 special election.	79th	1969–1970	Walworth County & eastern Rock County: Town of Bradford; Town of Clinton; Town of Harmony; Town of Johnstown; Town of La Prairie; Town of Turtle; Village of Clinton; City of Beloit; City of Janesville
James D. Swan	Rep.	Won 1967 special election.	80th	1971–1972	Walworth County & eastern Rock County: Town of Bradford; Town of Clinton; Town of Harmony; Town of Johnstown; Town of La Prairie; Town of Turtle; Village of Clinton; City of Beloit; City of Janesville
James D. Swan	Rep.	Won 1967 special election.	81st	1973–1974	Western Racine County, eastern Rock County, & most of Walworth County: Racine County; Town of Burlington; Town of Norway; Town of Rochester; Town of Waterford; Village of Rochester; Village of Waterford; City of Burlington; Rock County; Town of Beloit; Town of Bradford; Town of Clinton; Town of Johnstown; Town of La Prairie; Town of Lima; Town of Rock; Town of Turtle; Village of Clinton; City of Beloit; Part of the city of Janesville; Walworth County; Town of Darien; Town of Delavan; Town of East Troy; Town of Geneva; Town of La Grange; Town of Lafayette; Town of Linn; Town of Lyons; Town of Richmond; Town of Sharon; Town of Spring Prairie; Town of Sugar Creek; Town of Troy; Town of Walworth; Town of Whitewater; Village of Darien; Village of East Troy; Village of Fontana-on-Geneva Lake; Village of Sharon; Village of Walworth; Village of Williams Bay; City of Delavan; City of Elkhorn; City of Lake Geneva; Part of the city of Whitewater
Timothy Cullen	Dem.	Resigned 1987 after appointed Secretary of Wisconsin Department of Health Services.	82nd	1975–1976	
Timothy Cullen	Dem.	Resigned 1987 after appointed Secretary of Wisconsin Department of Health Services.	83rd	1977–1978	
Timothy Cullen	Dem.	Resigned 1987 after appointed Secretary of Wisconsin Department of Health Services.	84th	1979–1980	
Timothy Cullen	Dem.	Resigned 1987 after appointed Secretary of Wisconsin Department of Health Services.	85th	1981–1982	
Timothy Cullen	Dem.	Resigned 1987 after appointed Secretary of Wisconsin Department of Health Services.	86th	1983–1984	Most of Walworth County Southeast and central Rock County: Town of Beloit; Town of Bradford; Town of Clinton; Town of Janesville; Town of La Prairie; Town of Rock; Town of Turtle; Village of Clinton; City of Beloit; Wards 1-13, 20, 21, City of Janesville
Timothy Cullen	Dem.	Resigned 1987 after appointed Secretary of Wisconsin Department of Health Services.	87th	1985–1986	Most of Walworth County South and central Rock County: Town of Beloit; Town of Bradford; Town of Clinton; Town of Janesville; Town of La Prairie; Town of Newark; Town of Rock; Town of Turtle; Village of Clinton; City of Beloit; Wards 1, 3-14, 20, 21, City of Janesville
—Vacant--			88th	1987–1988	Most of Walworth County South and central Rock County: Town of Beloit; Town of Bradford; Town of Clinton; Town of Janesville; Town of La Prairie; Town of Newark; Town of Rock; Town of Turtle; Village of Clinton; City of Beloit; Wards 1, 3-14, 20, 21, City of Janesville
Timothy Weeden	Rep.	Won 1987 special election.	88th	1987–1988	Most of Walworth County South and central Rock County: Town of Beloit; Town of Bradford; Town of Clinton; Town of Janesville; Town of La Prairie; Town of Newark; Town of Rock; Town of Turtle; Village of Clinton; City of Beloit; Wards 1, 3-14, 20, 21, City of Janesville
Timothy Weeden	Rep.	Won 1987 special election.	89th	1989–1990	Most of Walworth County South and central Rock County: Town of Beloit; Town of Bradford; Town of Clinton; Town of Janesville; Town of La Prairie; Town of Newark; Town of Rock; Town of Turtle; Village of Clinton; City of Beloit; Wards 1, 3-14, 20, 21, City of Janesville
Timothy Weeden	Rep.	Won 1987 special election.	90th	1991–1992	Most of Walworth County South and central Rock County: Town of Beloit; Town of Bradford; Town of Clinton; Town of Janesville; Town of La Prairie; Town of Newark; Town of Rock; Town of Turtle; Village of Clinton; City of Beloit; Wards 1, 3-14, 20, 21, City of Janesville
Timothy Weeden	Rep.	Won 1987 special election.	91st	1993–1994	Most Walworth County: Town of Darien; Town of Delavan; Town of La Grange; Town of Lafayette; Town of Linn; Town of Lyons; Town of Richmond; Town of Sharon; Town of Spring Prairie; Town of Sugar Creek; Town of Walworth; Village of Darien; Village of Fontana-on-Geneva Lake; Village of Sharon; Village of Walworth; Village of Williams Bay; City of Delavan; City of Elkhorn; Wards 1-6, 8, Town of Geneva; South and east Rock County: Town of Beloit; Town of Bradford; Town of Clinton; Town of Johnstown; Town of La Prairie; Town of Newark; Town of Rock; Town of Turtle; Village of Clinton; City of Beloit; Wards 2-4, Town of Harmony; Wards 1-10, 13-22, City of Janesville
Timothy Weeden	Rep.	Won 1987 special election.	92nd	1995–1996	
Timothy Weeden	Rep.	Won 1987 special election.	93rd	1997–1998	
Judy Robson	Dem.		94th	1999–2000	
Judy Robson	Dem.		95th	2001–2002	
Judy Robson	Dem.		96th	2003–2004	Most of Rock County: Town of Avon; Town of Beloit; Town of Bradford; Town of Center; Town of Clinton; Town of Fulton; Town of Harmony; Town of Janesville; Town of Johnstown; Town of La Prairie; Town of Milton; Town of Newark; Town of Plymouth; Town of Porter; Town of Rock; Town of Spring Valley; Town of Turtle; Village of Clinton; Village of Footville; Village of Orfordville; City of Beloit; City of Edgerton; City of Janesville; City of Milton; Part of Northwest Walworth County: Town of Richmond; Town of Whitewater; City of Whitewater; Part of Jefferson County: City of Whitewater; Part of Dane County: City of Edgerton
Judy Robson	Dem.		97th	2005–2006	
Judy Robson	Dem.		98th	2007–2008	
Judy Robson	Dem.		99th	2009–2010	
Timothy Cullen	Dem.		100th	2011–2012	
Timothy Cullen	Dem.		101st	2013–2014	Most of Rock County; Southeast Green County; Southeast Dane County Southwest Jefferson County: Town of Cold Spring; Town of Sumner; Part of the Town of Koshkonong; City of Whitewater; Part of northwest Walworth County: Town of Whitewater; City of Whitewater
Janis Ringhand	Dem.		102nd	2015–2016	Most of Rock County; Southeast Green County; Southeast Dane County Southwest Jefferson County: Town of Cold Spring; Town of Sumner; Part of the Town of Koshkonong; City of Whitewater; Part of northwest Walworth County: Town of Whitewater; City of Whitewater
Janis Ringhand	Dem.		103rd	2017–2018	Most of Rock County; Southeast Green County; Southeast Dane County Southwest Jefferson County: Town of Cold Spring; Town of Sumner; Part of the Town of Koshkonong; City of Whitewater; Part of northwest Walworth County: Town of Whitewater; City of Whitewater
Janis Ringhand	Dem.		104th	2019–2020	Most of Rock County; Southeast Green County; Southeast Dane County Southwest Jefferson County: Town of Cold Spring; Town of Sumner; Part of the Town of Koshkonong; City of Whitewater; Part of northwest Walworth County: Town of Whitewater; City of Whitewater
Janis Ringhand	Dem.		105th	2021–2022	Most of Rock County; Southeast Green County; Southeast Dane County Southwest Jefferson County: Town of Cold Spring; Town of Sumner; Part of the Town of Koshkonong; City of Whitewater; Part of northwest Walworth County: Town of Whitewater; City of Whitewater
Mark Spreitzer	Dem.	Elected 2022.	106th	2023–2024	Southeast Dane County, parts of Green County, western Rock County
Mark Spreitzer	Dem.	Elected 2022.	107th	2025–2026	
