= Carl Schmidt (politician) =

American politician (1835–1888)

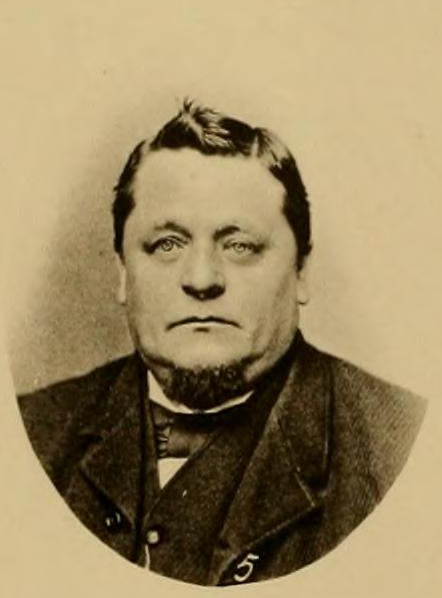
- From Soldiers' and Citizens' Album of Biographical Record (1888)

County Judge of Manitowoc County, Wisconsin
- In office January 4, 1886 – January 7, 1888
- Preceded by: Reuben D. Smart
- Succeeded by: Emil Baensch

Member of the Wisconsin Senate
- In office January 1, 1872 – January 4, 1875
- Preceded by: Francis Little
- Succeeded by: John Schuette
- Constituency: 15th district
- In office January 2, 1871 – January 1, 1872
- Preceded by: George B. Reed
- Succeeded by: James H. Foster
- Constituency: 19th district

Member of the Wisconsin State Assembly from the Manitowoc 3rd district
- In office January 3, 1870 – January 2, 1871
- Preceded by: Jabez L. Fobes
- Succeeded by: Joseph Rankin

Personal details
- Born: September 30, 1835 Luebbecke, Westphalia, Prussia
- Died: January 7, 1888 (aged 52) Manitowoc, Wisconsin, U.S.
- Resting place: Evergreen Cemetery, Manitowoc, Wisconsin
- Party: Democratic
- Spouse: married
- Children: Emil Schmidt; C. Otto Schmidt; Carl Schmidt; Arthur Schmidt; Walter Schmidt
- Occupation: Newspaper publisher

Military service
- Allegiance: United States
- Branch/service: United States Volunteers; Union Army
- Years of service: 1861–1864
- Rank: Captain, USV
- Unit: 9th Reg. Wis. Vol. Infantry
- Battles/wars: American Civil War

Carl Heinrich (Henry) Schmidt (September 30, 1835 – January 7, 1888) was a German American immigrant, newspaper publisher, and Democratic politician. He was a member of the Wisconsin State Senate and the State Assembly, representing Manitowoc County during the 1870s.

== Early life ==
Schmidt was born on September 30, 1835, in the Province of Westphalia, Prussia, in what is now western Germany. He was trained as a printer in Prussia and emigrated to the United States in 1854 with his family. They resided briefly at Milwaukee before moving to Manitowoc, Wisconsin.

In Milwaukee, he worked in the printing office of Der Seebote, a German language newspaper. He was then hired as foreman in the printing office of the Wisconsin Demokrat and the Manitowoc Tribune newspapers. But within a few months, with backing from his father, he purchased materials to establish his own newspaper. He established Der Nord-Westen, a German language paper, in July 1855 and published it through 1860, after which time he sold his company and joined up with a militia company for service in the American Civil War.

== Civil War service ==
Schmidt joined up with a company of German-speaking volunteers, which were organized into the mostly German-speaking unit, the 9th Wisconsin Infantry Regiment. During the organization of the regiment, Schmidt was appointed first sergeant in Company B. The 9th Wisconsin Infantry mustered into service in January 1862, and were sent to Kansas. They were assigned to the Army of the Frontier, operating in the trans-Mississippi and western theaters of the war.

In his war service, Schmidt was most known for the year he served as acting quartermaster of the regiment, in 1864, having command of the supply depot at Little Rock, Arkansas, during the Red River campaign. When the news reached Little Rock of the expedition's retreat and famished condition, Schmidt assembled and led a train of supplies to meet and resupply the army in the field.

In January 1863, Schmidt was commissioned second lieutenant of Company K, and was later promoted to captain of Company F in the Summer of 1864. He retired at the end of his three-year enlistment in December 1864.

== Political career ==
Returning from the war, he repurchased his printing business and resumed publication of Der Nord-Westen, which he continued through the rest of his life.

He became involved in local government and, in 1867, he was elected a trustee of the village of Manitowoc. He lost re-election for that office in 1868, but in 1869 he was elected to the Wisconsin State Assembly, running on the Democratic Party ticket. In the 1870 session of the Legislature, Schmidt represented Manitowoc County's 3rd Assembly district, which then comprised the northeast corner of the state. While serving in the Assembly, Manitowoc was incorporated as a city. Schmidt ran for mayor in the city's first mayoral election in April 1870, but was defeated by Peter Johnston.

That Fall, he was the Democratic candidate for State Senate in the 19th Senate district. Although Manitowoc County at the time was strongly Democratic, he faced a close three-way race in the general election due to a split in the county Democratic Party over grievances against the party leadership. He ultimately prevailed with 47% of the vote over Republican John Carey and "peoples' Democrat" William Bach.

During his first year in the Senate, the 1871 redistricting law renumbered his 19th Senate district to the 15th district—the boundaries of the district remained the same. Schmidt won re-election in 1872 but was not a candidate for a third term in 1874.

Through the 1870s he served in several local offices, including alderman, county supervisor, and justice of the peace. In 1885 he was elected county judge. He was still serving in this role when he died in January 1888. His death was caused by dropsy.

== Personal life and family ==
Carl Henry Schmidt had a younger brother named Carl Gottlieb Schmidt, who was also a prominent German American newspaper publisher in Wisconsin. After Carl Henry Schmidt's death, his brother took over publication of his newspaper, Der Nord-Westen.

Schmidt was survived by a wife and five children.

== Electoral history ==
=== Wisconsin Assembly (1869) ===
Wisconsin Assembly, Manitowoc 3rd District Election, 1869
| Party | Candidate | Votes | % | ±% |
|---|---|---|---|---|
General Election, November 2, 1869
| Democratic | Carl Schmidt | 828 | 57.78% | |
| Republican | Jabez L. Fobes (incumbent) | 605 | 42.22% | |
| Plurality | | 223 | 15.56% | |
| Total votes | | 1,433 | 100.0% | |
| Democratic gain from Republican | | | | |

=== Manitowoc Mayor (1870) ===
Manitowoc Mayoral Election, 1870
| Party | Candidate | Votes | % | ±% |
|---|---|---|---|---|
General Election, April 5, 1870
| Republican | Peter Johnston | 530 | 66.42% | |
| Democratic | Carl Schmidt | 268 | 33.58% | |
| Plurality | | 262 | 32.83% | |
| Total votes | | 798 | 100.0% | |
| Republican win (new seat) | | | | |

=== Wisconsin Senate (1870, 1872) ===
Wisconsin Senate, 19th District Election, 1870
| Party | Candidate | Votes | % | ±% |
|---|---|---|---|---|
General Election, November 8, 1870
| Democratic | Carl Schmidt | 2,141 | 46.92% | |
| Republican | John Carey | 1,411 | 30.92% | |
| Independent Democratic | William Bach | 1,011 | 22.16% | |
| Plurality | | 730 | 16.00% | |
| Total votes | | 4,563 | 100.0% | |
| Democratic gain from Republican | | | | |

Wisconsin Senate, 15th District Election, 1872
| Party | Candidate | Votes | % | ±% |
|---|---|---|---|---|
General Election, November 5, 1872
| Democratic | Carl Schmidt (incumbent) | 2,579 | 52.42% | |
| Republican | H. H. Smith | 2,341 | 47.58% | |
| Plurality | | 238 | 4.84% | |
| Total votes | | 4,920 | 100.0% | |
| Democratic hold | | | | |

Wisconsin State Assembly
| Preceded by Jabez L. Fobes | Member of the Wisconsin State Assembly from the Manitowoc 3rd district January 3, 1870 – January 2, 1871 | Succeeded by Joseph Rankin |
Wisconsin Senate
| Preceded by George B. Reed | Member of the Wisconsin Senate from the 19th district January 2, 1871 – January 1, 1872 | Succeeded by James H. Foster |
| Preceded by Francis Little | Member of the Wisconsin Senate from the 15th district January 1, 1872 – January 4, 1875 | Succeeded by John Schuette |
Legal offices
| Preceded by Reuben D. Smart | County Judge of Manitowoc County, Wisconsin; January 4, 1886 – January 7, 1888 | Succeeded by Emil Baensch |
