= Wisconsin Highway 140 =

State highway in Wisconsin, United States

State Trunk Highway 140
- WIS 140 highlighted in red

Route information
- Maintained by WisDOT
- Length: 11.5 mi (18.5 km)

Major junctions
- South end: IL 76 in Bergen
- I-43 in Clinton
- North end: US 14 / WIS 11 in Avalon

Location
- Country: United States
- State: Wisconsin
- Counties: Rock

Highway system
- Wisconsin State Trunk Highway System; Interstate; US; State; Scenic; Rustic
← WIS 139	→ US 141

State Trunk Highway 140 (often called Highway 140, STH-140 or WIS 140) is an 11.50-mile (18.51 km) state highway in Rock County, Wisconsin, United States, that runs in north–south from the Illinois border, near Bergen, through Clinton to east of Emerald Grove. The highway was designated in 1923/1924 and paved in the early 1930s.

== Route description ==
The highway is maintained by the Wisconsin Department of Transportation (WisDOT). The highway is not part of the National Highway System; a system of highways important to the nation’s economy, defense, and mobility.

The highway begins at the Wisconsin–Illinois state line near Bergen as a continuation of Illinois Route 76 (IL 76), and runs north from it. It meets with brief pockets of forested parkland and runs through farmland, passing through intersections with WIS 67 and County Trunk Highway P (CTH-P). It then crosses a railroad before reaching the village of Clinton, where it intersects with CTH-X and CTH-J. The busiest part of the highway is within the village of Clinton, which has an Annual average daily traffic (AADT) count of 5,600.

Just north of Clinton, it passes through a diamond interchange with Interstate 43 (I-43) and then continues north, entering the town of Bradford just north of I-43 and passing through more farmland. The highway then passes by a small community and runs across Turtle Creek before swerving slightly to the east. The highway then runs north through more farmland and crosses a railroad which it follows northeast of Avalon, then running north from it before terminating at US Highway 14 (US 14)/WIS 11 east of Emerald Grove. The least busy part of the highway is located between Avalon and US 14, which an AADT of 2,100.

== History ==
The highway was designated by 1924. It was a gravel road along its entire route. In 1931, the southern two-thirds of the highway was paved and the rest of the highway was paved in 1932.

== Major intersections ==
The entire route is in Rock County.

Location	mi	km	Destinations	Notes
Town of Clinton	0.0	0.0	IL 76 south – Belvidere	Illinois state line; road continues south as IL 76
Town of Clinton	1.1	1.8	WIS 67 – Beloit, Sharon	
Town of Clinton	2.5	4.0	CTH-P	
Village of Clinton	4.5	7.2	CTH-J / CTH-X	
Town of Clinton	5.5	8.9	I-43 / Alt. I-39 south – Beloit, Milwaukee	Interchange; south end of I-43 Alt; I-39 Alt follows I-43 south
Town of Bradford	11.5	18.5	US 14 / WIS 11 / Alt. I-39 north / Alt. I-43 north – Janesville, Darien, Delavan	I-39 Alt and I-43 Alt follow US 14/WIS 11 west
1.000 mi = 1.609 km; 1.000 km = 0.621 mi
