= Joseph Rankin =

American businessman and politician

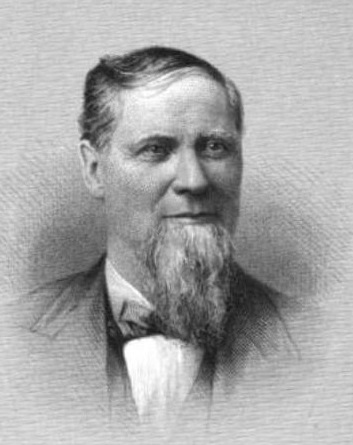

Member of the U.S. House of Representatives from Wisconsin's 5th district
- In office March 4, 1883 – January 24, 1886
- Preceded by: Edward S. Bragg
- Succeeded by: Thomas R. Hudd

Chair of the Democratic Party of Wisconsin
- In office January 1, 1878 – January 1, 1880
- Preceded by: Wendell A. Anderson
- Succeeded by: Alfred C. Parkinson

Member of the Wisconsin Senate from the 15th district
- In office January 1, 1877 – January 1, 1883
- Preceded by: John Schuette
- Succeeded by: John Carey

Member of the Wisconsin State Assembly
- In office January 2, 1871 – January 4, 1875
- Preceded by: Carl H. Schmidt
- Succeeded by: Reuben D. Smart
- Constituency: Manitowoc 3rd district
- In office January 2, 1860 – January 7, 1861
- Preceded by: William Aldrich
- Succeeded by: Jabez L. Fobes
- Constituency: Manitowoc 1st district

Personal details
- Born: September 25, 1833 Passaic, New Jersey, U.S.
- Died: January 24, 1886 (aged 52) Washington, D.C., U.S.
- Resting place: Evergreen Cemetery, Manitowoc, Wisconsin
- Party: Democratic
- Spouse: Amelia S. Borcherdt
- Children: Jennie & Joseph

Military service
- Allegiance: United States
- Branch/service: United States Volunteers; Union Army
- Years of service: 1862–1865
- Rank: Captain, USV
- Unit: 27th Reg. Wis. Vol Infantry
- Battles/wars: American Civil War: Siege of Vicksburg; Little Rock Campaign; Camden Expedition; Mobile Campaign

Joseph Rankin (September 25, 1833 – January 24, 1886) was an American businessman and Democratic politician. He was elected to two terms as U.S. Representative for Wisconsin's 5th congressional district, but died during his second term. Earlier in his career, he served 11 years in the Wisconsin Legislature, representing Manitowoc County, and was chairman of the Democratic Party of Wisconsin.

== Biography ==
Joseph Rankin was born in Passaic, New Jersey, in 1833. As a child, his parents moved the family to New York, and he was educated at the Homer Academy in Cortland County.

In 1854, he came to settle at Mishicot, in Manitowoc County, Wisconsin. He worked briefly in the lumbering industry, but soon opened a general store.

Rankin was soon elected to the Manitowoc County Board of Supervisors, and, in 1859, he was elected to his first term in the Wisconsin State Assembly, representing Manitowoc's 1st Assembly district (the village of Manitowoc and some of the eastern part of the county).

== Civil War service ==
Rankin left office in 1861, as the secession crisis was taking place across the American south. Rankin immediately volunteered for service in the American Civil War and joined up with a company of volunteers known as the "Manitowoc Guards". He was initially elected lieutenant, but was later removed by a vote of the company. Rankin instead accepted a commission from the Governor to assist in new recruiting efforts.

He recruited a new volunteer company in Manitowoc and was elected captain. He brought his volunteers to Camp Sigel, in Milwaukee, where they were enrolled as Company D in the 27th Wisconsin Infantry Regiment.

The 27th Wisconsin Infantry mustered into service in March 1863 and was ordered to Columbus, Kentucky, for service in the trans-Mississippi theater of the war. They were soon ordered to proceed to Vicksburg, Mississippi, but participated in the Battle of Yazoo City en route. They were organized into XVI Corps at the Siege of Vicksburg.

After the fall of Vicksburg, they were assigned to VII Corps (Department of Arkansas) and participated in the "Little Rock campaign" under General Frederick Steele. They subsequently joined Steele's detachment in the Camden Expedition through southern Arkansas, in coordination with the simultaneous Red River campaign in Louisiana. After the withdrawal of the Red River campaign, the 27th Wisconsin and its division were ordered back to Little Rock, but were pursued and engaged in battle en route at the Battle of Jenkins' Ferry. They spent the rest of 1864 engaged in guard duty in central Arkansas.

In February 1865, they were ordered to join General Edward Canby on the "Mobile Campaign". They proceeded on transports down the river to New Orleans, then reembarked to Mobile Bay. On March 27, 1865, they took position in the trenches for the Battle of Spanish Fort and remained until the end of the siege. They then moved through Mobile in April and May, consolidating control of the region while Confederate forces surrendered. They were subsequently ordered into Texas, where they remained through the summer until August, when they were mustered out of federal service.

== Political career ==
After the war, Rankin returned to Manitowoc and was elected city attorney, serving through 1871. In 1870, he was elected to another term in the Wisconsin State Assembly, and was subsequently re-elected in 1871, 1872, and 1873. He did not run for another term in 1874, but in 1876 was elected to the Wisconsin State Senate, representing the 15th Senate district (then comprising all of Manitowoc County). He served three two-year terms in the Senate, serving on the committee on railroads for all six years, and also serving five years on the judiciary committee (1877–1881), and 1 year on the state affairs committee (1882). He was known as a skilled parliamentarian, but not a speech-maker.

Concurrent with his service in the Senate, he was elected chairman of the Democratic Party of Wisconsin in 1877, and served in that role for 1878 and 1879.

In 1882, Rankin participated in the redistricting process and was accused of drawing the new 5th congressional district to favor his own election to that seat. He insisted that he was not a candidate for Congress through the Summer, but at the district convention in Manitowoc, his name was placed in nomination. He was chosen as the Democratic nominee on the 126th ballot, over Thomas R. Hudd, who had campaigned extensively for the nomination. Rankin was easily elected in the November general election in the heavily Democratic district and was re-elected in 1884, serving in the Forty-eighth and Forty-ninth congresses.

Shortly after arriving in Congress, however, Rankin began suffering from a long illness, which would eventually result in his death. He succumbed and died on January 24, 1886, in Washington, D.C. He was interred in Evergreen Cemetery, Manitowoc, Wisconsin.

== Electoral history ==
=== Wisconsin Senate (1876, 1878, 1880) ===
Year	Election	Date	Elected				Defeated				Total	Plurality
1876	General	November 7	Joseph Rankin	Democratic	3,848	58.24%	John Schuette	Rep.	2,759	41.76%	6,607	1,089
1878	General	November 5	Joseph Rankin (inc.)	Democratic	2,583	55.46%	Charles Luling	Rep.	2,074	44.54%	4,657	509
1880	General	November 2	Joseph Rankin (inc.)	Democratic	3,731	56.07%	H. H. Smith	Rep.	2,923	43.93%	6,654	808

=== U.S. House of Representatives (1882, 1884) ===
Year	Election	Date	Elected				Defeated				Total	Plurality
1882	General	November 7	Joseph Rankin	Democratic	12,933	62.73%	Levi Howland	Rep.	6,108	29.62%	20,618	6,825
1882	General	November 7	Joseph Rankin	Democratic	12,933	62.73%	R. L. Wing	Proh.	813	3.94%	20,618	6,825
1882	General	November 7	Joseph Rankin	Democratic	12,933	62.73%	John E. Thomas	G'back	764	3.71%	20,618	6,825
1884	General	November 4	Joseph Rankin (inc.)	Democratic	17,851	59.25%	Charles Luling	Rep.	11,610	38.53%	30,129	6,241
1884	General	November 4	Joseph Rankin (inc.)	Democratic	17,851	59.25%	John E. Thomas	G'back	473	1.57%	30,129	6,241
1884	General	November 4	Joseph Rankin (inc.)	Democratic	17,851	59.25%	D. I. Miller	Proh.	126	0.42%	30,129	6,241
1884	General	November 4	Joseph Rankin (inc.)	Democratic	17,851	59.25%	William Miller	Ind.	67	0.22%	30,129	6,241

== See also ==
- List of members of the United States Congress who died in office (1790–1899)

Party political offices
Preceded by Wendell A. Anderson	Chair of the Democratic Party of Wisconsin; January 1, 1878 – January 1, 1880	Succeeded by Alfred C. Parkinson
Wisconsin State Assembly
Preceded by William Aldrich	Member of the Wisconsin State Assembly from the Manitowoc 1st district January 2, 1860 – January 7, 1861	Succeeded by Jabez L. Fobes
Preceded by Carl H. Schmidt	Member of the Wisconsin State Assembly from the Manitowoc 3rd district January 2, 1871 – January 4, 1875	Succeeded by Reuben D. Smart
Wisconsin Senate
Preceded by John Schuette	Member of the Wisconsin Senate from the 15th district January 1, 1877 – January 1, 1883	Succeeded by John Carey
U.S. House of Representatives
Preceded by Edward S. Bragg	Member of the U.S. House of Representatives from Wisconsin's 5th congressional district March 4, 1883 – January 24, 1886	Succeeded by Thomas R. Hudd
