= Avalon, Wisconsin =

- Unincorporated community
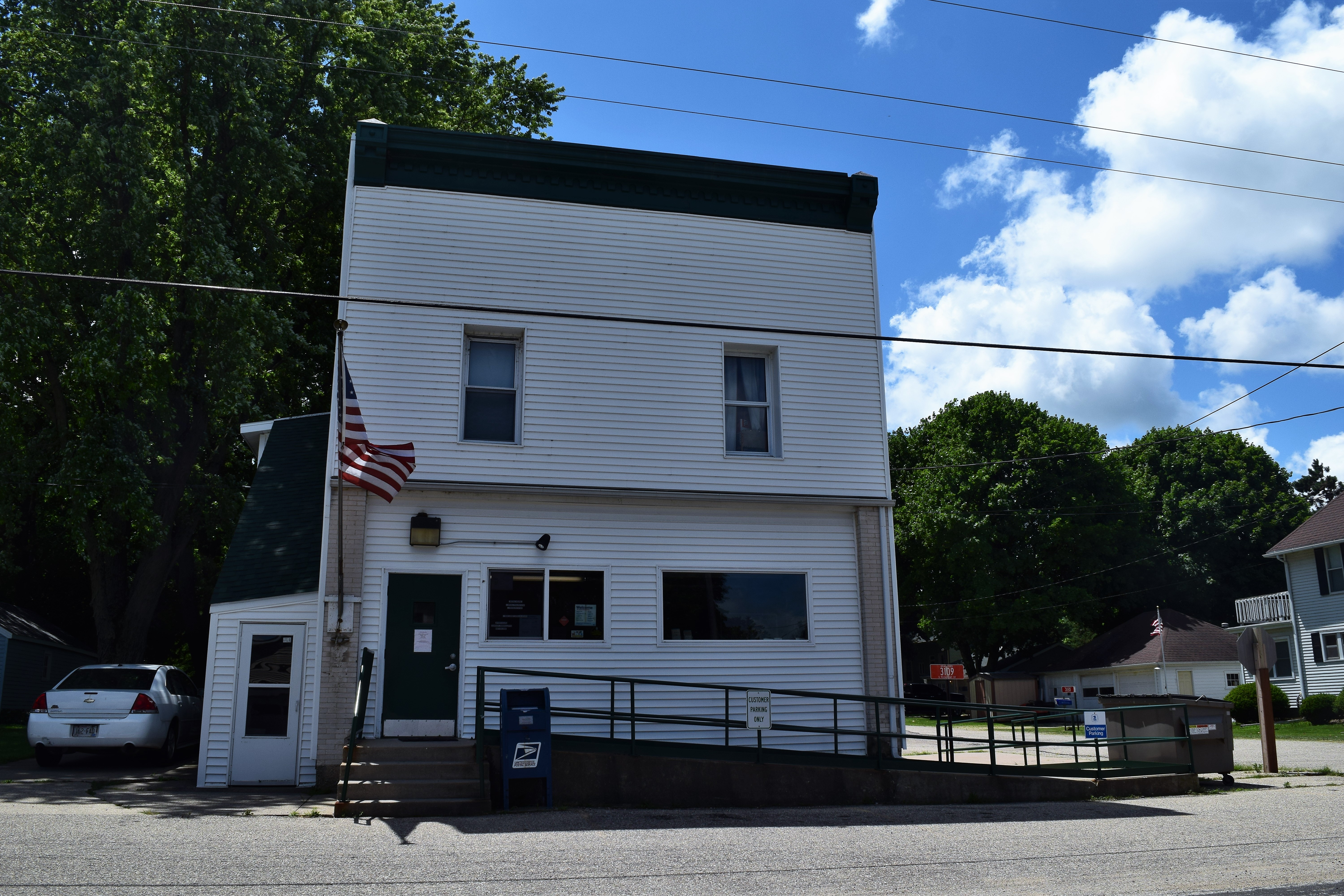
- Avalon post office

- Location within Wisconsin Location within the United States
- Coordinates: 42°37′58″N 88°52′03″W
- Country: United States
- State: Wisconsin
- County: Rock
- Elevation: 958 ft (292 m)
- Time zone: UTC-6 (Central (CST))
  - Summer (DST): UTC-5 (CDT)
- ZIP code: 53505
- Area code: 608
- GNIS feature ID: 1561030

Avalon is an unincorporated community located in the Town of Bradford, Rock County, Wisconsin, United States. It is located along Wisconsin Highway 140, north of Clinton and south of Emerald Grove. Avalon is served by the Wisconsin and Southern Railroad. Avalon has a population of 355 and is east of I-90.
