= Senator Schuette =

Senator Schuette may refer to:

- Bill Schuette (born 1953), Michigan State Senate
- John Schuette (1837–1919), Wisconsin State Senate
