= G. F. A. Atherton =

19th century American politician

Member of the Wisconsin State Assembly from the Rock 1st district
- In office June 5, 1848 – January 1, 1849
- Preceded by: Position established
- Succeeded by: Anson W. Pope

Personal details
- Born: December 31, 1790 Chesterfield, New Hampshire, U.S.
- Died: April 23, 1882 (aged 91) Burlington, Iowa, U.S.
- Resting place: Aspen Grove Cemetery, Burlington, Iowa
- Party: Democratic
- Spouse: Ruthy Bartlett (m. 1818)
- Children: George R. Atherton

George F. A. Atherton (December 31, 1790 – April 23, 1882) was an American politician from Emerald Grove, Wisconsin, who served in the Wisconsin State Assembly after being elected to the 1st Wisconsin Legislature in 1848. He represented the Rock County towns of Bradford and Janesville.

== Early life ==
Atherton was born in Chesterfield, New Hampshire, the son of Dr Oliver Atherton (1755–1812) and Abigail Ladd (1765–1828).

== In the assembly ==
Atherton was a Democrat. He was succeeded in the next session by Anson W. Pope, a Whig.

== After the assembly ==
Atherton was on the board of directors of the Madison and Beloit Railroad Company when that board voted to change its name to the Rock River Valley Union Railroad Company in 1850. He remained on the board until 1854, when a complete reorganization took place. The railroad later became the Madison Division of the Chicago & Northwestern Railroad.

== Personal ==
He served in the U.S. Army and married Ruthy Bartlett as "Major George F. A. Atherton" in Charlestown, New Hampshire, on October 7, 1818.

His son, George R. Atherton (1824–1910), represented Clinton in the 10th Wisconsin Legislature.

His daughter, Frances (1822–1900), married William Wallace White, the son of Phineas White.

He died in Burlington, Iowa, on April 23, 1882, and was buried at Aspen Grove Cemetery in Burlington.
