= Andrew Barlass =

Wisconsin State Representative

Andrew Barlass (September 30, 1822 – July 26, 1895) was a Scottish American farmer and politician.

Born in Kinross, Scotland, Barlass emigrated to the United States and settled in the town of Harmony, Rock County, Wisconsin. His post office address was the community of Emerald Grove. Barlass was a farmer and raised livestock. He served on the Harmony Town Board and was chairman of the town board. He also served on the school board and also served on the Rock County Board of Supervisors. Barlass also served as town assessor and justice of the peace. In 1874, 1875, and 1876, Barlass served in the Wisconsin State Assembly and was a Republican. Barlass was involved with the Free Soil Party before he joined the Republican Party. Barlass was involved with the Harmony town insurance company. Barlass died of injuries after being kicked by a horse on his farm in the town of Harmony.
