= George Atherton =

George Atherton may refer to:

- George W. Atherton (1837–1906), American soldier and educator
- G. F. A. Atherton (George F. A. Atherton, 1790–1882), American state level politician from Wisconsin
- Gee Atherton (George David Atherton, born 1985), English racing cyclist

== See also ==
- George Atherton Aitken (1860–1917), British civil servant, author, scholar and a literary biographer
