= Zerah Mead =

American politician

Zerah Mead (June 4, 1800 – March 23, 1875) was an American politician.

Born in Rutland (town), Vermont, Mead moved to Waddington, New York and worked in a woolen factory from 1825 to 1832. In 1837, Mead moved to Whitewater, Wisconsin Territory. He was appointed a justice of the peace by Governor Henry Dodge. He served in the Wisconsin State Assembly, in 1852, as a Whig.
