= Joseph Spaulding =

American politician

Joseph Spaulding (August 23, 1812 – August 12, 1877) was an American farmer from Rock County, Wisconsin, who spent two one-year terms as a member of the Wisconsin State Assembly from Rock County, first as a Freesoiler and later as a Republican.

== Background ==
Born August 23, 1812 in Bradford County, Pennsylvania, Spaulding left his home state for what was then the far west, and after a brief sojourn in Racine County, Wisconsin, moved to Rock County, where he would remain his entire life. Lucien B. Caswell (later a Republican Congressman from Wisconsin) records an 1837 encounter with Spaulding's preparations for a homestead in Rock County ("on the east border of the prairie, and where the road now leading, from Janesville to Milton passes from the prairie into the openings") in the spring of 1837, at a time when that area was still almost completely unsettled by whites; Spaulding himself had temporarily returned to Ohio. He returned, and is regarded (along with his brother William Spaulding, who built a farm next to his as one of the earliest settlers of the area. In 1839, he married Lydia S. Ellsworth in Berlin, Connecticut; they had four daughters who survived.

From 1842, he was elected to various positions in the Town of Janesville, including road commissioner and member of the school board. In 1845, he and Lydia were of the fifteen founding members of the First Congregational Church of Janesville, and became its first treasurer (or president; sources differ). He was one of the investors in the Janesville-based Central Bank of Wisconsin; and when it was re-organized as the First National Bank of Janesville, he was elected to the bank's board of directors.

Spaulding seems to have been highly regarded by his peers, as he repeatedly served as a judge in various fields at the Wisconsin State Fair: in 1856, he judged sheep ("Long Wool, Middle Wool, Leicester and their Grades"); in 1857, he served on a committee of the Rock County agricultural society and mechanic's institute which evaluated various brands of reaper and mower (bearing such names as "Atkin's Automaton" and "Ketchum's Iron Mower"); and at the 1858 Fair, he served as a judge of "Working Oxen, Milch Cows, and Grade Cattle". In 1862, he was serving as President of the Rock County agricultural society.

== Legislative service ==
In the 1854 session of the Assembly, Spaulding is listed with a post office address of Harmony, Wisconsin; at that time, he is recorded as a member of the newly organized Free Soil Party.

According to the Wisconsin Blue Book entry for the Assembly of 1863, Spaulding was a farmer from Janesville, a native of Pennsylvania, 50 years of age and a Republican.

== Later life and death ==
Spaulding seems to have remained in farming; as late as 1869, he took a second prize of $15 for "Second best pair of carriage horses or mares" at the State Fair.

His daughter Emma Ellsworth Spaulding married Edwin Coe, himself later a Republican member of the Assembly, in September 1865. He died at home August 12, 1877. His name first appears in the 1881-1882 edition of the Transactions of the Wisconsin State Agricultural Society in the "Mortuary" section of the Society's membership list and would continue to appear in years to come, eventually joined by that of William Spaulding.
