= Illinois Route 76 =

Highway in Illinois

Illinois Route 76
- IL 76 highlighted in red

Route information
- Maintained by IDOT
- Length: 15.77 mi (25.38 km)
- Existed: 1924–present

Major junctions
- South end: US 20 Bus. in Belvidere
- North end: WIS 140 in Capron

Location
- Country: United States
- State: Illinois
- Counties: Boone

Highway system
- Illinois State Highway System; Interstate; US; State; Tollways; Scenic
← IL 75	→ IL 78

Illinois Route 76 (IL 76) is a north–south state highway in far north-central Illinois. It runs from the US 20 Bus. in Belvidere north to the Wisconsin State Line at State Trunk Highway 140. This is a distance of 15.77 miles (25.38 km).

== Route description ==
Illinois 76 is an undivided two-lane rural highway for its entire length. Starting in US 20 Bus. in Belvidere, IL 76 travels north. It then intersects Illinois Route 173 near Poplar Grove. At the Wisconsin state line, IL 76 curves west. As soon as the road curves north, it enters Wisconsin. At that point, the road becomes WIS 140.

== History ==
Initially, only the section between IL 173 and US 20/IL 5 (now mostly US 20 Bus.) in downtown Belvidere was signed as IL 76. In 1935, IL 76 extended north to the state line. Also, IL 76 was slightly truncated due to the rerouting of US 20. Also, IL 5 then only appeared on the former stretch of US 20 from Rockford to Belvidere. Since 1967, part of IL 5 became part of US 20. Another truncation happened in Belvidere. Since 1989, US 20 Bus. bypassed downtown Belvidere. As a result, IL 76 no longer ended in downtown but instead ended north of downtown.

== Major intersections ==
The entire route is in Boone County.

Location	mi	km	Destinations	Notes
Belvidere	0.00	0.00	US 20 Bus. / I-90 Alt.	Southern terminus of IL 76.
Poplar Grove	6.9	11.1	IL 173 – Argyle, Harvard	
Capron	15.77	25.38	WIS 140 – Clinton	Northern terminus of IL 76; Wisconsin state line
1.000 mi = 1.609 km; 1.000 km = 0.621 mi
