= Lyons (community), Wisconsin =

Census-designated place in Wisconsin, United States

Lyons, Wisconsin
- Unincorporated community and census-designated place
- Location within Wisconsin Location within the United States
- Coordinates: 42°39′04″N 88°21′30″W
- Country: United States
- State: Wisconsin
- County: Walworth
- Elevation: 801 ft (244 m)

Population (2020)
  - Total: 932
- Time zone: UTC-6 (Central (CST))
  - Summer (DST): UTC-5 (CDT)
- ZIP code: 53148
- Area code: 262
- GNIS feature ID: 1568851

Lyons is an unincorporated community and census-designated place located in the town of Lyons, in Walworth County, Wisconsin, United States. Lyons is located on Wisconsin Highway 36, 4.5 miles (7.2 km) west-southwest of Burlington. Lyons has a post office with ZIP code 53148. It was first named a CDP at the 2020 census, which showed a population of 932.

== Demographics ==
Historical population
Census	Pop.	Note	%±
2020	932		—
U.S. Decennial Census
