= James Menzies (Wisconsin politician) =

American politician

James Menzies (September 3, 1830 – March 22, 1913) was a Scottish American farmer and politician.

Born in Newtown of Tullymet, Perthshire, Scotland, Menzies emigrated to the United States in 1841 and settled in the town of Harmony, Rock County, Wisconsin Territory. He lived in Dane County, Wisconsin for seven years before returning to the town of Harmony and was a farmer. He was chairman of the Harmony Town Board and served on the Rock County Board of Supervisors. Menzies also served as the town superintendent of public schools. In 1881, Menzies served in the Wisconsin State Assembly and was a Republican. Menzies died at his home in the town of Harmony as a result of ill health.
