= Charles Augustus Davis =

American politician

Charles Augustus Davis was a member of the Wisconsin State Assembly in 1881 and 1882. He was a Republican. Davis was born on November 6, 1828.
