= Emerald Grove, Wisconsin =

- Unincorporated community
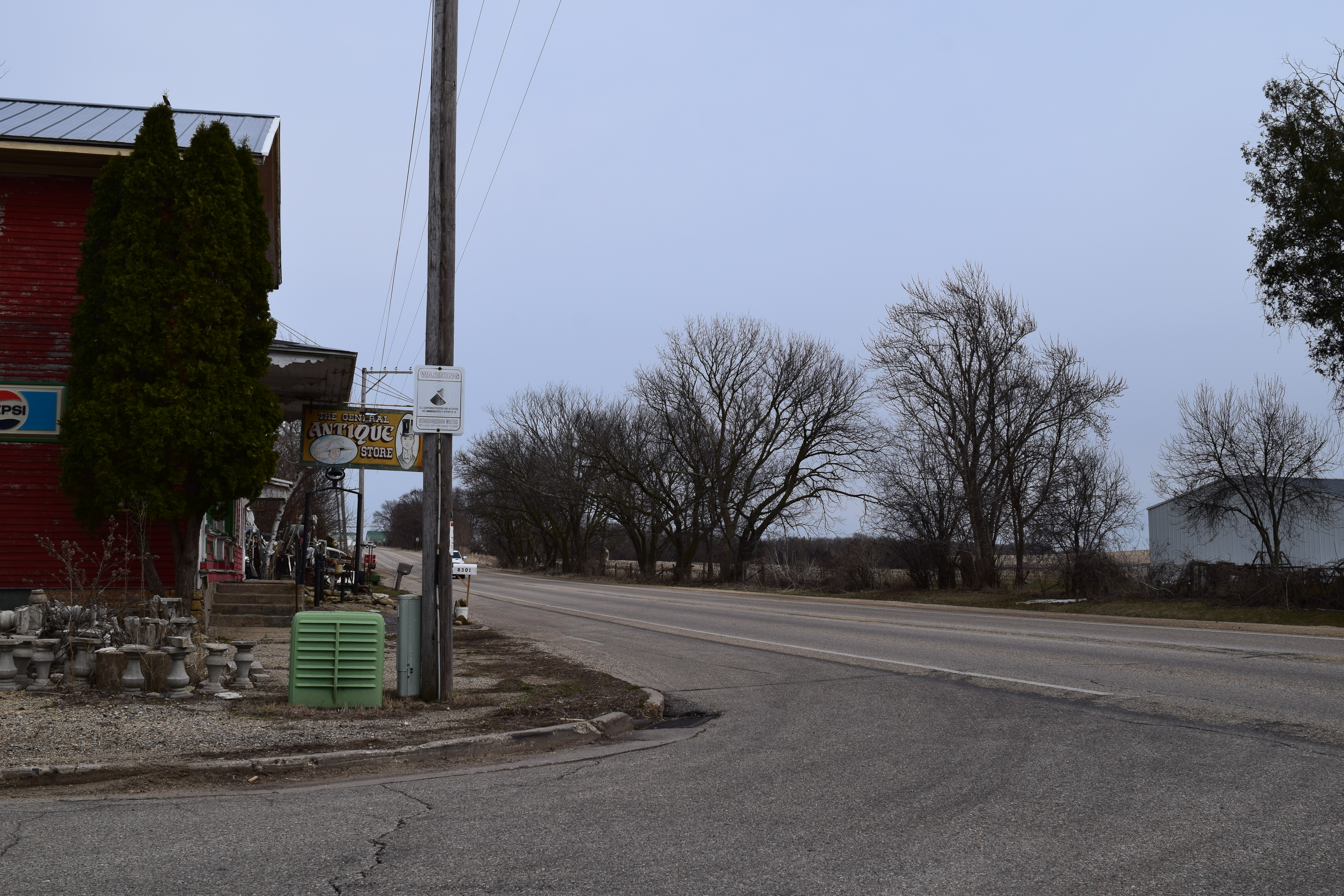
- Looking east along U.S. Route 14 in Emerald Grove

- Location within Wisconsin Location within the United States
- Coordinates: 42°39′22″N 88°52′50″W
- Country: United States
- State: Wisconsin
- County: Rock
- Elevation: 899 ft (274 m)
- Time zone: UTC-6 (Central (CST))
  - Summer (DST): UTC-5 (CDT)
- Area code: 608
- GNIS feature ID: 1564611

Emerald Grove is an unincorporated community in the Town of Bradford, in Rock County, Wisconsin, United States. It is located along U.S. Route 14 and Wisconsin Highway 11, east of Janesville and west of Delavan.

== Notable people ==
- G. F. A. Atherton, member of the Wisconsin State Assembly in the 1st Wisconsin Legislature in 1848, and later a railroad director
- Andrew Barlass, member of the Wisconsin State Assembly (1874–76)
- William Gardiner, member of the Wisconsin State Assembly (1879)
