= Ira B. Bradford =

American politician (1851–1916)

Member of the Wisconsin State Assembly
- In office 1880–1882

Member of the Wisconsin State Assembly
- In office 1902–1903

Personal details
- Born: June 24, 1851 Fulton, Wisconsin
- Died: September 1, 1916 (aged 65) Augusta, Wisconsin
- Party: Republican
- Spouse: Allie M. Burnham
- Relations: William Bradford
- Children: Archie E, Bradford; Sadie M. Bradford
- Profession: Lawyer, Banker, Politician

Ira B. Bradford (June 24, 1851 – September 1, 1916) was an American lawyer, banker and politician. He served as a Republican member of the Wisconsin State Assembly in the late 1880s and early 1900s.

== Early life and career ==
Bradford was born in Fulton, Wisconsin, and was raised and educated in New Hampshire. He was admitted to the bar in Monroe, Wisconsin in 1873, he and took up residence in Augusta, Wisconsin. He helped establish the Augusta State Bank in 1875 and served as director.

== Political career ==
Bradford was elected to the assembly in 1880 and was reelected in 1881. During his second term he served as Speaker of the assembly, making him the youngest person to serve as Speaker at the time. Bradford declined to run for reelection at the end of his second term.

He was elected the first mayor of Augusta in 1885, where he was also Village Attorney. Bradford was a candidate for governor in 1899, and in 1902 he was again elected to the assembly.

== Personal life ==
Bradford was related to Massachusetts Colonial Governor William Bradford. He was married to Allie M. Burnham and they had two children, Archie E, Bradford and Sadie M. Bradford. He died in Augusta following a lingering illness.
