= William Pierron =

American politician

William Pierron was a Republican member of the Wisconsin State Assembly from Milwaukee for two terms (1881 and 1891).
