= John Carey (Wisconsin politician) =

American politician (1839–1888)

John Carey (April 1, 1839 – June 20, 1888) was an American farmer from Osman, Wisconsin who served as a Democratic member of the Wisconsin State Assembly and the Wisconsin State Senate.

== Background ==
Carey was born in Ireland on April 1, 1839. His family emigrated to America in 1844, and settled in Albany, New York, where he received a public school education. They lived there until 1852, when they came to Wisconsin and settled in Manitowoc County. Carey became a farmer.

== Public office ==
Carey was a member of the Manitowoc County board of supervisors in 1862-1865; and was a candidate for sheriff in 1864.

In 1870 he ran for state senator from Manitowoc County as a Republican, losing with 1411 votes to 2141 for Democratic State Representative Carl Schmidt and 1011 for William Bach, running on the "People's Party" ticket.

He served as town clerk in 1871-72; was chairman of his town board for six years, and chairman of the county board in 1881, 1884 and 1885.

=== Legislature ===
He was elected to the Assembly's First Manitowoc County district in 1878 as a Democrat (Democratic incumbent Thomas Thornton was not a candidate for re-election), with 1240 votes to 399 for Republican William Cary.

He was reelected in 1879, with 991 votes to 632 for Republican S. E. Johnson. and was elected state senator for the Fifteenth District (Manitowoc County) in 1882. He was re-elected in 1886, receiving 3,222 votes, against 2,853 votes for Republican Fred Schutte. In 1888, the 15th District had been modified to include Kewaunee County; Carey was not a candidate for re-election and was succeeded by fellow Democrat William F. Nash.

Carey died at his home in Meeme, Wisconsin at the age of 49.
