= Anson W. Pope =

American politician

Anson Waterman Pope (June 30, 1812 – October 5, 1871) was an American who served three discontinuous one-year terms as a member of the Wisconsin State Assembly, in 1849 as a Whig, and in 1861 and 1866 as a Republican, while living in Janesville, Wisconsin. He spent his last few years as an orchardist in Cedar County, Missouri.

His daughter Ada was married at one time to the conman James Addison Reavis, the self-styled "Baron of Arizona".
