= William Gardiner (Wisconsin politician) =

American politician

William Gardiner was a member of the Wisconsin State Assembly.

== Biography ==
Gardiner was born on September 3, 1826, in Gloucestershire, England. In 1860, he married Carrie Dockstader. They would have nine children. Gardiner and much of his family were Congregationalists.

== Career ==
Gardiner was elected to the Assembly in 1878. Additionally, he was Chairman (similar to Mayor) of Bradford, Wisconsin and Chairman of the County Board of Rock County, Wisconsin. He was a Republican.
