= William Meadows =

American politician

William Meadows (July 6, 1833 – April 5, 1920) was an American farmer, businessman, and politician.

Born in Bolton, Lancashire, England, Meadows emigrated with his parents to the United States in 1842 and settled in Burlington Flats, New York, within the town of Burlington, Otsego County, New York. In 1850, Meadows settled in Burlington, Wisconsin. He then moved to the town of Lyons, Walworth County, Wisconsin in 1855. Meadows was a farmer and wool broker. In 1878, he bought interest in the Burlington Brick and Title Company and was the general manager. He was involved with the local agricultural society and served as president of the society. From 1876 to 1878, Meadows served as chairman of the Lyons Town Board and was a Republican. In 1881, Meadows served in the Wisconsin State Assembly. Meadows died at his home in Burlington, Wisconsin from pneumonia after coming down with a cold.
