= Whitewater (town), Wisconsin =

Town in Walworth County, Wisconsin

Whitewater, Wisconsin
- Town
- Town of Whitewater
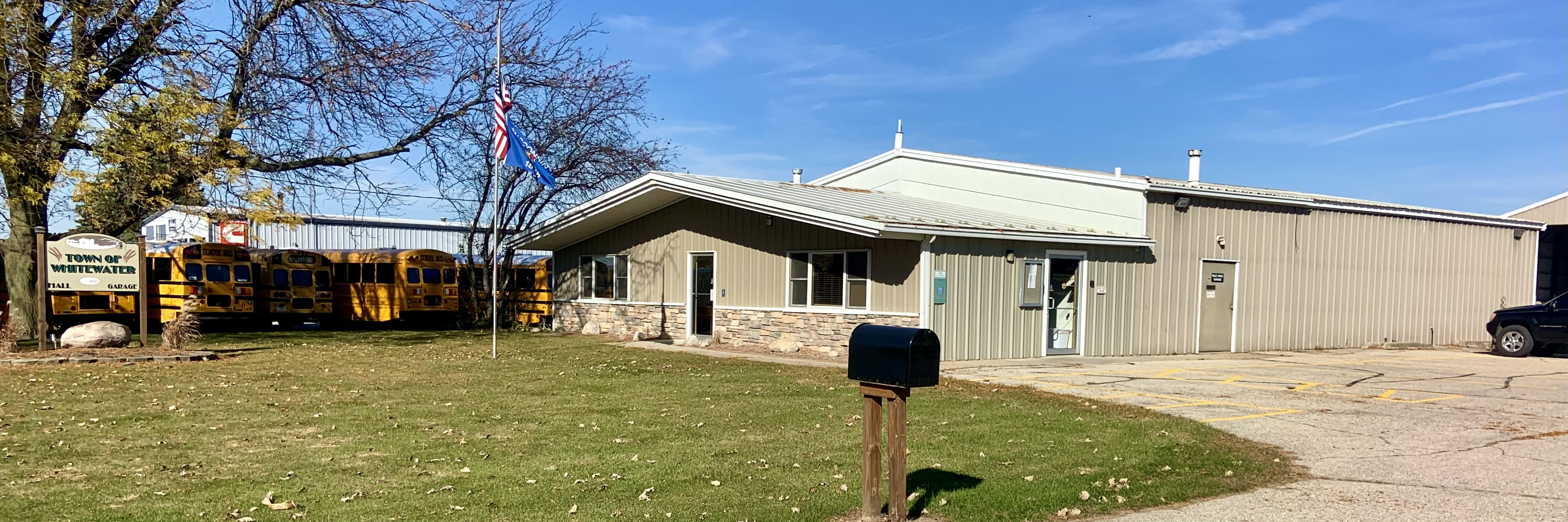
- Whitewater Town Hall

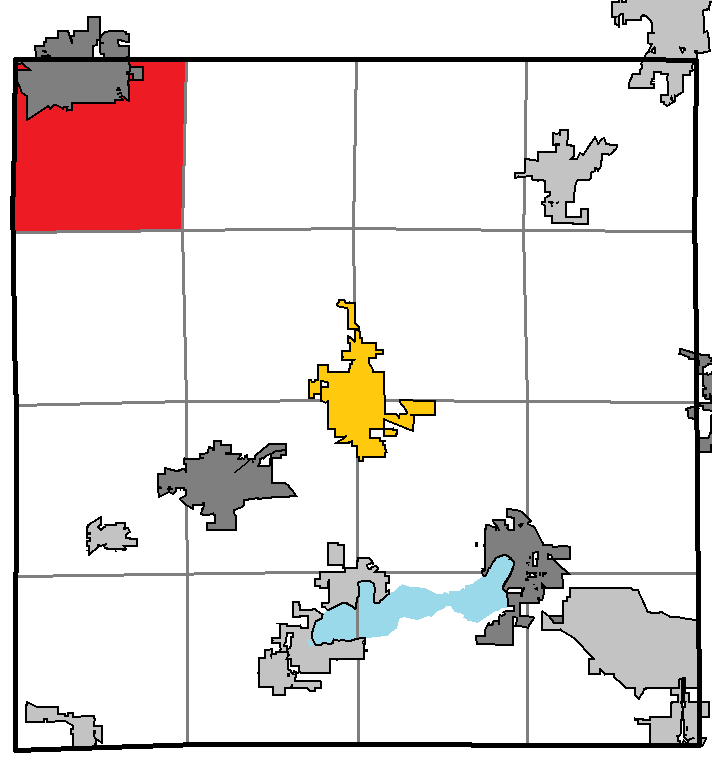
- Location of Whitewater, within Walworth County

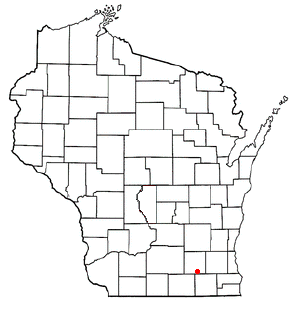
- Location of Whitewater, Wisconsin
- Coordinates: 42°47′32″N 88°42′57″W
- Country: United States
- State: Wisconsin
- County: Walworth

Area
  - Total: 29.63 sq mi (76.7 km^{2})
  - Land: 28.63 sq mi (74.2 km^{2})
  - Water: 1.0 sq mi (2.6 km^{2})

Population (2020)
  - Total: 1,433
  - Density: 50.05/sq mi (19.33/km^{2})
- Time zone: UTC-6 (Central (CST))
  - Summer (DST): UTC-5 (CDT)
- Area code: 262
- GNIS feature ID: 1584433

Whitewater is a town in Walworth County, Wisconsin, United States. The population was 1,433 at the 2020 census.

== Geography ==
According to the United States Census Bureau, the town has a total area of 30.6 square miles (79.3 km^{2}), of which 29.6 square miles (76.7 km^{2}) is land and 1.0 square mile (2.5 km^{2}) (3.17%) is water.

== Demographics ==
At the 2000 United States census there were 1,399 people, 552 households, and 432 families in the town. The population density was 47.2 people per square mile (18.2/km^{2}). There were 829 housing units at an average density of 28.0 per square mile (10.8/km^{2}). The racial makeup of the town was 97.71% White, 0.14% African American, 0.71% Asian, 0.43% from other races, and 1.00% from two or more races. Hispanics or Latinos of any race were 1.64%.

Of the 552 households, 27.4% had children under the age of 18 living with them, 71.6% were married couples living together, 4.0% had a female householder with no husband present, and 21.6% were non-families. 15.9% of households were one person and 4.3% were one person aged 65 or older. The average household size was 2.53 and the average family size was 2.82.

The age distribution was 20.8% under the age of 18, 5.9% from 18 to 24, 25.1% from 25 to 44, 32.0% from 45 to 64, and 16.2% were 65 or older. The median age was 44 years. For every 100 females, there were 106.6 males. For every 100 females age 18 and over, there were 104.8 males.

The median household income was $59,946 and the median family income was $64,583. Males had a median income of $46,118 versus $35,208 for females. The per capita income for the town was $28,422. About 0.9% of families and 2.6% of the population were below the poverty line, including 3.2% of those under age 18 and none of those age 65 or over.

== Notable people ==
- Newton Littlejohn, Wisconsin legislator
- Zerah Mead, Wisconsin legislator, lived in the town
