= Peter Johnston (Wisconsin politician) =

19th century American politician

Member of the Wisconsin State Assembly from the Manitowoc 3rd district
- In office January 1, 1877 – January 7, 1878
- Preceded by: William F. Tisch
- Succeeded by: Henry Vits

1st Mayor of Manitowoc, Wisconsin
- In office April 1870 – April 1872
- Preceded by: Position established
- Succeeded by: Charles Luling

Personal details
- Born: January 19, 1831 Dunblane, Scotland, UK
- Died: October 3, 1904 (aged 73) Charlevoix County, Michigan, U.S.
- Resting place: Evergreen Cemetery, Manitowoc, Wisconsin
- Party: Republican

Peter Johnston (January 19, 1831 – October 3, 1904) was a Scottish American immigrant, businessman, and Republican politician. He was the first mayor of Manitowoc, Wisconsin, and represented Manitowoc County in the Wisconsin State Assembly during the 1877 session.

== Biography ==
Johnston was born on January 19, 1831, in Dunblane, Scotland. Later, he resided in Milwaukee, Wisconsin, before settling in Manitowoc, Wisconsin, in 1857. He died on October 3, 1904.

== Political career ==
Johnston was a member of the Assembly during the 1877 session. From 1870 to 1872, he was Mayor of Manitowoc. Additionally, Johnston was a member of the Manitowoc City Council and the Manitowoc County Board of Supervisors. He was a Republican.
