= Roswell H. Tripp =

American politician

Roswell H. Tripp (January 12, 1840 – September 3, 1883) was a member of the Wisconsin State Assembly.

== Biography ==
Tripp was born on January 12, 1840, in Jefferson County, New York. During the American Civil War, he enlisted with the 27th Wisconsin Volunteer Infantry Regiment of the Union Army. He achieved the rank of first lieutenant. Incidents Tripp took part in include the Battle of Okolona, Battle of Prairie D'Ane, the Battle of Jenkins' Ferry, the Siege of Vicksburg and the Battle of Spanish Fort. On April 28, 1867, Tripp married Charlotte Daharsh. They had three children. He died on September 3, 1883, in Hingham, Wisconsin.

== Assembly career ==
Tripp was a member of the Assembly in 1881. He was a Republican.
