= Reuben D. Smart =

American politician

Reuben D. Smart (December 24, 1832 – June 6, 1890) was an American lumberman and politician.

Born in Saint Patrick Parish, Charlotte County, New Brunswick, Canada, Smart emigrated to the United States in 1855 and settled in Manitowoc, Wisconsin. Smart was in the lumber business. In 1872, Smart was elected sheriff of Manitowoc County, Wisconsin and was a Republican. In 1875, Smart served in the Wisconsin State Assembly. Smart served as Manitowoc County judge and was appointed postmaster of Manitowoc by President Benjamin Harrison. He also served as deputy collector of internal revenue. Smart died in Manitowoc, Wisconsin; he had one of his legs amputated by a surgeon in Oshkosh, Wisconsin.
