= Lyons, Wisconsin =

Town of Lyons, Wisconsin
- Town
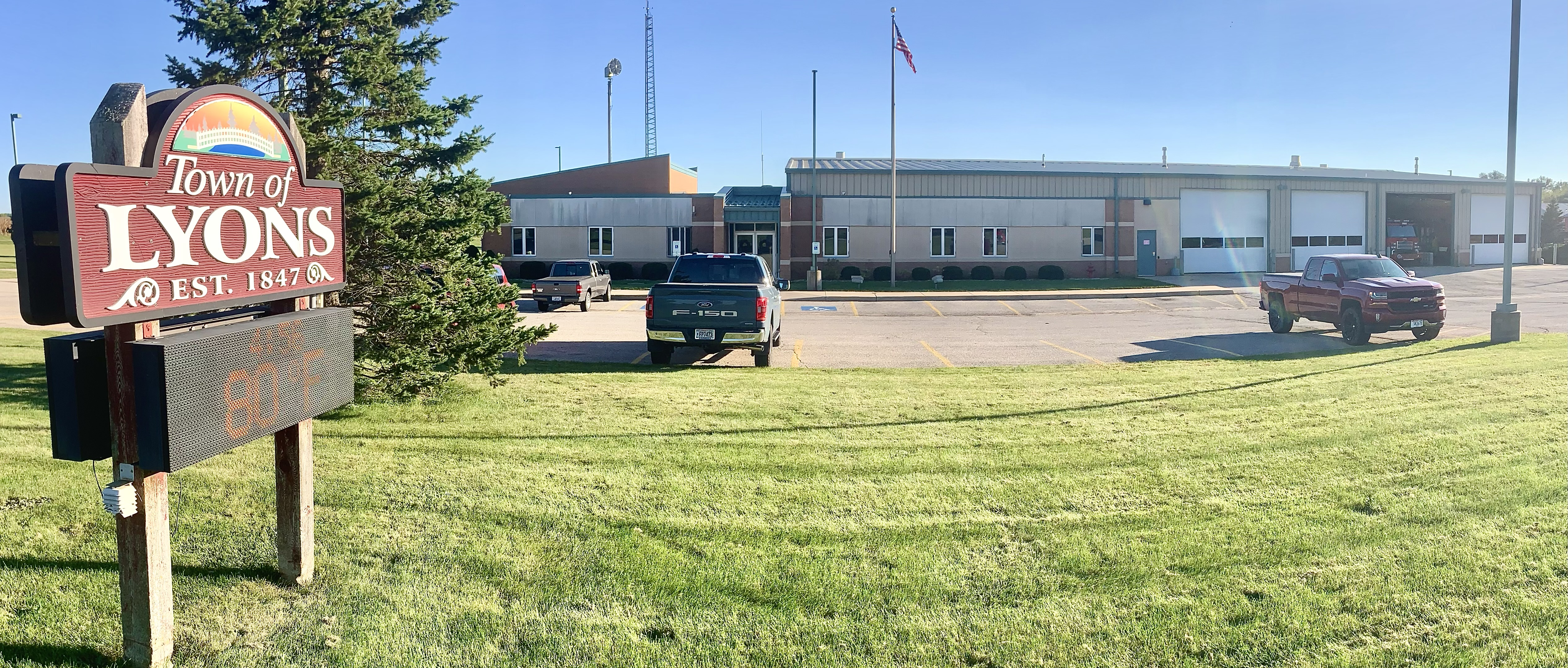
- Town hall

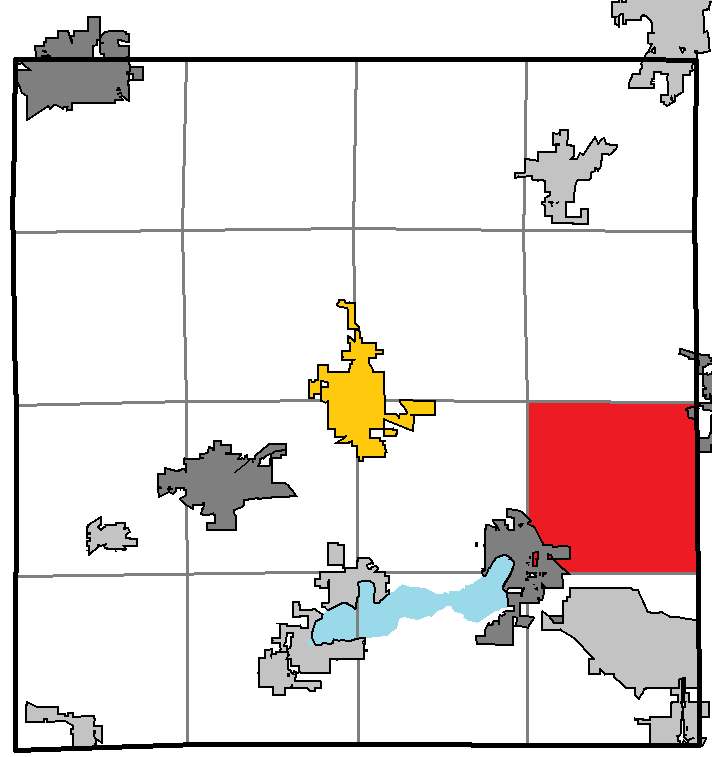
- Location of Lyons, within Walworth County

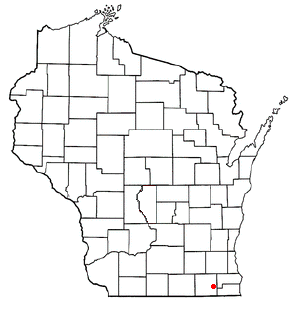
- Location of the Town of Lyons, Wisconsin
- Coordinates: 42°38′0″N 88°22′20″W
- Country: United States
- State: Wisconsin
- County: Walworth

Area
  - Total: 34.7 sq mi (89.9 km^{2})
  - Land: 34.5 sq mi (89.3 km^{2})
  - Water: 0.23 sq mi (0.6 km^{2})
- Elevation: 814 ft (248 m)

Population (2020)
  - Total: 3,648
  - Density: 100/sq mi (38.5/km^{2})
- Time zone: UTC-6 (Central (CST))
  - Summer (DST): UTC-5 (CDT)
- Area code: 262
- FIPS code: 55-46725
- GNIS feature ID: 1583618

Lyons is a town in Walworth County, Wisconsin, United States. The population was 3,648 at the 2020 census. The unincorporated communities of Lyons and Springfield are located within the town.

== History ==
It was originally created as Hudson by the legislature of the Wisconsin Territory on January 23, 1844.

== Geography ==
According to the United States Census Bureau, the town has a total area of 34.7 square miles (89.9 km^{2}), of which 34.5 square miles (89.3 km^{2}) is land and 0.2 square miles (0.6 km^{2}) is water.

== Demographics ==
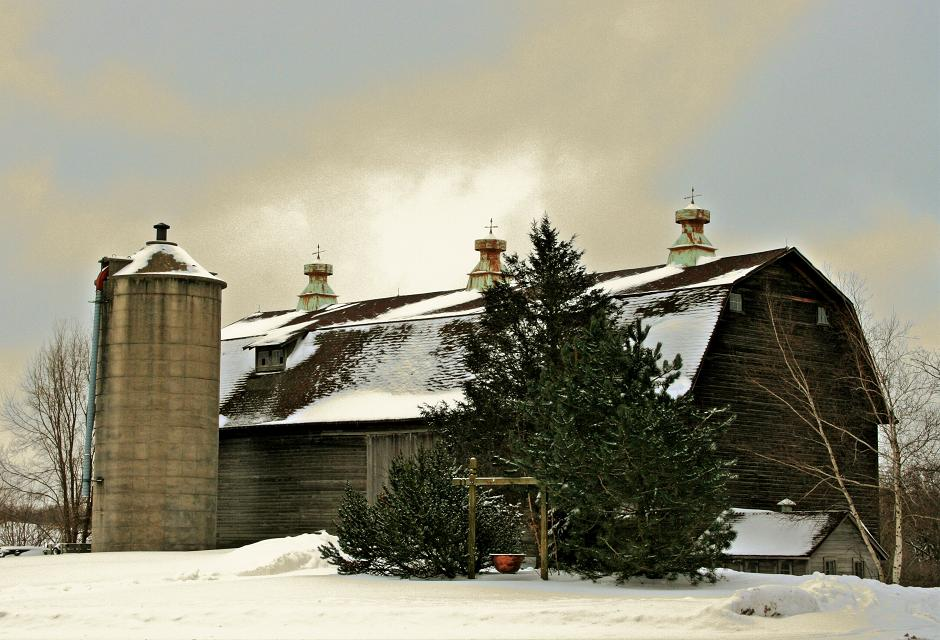
Barn in Lyons, WI

As of the census of 2000, there were 3,440 people, 1,231 households, and 940 families residing in the town. The population density was 99.8 people per square mile (38.5/km^{2}). There were 1,307 housing units at an average density of 37.9 per square mile (14.6/km^{2}). The racial makeup of the town was 97.62% White, 0.32% African American, 0.23% Native American, 0.35% Asian, 0.03% Pacific Islander, 0.44% from other races, and 1.02% from two or more races. Hispanic or Latino of any race were 2.15% of the population.

There were 1,231 households, out of which 33.6% had children under the age of 18 living with them, 65.2% were married couples living together, 7.6% had a female householder with no husband present, and 23.6% were non-families. 19.0% of all households were made up of individuals, and 5.9% had someone living alone who was 65 years of age or older. The average household size was 2.72 and the average family size was 3.12.

In the town, the population was spread out, with 26.4% under the age of 18, 6.2% from 18 to 24, 28.6% from 25 to 44, 25.6% from 45 to 64, and 13.2% who were 65 years of age or older. The median age was 39 years. For every 100 females, there were 99.8 males. For every 100 females age 18 and over, there were 97.7 males.

The median income for a household in the town was $55,741, and the median income for a family was $61,077. Males had a median income of $42,583 versus $28,113 for females. The per capita income for the town was $23,389. About 2.0% of families and 4.1% of the population were below the poverty line, including 2.1% of those under age 18 and 13.4% of those age 65 or over.

== Economy ==
Wag-Aero, an aircraft parts company, is in Lyons.

== Transportation ==
Lyons was a stop on the Racine & Southwestern branch line of the Chicago, Milwaukee, St. Paul and Pacific Railroad, better known as the Milwaukee Road. In its 1980 bankruptcy, the Milwaukee Road disposed of the Southwestern Line, and the line through Lyons did not survive.

== Notable people ==
- William Meadows, Wisconsin State Representative, businessman, and farmer, lived in Lyons; Meadows served as the Lyons Town Board chairman
