= Bradford, Wisconsin =

Town of Bradford, Wisconsin
- Town
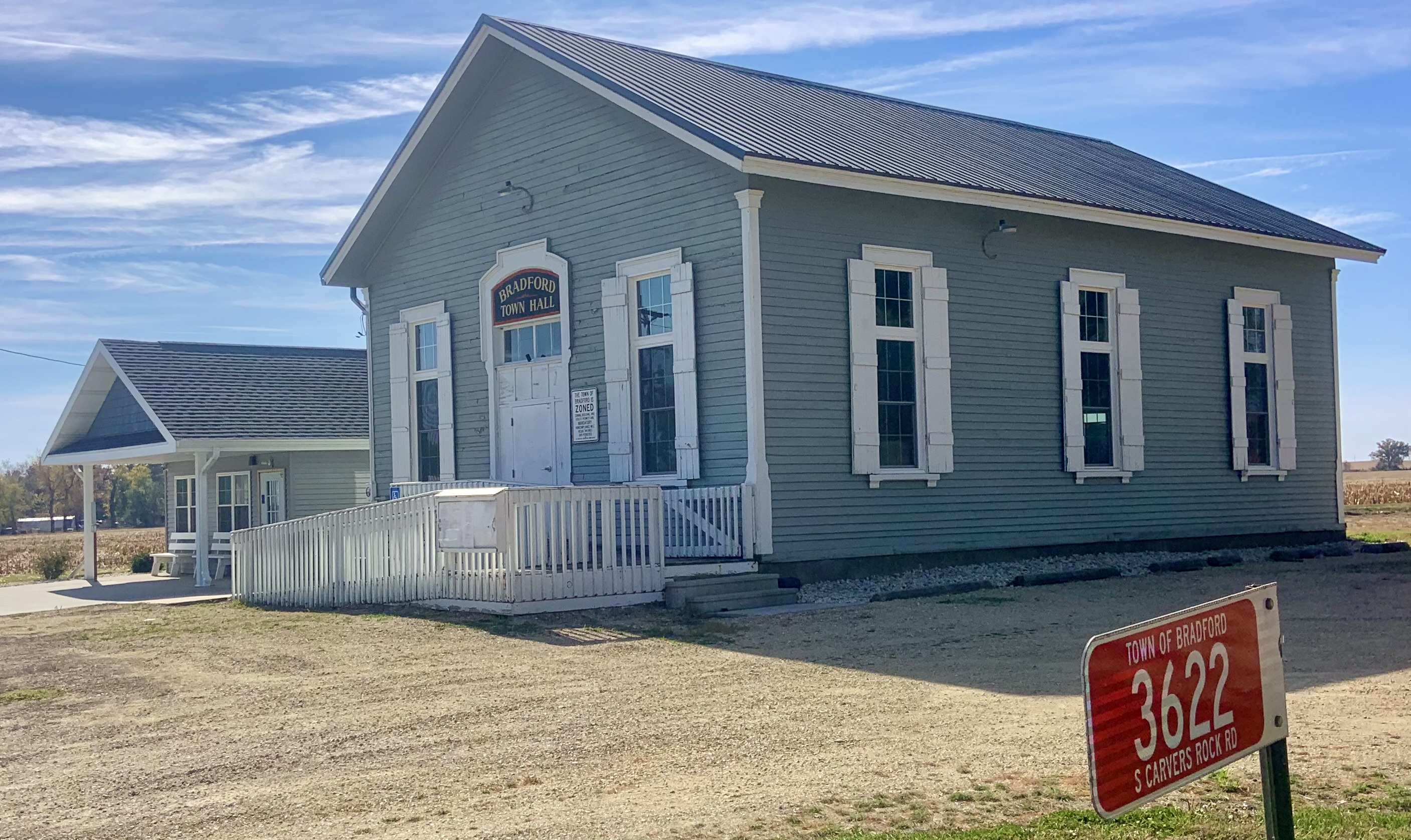
- Town hall

- Location in Rock County and the state of Wisconsin.
- Coordinates: 42°37′25″N 88°49′46″W
- Country: United States
- State: Wisconsin
- County: Rock

Area
  - Total: 36.3 sq mi (94.0 km^{2})
  - Land: 36.3 sq mi (94.0 km^{2})
  - Water: 0 sq mi (0.0 km^{2})
- Elevation: 932 ft (284 m)

Population (2020)
  - Total: 1,013
  - Density: 28/sq mi (10.7/km^{2})
- Time zone: UTC-6 (Central (CST))
  - Summer (DST): UTC-5 (CDT)
- Area code: 608
- FIPS code: 55-09175
- GNIS feature ID: 1582850
- Website: http://www.townofbradfordwi.com

The Town of Bradford is located in Rock County, Wisconsin, United States. The population was 1,013 at the 2020 census. The unincorporated communities of Avalon and Emerald Grove are located within the town. The unincorporated community of Fairfield is also located partially in the town. The town was named by William C. Chase, one of the original settlers, for his birthplace in Orange County, Vermont.

== Geography ==
According to the United States Census Bureau, the town has a total area of 36.3 square miles (94.0 km^{2}), all land.

== Demographics ==
As of the 2000 census, there were 1,007 people, 379 households, and 280 families residing in the town. The population density was 27.7 people per square mile (10.7/km^{2}). There were 398 housing units at an average density of 11.0 per square mile (4.2/km^{2}). The racial makeup of the town was 96.62% White, 2.88% from other races, and 0.50% from two or more races. Hispanic or Latino of any race were 5.36% of the population.

There were 379 households, out of which 33.2% had children under the age of 18 living with them, 63.3% were married couples living together, 6.3% had a female householder with no husband present, and 26.1% were non-families. 19.5% of all households were made up of individuals, and 8.2% had someone living alone who was 65 years of age or older. The average household size was 2.66 and the average family size was 3.10.

In the town, the population was spread out, with 26.2% under the age of 18, 6.4% from 18 to 24, 30.1% from 25 to 44, 27.1% from 45 to 64, and 10.2% who were 65 years of age or older. The median age was 37 years. For every 100 females, there were 108.1 males. For every 100 females age 18 and over, there were 103.6 males.

The median income for a household in the town was $51,324, and the median income for a family was $58,036. Males had a median income of $37,292 versus $24,931 for females. The per capita income for the town was $23,440. About 3.9% of families and 6.9% of the population were below the poverty line, including 10.3% of those under age 18 and none of those age 65 or over.

== Notable people ==
- William Gardiner, Wisconsin State Representative, lived in the town
- George W. Latta, Wisconsin State Representative and lawyer, was born in the town

== See also ==
- List of towns in Wisconsin
