= Harmony, Rock County, Wisconsin =

Town of Harmony
- Town
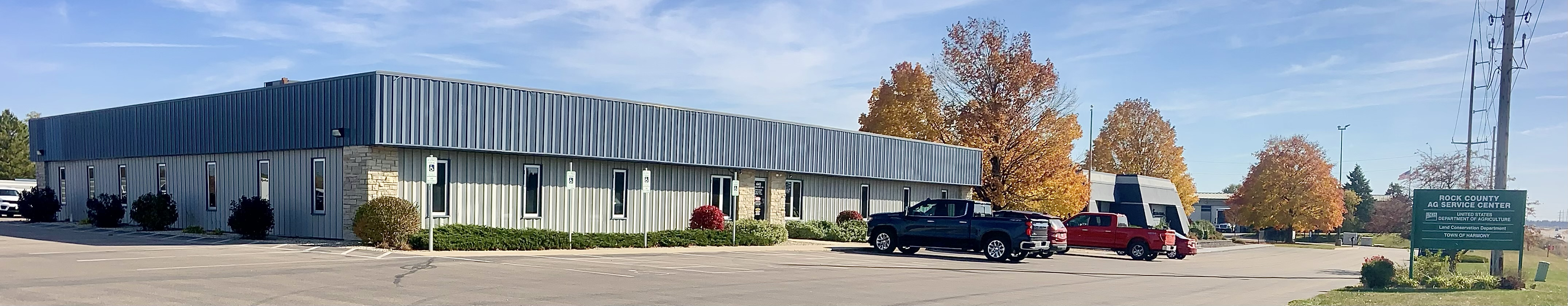
- Town hall

- Location of the Town of Harmony in Rock County and the state of Wisconsin.
- Coordinates: 42°43′43″N 88°57′42″W
- Country: United States
- State: Wisconsin
- County: Rock

Area
  - Total: 24.0 sq mi (62.2 km^{2})
  - Land: 23.9 sq mi (62.0 km^{2})
  - Water: 0.039 sq mi (0.1 km^{2})
- Elevation: 912 ft (278 m)

Population (2020)
  - Total: 2,569
  - Density: 98/sq mi (37.9/km^{2})
- Time zone: UTC-6 (Central (CST))
  - Summer (DST): UTC-5 (CDT)
- Area code: 608
- FIPS code: 55-32700
- GNIS feature ID: 1583351
- Website: https://townofharmonyrc.gov/

The Town of Harmony is a town located in Rock County, Wisconsin, United States. The population was 2,569 at the 2020 census. The city of Janesville is adjacent to the town.

== Geography ==
According to the United States Census Bureau, the town has a total area of 24.0 square miles (62.2 km^{2}), of which 24.0 square miles (62.0 km^{2}) is land and 0.1 square mile (0.1 km^{2}) (0.21%) is water.

== Demographics ==
At the 2000 census there were 2,351 people, 787 households, and 688 families in the town. The population density was 98.1 people per square mile (37.9/km^{2}). There were 802 housing units at an average density of 33.5 per square mile (12.9/km^{2}). The racial makeup of the town was 98.26% White, 0.47% African American, 0.04% Native American, 0.85% Asian, 0.04% from other races, and 0.34% from two or more races. Hispanic or Latino of any race were 0.68%.

Of the 787 households 44.1% had children under the age of 18 living with them, 80.7% were married couples living together, 3.8% had a female householder with no husband present, and 12.5% were non-families. 9.7% of households were one person and 2.7% were one person aged 65 or older. The average household size was 2.97 and the average family size was 3.19.

The age distribution was 29.4% under the age of 18, 6.3% from 18 to 24, 27.8% from 25 to 44, 29.1% from 45 to 64, and 7.4% 65 or older. The median age was 38 years. For every 100 females, there were 107.1 males. For every 100 females age 18 and over, there were 103.3 males.

The median household income was $73,173 and the median family income was $77,206. Males had a median income of $44,784 versus $29,653 for females. The per capita income for the town was $25,244. None of the families and 0.7% of the population were living below the poverty line, including no under eighteens and 3.9% of those over 64.

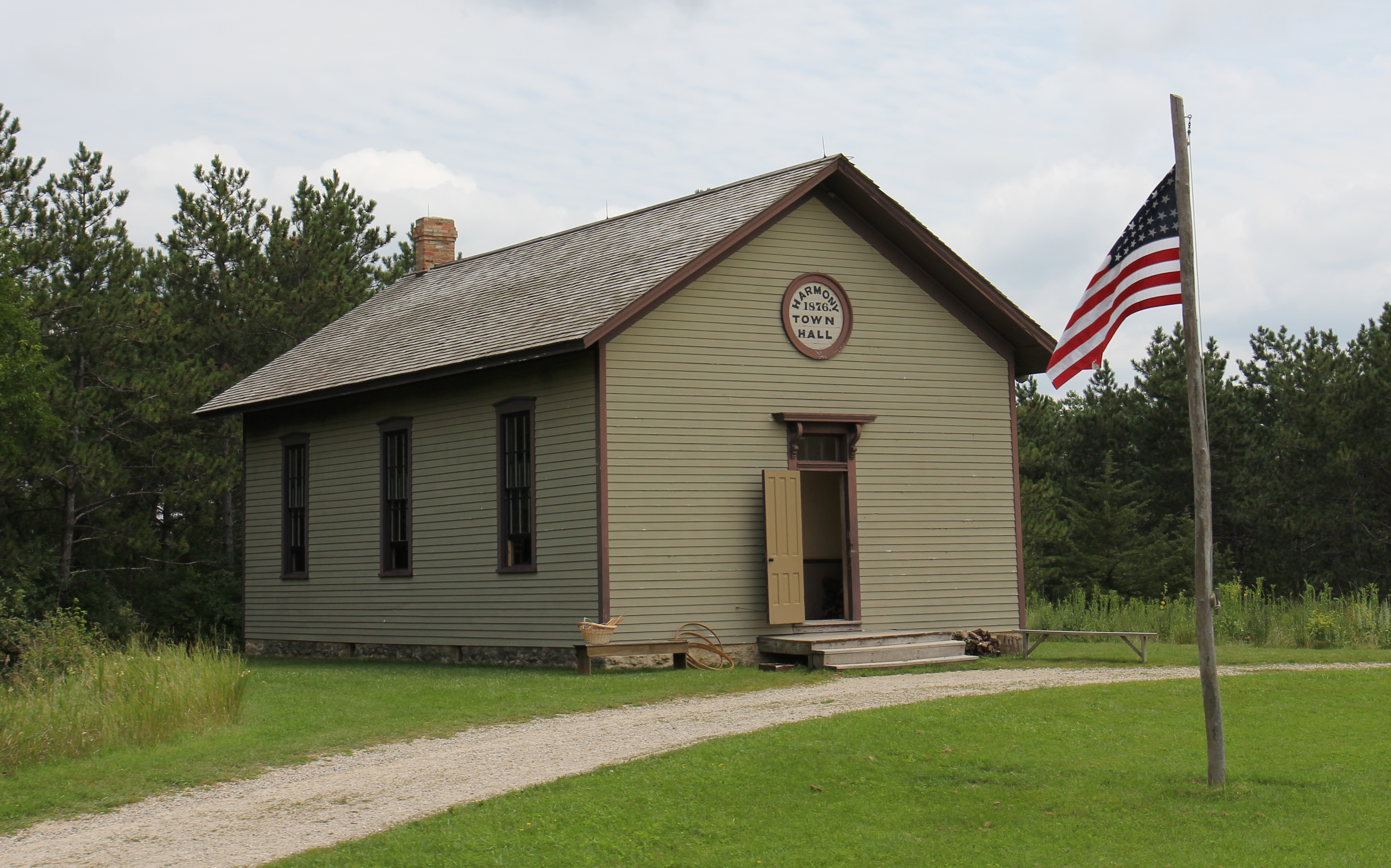
1876 town hall on display at Old World Wisconsin

== Notable people ==
- James Menzies, Wisconsin legislator
- Joseph Spaulding, Wisconsin legislator
- George H. Williston, Wisconsin legislator
