= John Schuette =

American politician

John Schuette was an American politician. He was a member of the Wisconsin State Senate.

== Biography ==
Schuette was born on September 25, 1837, in Oldenburg, Germany. He moved to Cedarburg, Wisconsin, in 1848.

In 1867, Schuette married Rosa Stauss. They would have five children before her death in 1904. Schuette died of a myocardial infarction on December 20, 1919, in Manitowoc, Wisconsin.

== Career ==
Schuette was a member of the Senate from 1875 to 1876. Additionally, he was an alderman and Mayor of Manitowoc. He was a Republican.
