= 27th Wisconsin Legislature =

Wisconsin legislative term for 1874

←	26th	28th	→
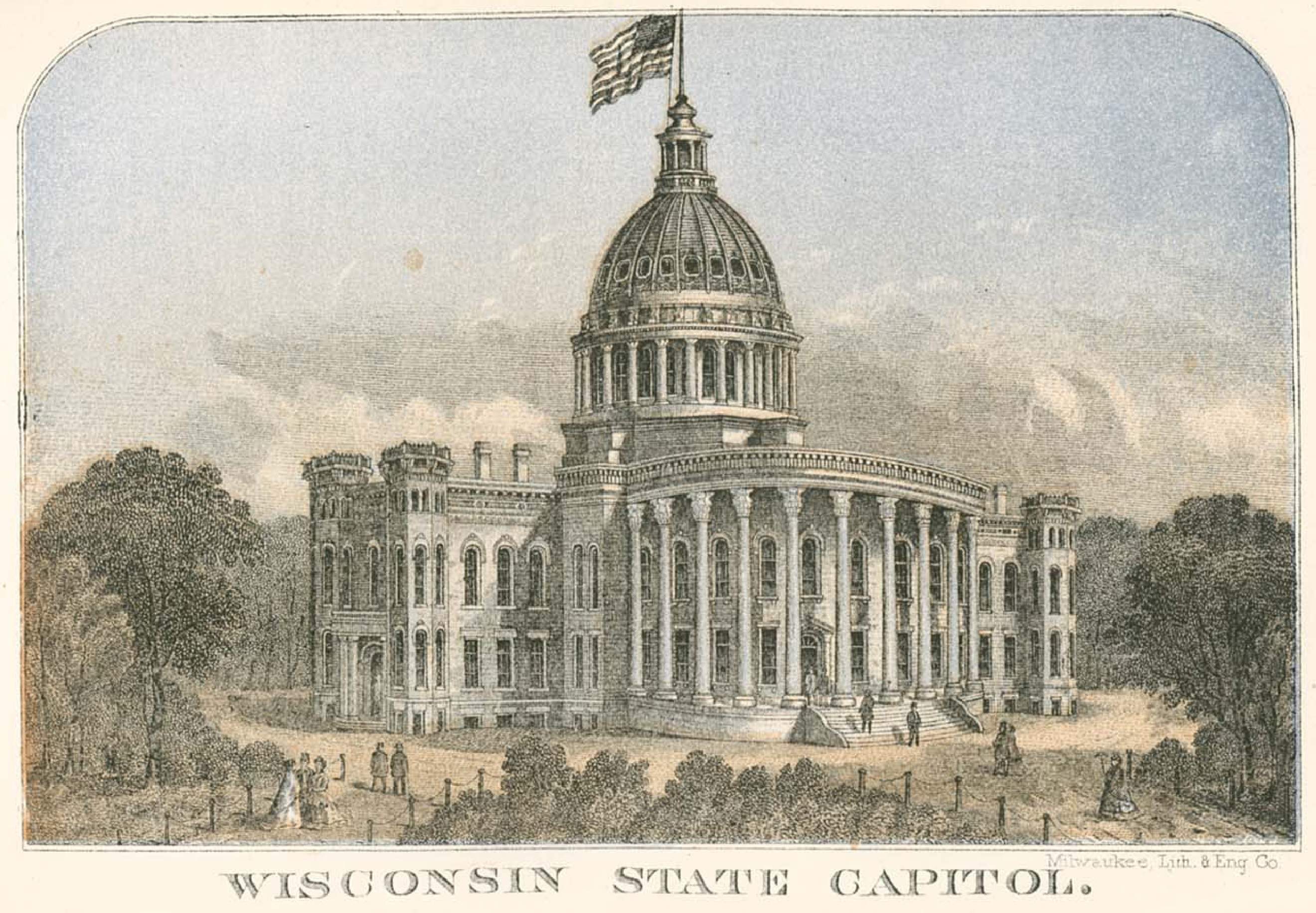
- Wisconsin State Capitol, 1863

Overview
- Legislative body: Wisconsin Legislature
- Meeting place: Wisconsin State Capitol
- Term: January 5, 1874 – January 4, 1875
- Election: November 4, 1873

Senate
- Members: 33
- Senate President: Charles D. Parker (D)
- President pro tempore: John C. Holloway (R)
- Party control: Republican

Assembly
- Members: 100
- Assembly Speaker: Gabriel Bouck (D)
- Party control: Democratic

Sessions
- 1st: January 14, 1874 – March 12, 1874

The Twenty-Seventh Wisconsin Legislature convened from January 14, 1874, to March 12, 1874, in regular session.

This was the first session since 1856 in which the Democratic Party held control of the Assembly.

Senators representing even-numbered districts were newly elected for this session and were serving the first year of a two-year term. Assembly members were elected to a one-year term. Assembly members and even-numbered senators were elected in the general election of November 4, 1873. Senators representing odd-numbered districts were serving the second year of their two-year term, having been elected in the general election held on November 5, 1872.

The governor of Wisconsin during this entire term was Democrat William Robert Taylor, of Dane County, serving the first year of a two-year term, having won election in the 1873 Wisconsin gubernatorial election.

== Major events ==
- January 5, 1874: Inauguration of William Robert Taylor as 12th governor of Wisconsin.
- June 16, 1874: Wisconsin Supreme Court chief justice Luther S. Dixon resigned from the court. Governor William Robert Taylor immediately appointed Milwaukee city attorney Edward George Ryan to become the 5th chief justice.
- July 1, 1874: The Sholes and Glidden typewriter was first marketed in the United States, it was principally designed by Wisconsin resident C. Latham Sholes.
- October 9, 1874: The Treaty of Bern was signed, establishing a General Postal Union for the coordination of international mail deliveries.
- November 25, 1874: The Greenback Party was established as a United States political party, composed mostly of farmers suffering the financial effects of the Panic of 1873.

== Major legislation ==
- February 26, 1874: An Act to prohibit certain provisions and conditions in contracts, 1874 Act 60. Outlawed contract terms which attempted to remove contract disputes from court jurisdiction.
- March 7, 1874: Joint Resolution providing for biennial sessions of the legislature and compensation of members, 1874 Joint Resolution 5. Proposed an amendment to the Constitution of Wisconsin to change Assembly terms from one year to two years. This version of the amendment would be defeated, but a later attempt at the same change would be approved in 1882.
- March 10, 1874: An Act to regulate railroads in certain respects, 1874 Act 227. Required that railroad lines passing through populated areas must make at least one stop in that area per day.
- March 11, 1874: An Act relating to railroads, express and telegraph companies, in the state of Wisconsin, 1874 Act 273. Implemented regulation of railroad freight and passenger rates, and established the Wisconsin Railroad Commission to enforce the new law. Referred to in historical documents and newspapers as the "Potter Law" for its chief sponsor Robert L. D. Potter.
- March 12, 1874: An Act in relation to railroads, 1874 Act 341. Declared that all railroad lines in the state would be common carriers, and carry each others passengers and cars without discrimination.

== Party summary ==
=== Senate summary ===
Senate partisan composition Democratic: 12 seats Reform: 2 seats Liberal Republican: 2 seats Republican: 17 seats

	Party (Shading indicates majority caucus)				Total	
	Dem.	Ref.	Lib.R.	Rep.	Total	Vacant
End of previous Legislature	10	0	2	21	33	0
1st Session	12	2	2	17	33	0
Final voting share	48.48%			51.52%		
Beginning of the next Legislature	9	5	2	17	33	0

=== Assembly summary ===
Assembly partisan composition Democratic: 29 seats Reform: 15 seats Independent: 3 seats Liberal Republican: 12 seats Republican: 41 seats

	Party (Shading indicates majority caucus)					Total	
	Dem.	Ref.	Ind.	Lib.R.	Rep.	Total	Vacant
End of previous Legislature	32	0	0	7	61	100	0
1st Session	29	15	3	12	41	100	0
Final voting share	59%				41%		
Beginning of the next Legislature	19	13	0	4	64	100	0

== Sessions ==
- 1st Regular session: January 14, 1874 – March 12, 1874

== Leaders ==
=== Senate leadership ===
- President of the Senate: Charles D. Parker (D)
- President pro tempore: John Chandler Holloway (R)

=== Assembly leadership ===
- Speaker of the Assembly: Gabriel Bouck (D)

== Members ==
=== Members of the Senate ===
Members of the Senate for the Twenty-Seventh Wisconsin Legislature:

Senate partisan representation Democratic: 12 seats Reform: 2 seats Lib. Rep.: 2 seats Republican: 17 seats

Dist.	Counties	Senator	Residence	Party
01	Sheboygan	Patrick H. O'Rourk	Lyndon	Dem.
02	Brown, Door, & Kewaunee	John M. Read	Kewaunee	Dem.
03	Milwaukee (Northern Part)	Frederick W. Cotzhausen	Milwaukee	Dem.
04	Monroe & Vernon	Adelbert Bleekman	Tomah	Rep.
05	Racine	Charles Herrick	Racine	Lib.R.
06	Milwaukee (Southern Half)	John Black	Milwaukee	Dem.
07	Dane (Eastern Part)	John A. Johnson	Madison	Rep.
08	Kenosha & Walworth	Thompson Weeks	Whitewater	Rep.
09	Iowa	Francis Little	Linden	Rep.
10	Waukesha	John A. Rice	Merton	Dem.
11	Lafayette	Francis Campbell	Gratiot	Rep.
12	Green	Harvey T. Moore	Brodhead	Ref.
13	Dodge	Samuel D. Burchard	Beaver Dam	Dem.
14	Sauk	John B. Quimby	Sauk City	Rep.
15	Manitowoc	Carl H. Schmidt	Manitowoc	Dem.
16	Grant	John C. Holloway	Lancaster	Rep.
17	Rock	Horatio N. Davis	Beloit	Rep.
18	Fond du Lac (Western Part)	William Hiner	Fond du Lac	Rep.
19	Winnebago	Robert McCurdy	Oshkosh	Rep.
20	Fond du Lac (Eastern Part)	Joseph Wagner	Marshfield	Dem.
21	Marathon, Oconto, Shawano, Waupaca, & Northern Outagamie	Myron H. McCord	Shawano	Rep.
22	Calumet & Southern Outagamie	Reinhard Schlichting	Chilton	Ref.
23	Jefferson	Walter S. Greene	Milford	Dem.
24	Ashland, Barron, Bayfield, Burnett, Douglas, Pierce, Polk, & St. Croix	Henry D. Barron	St. Croix Falls	Rep.
25	Green Lake, Marquette, & Waushara	Robert L. D. Potter	Wautoma	Rep.
26	Dane (Western Part)	Romanzo E. Davis	Middleton	Lib.R.
27	Columbia	Evan O. Jones	Courtland	Rep.
28	Crawford & Richland	George Krouskop	Richland Center	Dem.
29	Adams, Juneau, Portage, & Wood	Thomas B. Scott	Grand Rapids	Rep.
30	Chippewa, Dunn, Eau Claire, & Pepin	Hiram P. Graham	Eau Claire	Dem.
31	La Crosse	Gideon Hixon	La Crosse	Rep.
32	Buffalo, Clark, Jackson, & Trempealeau	Robert C. Field	Sumner	Rep.
33	Ozaukee & Washington	Adam Schantz	Addison	Dem.

=== Members of the Assembly ===
Members of the Assembly for the Twenty-Seventh Wisconsin Legislature:

Assembly partisan composition Democratic: 29 seats Reform: 15 seats Independent: 3 seats Liberal Republican: 12 seats Republican: 41 seats

Senate District	County	Dist.	Representative	Party	Residence
29	Adams & Wood		Charles A. Cady	Rep.	Dell Prairie
24	Ashland, Barron, Bayfield, Burnett, Douglas, Polk		Sam Fifield	Rep.	Ashland
02	Brown & Southern Kewaunee	1	Morgan L. Martin	Ref.	Green Bay
02	Brown & Southern Kewaunee	2	William H. Bartran	Rep.	Fort Howard
02	Brown & Southern Kewaunee	3	Patrick Hobbins	Dem.	Holland
32	Buffalo		Augustus F. Finkelnburg	Rep.	Fountain City
22	Calumet		Benjamin F. Carter	Dem.	Harrison
30	Chippewa		James M. Bingham	Rep.	Chippewa Falls
32	Clark & Jackson		Mark Douglas	Rep.	Melrose
27	Columbia	1	Jonathan Bowman	Rep.	Newport
27	Columbia	2	Samuel Hasey	Rep.	Hampden
27	Columbia	3	Hiram W. Roblier	Rep.	Wyocena
28	Crawford		William H. Evans	Ref.	Clayton
07	Dane	1	John Johnson	Ind.	York
07	Dane	2	Philo Dunning	Ref.	Madison
26	Dane	3	John Kehl	Con.D.	Vermont
26	Dane	4	Michael Johnson	Dem.	Springdale
13	Dodge	1	Edward J. Boomer	Rep.	Trenton
13	Dodge	2	David C. Gowdey	Dem.	Beaver Dam
13	Dodge	3	Darius L. Bancroft	Rep.	Chester
13	Dodge	4	Jacob Bodden	Dem.	Theresa
13	Dodge	5	August H. Lehmann	Ref.	Hustisford
13	Dodge	6	John Dunn Jr.	Dem.	Ashippun
02	Door & Northern Kewaunee		Dennis A. Reed	Ind.	Sturgeon Bay
30	Dunn & Pepin		Samuel L. Plummer	Rep.	Waterville
30	Eau Claire		Thomas Carmichael	Ref.	Eau Claire
18	Fond du Lac	1	David Whitton	Ref.	Brandon
18	Fond du Lac	2	Thomas S. Weeks	Dem.	Fond du Lac
20	Fond du Lac	3	James Lafferty	Dem.	Empire
16	Grant	1	Thomas Jenkins	Dem.	Platteville
16	Grant	2	John B. Callis	Lib.R.	Lancaster
16	Grant	3	Gottlieb Wehrle	Lib.R.	Fennimore
16	Grant	4	Robert Glenn	Rep.	Wyalusing
12	Green		Charles R. Deniston	Rep.	Cadiz
25	Green Lake		Seymour M. Knox	Rep.	Green Lake
09	Iowa	1	William E. Rowe	Lib.R.	Arena
09	Iowa	2	William Robinson	Rep.	Moscow
23	Jefferson	1	Charles Beckman	Ref.	Watertown
23	Jefferson	2	Austin Kellogg	Dem.	Concord
23	Jefferson	3	Lucien B. Caswell	Rep.	Fort Atkinson
29	Juneau		John T. Kingston	Rep.	Necedah
08	Kenosha		Robert S. Houston	Ref.	Pleasant Prairie
31	La Crosse		Donald A. McDonald	Lib.R.	La Crosse
11	Lafayette		John F. Beard	Ref.	Gratiot
15	Manitowoc	1	Charles R. Zorn	Dem.	Schleswig
15	Manitowoc	2	Bryan S. Lorigan	Dem.	Maple Grove
15	Manitowoc	3	Joseph Rankin	Dem.	Manitowoc
21	Marathon		Willis C. Silverthorn	Lib.D.	Wausau
25	Marquette		William Murphy	Dem.	Douglas
03	Milwaukee	1	Alfred L. Cary	Dem.	Milwaukee
03	Milwaukee	2	Joseph Hamilton	Ref.	Milwaukee
06	Milwaukee	3	James McGrath	Dem.	Milwaukee
06	Milwaukee	4	A. Warren Phelps	Lib.R.	Milwaukee
06	Milwaukee	5	Charles H. Larkin	Dem.	Milwaukee
03	Milwaukee	6	Daniel H. Richards	Dem.	Milwaukee
06	Milwaukee	7	Francis H. West	Lib.R.	Milwaukee
06	Milwaukee	8	Frederick Vogel	Lib.R.	Milwaukee
03	Milwaukee	9	John L. Semmann	Dem.	Milwaukee
03	Milwaukee	10	Peter Porth	Dem.	Granville
06	Milwaukee	11	James McIver	Ind.	Lake
04	Monroe	1	Eli Waste	Rep.	Sparta
04	Monroe	2	Thomas McCaul	Lib.R.	Tomah
21	Oconto		Henry M. Royce	Rep.	Oconto
22	Outagamie, Shawano, & Waupaca	1	George N. Richmond	Lib.D.	Appleton
21	Outagamie, Shawano, & Waupaca	2	Lorenzo E. Darling	Rep.	Ellington
21	Outagamie, Shawano, & Waupaca	3	Columbus Caldwell	Rep.	Lind
33	Ozaukee	1	Edward R. Blake	Dem.	Ozaukee
33	Ozaukee	2	Adolphus Zimmermann	Dem.	Mequon
24	Pierce		James H. Persons	Rep.	Union
29	Portage		David R. Clements	Rep.	Stevens Point
05	Racine	1	Charles F. Bliss	Dem.	Racine
05	Racine	2	Elias White	Ref.	Burlington
28	Richland	1	Joseph McGrew	Rep.	Richland Center
28	Richland	2	Philip M. Smith	Rep.	Marshall
17	Rock	1	Marvin Osborne	Rep.	Magnolia
17	Rock	2	Solomon C. Carr	Rep.	Milton
17	Rock	3	Andrew Barlass	Rep.	Harmony
17	Rock	4	Asahel Henderson	Rep.	Beloit
17	Rock	5	John Winans	Ref.	Janesville
14	Sauk	1	Carl C. Kuntz	Lib.R.	Honey Creek
14	Sauk	2	David E. Welch	Rep.	Delton
01	Sheboygan	1	Julius Bodenstab	Lib.R.	Howard's Grove
01	Sheboygan	2	Samuel D. Hubbard	Lib.R.	Lyndon
01	Sheboygan	3	Louis Wolf	Dem.	Sheboygan Falls
24	St. Croix		Harvey Clapp	Rep.	New Richmond
32	Trempealeau		Noah D. Comstock	Rep.	Arcadia
04	Vernon	1	William Frazier	Rep.	Sterling
04	Vernon	2	Edgar Eno	Rep.	Forest
08	Walworth	1	Wilson R. Herron	Rep.	Sharon
08	Walworth	2	Francis A. Buckbee	Rep.	Spring Prairie
08	Walworth	3	William Burgit	Rep.	East Troy
33	Washington	1	Hiram W. Sawyer	Dem.	Hartford
33	Washington	2	Jeremiah Riordan	Dem.	Trenton
10	Waukesha	1	William H. Hardy	Dem.	Genesee
10	Waukesha	2	Henry J. Clasen	Dem.	Brookfield
25	Waushara		Charles H. Stowers	Rep.	Bloomfield
19	Winnebago	1	Gabriel Bouck	Dem.	Oshkosh
19	Winnebago	2	William P. Peckham	Lib.R.	Neenah
19	Winnebago	3	Carlton Foster	Rep.	Oshkosh
19	Winnebago	4	Frank A. Leach	Rep.	Utica

== Employees ==
=== Senate employees ===
- Chief Clerk: J. H. Waggoner
  - Assistant Clerk: Robert A. Gillett
    - Bookkeeper: T. S. Ansley
  - Engrossing Clerk: Mrs. Fannie Vilas
  - Enrolling Clerk: W. L. Abbott
  - Transcribing Clerk: John W. Brackett
  - Clerk for the Committee on Engrossed Bills: E. S. Knight
  - Clerk for the Committee on Enrolled Bills: Will Bates
- Sergeant-at-Arms: O. U. Akin
  - Assistant Sergeant-at-Arms: E. J. Cole
- Postmaster: A. J. White
  - Assistant Postmaster: Nils Michelet
- Doorkeeper: W. H. Bell
  - Assistant Doorkeeper: M. Lynch
  - Assistant Doorkeeper: M. H. Cram
  - Gallery Doorkeeper: J. A. Newman
  - Gallery Doorkeeper: J. K. Dunn
  - Committee Room Attendant: J. Williams
  - Night Watch: Fred Bright
- Lt. Governors Messenger: Wendell Paine
- Clerk's Messenger: Eddie McCurdy
- Messengers:
  - Fred Richards
  - Daniel Fitzpatrick
  - Charlie Colvin
  - Richard Murphy
  - Marcus Moody

=== Assembly employees ===
- Chief Clerk: George Wilbur Peck
  - Assistant Clerk: Frank Hatch
    - Bookkeeper: J. W. Ryckman
  - Engrossing Clerk: J. C. Eggers
  - Enrolling Clerk: E. C. Enos
  - Transcribing Clerk: G. J. Patton
- Sergeant-at-Arms: Joseph Deuster
  - Assistant Sergeant-at-Arms: Columbus Germain
- Postmaster: Agesilaus Wilson
  - Assistant Postmaster: A. S. Weil
- Doorkeepers:
  - B. S. Rollin
  - Michael Kelly
  - W. Hyde
- Night Watch: Bernard C. Wolter
- Fireman: Felix McLindon
- Committee Room Attendants:
  - D. S. Harkness
  - W. Hughes
  - Richard Donovan
  - Edward Flaherty
- Porter: David Goodell
- Speaker's Messenger: Clinton Snow
- Chief Clerk's Messenger: Winnie Hassell
- Sergeant-at-Arms' Messenger: Helson Bronnell
- Messengers:
  - Charles Johnson
  - Charles Murphy
  - James Foran
  - Frank Dunn
  - Willie Pitman
  - Charlie Whitton
  - Theodore Cooper
  - Walter Reyson
