= 28th Wisconsin Legislature =

Wisconsin legislative term for 1875

←	27th	29th	→
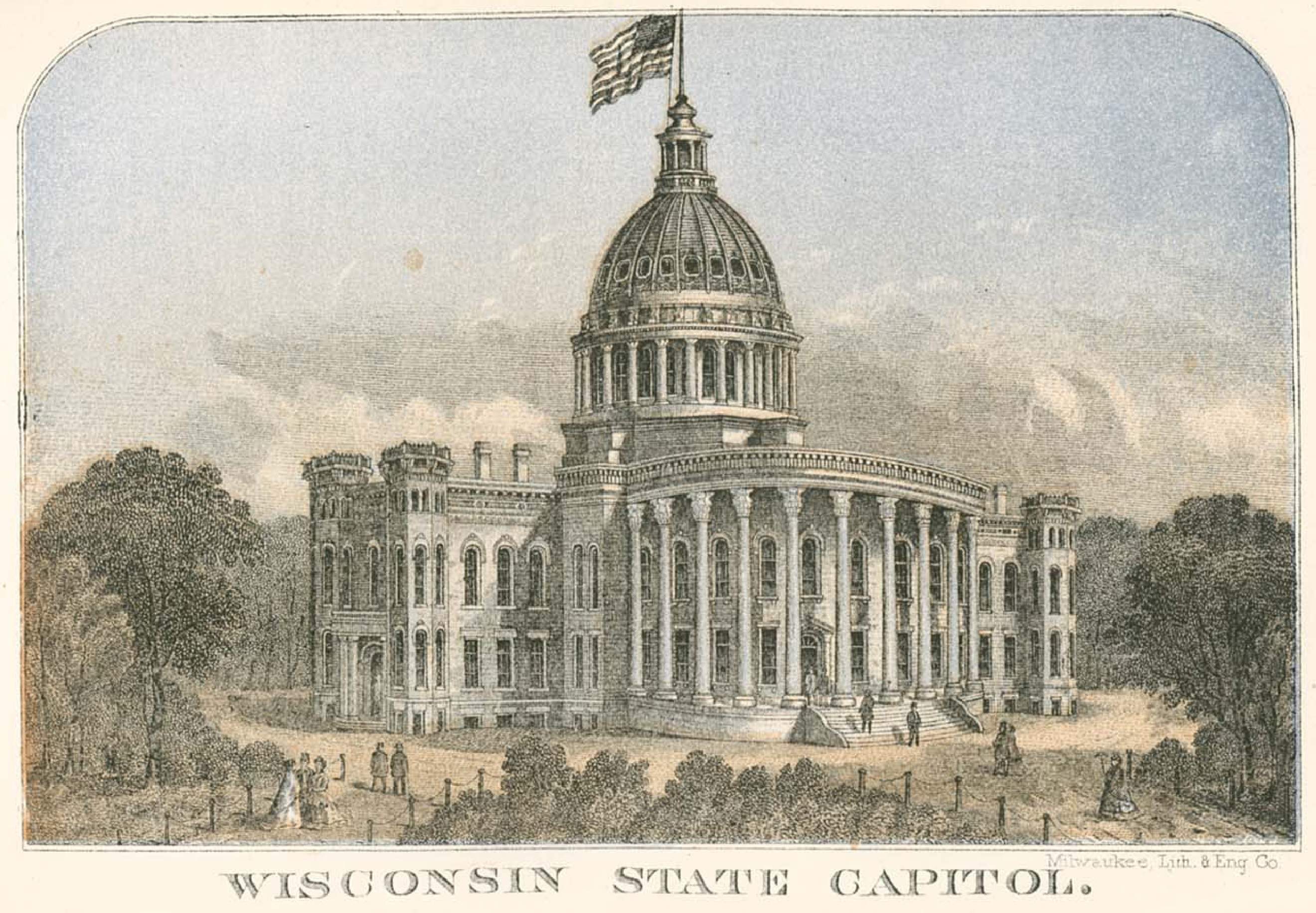
- Wisconsin State Capitol, 1863

Overview
- Legislative body: Wisconsin Legislature
- Meeting place: Wisconsin State Capitol
- Term: January 4, 1875 – January 3, 1876
- Election: November 3, 1874

Senate
- Members: 33
- Senate President: Charles D. Parker (D)
- President pro tempore: Henry D. Barron (R)
- Party control: Republican

Assembly
- Members: 100
- Assembly Speaker: Frederick W. Horn (IR)
- Party control: Republican

Sessions
- 1st: January 13, 1875 – March 6, 1875

The Twenty-Eighth Wisconsin Legislature convened from January 13, 1875, to March 6, 1875, in regular session.

Senators representing odd-numbered districts were newly elected for this session and were serving the first year of a two-year term. Assembly members were elected to a one-year term. Assembly members and odd-numbered senators were elected in the general election of November 3, 1874. Senators representing even-numbered districts were serving the second year of their two-year term, having been elected in the general election held on November 4, 1873.

The governor of Wisconsin during this entire term was Democrat William Robert Taylor, of Dane County, serving the second year of a two-year term, having won election in the 1873 Wisconsin gubernatorial election.

== Major events ==
- February 8, 1875: Angus Cameron was elected United States Senator by the Wisconsin Legislature in joint session.
- March 1, 1875: President Ulysses S. Grant signed the Civil Rights Act of 1875 into law.
- May 20, 1875: The Metre Convention was signed in Paris, establishing the International Bureau of Weights and Measures.
- November 2, 1875: Harrison Ludington elected Governor of Wisconsin.

== Major legislation ==
- February 17, 1875: An Act to require the several railroad companies in this state to provide for the safety of passengers, 1875 Act 24.
- February 20, 1875: An Act to amend chapter 273, of the laws of 1874, entitled "An act relating to railroad, express and telegraph companies in the state of Wisconsin," 1875 Act 39. Replaced the three-person railroad commission with a single railroad commissioner.
- February 24, 1875: An Act to more fully define and punish the crime of bribery, committed at or before elections, 1875 Act 56. Criminalized the buying or selling of votes.
- February 27, 1875: An Act to prevent the ensnaring or trapping of deer, 1875 Act 85.
- March 2, 1875: An Act to render women eligible to local school offices, 1875 Act 120.
- March 2, 1875: An Act to encourage the invention and successful use of steam or other mechanical agents on highways, 1875 Act 134. Created a $10,000 bounty for invention of a steam-powered substitute for horses for transportation or farm labor.
- March 3, 1875: An Act to prevent and punish cruelty to animals, 1875 Act 150.

== Party summary ==
=== Senate summary ===
Senate partisan composition Democratic: 9 seats Reform: 5 seats Liberal Republican: 2 seats Republican: 17 seats

	Party (Shading indicates majority caucus)				Total	
	Dem.	Ref.	Lib.R.	Rep.	Total	Vacant
End of previous Legislature	12	2	2	17	33	0
1st Session	9	5	2	17	33	0
Final voting share	48.48%			51.52%		
Beginning of the next Legislature	6	4	2	21	33	0

=== Assembly summary ===
Assembly partisan composition Democratic: 19 seats Reform: 13 seats Liberal Republican: 4 seats Republican: 64 seats

	Party (Shading indicates majority caucus)					Total	
	Dem.	Ref.	Ind.	Lib.R.	Rep.	Total	Vacant
End of previous Legislature	29	15	3	12	41	100	0
1st Session	19	13	0	4	64	100	0
Final voting share	36%				64%		
Beginning of the next Legislature	35	12	1	1	51	100	0

== Sessions ==
- 1st Regular session: January 13, 1875 – March 6, 1875

== Leaders ==
=== Senate leadership ===
- President of the Senate: Charles D. Parker (D)
- President pro tempore: Henry D. Barron (R)

=== Assembly leadership ===
- Speaker of the Assembly: Frederick W. Horn (IR)

== Members ==
=== Members of the Senate ===
Members of the Senate for the Twenty-Eighth Wisconsin Legislature:

Senate partisan representation Democratic: 9 seats Reform: 5 seats Liberal Republican: 2 seats Republican: 17 seats

Dist.	Counties	Senator	Residence	Party
01	Sheboygan	Enos Eastman	Plymouth	Dem.
02	Brown, Door, & Kewaunee	John M. Read	Kewaunee	Dem.
03	Milwaukee (Northern Part)	William H. Jacobs	Milwaukee	Ref.
04	Monroe & Vernon	Adelbert Bleekman	Tomah	Rep.
05	Racine	Robert Hall Baker	Racine	Rep.
06	Milwaukee (Southern Half)	John Black	Milwaukee	Dem.
07	Dane (Eastern Part)	George E. Bryant	Madison	Rep.
08	Kenosha & Walworth	Thompson Weeks	Whitewater	Rep.
09	Iowa	David McFarland	Highland	Ref.
10	Waukesha	John A. Rice	Merton	Dem.
11	Lafayette	Francis Campbell	Gratiot	Rep.
12	Green	Harvey T. Moore	Brodhead	Ref.
13	Dodge	John A. Barney	Mayville	Dem.
14	Sauk	John B. Quimby	Sauk City	Rep.
15	Manitowoc	John Schuette	Manitowoc	Rep.
16	Grant	John C. Holloway	Lancaster	Rep.
17	Rock	Horatio N. Davis	Beloit	Rep.
18	Fond du Lac (Western Part)	William Hiner	Fond du Lac	Rep.
19	Winnebago	William P. Rounds	Menasha	Rep.
20	Fond du Lac (Eastern Part)	Joseph Wagner	Marshfield	Dem.
21	Marathon, Oconto, Shawano, Waupaca, & Northern Outagamie	Willis C. Silverthorn	Wausau	Lib.D.
22	Calumet & Southern Outagamie	Reinhard Schlichting	Chilton	Ref.
23	Jefferson	William W. Reed	Jefferson	Lib.R.
24	Ashland, Barron, Bayfield, Burnett, Douglas, Pierce, Polk, & St. Croix	Henry D. Barron	St. Croix Falls	Rep.
25	Green Lake, Marquette, & Waushara	Robert L. D. Potter	Wautoma	Rep.
26	Dane (Western Part)	Romanzo E. Davis	Middleton	Lib.R.
27	Columbia	Levi W. Barden	Portage	Rep.
28	Crawford & Richland	George Krouskop	Richland Center	Dem.
29	Adams, Juneau, Portage, & Wood	Thomas B. Scott	Grand Rapids	Rep.
30	Chippewa, Dunn, Eau Claire, & Pepin	Hiram P. Graham	Eau Claire	Dem.
31	La Crosse	Sylvester Nevins	La Crosse	Rep.
32	Buffalo, Clark, Jackson, & Trempealeau	Robert C. Field	Sumner	Rep.
33	Ozaukee & Washington	Gilead J. Wilmot	West Bend	Dem.

=== Members of the Assembly ===
Members of the Assembly for the Twenty-Eighth Wisconsin Legislature:

Assembly partisan representation Democratic: 19 seats Reform: 13 seats Liberal Republican: 4 seats Republican: 64 seats

Senate District	County	Dist.	Representative	Party	Residence
29	Adams & Wood		G. M. Marshall	Rep.	Big Spring
24	Ashland, Barron, Bayfield, Burnett, Douglas, Polk		Sam Fifield	Rep.	Ashland
02	Brown & Southern Kewaunee	1	Thomas R. Hudd	Ref.	Green Bay
02	Brown & Southern Kewaunee	2	William J. Fisk	Rep.	Fort Howard
02	Brown & Southern Kewaunee	3	Patrick Hobbins	Dem.	Morrison
32	Buffalo		Edward Lees	Dem.	Fountain City
22	Calumet		John Harsh	Rep.	Stockbridge
30	Chippewa		Thomas L. Halbert	Rep.	Chippewa Falls
32	Clark & Jackson		Richard Dewhurst	Ref.	Neillsville
27	Columbia	1	Marcus Barden	Rep.	Pardeeville
27	Columbia	2	John R. Rowlands	Rep.	Cambria
27	Columbia	3	John B. Dwinnell	Rep.	Lodi
28	Crawford		Zenas Beach	Rep.	Eastman
07	Dane	1	Isaac Adams	Rep.	Door Creek
07	Dane	2	Silas U. Pinney	Dem.	Madison
26	Dane	3	David Ford	Dem.	Waunakee
26	Dane	4	Michael Johnson	Ref.	Springdale
13	Dodge	1	Owen R. Jones	Rep.	Beaver Dam
13	Dodge	2	David M. Coleman	Rep.	Lowell
13	Dodge	3	John Lloyd	Rep.	Clyman
13	Dodge	4	Max Bachhuber	Ref.	Farmersville
13	Dodge	5	William M. Morse	Dem.	Rubicon
13	Dodge	6	Harman Grube	Ref.	Watertown
02	Door & Northern Kewaunee		Charles Scofield	Rep.	Red River
30	Dunn & Pepin		Rockwell J. Flint	Rep.	Menomonie
30	Eau Claire		Jonathan G. Callahan	Rep.	Eau Claire
18	Fond du Lac	1	William Plocker	Rep.	Fairwater
18	Fond du Lac	2	George Hunter	Rep.	Fond du Lac
20	Fond du Lac	3	Michael Serwe	Dem.	Ashford
16	Grant	1	James Jeffery	Rep.	Georgetown
16	Grant	2	Lafayette Caskey	Rep.	Potosi
16	Grant	3	Benjamin M. Coates	Rep.	Boscobel
16	Grant	4	Delos Abrams	Rep.	Bloomington
12	Green		Charles R. Deniston	Rep.	Cadiz
25	Green Lake		William H. Dakin	Rep.	Dartford
09	Iowa	1	Owen King	Ref.	Helena
09	Iowa	2	Kearton Coates	Rep.	Linden
23	Jefferson	1	Christian Mayer	Ref.	Watertown
23	Jefferson	2	Austin Kellogg	Dem.	Concord
23	Jefferson	3	James W. Ostrander	Rep.	Jefferson
29	Juneau		Job Grant	Lib.R.	Union Center
08	Kenosha		Rouse Simmons	Rep.	Kenosha
31	La Crosse		John Bradley	Rep.	Bangor
11	Lafayette		John Anderson	Dem.	Monticello
15	Manitowoc	1	Fred Schmitz	Ref.	Northeim
15	Manitowoc	2	Bryan S. Lorigan	Dem.	Maple Grove
15	Manitowoc	3	Reuben D. Smart	Rep.	Manitowoc
21	Marathon		Bartholomew Ringle	Dem.	Wausau
25	Marquette		Robert Mitchell	Rep.	Douglas
03	Milwaukee	1	Isaac W. Van Schaick	Rep.	Milwaukee
03	Milwaukee	2	Peter Fagg	Ref.	Milwaukee
06	Milwaukee	3	William J. Kershaw	Ind.R.	Milwaukee
06	Milwaukee	4	Stephen A. Harrison	Rep.	Milwaukee
06	Milwaukee	5	Charles H. Larkin	Dem.	Milwaukee
03	Milwaukee	6	Daniel H. Richards	Dem.	Milwaukee
06	Milwaukee	7	Lemuel Ellsworth	Rep.	Milwaukee
06	Milwaukee	8	Bernard Schlichting	Rep.	Milwaukee
03	Milwaukee	9	Frederick Zetteler	Dem.	Milwaukee
03	Milwaukee	10	Frederick Moskowitt	Lib.R.	Milwaukee
06	Milwaukee	11	Thomas O'Neill	Rep.	Greenfield
04	Monroe	1	Eli Waste	Rep.	Sparta
04	Monroe	2	William W. Jackson	Rep.	Tomah
21	Oconto		John Leigh	Rep.	Oconto
22	Outagamie, Shawano, & Waupaca	1	George N. Richmond	Lib.D.	Appleton
21	Outagamie, Shawano, & Waupaca	2	Herman Naber	Ref.	Shawano
21	Outagamie, Shawano, & Waupaca	3	George H. Calkins	Rep.	Waupaca
33	Ozaukee	1	Gustav Gotze	Lib.R.	Ozaukee
33	Ozaukee	2	Frederick W. Horn	Ind.R.	Cedarburg
24	Pierce		Thomas L. Nelson	Rep.	Prescott
29	Portage		George H. Guernsey	Rep.	Almond
05	Racine	1	Charles F. Bliss	Dem.	Racine
05	Racine	2	Elias White	Ref.	Burlington
28	Richland	1	Norman L. James	Rep.	Richland Center
28	Richland	2	Benjamin F. Washburn	Rep.	Excelsior
17	Rock	1	Marvin Osborne	Rep.	Magnolia
17	Rock	2	Zebulon P. Burdick	Rep.	Janesville
17	Rock	3	Andrew Barlass	Rep.	Harmony
17	Rock	4	George H. Crosby	Rep.	Beloit
17	Rock	5	Hiram Merrill	Rep.	Janesville
14	Sauk	1	Thomas Baker	Rep.	Prairie du Sac
14	Sauk	2	David E. Welch	Rep.	Baraboo
01	Sheboygan	1	Joseph Wedig	Ref.	Howard's Grove
01	Sheboygan	2	Patrick Geraghty	Ref.	Elkhart Lake
01	Sheboygan	3	Nathaniel Farnsworth	Rep.	Sheboygan Falls
24	St. Croix		Philo Boyden	Lib.	Hudson
32	Trempealeau		Noah D. Comstock	Rep.	Arcadia
04	Vernon	1	Ole Anderson	Rep.	Esofea
04	Vernon	2	James E. Newell	Rep.	Viroqua
08	Walworth	1	Elijah M. Sharp	Rep.	Delavan
08	Walworth	2	Charles Dunlap	Rep.	Elkhorn
08	Walworth	3	Nathaniel M. Bunker	Rep.	Troy Center
33	Washington	1	Andrew Martin	Dem.	Reisville
33	Washington	2	Philip Schneider	Dem.	Barton
10	Waukesha	1	Silas Barber	Dem.	Waukesha
10	Waukesha	2	Manville S. Hodgson	Rep.	Waukesha
25	Waushara		John H. Thomas	Rep.	Berlin
19	Winnebago	1	Asa Rogers	Dem.	Oshkosh
19	Winnebago	2	Nathaniel S. Robinson	Rep.	Neenah
19	Winnebago	3	Leroy S. Chase	Rep.	Omro
19	Winnebago	4	Frank A. Leach	Rep.	Utica

== Employees ==
=== Senate employees ===
- Chief Clerk: Fred A. Dennett
  - Assistant Clerk: Thomas B. Reid
    - Bookkeeper: Thomas St. George
  - Engrossing Clerk: Wilbur Dodge
  - Enrolling Clerk: James F. Spencer
  - Transcribing Clerk: Fred Heineman
  - Clerk for the Committee on Engrossed Bills: T. K. Dunn
  - Clerk for the Committee on Enrolled Bills: E. J. Cole
  - Clerk for the Committee on Claims: Thomas A. Dyson
  - Clerk for the Committee on Railroads: J. F. Johnston
  - Clerk for the Committee on Judiciary: A. P. Carman
- Sergeant-at-Arms: O. U. Akin
  - Assistant Sergeant-at-Arms: Charles G. Fay
- Postmaster: Amaziah Strang
  - Assistant Postmaster: John L. Quimby
- Doorkeeper: William R. Kent
  - Assistant Doorkeeper: William F. Bingman
  - Assistant Doorkeeper: H. H. Field
  - Gallery Doorkeeper: Charles Early
  - Gallery Doorkeeper: T. H. Hansen
  - Committee Room Attendant: Charles Scott
  - Night Watch: H. H. Grace
  - Porter: Michael Lynch
- Messengers:
  - Glennie C. Richarson
  - Waldo B. Stone
  - W. W. Paine
  - Harry R. Clise
  - Harry Cuttler
  - Arthur A. Hills
  - G. Herbert Campbell
  - William Kleinpell
  - Nelson C. Brownell

=== Assembly employees ===
- Chief Clerk: Rollin M. Strong
  - Assistant Clerk: C. D. Long
    - Bookkeeper: R. A. Gillett
  - Engrossing Clerk: Mrs. Fannie Vilas
  - Enrolling Clerk: Julius Lasche
  - Transcribing Clerk: W. M. Fogo
  - Clerk for the Committee on Engrossed Bills: C. H. Boynton
  - Clerk for the Committee on Enrolled Bills: Jonathan C. Sherwin Jr.
  - Clerk for the Committee on Judiciary: J. B. Stocking
- Sergeant-at-Arms: John W. Brackett
  - Assistant Sergeant-at-Arms: Miles Burnham
- Postmaster: P. J. Clawson
  - Assistant Postmaster: George H. Osgood
- Doorkeepers:
  - J. F. Tinker
  - N. F. Pierce
  - C. A. Sellers
  - Joseph Goss
- Night Watch: A. L. Lund
- Fireman: J. A. Nevill
- Committee Room Attendants:
  - W. H. Bell
  - J. W. Grange
  - L. Woodward
- Gallery Attendants:
  - W. L. Morrison
  - George L. Cain
- Porter: F. O. Byrne
- Speaker's Messenger: L. E. Knox
- Chief Clerk's Messenger: Rufus Jenkins
- Sergeant-at-Arms' Messenger: W. Kanouse
- Messengers:
  - Willie Horn
  - Ben C. Baker
  - Charles Keogh
  - Willie Devine
  - Willie Storm
  - Charles Rothe
  - Lucius Cannon
  - John Bruce
  - William Gallagher
  - Joseph Parrish
  - Theodore Kupper
  - Marcus Moody
