= 1875 United States Senate election in Wisconsin =

- January 27, 1875 – February 3, 1875
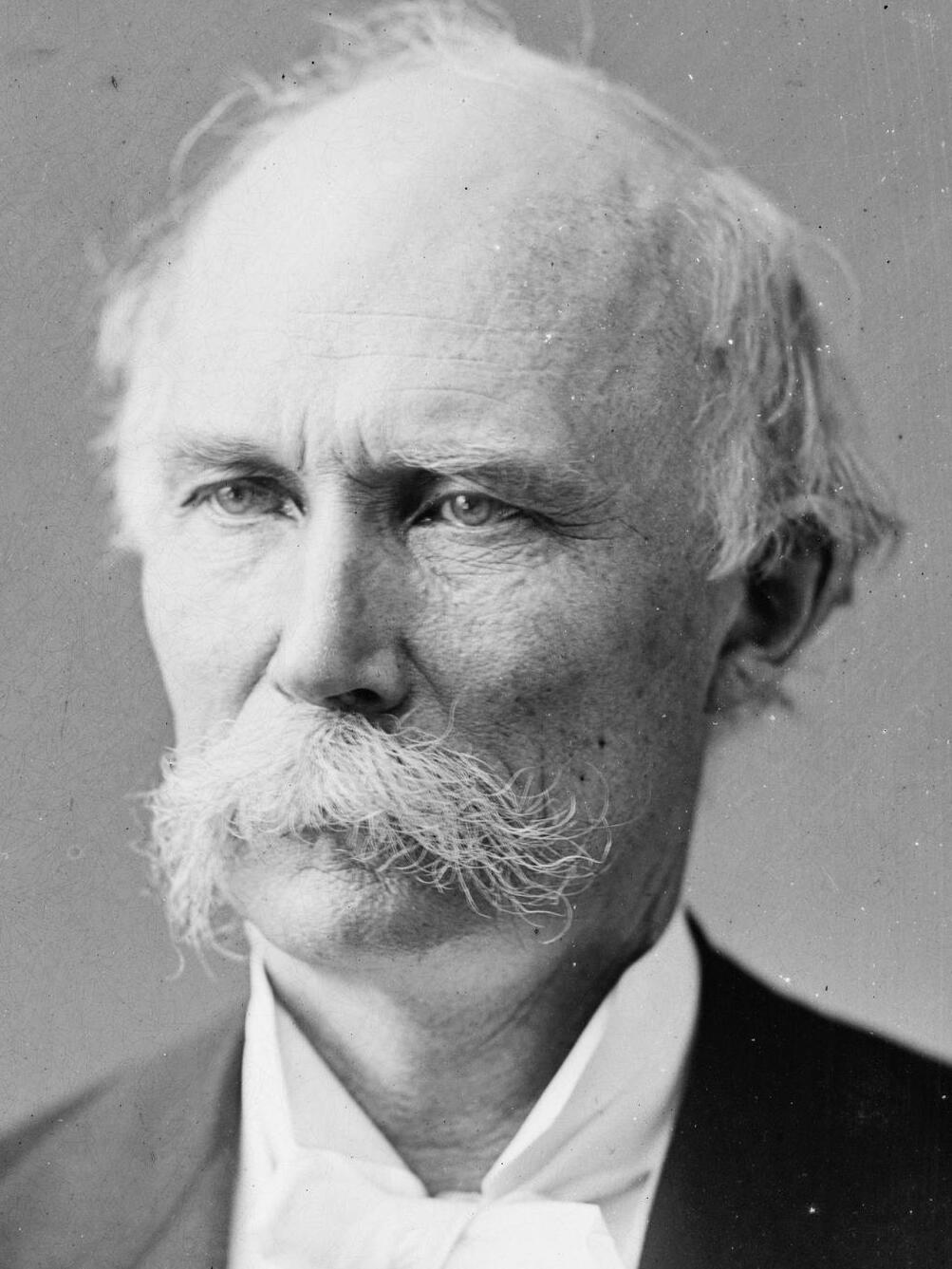

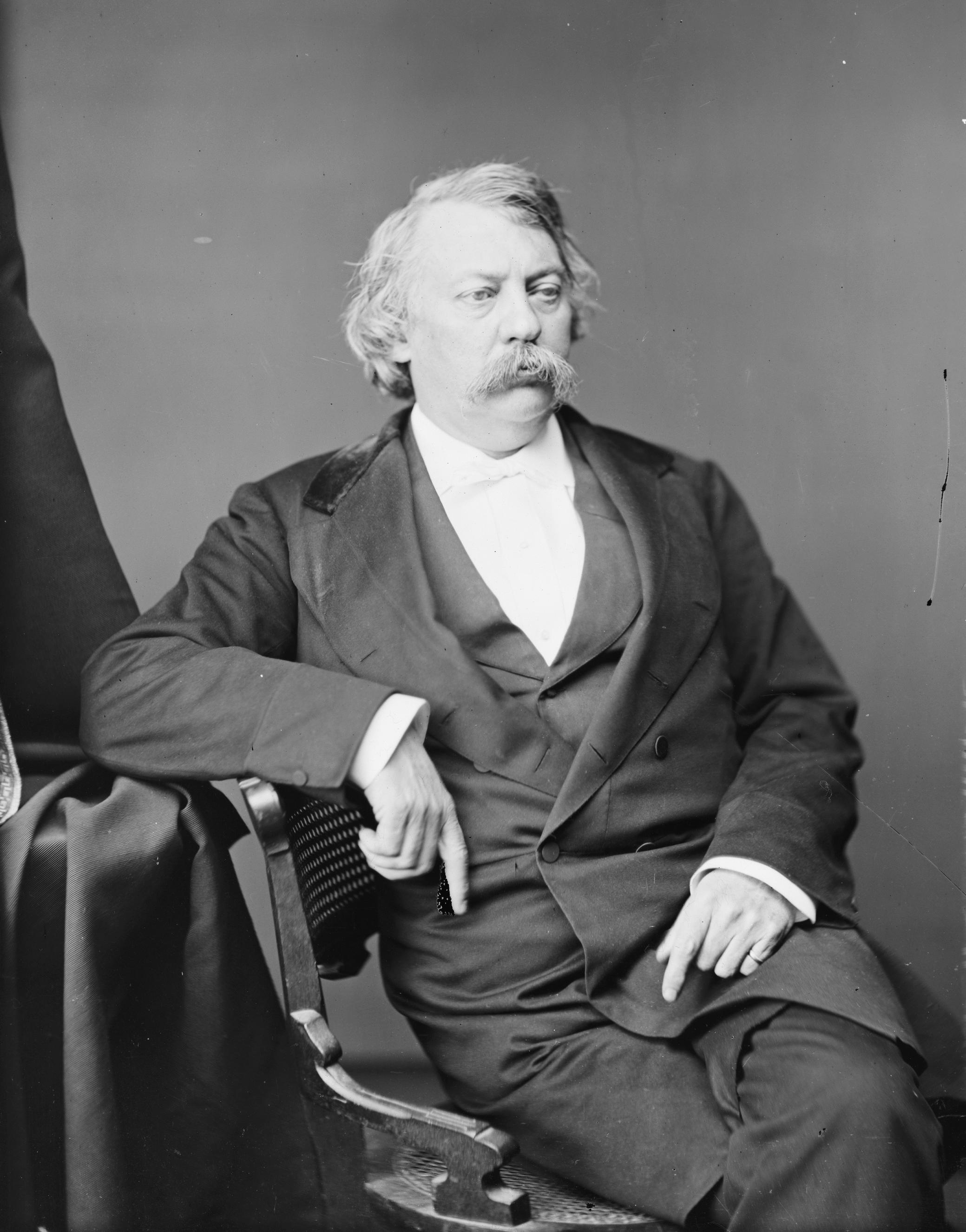
Nominee	Angus Cameron	Matthew H. Carpenter	others
Party	Republican	Republican
Legislative vote	68	59	5
Percentage	52.52%	44.70%	3.79%
U.S. senator before election
Matthew H. Carpenter
Republican
Elected U.S. Senator
Angus Cameron
Republican

The 1875 United States Senate election in Wisconsin was held in the 28th Wisconsin Legislature between January 27, 1875, and February 3, 1875. Incumbent Republican U.S. senator Matthew H. Carpenter ran for a second six-year term, but was defeated by a determined rebellion from within his own party. Former state legislator, Republican Angus Cameron, was elected United States senator on the 11th ballot. This was the first time that one of Wisconsin's U.S. senators had been defeated seeking re-election.

At the start of the 1875 term, Republicans held majorities in both chambers of the Wisconsin Legislature with 14 votes to spare, so should have been able to quickly elect a Republican United States senator. But accusations of corruption against the incumbent, Matt Carpenter, had caused a significant number of Republican legislators to pledge to voters that they would not support Carpenter's re-election to the U.S. Senate. Despite Carpenter winning enough support in the Republican caucus to obtain renomination, the holdouts refused to fall in line with the party and denied his re-election. Ultimately, Cameron was selected as a consensus choice merging the support of the 19 holdout Republicans with 49 of the 52 Democratic, Liberal Republican, or Reformer legislators.

== Major candidates ==
=== Democratic ===
- Edward S. Bragg, former state senator and former Union Army general from Fond du Lac.

=== Republican ===
- Angus Cameron, former speaker of the Wisconsin State Assembly, former state senator from La Crosse.
- Matthew H. Carpenter, incumbent U.S. senator.
- Orsamus Cole, incumbent justice of the Wisconsin Supreme Court.
- George Cochrane Hazelton, former state senator from Boscobel.
- Cadwallader C. Washburn, former governor of Wisconsin, former U.S. representative, former Union Army general.

== Results ==
=== Republican nomination ===
Prior to the caucus, Carpenter faced opposition in the caucus, but was still widely expected to win re-election in Wisconsin newspapers. During the two months between the legislative elections and the start of the legislative session, Carpenter was consumed with activity in Washington, D.C., where he was serving as presiding officer of the Senate due to the absence of Vice President Henry Wilson. At the time, Carpenter's leading opponent for the nomination was former Wisconsin governor Cadwallader C. Washburn, who had been a candidate for U.S. senate in each of the last four opportunities. The Wisconsin press concluded that one of the two would certainly be the next senator.

The Republican caucus met on the evening of January 21. On the first ballot, Carpenter secured the nomination with 54 of 81 votes. Republican newspapers urged legislators to fall in line and support the nominee, as rumors began to emerge of a planned revolt.

=== Votes on January 27, 1875 ===
The legislature met in joint session on January 27 with only one member absent. They took two votes in succession to try to pick a U.S. senator. The results were identical, no candidate reached a majority.

1st & 2nd Votes of the 28th Wisconsin Legislature, January 27, 1875
Party	Candidate	Ballots	
Party	Candidate	1st	2nd
Republican	Matthew H. Carpenter	59	59
Democratic	Edward S. Bragg	52	52
Republican	Orsamus Cole	13	13
Republican	George W. Allen	2	2
Republican	Romanzo Bunn	2	2
Republican	Horace Rublee	2	2
Republican	Luther S. Dixon	1 (Note: Republican senator John Schuette was the lone vote for Luther S. Dixon on the 1st, 2nd, 3rd, 4th, and 5th ballots.)	1
Republican	Lucius Fairchild	1 (Note: Republican representative Leroy S. Chase was the lone vote for Lucius Fairchild on the 1st and 2nd ballots.)	1
Absent		1	1
Needed for majority		67	67
Total votes		132	132

=== Votes on January 28, 1875 ===
The legislature reconvened in joint session on January 28 and took three more votes. The three votes had nearly identical results; again no candidate reached a majority.

3rd, 4th, & 5th Votes of the 28th Wisconsin Legislature, January 28, 1875
Party	Candidate	Ballots		
Party	Candidate	3rd	4th	5th
Republican	Matthew H. Carpenter	59	59	59
Democratic	Edward S. Bragg	52	52	51 (Note: On the 5th ballot, Liberal Republican representative Job Grant switched his vote from Bragg to Stephen D. Carpenter.)
Republican	Orsamus Cole	18	17 (Note: On the 4th ballot, Republican representative John Bradley switched his support from Orsamus Cole to Angus Cameron.)	17
Republican	Luther S. Dixon	1	1	1
Republican	Horace Rublee	1 (Note: Republican representative Benjamin M. Coates was the lone vote for Horace Rublee on the 3rd, 4th, and 5th ballot.)	1	1
Republican	Romanzo Bunn	1 (Note: Republican representative Noah D. Comstock was the lone vote for Romanzo Bunn on the 3rd, 4th, 5th, 6th, 7th, 8th, and 9th ballots.)	1	1
Republican	Angus Cameron	0	1 (Note: Republican representative John Bradley was the lone vote for Angus Cameron on the 4th, 5th, 6th, 7th and 8th ballots.)	1
Democratic	Stephen D. Carpenter	0	0	1
Absent		1	1	1
Needed for majority		67	67	67
Total votes		132	132	132

=== Votes on January 29, 1875 ===
Two more votes were taken on January 29, with identical results.

6th & 7th Vote of the 28th Wisconsin Legislature, January 29, 1875
Party	Candidate	Votes	%	±%
Republican	Matthew H. Carpenter (incumbent)	60 (Note: On the 6th vote, Republican representative John H. Thomas switched his vote from Orsamus Cole to Matt Carpenter.)	45.45%	+1
Democratic	Edward S. Bragg	52 (Note: On the 6th ballot, Liberal Republican Job Grant switched his vote from Stephen D. Carpenter back to Bragg.)	39.39%	+1
Republican	Orsamus Cole	17 (Note: On the 6th ballot, Orsamus Cole lost the vote of Republican representative John H. Thomas, but gained the vote of Republican senator John Schuette.)	12.88%	
Republican	David Atwood	1 (Note: Republican representative Benjamin M. Coates was the lone vote for David Atwood on the 6th, 7th, and 8th ballots.)	0.76%	+1
Republican	Romanzo Bunn	1	0.76%	
Republican	Angus Cameron	1	0.76%	
Majority		67	50.76%	
Total votes		132	99.25%	
Void election result

=== Vote on January 30, 1875 ===
A larger number of legislators were absent from the votes on January 30 and February 1, reducing the number needed for a majority, but still no candidate could reach the threshold.

8th Vote of the 28th Wisconsin Legislature, January 30, 1875
Party	Candidate	Votes	%	±%
Republican	Matthew H. Carpenter (incumbent)	51	43.97%	−9
Democratic	Edward S. Bragg	44	37.93%	−8
Republican	Orsamus Cole	13	11.21%	−4
Republican	Joshua J. Guppey	3 (Note: On the 8th ballot, Joshua J. Guppey received votes from Republican senator Levi W. Barden and Republican representatives Robert Mitchell and John R. Rowlands (all had previously voted for Cole).)	2.59%	+3
Republican	David Atwood	1	0.86%	
Republican	Romanzo Bunn	1	0.86%	
Republican	Angus Cameron	1	0.86%	
Majority		58	50.88%	−9
Total votes		114	85.71%	-18
Void election result

=== Vote on February 1, 1875 ===
9th Vote of the 28th Wisconsin Legislature, February 1, 1875
Party	Candidate	Votes	%	±%
Republican	Matthew H. Carpenter (incumbent)	45	44.12%	−6
Democratic	Edward S. Bragg	37	36.27%	−7
Republican	Orsamus Cole	17	16.67%	+4
Republican	George Cochrane Hazelton	1 (Note: On the 9th ballot, Republican representative Benjamin M. Coates voted for Hazelton.)	0.98%	+1
Republican	Romanzo Bunn	1	0.98%	
Republican	William T. Price	1 (Note: On the 9th ballot, Reformer representative Richard Dewhurst voted for William T. Price.)	0.98%	+1
Majority		52	50.98%	−6
Total votes		102	76.69%	-12
Void election result

=== Vote on February 2, 1875 ===
10th Vote of the 28th Wisconsin Legislature, February 2, 1875
Party	Candidate	Votes	%	±%
Republican	Matthew H. Carpenter (incumbent)	59	46.09%	+14
Democratic	Edward S. Bragg	50	39.06%	+13
Republican	Orsamus Cole	17	13.28%	
Republican	George Cochrane Hazelton	2	1.56%	+1
Majority		65	50.78%	+13
Total votes		128	96.24%	+26
Void election result

=== Vote on February 3, 1875 ===
On the evening of February 2, 1875, the Democrats caucused with the holdout Republicans and agreed to a compromise candidate to merge their voting power—the caucus chose former speaker Angus Cameron. Wisconsin newspapers credited U.S. representative and railroad financier Alexander Mitchell with facilitating the negotiation. The legislature re-convened in joint session on February 3, and voted again, with nearly all the Democrats supporting Cameron, he achieving a majority on the 11th overall ballot.

11th Vote of the 28th Wisconsin Legislature, February 3, 1875
Party	Candidate	Votes	%	±%
Republican	Angus Cameron	68 (Note: On the 11th ballot, Cameron received the votes of all Democrats, Liberal Republicans, and Reformers, except for representative Bryan S. Lorigan (who voted for Carpenter)—49; he also received the votes of several Republicans, including senators Levi W. Barden, Robert C. Field, Sylvester Nevins, and John Schuette, and representatives John Anderson, Ole Anderson, Marcus Barden, John Bradley, Leroy S. Chase, Noah D. Comstock, Charles Dunlap, John B. Dwinnell, Gustav Gotze, Frank A. Leach, Robert Mitchell (Wisconsin politician), James E. Newell, Marvin Osborne, John R. Rowlands, and David E. Welch—19.)	52.52%	+68
Republican	Matthew H. Carpenter (incumbent)	59 (Note: On the 11th ballot, Carpenter received the votes of 58 of 81 Republicans. From the 10th ballot, he lost the votes of Republican representatives John Chandler Holloway (who voted for Dixon) and James Jeffery (who voted for Hazelton), and gained the votes of Republican representative John H. Thomas (who had previously been absent) and Democratic representative Bryan S. Lorigan (who previously voted for Bragg).)	44.70%	
Republican	George Cochrane Hazelton	3 (Note: On the 11th ballot, Hazelton received the votes of Republican representatives Benjamin M. Coates, James Jeffery, and Benjamin F. Washburn.)	2.27%	+1
Republican	Luther S. Dixon	1 (Note: On the 11th ballot, Republican senator John Chandler Holloway voted for Dixon.)	0.76%	+1
Republican	John G. Clark	1 (Note: On the 11th ballot, Republican representative Kearton Coates voted for Clark.)	0.76%	+1
Majority		67	50.76%	+2
Total votes		132	99.25%	+4
Republican hold				
