= William Frazier =

William Frazier may refer to:

- Wayne Frazier (William Wayne "Cotton" Frazier Sr., 1939–2012), American football player
- William Frazier (Wisconsin politician) (1833–1902), Wisconsin state legislator
- William Frazier (Virginia politician) (1812–1885), Virginia state legislator
- William H. Frazier (1838–?), state legislator in South Carolina
