= Senator Hodgson =

Senator Hodgson may refer to:

- Dawson Hodgson (born 1978), Rhode Island State Senate
- John Hodgson (Wisconsin politician) (1812–1869), Wisconsin State Senate
