= James Newell =

James Newell may refer to:

- James E. Newell (1808–?), member of the Wisconsin State Assembly
- James Michael Newell (1900–1985), WPA artist
