= Thomas Mohr =

Thomas Mohr may refer to:

- Thomas Mohr (politician)
- Thomas Mohr (tenor)
