= 1960 Wisconsin gubernatorial election =

- November 8, 1960
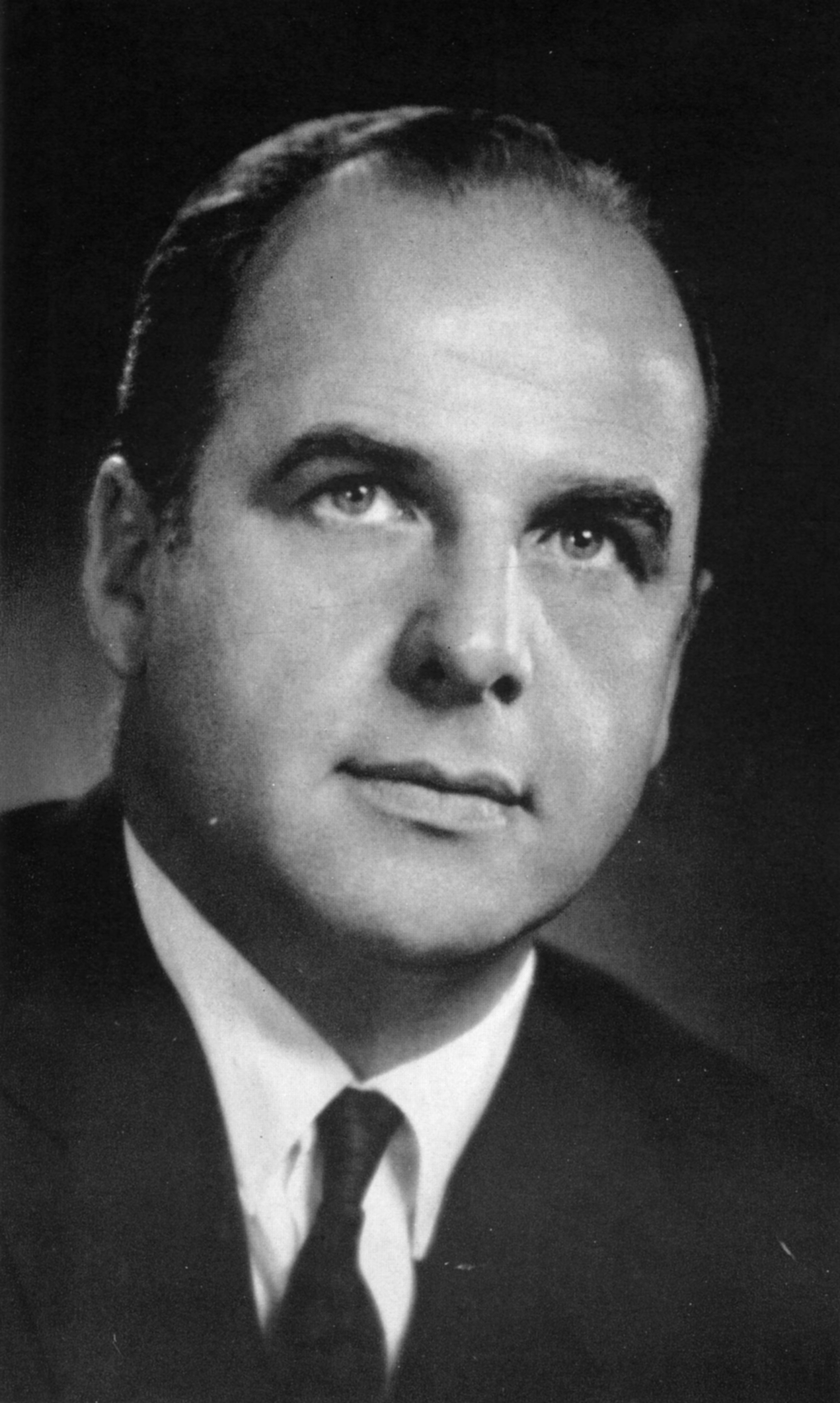

| Nominee | Gaylord A. Nelson | Philip G. Kuehn |
| Party | Democratic | Republican |
| Popular vote | 890,868 | 837,123 |
| Percentage | 51.55% | 48.44% |
- County results Nelson: 50–60% 60–70% 70–80% Kuehn: 50–60% 60–70% 70–80%
Governor before election
Gaylord A. Nelson
Democratic
Elected Governor
Gaylord A. Nelson
Democratic

The 1960 Wisconsin gubernatorial election was held on November 8, 1960. Democrat Gaylord A. Nelson won the election with 51.5% of the vote, retaining his position as Governor of Wisconsin.

The results were almost exactly the opposite of the simultaneous presidential election, with Nelson's margin of victory being about half a point narrower than that of Richard Nixon.

== Primary election ==
The primary election was held on September 13, 1960. Both major party candidates were unopposed in their respective primaries.

=== Democratic party ===
==== Candidates ====
- Gaylord A. Nelson, incumbent governor

==== Results ====
Democratic primary results
| Party | Candidate | Votes | % |
|---|---|---|---|
| Democratic | Gaylord A. Nelson (incumbent) | 258,141 | 100.00% |
| Total votes | | 258,141 | 100.00% |

=== Republican party ===
==== Candidates ====
- Philip G. Kuehn, former chairman of the Wisconsin Republican Party (1955–1958)

==== Results ====
Republican primary results
| Party | Candidate | Votes | % |
|---|---|---|---|
| Republican | Philip G. Kuehn | 286,398 | 100.00% |
| Total votes | | 286,398 | 100.00% |

== General election ==
=== Candidates ===
- Gaylord A. Nelson, Democrat
- Philip G. Kuehn, Republican

=== Results ===
1960 Wisconsin gubernatorial election
| Party | Candidate | Votes | % | ±% |
|---|---|---|---|---|
| Democratic | Gaylord A. Nelson (incumbent) | 890,868 | 51.55% | −2.04% |
| Republican | Philip G. Kuehn | 837,123 | 48.44% | +2.16% |
| | Scattering (Note: These are not listed in the Blue Book but are listed in the Board of Canvassers report.) | 18 | 0.00% | |
| Majority | | 53,745 | 3.11% | |
| Total votes | | 1,728,009 | 100.00% | |
| Democratic hold | | Swing | -4.20% | |

=== Results by county ===
Nelson was the first Democrat since William R. Taylor in 1873 to win Pierce County. Vernon County would not vote for Democratic again until 2002.

| County | Gaylord A. Nelson Democratic | | Philip G. Kuehn Republican | | Margin | | Total votes cast |
| County | # | % | # | % | # | % | Total votes cast |
|---|---|---|---|---|---|---|---|
| Adams | 1,752 | 48.73% | 1,842 | 51.24% | -90 | -2.50% | 3,595 (Note: Includes 1 Scattering vote) |
| Ashland | 4,816 | 60.49% | 3,145 | 39.51% | 1,671 | 20.99% | 7,961 |
| Barron | 7,463 | 49.94% | 7,481 | 50.06% | -18 | -0.12% | 14,944 |
| Bayfield | 3,659 | 61.06% | 2,333 | 38.94% | 1,326 | 22.13% | 5,992 |
| Brown | 26,542 | 50.47% | 26,044 | 49.53% | 498 | 0.95% | 52,586 |
| Buffalo | 3,086 | 50.64% | 3,008 | 49.36% | 78 | 1.28% | 6,094 |
| Burnett | 2,668 | 60.43% | 1,747 | 39.57% | 921 | 20.86% | 4,415 |
| Calumet | 4,125 | 43.51% | 5,356 | 56.49% | -1,231 | -12.98% | 9,481 |
| Chippewa | 10,485 | 56.24% | 8,157 | 43.76% | 2,328 | 12.49% | 18,642 |
| Clark | 6,581 | 48.94% | 6,867 | 51.06% | -286 | -2.13% | 13,448 |
| Columbia | 7,431 | 44.01% | 9,452 | 55.99% | -2,021 | -11.97% | 16,883 |
| Crawford | 3,705 | 52.59% | 3,340 | 47.41% | 365 | 5.18% | 7,045 |
| Dane | 56,601 | 61.53% | 35,387 | 38.47% | 21,214 | 23.06% | 91,989 |
| Dodge | 10,997 | 40.05% | 16,459 | 59.95% | -5,462 | -19.89% | 27,456 |
| Door | 3,679 | 39.48% | 5,639 | 60.52% | -1,960 | -21.03% | 9,318 |
| Douglas | 14,661 | 69.72% | 6,368 | 30.28% | 8,293 | 39.44% | 21,029 |
| Dunn | 5,383 | 48.62% | 5,688 | 51.38% | -305 | -2.75% | 11,071 |
| Eau Claire | 13,250 | 51.82% | 12,317 | 48.18% | 933 | 3.65% | 25,567 |
| Florence | 959 | 54.52% | 800 | 45.48% | 159 | 9.04% | 1,759 |
| Fond du Lac | 13,378 | 40.47% | 19,677 | 59.53% | -6,299 | -19.06% | 33,055 |
| Forest | 1,934 | 55.21% | 1,569 | 44.79% | 365 | 10.42% | 3,503 |
| Grant | 7,985 | 42.68% | 10,725 | 57.32% | -2,740 | -14.64% | 18,710 |
| Green | 4,224 | 36.36% | 7,393 | 63.64% | -3,169 | -27.28% | 11,617 |
| Green Lake | 2,677 | 33.71% | 5,263 | 66.28% | -2,586 | -32.57% | 7,941 |
| Iowa | 3,758 | 43.33% | 4,915 | 56.67% | -1,157 | -13.34% | 8,673 |
| Iron | 2,830 | 72.18% | 1,091 | 27.82% | 1,739 | 44.35% | 3,921 |
| Jackson | 3,324 | 49.92% | 3,334 | 50.08% | -10 | -0.15% | 6,658 |
| Jefferson | 10,146 | 44.25% | 12,781 | 55.75% | -2,635 | -11.49% | 22,927 |
| Juneau | 3,407 | 42.03% | 4,700 | 57.97% | -1,293 | -15.95% | 8,107 |
| Kenosha | 25,992 | 60.34% | 17,087 | 39.66% | 8,905 | 20.67% | 43,079 |
| Kewaunee | 4,250 | 51.99% | 3,925 | 48.01% | 325 | 3.98% | 8,175 |
| La Crosse | 16,081 | 49.34% | 16,510 | 50.66% | -429 | -1.32% | 32,591 |
| Lafayette | 3,913 | 46.63% | 4,478 | 53.37% | -565 | -6.73% | 8,391 |
| Langlade | 4,383 | 51.61% | 4,109 | 48.39% | 274 | 3.23% | 8,492 |
| Lincoln | 4,387 | 43.19% | 5,770 | 56.81% | -1,383 | -13.62% | 10,157 |
| Manitowoc | 17,910 | 54.74% | 14,811 | 45.26% | 3,099 | 9.47% | 32,721 |
| Marathon | 19,502 | 48.74% | 20,510 | 51.26% | -1,008 | -2.52% | 40,012 |
| Marinette | 7,323 | 46.92% | 8,286 | 53.08% | -963 | -6.17% | 15,609 |
| Marquette | 1,331 | 31.83% | 2,851 | 68.17% | -1,520 | -36.35% | 4,182 |
| Milwaukee | 263,410 | 59.08% | 182,413 | 40.91% | 80,997 | 18.17% | 445,836 (Note: Includes 13 Scattering votes) |
| Monroe | 5,819 | 45.76% | 6,897 | 54.24% | -1,078 | -8.48% | 12,716 |
| Oconto | 5,162 | 45.90% | 6,084 | 54.10% | -922 | -8.20% | 11,246 |
| Oneida | 5,400 | 50.79% | 5,232 | 49.21% | 168 | 1.58% | 10,632 |
| Outagamie | 17,459 | 42.11% | 23,999 | 57.89% | -6,540 | -15.78% | 41,458 |
| Ozaukee | 7,486 | 42.26% | 10,229 | 57.74% | -2,743 | -15.48% | 17,715 |
| Pepin | 1,754 | 53.97% | 1,495 | 46.00% | 259 | 7.97% | 3,250 |
| Pierce | 5,125 | 52.54% | 4,629 | 47.46% | 496 | 5.09% | 9,754 |
| Polk | 6,850 | 60.08% | 4,551 | 39.92% | 2,299 | 20.16% | 11,401 |
| Portage | 10,836 | 64.18% | 6,048 | 35.82% | 4,788 | 28.36% | 16,884 |
| Price | 3,445 | 49.61% | 3,498 | 50.37% | -53 | -0.76% | 6,944 |
| Racine | 34,289 | 56.69% | 26,195 | 43.31% | 8,094 | 13.38% | 60,484 |
| Richland | 3,425 | 41.75% | 4,779 | 58.25% | -1,354 | -16.50% | 8,204 |
| Rock | 20,890 | 42.81% | 27,911 | 57.19% | -7,021 | -14.39% | 48,801 |
| Rusk | 3,908 | 56.98% | 2,951 | 43.02% | 957 | 13.95% | 6,859 |
| Sauk | 7,386 | 43.52% | 9,584 | 56.48% | -2,198 | -12.95% | 16,970 |
| Sawyer | 2,417 | 48.89% | 2,527 | 51.11% | -110 | -2.22% | 4,944 |
| Shawano | 5,352 | 36.91% | 9,150 | 63.09% | -3,798 | -26.19% | 14,502 |
| Sheboygan | 20,102 | 49.62% | 20,412 | 50.38% | -310 | -0.77% | 40,514 |
| St. Croix | 7,728 | 58.40% | 5,506 | 41.60% | 2,222 | 16.79% | 13,234 |
| Taylor | 3,954 | 54.78% | 3,264 | 45.22% | 690 | 9.56% | 7,218 |
| Trempealeau | 5,686 | 54.80% | 4,690 | 45.20% | 996 | 9.60% | 10,376 |
| Vernon | 5,978 | 50.87% | 5,774 | 49.13% | 204 | 1.74% | 11,752 |
| Vilas | 1,989 | 36.82% | 3,413 | 63.18% | -1,424 | -26.36% | 5,402 |
| Walworth | 8,218 | 33.87% | 16,045 | 66.13% | -7,827 | -32.26% | 24,263 |
| Washburn | 2,591 | 50.52% | 2,538 | 49.48% | 53 | 1.03% | 5,129 |
| Washington | 8,151 | 40.89% | 11,782 | 59.11% | -3,631 | -18.22% | 19,933 |
| Waukesha | 31,281 | 45.43% | 37,577 | 54.57% | -6,296 | -9.14% | 68,858 |
| Waupaca | 5,291 | 31.31% | 11,607 | 68.69% | -6,316 | -37.38% | 16,898 |
| Waushara | 2,035 | 29.99% | 4,751 | 70.01% | -2,716 | -40.02% | 6,786 |
| Winnebago | 19,210 | 41.52% | 27,053 | 58.48% | -7,843 | -16.95% | 46,263 |
| Wood | 11,663 | 46.68% | 13,324 | 53.32% | -1,661 | -6.65% | 24,987 |
| Total | 890,868 | 51.55% | 837,123 | 48.44% | 53,745 | 3.11% | 1,728,009 |

==== Counties that flipped from Republican to Democratic ====
- Brown
- Buffalo
- Crawford
- Kewaunee
- Pepin
- Pierce
- Washburn

==== Counties that flipped from Democratic to Republican ====
- Adams
- Barron
- Jackson
- Jefferson
- La Crosse
- Lincoln
- Marathon
- Price
- Sheboygan
- Vilas
