= Bryan S. Lorigan =

19th century American politician

Member of the Wisconsin State Assembly from the Manitowoc 2nd district
- In office January 5, 1874 – January 3, 1876
- Preceded by: Orsamus S. Davis
- Succeeded by: Thomas Mohr

Member of the Board of Supervisors of Manitowoc County, Wisconsin
- In office January 1866 – January 1870

Personal details
- Born: March 10, 1824 County Limerick, Ireland, UK
- Died: October 31, 1895 (aged 71) Franklin, Manitowoc County, Wisconsin, U.S.
- Resting place: Saint Patrick Catholic Cemetery, Maple Grove, Manitowoc County, Wisconsin
- Party: Democratic
- Spouse: Margaret O'Grady
- Children: Margaret A. (Watt)^{(b. 1856; died 1935)}; Bartholomew W. Lorigan^{(b. 1858; died 1888)}; Mary (Watt)^{(b. 1860; died 1921)}; Michael J. Lorrigan^{(b. 1861; died 1893)}; Daniel F. Lorrigan^{(b. 1863; died 1936)}; Ellen "Nellie" (Moloney)^{(b. 1868; died 1949)}; Josephine "Josie" (Mullins)^{(b. 1870; died 1940)}; Johanah Lorigan^{(b. 1872)}
- Occupation: Farmer, politician

Bryan S. Lorigan (March 10, 1824 – October 31, 1895) was an Irish American immigrant, farmer, Democratic politician, and Wisconsin pioneer. He served two terms in the Wisconsin State Assembly, representing northern Manitowoc County during the 1874 and 1875 terms. As an early settler in Manitowoc County, he was one of the founders of the first Catholic church in the county, St. Patrick's Church in Maple Grove.

== Biography ==
Bryan Lorigan was born in County Limerick, Ireland, in 1824. He was raised and educated in Ireland, emigrating to the United States with his wife about 1851. After remaining in New York for a time, they settled in Manitowoc, Wisconsin, about 1852. He worked for several years for Platt & Vilas, a lumbering and shipping business, and earned enough money to purchase a plot of farm land in what is now the town of Franklin, Manitowoc County, Wisconsin, (Note: At the time of his purchase, this area was still part of the town of Maple Grove.) which became his home for the rest of his life. At his home, Lorigan hosted a meeting of fourteen Catholic settlers, where they established the first Catholic parish in the county, later constructing and inhabiting St. Patrick's Church in Maple Grove.

Lorigan became active in politics with the Democratic Party of Wisconsin in the 1860s, and apparently endorsed anti-war Copperhead positions. In 1865, Lorigan was elected to the Manitowoc County board of supervisors. The following year, he ran for sheriff, but lost the election to Robert T. Blake. Shortly after the 1866 election, Lorigan was named postmaster of the Paquette post office, located in the town of Franklin. Lorigan was also re-elected to the county board in the fall of 1867. He sought the Democratic nomination for sheriff again in 1868, but was not nominated.

In 1873, Lorigan was the Democratic nominee for Wisconsin State Assembly in Manitowoc County's 2nd Assembly district, comprising roughly the northwest quadrant of the county. He was re-elected to another one-year term in 1874. Lorigan's time in the Legislature coincided with the brief success of the Democratic Reform coalition in Wisconsin, gaining legislative power for the first time since the 1850s. In the 1875 term, the large Democratic vote-share significantly affected the outcome of the election for United States senator. Lorigan, with the other Reform caucus members, supported Edward S. Bragg for senator, though their caucus was not large enough to prevail. But the election was thrown into doubt when a faction of Republicans refused to support the incumbent senator Matthew H. Carpenter. After a week-long stalemate, the Democratic/Reform caucus agreed to a coalition with the Republican rebels to elect Angus Cameron. During the final ballot, Lorigan initially voted for Democrat Charles D. Robinson, then switched his vote to Cameron, but then switched his vote to Carpenter as the vote was closing. Cameron was elected by a margin of just one vote, and the political press was baffled by Lorigan's shift; his local newspaper, the Manitowoc Pilot noted that Lorigan had campaigned vigorously against Carpenter in the 1874 general election. Lorigan did not run for re-election in 1875.

Lorigan was largely retired from politics after 1875. He died at his home in Franklin on October 31, 1895.

== Personal life and family ==
Bryan Lorigan was one of at least two children of Bartholomew Lorigan. Bryan's younger brother, Edward P. Lorigan, became a prominent Catholic priest in Wisconsin and later Seattle.

Bryan Lorigan married Margaret O'Grady in Ireland before they emigrated to the United States. They had at least eight children, all of which were born in the United States. Their eldest son, Bartholomew W. Lorigan, also became a Catholic priest in Wisconsin, but died of a lung disease just a few months after his ordination, at age 30.

== Notes ==
Wisconsin State Assembly
Preceded by Orsamus S. Davis	Member of the Wisconsin State Assembly from the Manitowoc 2nd district January 5, 1874 – January 3, 1876	Succeeded by Thomas Mohr
