= Senator Frazier =

Senator Frazier may refer to:

== Members of the United States Senate ==
- James B. Frazier (1856–1937), U.S. Senator from Tennessee from 1905 to 1911
- Lynn Frazier (1874–1947), U.S. Senator from North Dakota from 1923 to 1941

== United States state senate members ==
- Bill Frazier (politician) (born 1936), Indiana State Senate
- Hillman Terome Frazier (born 1950), Mississippi State Senate
- William Frazier (Virginia politician) (1812–1885), Virginia State Senate

== See also ==
- Senator Fraser (disambiguation)
