= Waldo Flint =

American politician (1820–1900)

Waldo S. Flint

Member of the Wisconsin Senate
- In office January 1, 1872 – January 6, 1873
- Preceded by: William M. Griswold
- Succeeded by: Robert L. D. Potter
- Constituency: 25th district
- In office January 2, 1871 – January 1, 1872
- Preceded by: Henry G. Webb
- Succeeded by: Eliphalet S. Miner
- Constituency: 29th district

Member of the Wisconsin State Assembly from the Green Lake district
- In office January 3, 1876 – January 1, 1877
- Preceded by: William H. Dakin
- Succeeded by: Homer Nelson

Personal details
- Born: February 23, 1820 Braintree, Vermont, U.S.
- Died: October 1, 1900 (aged 80) Nashua, Iowa, U.S.
- Resting place: Oak Hill Cemetery, Nashua, Iowa
- Party: Republican
- Spouse: Sarah Jane Rosebrook (died 1908)
- Children: Edwin Waldo Flint^{(b. 1854; died 1921)}; Charles Milton Flint^{(b. 1858; died 1931)}; Carrie (Cutler)^{(b. 1862; died 1891)}
- Relatives: Edwin Flint (brother)

Waldo Samuel Flint (February 23, 1820 – October 1, 1900) was an American farmer, nurseryman, and Republican politician. He served two years in the Wisconsin State Senate, representing Green Lake County and central Wisconsin.

== Biography ==
Flint was born on February 23, 1820, in Braintree, Vermont. He moved to Rochester, Wisconsin Territory, in 1842 and then to Princeton, Wisconsin, in 1850. He moved to a farm near Nashua, Iowa, in 1876, and then to Nashua in 1893. Flint died in Nashua on October 1, 1900.

== Career ==
Flint was a member of the Senate from 1871 until 1873. He ran as an Independent Republican, defeating Republican candidate James A. Briggs. He was initially elected in the 29th Senate district, but by the enaction of the 1871 redistricting act, he became the representative of the 25th Senate district. Additionally, he was President of Princeton and Chairman of the Green Lake County, Wisconsin, Board of Supervisors. He was a Republican.

== Personal life and family ==
Flint's older brother Edwin Flint also served in the Wisconsin Senate and was a Wisconsin circuit court judge.

Wisconsin State Assembly
Preceded by William H. Dakin	Member of the Wisconsin State Assembly from the Green Lake district January 3, 1876 – January 1, 1877	Succeeded by Homer Nelson
Wisconsin Senate
Preceded by Henry G. Webb	Member of the Wisconsin Senate from the 29th district January 2, 1871 – January 1, 1872	Succeeded by Eliphalet S. Miner
Preceded by William M. Griswold	Member of the Wisconsin Senate from the 25th district January 1, 1872 – January 6, 1873	Succeeded by Robert L. D. Potter
