= William H. Dakin =

19th century American politician

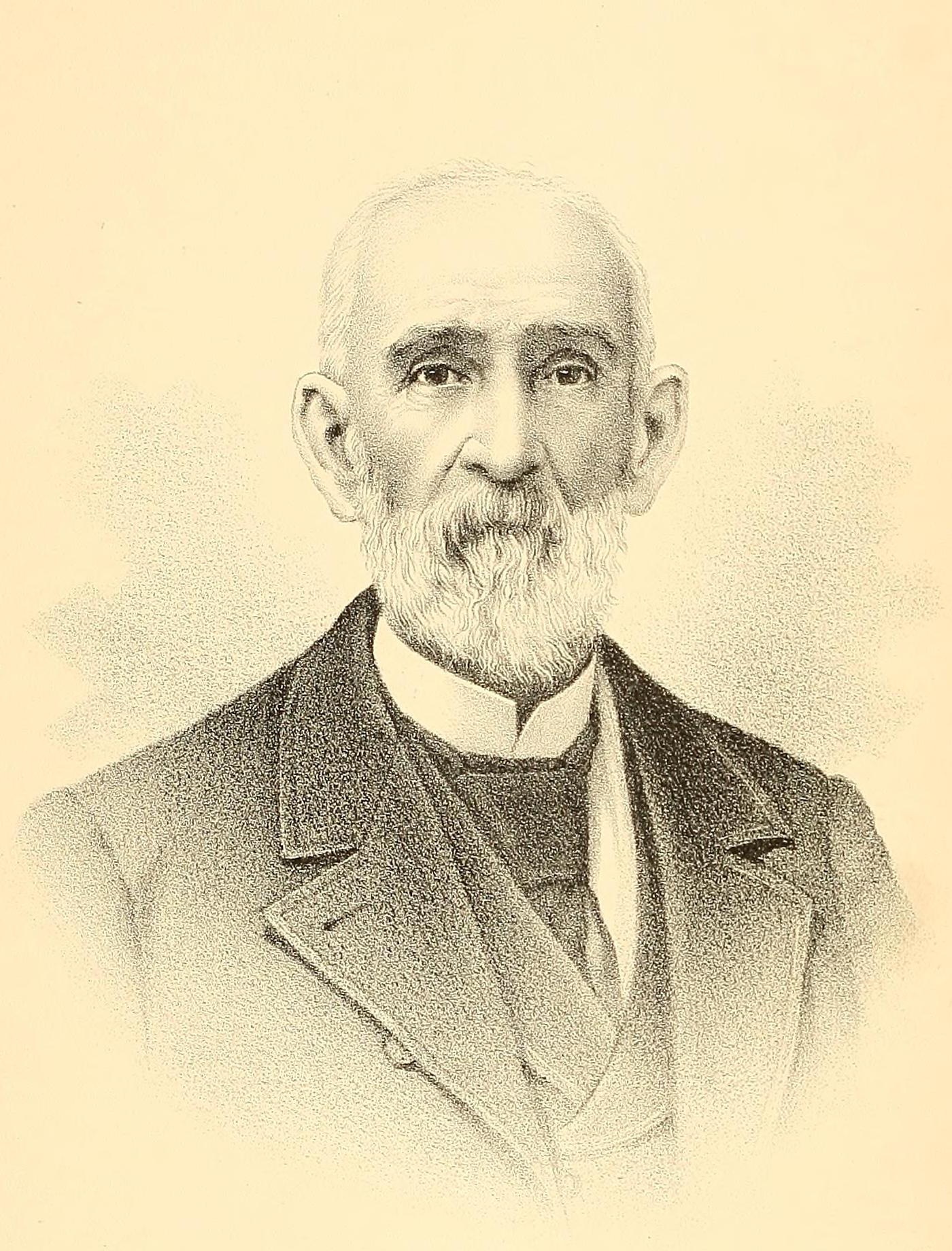
- From Portrait and biographical album of Green Lake, Marquette and Waushara counties, Wisconsin (1890)

Member of the Wisconsin State Assembly from the Green Lake district
- In office January 4, 1875 – January 3, 1876
- Preceded by: Seymour M. Knox
- Succeeded by: Waldo Flint

Personal details
- Born: August 8, 1816 Poughkeepsie, New York, U.S.
- Died: August 20, 1892 (aged 76)
- Resting place: Hillside Cemetery, Ripon, Wisconsin
- Party: Republican; Democratic (before 1862)
- Spouse: none
- Children: none

William Henry Dakin (August 8, 1816 – August 20, 1892) was an American farmer, politician, and Wisconsin pioneer. He served in the Wisconsin State Assembly, representing Green Lake County during the 1875 session. He was the first settler in the town of Brooklyn, Green Lake County, Wisconsin.

== Biography ==
William H. Dakin was born in Dutchess County, New York, in August 1816. He attended public and private schools and finished his education at the Poughkeepsie Academy. When he was 17 years old, he went to live with his brother-in-law, and then sailed to South America, visiting several countries. He returned to New York and resided there until 1843, when he left for the Wisconsin Territory.

He purchased land in the area that would become Green Lake County, at the time it was still part of Marquette County. After making some additional travel to gather livestock and provisions, he set to work clearing and sowing his farm. Over the subsequent years, he purchased a great deal of additional land in Green Lake County, some of which he dealt off in parcels to new settlers, but Dakin retained over 3000 acres for his own use for a number of years.

He served as a member of the county commission (predecessor to the county board of supervisors) and was treasurer of Marquette County before Green Lake County was created. He also served as chairman of the town board of Brooklyn for several years. During his term as town chairman, the town was involved in a protracted legal dispute with the Sheboygan and Fond du Lac Railroad. Through Dakin's work on the settlement, the county saved about $13,000.

He was originally a supporter of the Democratic Party, but became a Republican after the American Civil War. He was elected on the Republican ticket to the Wisconsin State Assembly in 1874, and served in the 1875 session. He was not a candidate for re-election in 1875.

== Electoral history ==
=== Wisconsin Assembly (1874) ===
Wisconsin Assembly, Green Lake District Election, 1874
Party	Candidate	Votes	%	±%
General Election, November 3, 1874
Republican	William H. Dakin	1,248	52.24%	
Democratic	O. W. Bow	1,141	47.76%	
Plurality		107	4.48%	
Total votes		2,389	100.0%	+75.79%
Republican hold				

Wisconsin State Assembly
Preceded by Seymour M. Knox	Member of the Wisconsin State Assembly from the Green Lake district January 4, 1875 – January 3, 1876	Succeeded by Waldo Flint
