= Senator Fraser =

Senator Fraser may refer to:

- Donald M. Fraser (1924–2019), Minnesota State Senate
- Edwin Fraser (1914–1978), Florida State Senate
- Karen Fraser (born 1944), Washington State Senate
- Leo Fraser (1926–2013), New Hampshire State Senate
- Thomas Fraser (California politician) (1833–1902), California State Senate
- Troy Fraser (born 1949), Texas State Senate

== See also ==
- Senator Frazier (disambiguation)
