= Samuel Hasey =

American politician

Samuel B. Hasey (July 24, 1822 – September 6, 1912) was a member of the Wisconsin State Assembly in 1874. Additionally, he was chairman of the Town Board of Elba, Wisconsin in 1853, of York, Dane County, Wisconsin in 1866 and of Hampden, Wisconsin in 1871. He was a Republican.

Hasey was born on July 24, 1822, in Londonderry, Vermont. He married Mary Emeline Anderson (1826–1922) in 1852. He died in 1912 and was buried in Columbus, Wisconsin. Together with his brothers John and Alfred, Samuel Hasey was well known as one of three 90-year-old brothers living in Columbus in 1912.
