= Henry C. Barnard =

American politician

Henry C. Barnard (born 1837) was an American politician. He was a member of the Wisconsin State Assembly. Barnard was born on January 19, 1837, in St. Charles County, Missouri. He was a merchant by trade. Barnard was a member of the Assembly during the 1870 and 1871 sessions. Previously, he had been an unsuccessful candidate in 1868, losing to William E. Rowe. He was a Democrat.
