= Ansley Gray =

American politician

Ansley Gray (May 20, 1854 – February 3, 1889) was a member of the Wisconsin State Assembly.

== Biography ==
Gray was born on May 20, 1854, in Mineral Point, Wisconsin. He attended Beloit College and the University of Wisconsin Law School. Gray died at his home in Oberlin, Ohio, on February 3, 1889.

== Career ==
Gray was elected to the Assembly in 1875, succeeding Owen King. He was a member of the Reform Party. He then became a member of the Temperance movement, delivering lectures at Chautauqua assemblies.
