= Owen King (politician) =

American politician (1845–1932)

Owen King (September 17, 1845 – October 31, 1932) was a lumber dealer from Helena, Wisconsin, who served two terms in the Wisconsin State Assembly representing part of Iowa County, being elected in 1874 as a Reform Party member, then in 1877 as a Greenbacker.

== Background ==
King was born September 17, 1845, in New London, Prince Edward Island, Canada. He received a common school education, as well as attending college for a while; and became a lumber dealer. King came to Wisconsin in 1850, and settled in Wyoming in Iowa County. He was elected town clerk in 1871.

== Legislative office ==
In 1874, he received 1,387 votes as the candidate of the "Reform" or "People's Reform" Party (a coalition of Democrats, reform and Liberal Republicans, and Grangers which had secured the election of William Robert Taylor as Governor in 1873) against 1,002 for Republican Halgrim Halgrimson. Incumbent William E. Rowe, who had served as a "Free Trader", was not a candidate for re-election in Iowa County's first Assembly district, which included the Towns of Arena, Clyde, Dodgeville, Highland, Pulaski, Ridgeway and Wyoming.

He was not a candidate for re-election in 1875, and was succeeded by fellow Reformer Ansley Gray. In 1877, he ran again from the first district as an "Independent Greenback", winning with 954 votes to 702 for Republican Jesse P. Smelker and 576 for Democrat David McFarland (Democratic incumbent Robert Kinzie was not a candidate). He was assigned to the committee on insurance, banks and banking. He was not a candidate for re-election in 1878, and was succeeded by fellow Greenback George L. Frost.

== Later years ==
King died on October 31, 1932, at his home, in Spring Green, Wisconsin.
