= George L. Frost =

American lawyer & politician (1830–1879)

George Lombard Frost (March 18, 1830 – February 15, 1879) was an American lawyer from Dodgeville, Wisconsin who served in the Wisconsin Senate as a Democrat and later in the Wisconsin State Assembly as a Greenback.

== Background ==
Born in Springfield, Massachusetts, Frost graduated from Williston Academy in Easthampton, Massachusetts in June, 1846; from Yale College in 1850, and from Harvard Law School in 1852, becoming a lawyer. He came to Wisconsin in 1853, and settled in Iowa County.

== Public offices ==
Frost was city superintendent of schools in Mineral Point in 1832, and was elected district attorney in 1851 and 1856. He was elected as a Democratic state senator from the 15th District (Iowa County) in 1863 and 1864, and ran unsuccessfully for circuit court judge in the latter year. He was succeeded in the Senate by W. L. Lincoln of the Union Party (as the Republicans were called at the time).

He was elected to the Assembly in 1878 as a Greenback, receiving 1,154 votes to 862 for Republican Robert L. Joiner, and 697 for Democratic candidate former Assemblyman William E. Rowe (Greenback incumbent Owen King was not a candidate). He was not a candidate for re-election in 1879, and was succeeded by Democrat Richard Kennedy. He died of pneumonia in Madison, Wisconsin while the Wisconsin State Legislature was in session.
