= John Kehl =

American politician

John B. Kehl (December 14, 1837 – September 12, 1909) was an American merchant, miller, logger and banker from Wisconsin who served a one-year term as a member of the Wisconsin State Assembly from Dane County before eventually settling in Chippewa Falls.

== Background ==
Kehl was born December 14, 1837, in Schwabsburg near Oppenheim in the Grand Duchy of Hesse, the son of Peter Kehl, who came to Milwaukee in April, 1845, remaining there about five months, then settled with his family in Sauk City. They lived there until 1855, when they moved to the town of Roxbury in Dane County. The elder Kehl began practicing viniculture in 1850, becoming the pioneer of that industry in Wisconsin.

In July, 1860, Kehl went into the mercantile business for himself. In 1866 Kehl switched from being a merchant to milling, doing commercial and custom milling at Blue Mounds. He settled in Vermont, Wisconsin.

== Public office ==
Having held several local office, Kehl was elected to the Assembly for a one-year term in 1873, representing the Third District of Dane County (the Towns of Towns of Berry, Black Earth, Cross Plains, Dane, Mazomanie, Roxbury, Springfield, Vermont, Vienna and Westport). He was elected as a Democrat, with 1,162 votes, to 598 for Republican W. N. Hawes (the incumbent, Democrat Otto Kerl, was not a candidate); but in the 1874 Wisconsin Blue Book chose to list himself as a "Conservative Democrat", to distinguish himself from the majority of Wisconsin Democratic legislators who had affiliated with the Reform Party, a short-lived coalition of Democrats, reform and Liberal Republicans, and Grangers formed in 1873, which had secured the election of William Robert Taylor as Governor of Wisconsin, as well as electing a number of state legislators. He was the only Democrat to do so. He was assigned to the standing committee on state affairs.

Having left Dane County by the time of the 1874 election, he was not a candidate for re-election; he was succeeded by fellow Democrat David Ford.

In the spring of 1874, Kehl came to Chippewa Falls and began construction of the Glen Mills, one and a half miles from Chippewa Falls. In the winter of 1875-76, he went into logging, and continued logging operations in connection with his other affairs. He operated the Glen Flouring Mills for A. E. Pound & Co., from 1876 to 1878, when he purchased the business for himself. In 1875, he became interested in the First National Bank as stockholder and director, and became vice-president of the bank. He had extensive investments in real estate in Dane and Sauk counties, and was a director of the company that published the Chippewa County Independent.

== Personal life ==
Kehl was married in Livingston, New Jersey, on September 9, 1863, to Susie F. Wright, a native of that town, born in 1840. They had three children (Jessie I., Ida Stella, and Frederick W.). John Kehl was a member of the German Reformed Church. He died on September 12, 1909.
