= Asahel Henderson =

American politician

Asahel Henderson was a member of the Wisconsin State Assembly during the 1874 session. In addition, he chaired the town board (similar to city council) of Beloit (town), Wisconsin. Henderson was a Republican. He was born on October 15, 1815, in Royalton, New York.
