= Manville S. Hodgson =

American politician

Manville S. Hodgson (May 3, 1843 – December 25, 1928) was a member of the Wisconsin State Assembly.

== Biography ==
Hodgson was born in 1843 in Pewaukee, Wisconsin, . He attended Carroll College. During the American Civil War, Hodgson served with the 17th Michigan Volunteer Infantry Regiment of the Union Army under Ulysses S. Grant. Engagements he took part in include the Siege of Vicksburg. On January 25, 1879, he married Jessie North.

His father, John Hodgson, was a member of the Wisconsin State Senate

He died in Denver, aged 85.

== Assembly career ==
Hodgson was a member of the Assembly from 1874 to 1875. He was a Republican.
