= Thomas S. Weeks =

American politician

Thomas S. Weeks (December 16, 1833 – February 5, 1910) was an American politician and gunsmith.

Weeks was a member of the Wisconsin State Assembly in 1874 as a Democrat. Weeks was born on December 16, 1833, in Monroe, New York. He settled in Fond du Lac, Wisconsin in 1850 and was a gunsmith, and also ran a gun shop.

He died in Fond du Lac on February 5, 1910.
