= John Hodgson (Wisconsin politician) =

American politician

John Hodgson was a member of the Wisconsin State Senate.

== Biography ==
Hodgson was born in Yorkshire, England in 1812. In 1840, he married Cassandra M. Blake in Pontiac, Michigan. They would have six children, including Manville S. Hodgson, before her death on January 5, 1860. In December of that year, Hodgson married Esther Enos. He had settled in what is now Waukesha County, Wisconsin in 1842. Hodgson died there on December 22, 1869.

== Senate career ==
Hodgson was elected to the Senate in 1861. He was a Republican.
