= Homer Nelson (Wisconsin politician) =

American politician (1826–1894)

Homer Nelson (February 6, 1826 – May 21, 1894) was a member of the Wisconsin State Assembly during the 1877 session.

Nelson was born on February 6, 1826, in Hebron, New York. He owned a farm in Portage County. Nelson served as treasurer of Green Lake County, Wisconsin. He was a Republican.
