= William H. Frazier =

State legislator in South Carolina

William H. Frazier (born c. 1838) was a state legislator in South Carolina. He represented Colleton County, South Carolina in the South Carolina House of Representatives from 1872 to 1874.

He served on the Committee on Retrenchment and Reform. He was.an African American.

== See also ==
- African American officeholders from the end of the Civil War until before 1900
