= Jonathan G. Callahan =

American politician

Jonathan Gardner Callahan was an American politician. He was member of the Wisconsin State Assembly.

== Biography ==
Callahan was born on November 2, 1823, in Andover, Massachusetts. He attended Phillips Academy. A Presbyterian, Callahan married Maria S. Johns on April 19, 1849. They had two children.

== Career ==
Callahan was a member of the Assembly during the 1875 session. Additionally, he was President (similar to Mayor) of Eau Claire, Wisconsin. He was a Republican.
