= Henry J. Clasen =

American politician

Henry J. Clasen (February 10, 1829 – September 29, 1907) was an American businessman and politician.

Born in Mecklenburg-Schwerin, Germany, Clasen went to Quebec, Canada and then went to Milwaukee, Wisconsin. He then settled in Brookfield, Wisconsin where he operated a sawmill, a farm, and a store. He served as postmaster. In 1874, Clasen served in the Wisconsin State Assembly and was a Democrat. He also served as county treasurer for Waukesha County, Wisconsin. Clasen died in Waukesha, Wisconsin.
