= Lemuel Ellsworth =

American politician

Lemuel Ellsworth (1836–1898) was a member of the Wisconsin State Assembly.

== Biography ==
Ellsworth was born on December 27, 1836, in Esopus, New York. He moved to Milwaukee, Wisconsin, in 1857. On January 2, 1860, Ellsworth married Helen "Nellie" Lucinda Jones (1841–1881). They would have four children. Ellsworth died September 4, 1898, in Milwaukee.

== Career ==
Ellsworth was a member of the Assembly during the 1875 and 1876 sessions. Additionally, he was elected County Treasurer of Milwaukee County, Wisconsin, in 1873 and 1880. He was a Republican.
