= John Dunn Jr. (assemblyman) =

American politician

John Dunn Jr. (June 12, 1827 – September 14, 1909) was a member of the Wisconsin State Assembly.

Dunn was born on June 12, 1827, in Kilkenny, Ireland. He emigrated to the United States around 1843 and settled in Poughkeepsie, New York, and he then relocated to Mapleton, Wisconsin, in 1849. He served as justice of the peace and town clerk in Mapleton, and also served two terms in the assembly, in 1873 and 1877. He was a Democrat and lived in Ashippun, Wisconsin.
