= Wilson R. Herron =

American politician

Wilson R. Herron was a member of the Wisconsin State Assembly.

== Biography ==
Herron was born on November 8, 1830, reports have differed on the location. He died on August 12, 1895.

== Career ==
Herron was a member of the Assembly during the 1874 and 1877 sessions. Additionally, he was Postmaster and Chairman of the Board of Supervisors of Sharon, Walworth County, Wisconsin. He was a Republican.
