= William E. Rowe =

American politician

William Earnest Rowe (May 27, 1820 – November 8, 1888) was an American farmer and miller from Arena, Wisconsin who served four one-year terms as a member of the Wisconsin State Assembly.

== Background ==
Born in St. James parish of St Kew, Cornwall, Rowe received a common school education. He came to Wisconsin in 1836, and became a farmer and miller. He first lived in Blue Mounds at the same time as a John Rowe, was elected to that town's school board and is described as being one of the "important citizens in 1848, at the organization of the town government". He moved to Iowa County in 1849 and to Idaho Territory in 1862; after living there for five years he returned to Arena, Wisconsin, in 1866. He died in 1888.

== Legislative service ==
Rowe was elected to the Assembly in 1868, succeeding Republican incumbent Jefferson Rewey, defeating Democrat Henry C. Barnard by four votes. He ran in 1869 as a Republican, and was defeated by Barnard, 862 to 776. He was elected in 1871 as a "Free Trader", with 1,042 votes to 786 for Republican John Edwards (incumbent Barnard was not a candidate). He defeated Republican challengers in 1872 and 1873, but did not run for re-election in 1874, and was succeeded by Reform Party candidate Owen King.

In 1878, he ran again for the Assembly as a Democrat, losing to Greenback George L. Frost, who polled 1,154 votes to 862 for Republican Robert L. Joiner, and 697 for Rowe.
