= John Harsh =

American farmer and politician

John Harsh (September 25, 1825 – May 10, 1906) was an American farmer and politician.

Born in Warren, Ohio, Harsh settled in Milford, Jefferson County, Wisconsin, in 1850 and then moved to the town of Stockbridge, Calumet County, Wisconsin, where he had a farm, in 1852. Harsh enlisted in the Union Army during the American Civil War and was stationed in the commissary department in Saint Louis, Missouri. While in the Union Army, Harsh was stricken with typhoid fever and was sent home. He tried to reenlist in the army but was rejected because of his physical condition. During that time, Harsh served as chairman and supervisor of the Stockbridge Town Board. In 1875, Harsh served in the Wisconsin State Assembly as a Republican. In 1886, Harsh, his wife, and family moved to Oshkosh, Wisconsin. Harsh was also involved with the banking business. Harsh died at his home in Oshkosh, Wisconsin of pneumonia.
