= Kearton Coates =

American politician

Kearton Coates (May 13, 1820 – April 16, 1893) was a member of the Wisconsin State Assembly.

He was born in Gunnerside, England. He moved to Platteville, Wisconsin, in 1842 and to Linden, Wisconsin, in 1844. He and his wife had 15 children. Coates is buried in Edmund, Wisconsin.

== Career ==
Coates became a member of the Assembly in 1875. Previously, Coates was Chairman and Assesor of Linden and Register of Deeds and Superintendent of the Poor of Iowa County, Wisconsin. In 1873, he was an unsuccessful candidate for county judge. He was a Republican.
