= John Bradley (Wisconsin politician) =

American politician

John Bradley was a member of the Wisconsin State Assembly.

== Biography ==
Bradley was born on April 29, 1817, in Bantam, Connecticut. In 1844, he moved to Trenton, Dodge County, Wisconsin Territory, where he would work as a farmer. On November 26, 1846, Bradley married Elizabeth Stevens. They would have six children. Bradley moved to Burns, Wisconsin, in 1855 and again was a farmer. He died on April 8, 1902.

== Political career ==
Bradley was a member of the Assembly in 1875, 1876, 1879, 1880, and 1881. Previously, he had been elected a town supervisor of Burns in 1861 and 1873. He was a Republican.
