= Benjamin M. Coates =

American politician

Benjamin M. Coates (September 8, 1819 – August 26, 1880) was an American miner, businessman, and politician. He served two terms in the Wisconsin State Assembly.

== Biography ==
Born in New Harmony, Indiana, Coates moved as a young man to Platteville, Wisconsin, where he became involved in lead mining.

He moved to California in 1849 as part of the gold rush and returned to Wisconsin in 1853. He operated a linseed mill and was in the merchandise business. In 1863, he moved to Boscobel, Wisconsin, where he went into banking.

Coates entered politics and was elected to the Wisconsin State Assembly, serving in 1869 and 1875. He was a Republican.

He died in Boscobel, Wisconsin.
