= Hampden, Wisconsin =

- Town
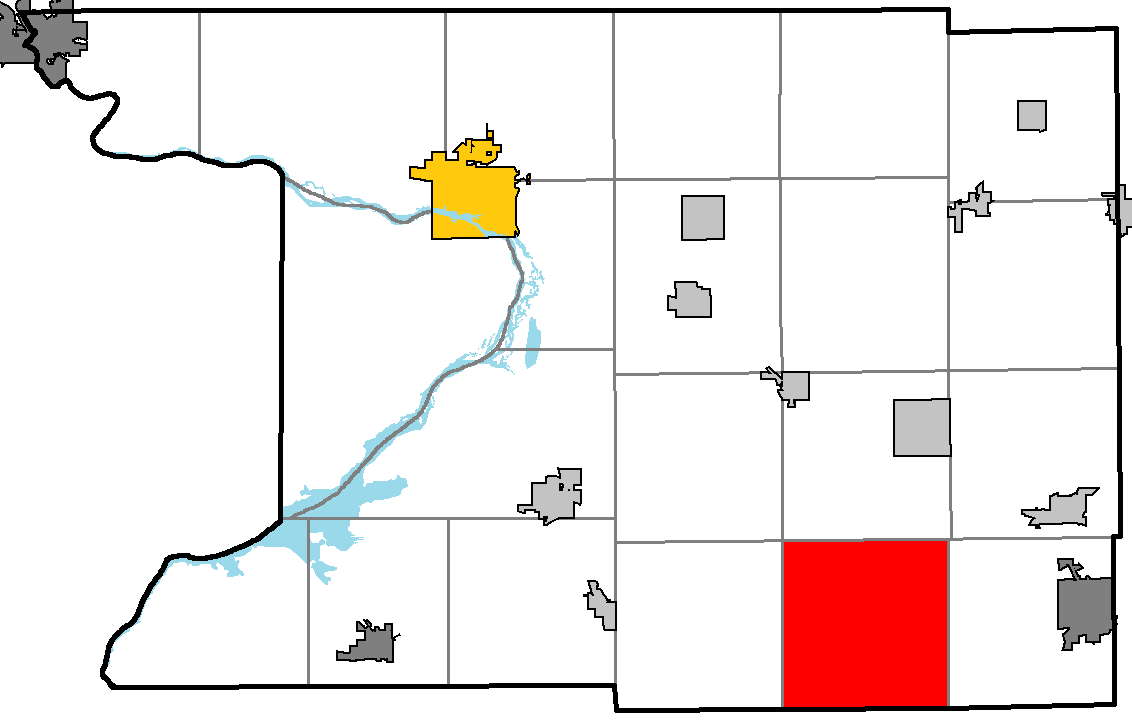
- Location of Hampden, within Columbia County, Wisconsin

- Location of Columbia County, Wisconsin
- Coordinates: 43°20′22″N 89°11′49″W
- Country: United States
- State: Wisconsin
- County: Columbia

Area
  - Total: 35.7 sq mi (92.4 km^{2})
  - Land: 35.7 sq mi (92.4 km^{2})
  - Water: 0.039 sq mi (0.1 km^{2})
- Elevation: 938 ft (286 m)

Population (2020)
  - Total: 581
  - Density: 16.3/sq mi (6.29/km^{2})
- Time zone: UTC-6 (Central (CST))
  - Summer (DST): UTC-5 (CDT)
- FIPS code: 55-32375
- GNIS feature ID: 1583344
- Website: https://townofhampden.wi.gov/

Hampden is a town in Columbia County, Wisconsin, United States. The population was 581 at the 2020 census.

== Geography ==
According to the United States Census Bureau, the town has a total area of 35.7 square miles (92.4 km^{2}), of which 35.7 square miles (92.4 km^{2}) is land and 0.04 square mile (0.1 km^{2}) (0.06%) is water.

== Demographics ==
As of the census of 2000, there were 563 people, 214 households, and 169 families residing in the town. The population density was 15.8 people per square mile (6.1/km^{2}). There were 219 housing units at an average density of 6.1 per square mile (2.4/km^{2}). The racial makeup of the town was 98.22% White, 0.18% African American, 0.18% Native American, 0.18% Pacific Islander, 0.53% from other races, and 0.71% from two or more races. Hispanic or Latino people of any race were 0.71% of the population.

There were 214 households, out of which 32.2% had children under the age of 18 living with them, 70.1% were married couples living together, 4.7% had a female householder with no husband present, and 20.6% were non-families. 16.8% of all households were made up of individuals, and 8.4% had someone living alone who was 65 years of age or older. The average household size was 2.63 and the average family size was 2.93.

In the town, the population was spread out, with 24.2% under the age of 18, 5.5% from 18 to 24, 27.4% from 25 to 44, 29.8% from 45 to 64, and 13.1% who were 65 years of age or older. The median age was 41 years. For every 100 females, there were 101.8 males. For every 100 females age 18 and over, there were 109.3 males.

The median income for a household in the town was $51,250, and the median income for a family was $52,841. Males had a median income of $35,625 versus $31,389 for females. The per capita income for the town was $21,406. About 2.3% of families and 3.2% of the population were below the poverty line, including none of those under age 18 and 5.9% of those age 65 or over.
