= Charles Dunlap (politician) =

American politician

Charles Dunlap was a Republican member of the Wisconsin State Assembly during the 1875 session. Dunlap was a resident of Elkhorn, Wisconsin.
