= Patrick Hobbins =

American politician

Patrick Hobbins (1832 – 1887) was a Democratic member of the Wisconsin State Assembly from 1874 to 1875. He was born on March 17, 1832, in County Tipperary, Ireland and later moved to Holland, Brown County, Wisconsin.
