= Thomas Mohr (politician) =

American politician

Thomas Mohr (April 21, 1831 - May 10, 1907) was an American farmer and politician from Kossuth, Wisconsin, who served two one-year terms (1876-1877) as a member of the Wisconsin State Assembly from Manitowoc County.

== Background ==
Mohr was born in Leuchtenberg in the Kingdom of Bavaria on April 21, 1831, and received a common school education. He came to New York in 1843, ending up in Buffalo, New York, the same year. He became a farmer.

== Coming to Wisconsin ==
Mohr was one of the first white settlers to come to Kossuth, arriving in 1850. Mohr married Maria Hassenfus (also a native of Bavaria) on January 15, 1857, in Manitowoc Rapids. In 1859, he married Margaret Zinkel, and as of 1860 they were living with his son John, at that time two years old (Maria may have died in childbirth). Between 1861 and 1881, they would have nine children of their own: George, Henry, Edward, Theresa, Anna Margareth, Frank, Mary Margaret, Josephine and Michael.

In 1875, Mohr had already served several years as chairman of his town, two terms on the county commission, and two years as town treasurer. While generally a Democrat, Mohr was elected to the second Manitowoc County Assembly district (the Towns of Cato, Cooperstown, Franklin, Gibson, Kossuth, Manitowoc Rapids and Maple Grove) as a member of the Reform Party, a short-lived coalition of Democrats, reform and Liberal Republicans, and Grangers formed in Wisconsin in 1873, which secured the election of a governor and a number of state legislators. He received 632 votes against 562 for Republican R. S. O'Connell. Mohr was assigned to the standing committee on engrossed bills. He was re-elected the next year even though his district had been redistricted, receiving 1,314 votes against 628 for Republican M. Kellner. He was assigned to the committee on town and county organization. He was not a candidate for re-election in 1877, and was succeeded by Democrat William F. Nash.

Mohr had first been elected to the county's board of supervisors from Kossuth in 1873, and would serve on and off in that position through 1901, for a total of eleven years, including two terms (1879 and 1886) as chairman of the board.

== Death ==
Mohr, who had been retired for some time, died on May 10, 1907, in Kossuth, having broken his hip in a fall the previous autumn from which he never fully recovered. He was buried at Calvary Cemetery in Manitowoc. Margaret died August 29, 1907.
