= William Frazier (Wisconsin politician) =

American politician

William Frazier (October 6, 1833 – October 2, 1902) was a member of the Wisconsin State Assembly.

== Biography ==
Frazier was born on October 6, 1833, in Belmont County, Ohio. He married Plume Powell in 1855. They would have eleven children.

== Career ==
Frazier was a member of the Assembly in 1874 as a Republican. Other positions he held include Chairman of the Vernon County, Wisconsin, and of the Jefferson, Vernon County, Wisconsin.
