= Robert L. D. Potter =

American politician (1833–1893)

President pro tempore of the Wisconsin Senate
- In office January 12, 1876 – January 10, 1877
- Preceded by: Henry D. Barron
- Succeeded by: William Hiner

Member of the Wisconsin Senate from the 25th district
- In office January 6, 1873 – January 1, 1877
- Preceded by: Waldo Flint
- Succeeded by: George B. Burrows

District Attorney of Waushara County, Wisconsin
- In office January 7, 1867 – January 2, 1871
- Preceded by: Thomas H. Walker
- Succeeded by: Levi L. Soule
- In office January 7, 1861 – January 5, 1863
- Preceded by: Levi L. Soule
- Succeeded by: R. S. D. Patton

Personal details
- Born: February 5, 1833 Hillsdale, New York, U.S.
- Died: November 2, 1893 (aged 60) Berlin, Wisconsin, U.S.
- Resting place: Wautoma Union Cemetery, Wautoma, Wisconsin
- Party: Republican
- Spouse: Emeline Bingham (m. 1861–1893)
- Children: 7
- Education: Union Law School
- Profession: lawyer

Robert Lewis Dorr Potter (February 5, 1833 – November 2, 1893) was an American lawyer, Republican politician, and Wisconsin pioneer. He served four years as a member of the Wisconsin State Senate, representing Waushara County and central Wisconsin. He is the namesake of the "Potter Law"—a railroad reform law from 1874 which established state regulation of Wisconsin railroads.

== Early life and education ==
Potter was born February 5, 1833, in Hillsdale, New York. At the age of nine, his family moved to Egremont, Massachusetts, where he received most of his primary education. He moved to Easton, Pennsylvania, at about age 20 to work as a tutor in the high school. About two years later, he resigned to attend Union Law School and read law in the offices of Andrew Horatio Reeder. He graduated in 1857 and moved to Wisconsin later that year, settling at Wautoma, in Waushara County.

== Political and legal career ==
In 1860, he was elected district attorney for Waushara County, running on the Republican Party ticket. He was subsequently elected to two more terms as district attorney in 1866 and 1868. While serving as district attorney, in 1867, Potter became the owner and publisher of the Waushara Argus, a Republican partisan newspaper. But he sold out his ownership to the previous owner, W. S. Monroe.

In 1872, Potter was elected to the Wisconsin State Senate, representing Wisconsin's 25th State Senate district—then comprising Marquette, Green Lake, and Waushara counties.

During Potter's first year in the Senate, an economic panic set off calls for reform, resulting in a political upheaval that saw Democrats gain control of the Wisconsin State Assembly and the governor's office for the first time in a generation. During the subsequent 1874 session, Potter worked with his new Democratic colleagues to pass his signature railroad regulation law, titled, An Act relating to railroads, express and telegraph companies, in the state of Wisconsin (1874 Wisc. Act 273). The act came to be commonly known as the "Potter Law". It established regulation of railroad freight and passenger rates and created a new Wisconsin Railroad Commission to oversee the railroad industry in the state.

Railroad companies bitterly resisted the regulation. Two of the largest railroad operators in Wisconsin openly ignored the requirements of the new law, initiating months of litigation. Ultimately, the Potter Law was vindicated in federal court and in the Wisconsin Supreme Court. Politically, however, the railroad companies had more success with the next Governor and Legislature, and successfully lobbied for a significant rollback of the Potter Law's regulations in 1876. The law and court cases, however, did serve as an important precedent in establishing the state's authority to regulate the railroad industry and had a lasting effect on the actual freight and passenger rates charged by the railroads. The Office of Railroad Commissioner still exists in Wisconsin today.

Potter was re-elected to the Senate in 1874, but did not run for a third term in 1876. In March 1876, he was appointed special assistant U.S. attorney general to represent the United States government in a number of lawsuits that had resulted from flooding caused by federal improvements on the Fox and Wisconsin Rivers. He served in that role until May 1878, when he resigned due to poor health.

Politically, he remained active with the Republican Party of Wisconsin and was a long-time member of the Republican State Central Committee. Later in life, he relocated to Berlin, Wisconsin, and engaged in a law practice with his son, known as "Potter & Potter". He also served as mayor of Berlin.

He died of a sudden stroke while standing on his own doorstep on November 2, 1893.

== Personal life and family ==
Robert L. D. Potter married Emeline Bingham at Wautoma on February 5, 1861. They had at least seven children, though three died in infancy. Their eldest son, Sherman, went on to serve sixteen years as county judge of Green Lake County.

== Electoral history ==
=== Wisconsin Senate (1872, 1874) ===
Wisconsin Senate, 25th District Election, 1872
Party	Candidate	Votes	%	±%
General Election, November 5, 1872
Republican	Robert L. D. Potter	3,856	61.76%	
Democratic	Orrin W. Bow	2,388	38.24%	
Plurality		1,468	23.51%	-1.77%
Total votes		6,244	100.0%	+20.75%
Republican hold				

Wisconsin Senate, 25th District Election, 1874
Party	Candidate	Votes	%	±%
General Election, November 3, 1874
Republican	Robert L. D. Potter (incumbent)	3,471	57.50%	−4.25%
Independent	John W. Woodhull	2,565	42.50%	
Plurality		906	15.01%	-8.50%
Total votes		6,036	100.0%	-3.33%
Republican hold				

Wisconsin Senate
Preceded by Waldo Flint	Member of the Wisconsin Senate from the 25th district January 6, 1873 – January 1, 1877	Succeeded by George B. Burrows
Preceded by Henry D. Barron	President pro tempore of the Wisconsin Senate; January 12, 1876 – January 10, 1877	Succeeded by William Hiner
Legal offices
Preceded by Levi L. Soule	District Attorney of Waushara County, Wisconsin; January 7, 1861 – January 5, 1863	Succeeded by R. S. D. Patton
Preceded by Thomas H. Walker	District Attorney of Waushara County, Wisconsin; January 7, 1867 – January 2, 1871	Succeeded by Levi L. Soule
