= William Frazier (Virginia politician) =

American politician (1812–1885)

Member of the Virginia Senate
- In office 1861–1865
- Constituency: Rockbridge, Bath and Highland counties

Member of the Virginia House of Representatives from the Augusta County district
- In office 1842–1843 Serving with Robert S. Brooke
- Succeeded by: James Bell and John G. Fulton

Personal details
- Born: November 19, 1812 Jenning's Gap, Augusta County, Virginia, U.S.
- Died: June 7, 1885 (aged 72) Staunton, Virginia, U.S.
- Resting place: Thornrose Cemetery
- Party: Whig
- Spouse: Sue Massie Lewis (m. 1847)
- Children: 11
- Education: Yale College; University of Virginia (LLB)
- Occupation: Politician; lawyer

William Frazier (November 19, 1812 – June 7, 1885) was a Virginia lawyer and state legislator, who served in both the House of Delegates and the Senate, representing Augusta County.

== Early life ==
William Frazier was born on November 19, 1812, at Jenning's Gap, Augusta County, Virginia, to Martha (née Rankin) and James A. Frazier. His father was an immigrant from County Armagh, Ireland. He attended the classical school of Reverend Dr. Hendren. He left Yale College in August 1830 and entered the University of Virginia, where he pursued academic and legal studies. He graduated in 1834 with a Bachelor of Laws degree and a diploma in medical jurisprudence. In October 1834, he was admitted to the bar in Staunton, Virginia.

== Career ==
In 1834, Frazier settled in Staunton. He was recommended by Professor John A. G. Davis to John Howe Peyton as a pupil for Peyton's law practice and they formed a law partnership. He was a Whig. In 1842, he served as a member of the Virginia State Legislature, representing Augusta County, alongside Robert S. Brooke. In 1843, he was defeated in re-election by James Bell and John G. Fulton. From 1861 to 1865, he was a member of the Virginia State Senate, representing the district of Rockbridge, Bath and Highland counties.

Around 1852, Frazier purchased an interest in Capon Springs House in Capon Springs, West Virginia. After his brother John W. Frazier's death in 1853, he stopped practicing law and left Staunton. He succeeded his brother as manager of the house. Following the Civil War, he moved back to Staunton.

== Personal life ==
Frazier married Sue Massie Lewis, daughter of James A. Lewis, of Charleston, West Virginia, on November 17, 1847. They had 11 children, including Mrs. R. P. Bell, Mrs. W. P. Tams, Mrs. Stuart Baldwin, William, James, Howard T., Edward, Harry and John. He was friends with Henry Clay.

Frazier died on June 7, 1885, at his home in Staunton. He was buried in Thornrose Cemetery.

== Legacy ==
In 1879, Frazier received an honorary Master of Arts from Yale College.
