= Seymour M. Knox =

American politician

Seymour Moses Knox (December 11, 1818 or January 12, 1820 in Russell, New York – December 8, 1901 in Ripon, Wisconsin) was a member of the Wisconsin State Assembly.

== Biography ==
Knox was born in 1818 or 1820 in Russell, New York. He relocated to the Geneva Lake area in Wisconsin in 1845. He later moved to what is now Marquette, Wisconsin. He died in Ripon, Wisconsin.

== Career ==
Knox was president of the Green Lake Agricultural Society in the 1860s. Knox was elected to the Assembly in 1873. He was also chairman of the Town of Green Lake Board. He began his political career as a Democrat, but switched his affiliation to Republican in support of President Lincoln's anti-slavery stance.
