= 1873 Wisconsin gubernatorial election =

- November 4, 1873
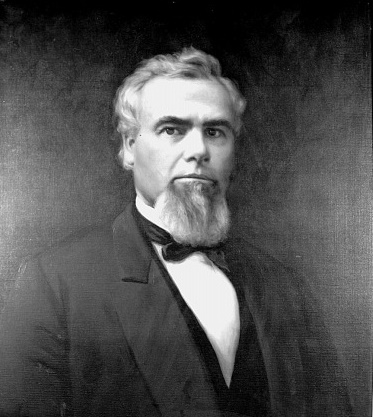

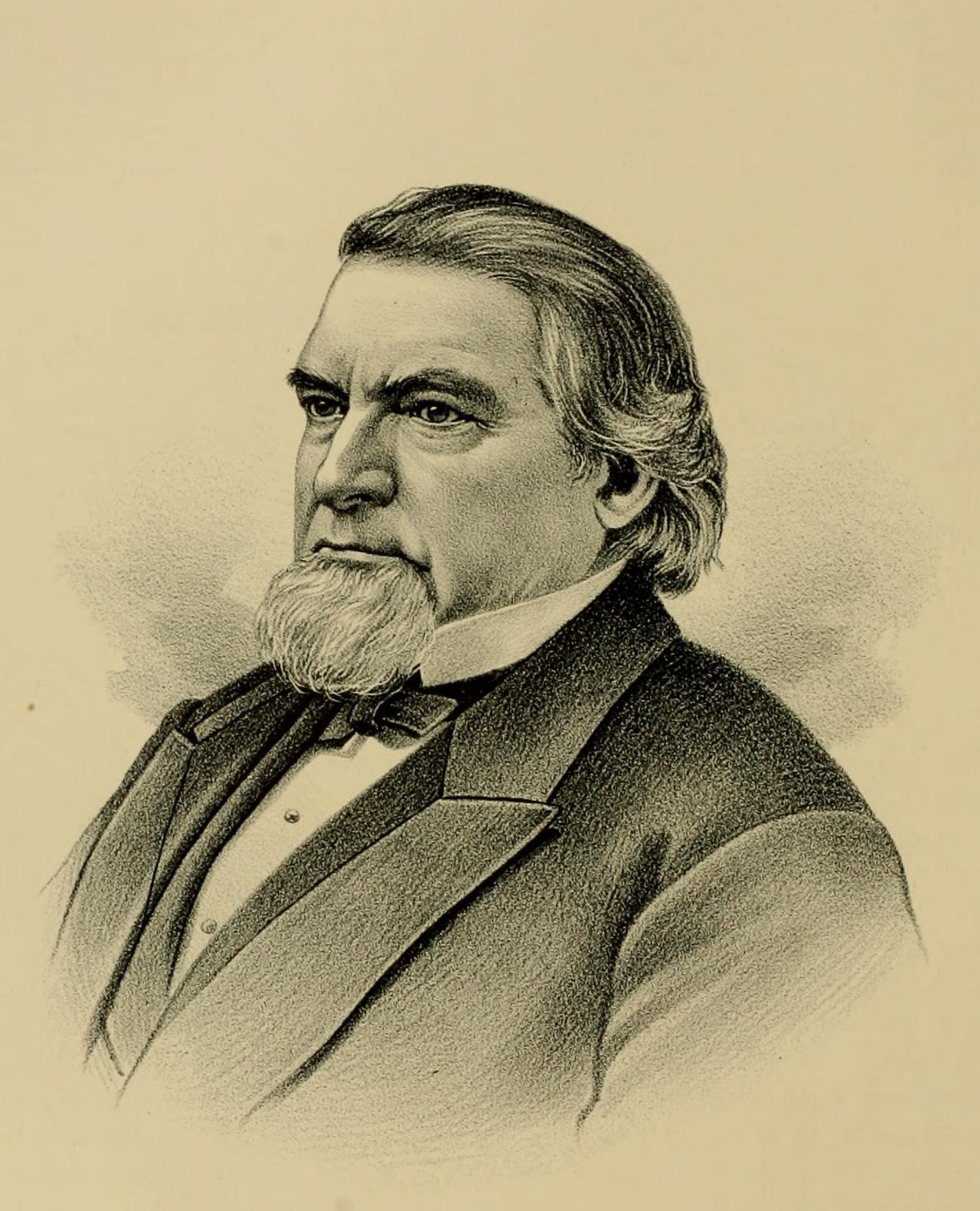
Nominee	William Robert Taylor	Cadwallader C. Washburn
Party	Democratic	Republican
Alliance	Reform	—
Popular vote	81,599	66,224
Percentage	55.19%	44.79%
- County results Taylor : 50–60% 60–70% 70–80% 80–90% Washburn : 50–60% 60–70% 70–80% 80–90% >90%
Governor before election
Cadwallader C. Washburn
Republican
Elected Governor
William Robert Taylor
Democratic

The 1873 Wisconsin gubernatorial election was held on November 4, 1873. Democratic Party candidate William Robert Taylor was elected with 55% of the vote, defeating incumbent Republican governor Cadwallader C. Washburn.

Taylor was the first Democrat elected Governor of Wisconsin since William A. Barstow in 1853. He was nominated as the consensus candidate of the "Reform Party,"—a coalition of Democrats, Liberal Republicans, and Grangers, on a platform of political and economy reform.

== Nominations ==
=== Republican party ===
Cadwallader C. Washburn was the incumbent governor of Wisconsin, having been elected in the 1871 election. Prior to becoming governor, he had served ten years in the United States House of Representatives and had served as a Union Army general in the American Civil War under Ulysses S. Grant.

=== Democratic (Reform) party ===
William Robert Taylor, at the time of the 1873 election, was a Trustee for the State Hospital of the Insane. Previously, he had served as president of the state agriculture society, had been chairman of the Cottage Grove town board, and the Dane County board of supervisors, and had been a member of the Wisconsin State Senate and Assembly.

== Results ==
1873 Wisconsin gubernatorial election
Party	Candidate	Votes	%	±%
Democratic	William R. Taylor	81,599	55.19%	+8.39%
Republican	C. C. Washburn (incumbent)	66,224	44.79%	−8.37%
	Scattering	33	0.02%	
Majority		15,375	10.40%	
Total votes		147,856	100.00%	
Democratic gain from Republican		Swing	+16.77%	

=== Results by county ===
Taylor was the first Democrat to ever win Eau Claire County and Kenosha County. Jackson County and Pierce County voted Democratic for the first time since 1853 and Clark County and Racine County for the first time since 1855. Clark County, Jackson County, and Lafayette County would not vote Democratic again until 1932 while Pierce County would not back a Democrat again until 1960. Adams County and Monroe County failed to back the winner for the first time ever while Columbia County, Portage County, and Sauk County voted for the losing candidate for the first time since 1851.

County	William R. Taylor Democratic		C. C. Washburn Republican		Scattering Write-in		Margin		Total votes cast
County	#	%	#	%	#	%	#	%	Total votes cast
Adams	125	16.28%	642	83.59%	1	0.13%	-517	-67.32%	768
Ashland	265	81.29%	61	18.71%	0	0.00%	204	62.58%	326
Barron	169	32.19%	356	67.81%	0	0.00%	-187	-35.62%	525
Bayfield	12	10.53%	102	89.47%	0	0.00%	-90	-78.95%	114
Brown	2,030	61.03%	1,296	38.97%	0	0.00%	734	22.07%	3,326
Buffalo	1,105	63.36%	639	36.64%	0	0.00%	-466	-26.72%	1,744
Burnett	12	4.63%	247	95.37%	0	0.00%	-235	-90.73%	259
Calumet	1,357	72.68%	508	27.21%	2	0.11%	849	45.47%	1,867
Chippewa	879	59.96%	587	40.04%	0	0.00%	292	19.92%	1,466
Clark	429	54.24%	362	45.76%	0	0.00%	67	8.47%	791
Columbia	1,509	42.99%	2,001	57.01%	0	0.00%	-492	-14.02%	3,510
Crawford	1,112	62.02%	681	37.98%	0	0.00%	431	24.04%	1,793
Dane	4,295	53.29%	3,760	46.65%	5	0.06%	535	6.64%	8,060
Dodge	4,562	71.38%	1,828	28.60%	1	0.02%	2,734	42.78%	6,391
Door	213	28.36%	538	71.64%	0	0.00%	-325	-43.28%	751
Douglas	70	78.65%	19	21.35%	0	0.00%	51	57.30%	89
Dunn	622	47.52%	687	52.48%	0	0.00%	-65	-4.97%	1,309
Eau Claire	1,122	58.04%	810	41.90%	1	0.05%	312	16.14%	1,933
Fond du Lac	3,926	57.23%	2,932	42.74%	2	0.03%	994	14.49%	6,860
Grant	2,104	46.65%	2,405	53.33%	1	0.02%	-301	-6.67%	4,510
Green	1,366	49.35%	1,402	50.65%	0	0.00%	-36	-1.30%	2,768
Green Lake	602	40.19%	896	59.81%	0	0.00%	-294	-19.63%	1,498
Iowa	1,549	53.73%	1,334	46.27%	0	0.00%	215	7.46%	2,883
Jackson	515	51.24%	489	48.66%	1	0.10%	26	2.59%	1,005
Jefferson	2,950	64.40%	1,630	35.58%	1	0.02%	1,320	28.81%	4,581
Juneau	909	45.02%	1,110	54.98%	0	0.00%	-201	-9.96%	2,019
Kenosha	942	52.22%	862	47.78%	0	0.00%	80	4.43%	1,804
Kewaunee	807	81.68%	181	18.32%	0	0.00%	626	63.36%	988
La Crosse	1,458	40.44%	2,147	59.56%	0	0.00%	-689	-19.11%	3,605
Lafayette	1,430	52.50%	1,294	47.50%	0	0.00%	136	4.99%	2,724
Manitowoc	2,715	76.57%	831	23.43%	0	0.00%	1,884	53.13%	3,546
Marathon	779	71.08%	317	28.92%	0	0.00%	462	42.15%	1,096
Marquette	739	68.17%	345	31.83%	0	0.00%	394	36.35%	1,084
Milwaukee	10,435	78.61%	2,837	21.37%	3	0.02%	7,598	57.24%	13,275
Monroe	1,134	47.23%	1,267	52.77%	0	0.00%	-133	-5.54%	2,401
Oconto	790	52.67%	710	47.33%	0	0.00%	80	5.33%	1,500
Outagamie	2,092	66.99%	1,031	33.01%	0	0.00%	1,061	33.97%	3,123
Ozaukee	1,839	88.63%	235	11.33%	1	0.05%	1,604	77.30%	2,075
Pepin	303	41.28%	431	58.72%	0	0.00%	-128	-17.44%	734
Pierce	741	51.82%	687	48.04%	2	0.14%	54	3.78%	1,430
Polk	223	29.77%	524	69.96%	2	0.27%	-301	-40.19%	749
Portage	549	34.46%	1,044	65.54%	0	0.00%	-495	-31.07%	1,593
Racine	2,138	53.10%	1,888	46.90%	0	0.00%	250	6.21%	4,026
Richland	1,066	48.15%	1,148	51.85%	0	0.00%	-82	-3.70%	2,214
Rock	1,279	27.61%	3,347	72.24%	7	0.15%	-2,068	-44.64%	4,633
Sauk	1,115	41.82%	1,550	58.14%	1	0.04%	-435	-16.32%	2,666
Shawano	415	67.59%	198	32.25%	1	0.16%	217	35.34%	614
Sheboygan	2,480	63.12%	1,449	36.88%	0	0.00%	1,031	26.24%	3,929
St. Croix	1,151	52.94%	1,023	47.06%	0	0.00%	128	5.89%	2,174
Trempealeau	339	26.86%	923	73.14%	0	0.00%	-584	-46.28%	1,262
Vernon	547	24.28%	1,706	75.72%	0	0.00%	-1,159	-51.44%	2,253
Walworth	1,075	30.22%	2,482	69.78%	0	0.00%	-1,407	-39.56%	3,557
Washington	2,334	83.45%	463	16.55%	0	0.00%	1,871	66.89%	2,797
Waukesha	2,641	55.87%	2,086	44.13%	0	0.00%	555	11.74%	4,727
Waupaca	902	36.91%	1,542	63.09%	0	0.00%	-640	-26.19%	2,444
Waushara	413	24.54%	1,270	75.46%	0	0.00%	-857	-50.92%	1,683
Winnebago	2,591	47.54%	2,858	52.44%	1	0.02%	-267	-4.90%	5,450
Wood	328	59.21%	226	40.79%	0	0.00%	102	18.41%	554
Total	81,599	55.19%	66,224	44.79%	33	0.02%	15,375	10.40%	147,856

==== Counties that flipped from Republican to Democratic ====
- Ashland
- Buffalo
- Clark
- Dane
- Eau Claire
- Jackson
- Kenosha
- Lafayette
- Oconto
- Pierce
- Racine
- St. Croix
- Wood
