= James E. Newell =

American politician

James E. Newell was an American politician. He was a member of the Wisconsin State Assembly.

== Biography ==
Newell was born on March 6, 1808, in Richland Township, Belmont County, Ohio. He moved to Viroqua (town), Wisconsin, in 1854. During the American Civil War, Newell was a member of the 50th Wisconsin Volunteer Infantry Regiment of the Union Army. He was a first lieutenant.

== Political career ==
Newell was a member of the Assembly during the 1875 session. Other positions he held include District Attorney and County Judge of Vernon County, Wisconsin. He was a Republican.
