= Robert C. Field =

American politician and businessman

Robert C. Field (May 6, 1804 – June 16, 1876) was an American politician and businessman.

Born in Cairo, New York, he studied law for a few years while in New York. He served in the New York State Assembly from Greene County, New York in 1844. In 1849, he moved to Richland County, Wisconsin and served in the Wisconsin State Assembly in 1859. He moved to Trempealeau County, Wisconsin and served in the Wisconsin State Senate 1874–1875. He also served in the Trempealeau County Board of Supervisors and was in the mercantile business. He died in Osseo, Wisconsin.
