= Frank A. Leach (politician) =

American businessman and politician

Franklin A. Leach (February 7, 1826 – May 22, 1893) was an American businessman and politician.

Born in Pamelia, Jefferson County, New York, Leach moved with his parents to Watertown, Wisconsin Territory in 1845. Leach lived on a farm in the town of Utica, Winnebago County, Wisconsin. He was involved with the grocery, dry goods, and hardware businesses in Oshkosh, Wisconsin. Leach served on the Utica Town Board, the Oshkosh Common Council, and was a Republican. In 1874 and 1875, Leach served in the Wisconsin State Assembly. Leach died at his home in Oshkosh, Wisconsin from kidney problems.
