= William Robert Taylor =

19th century American Democratic politician, 12th Governor of Wisconsin

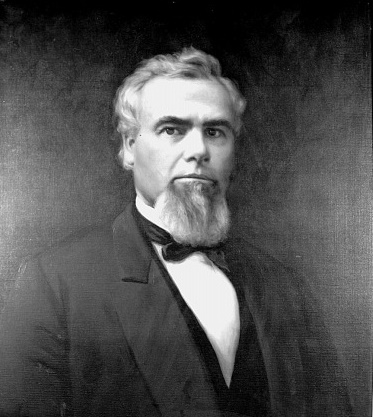

12th Governor of Wisconsin
- In office January 5, 1874 – January 3, 1876
- Lieutenant: Charles D. Parker
- Preceded by: Cadwallader C. Washburn
- Succeeded by: Harrison Ludington

Member of the Wisconsin Senate from the 11th district
- In office January 12, 1859 – January 9, 1861
- Preceded by: Hiram Giles
- Succeeded by: Samuel C. Bean

Member of the Wisconsin State Assembly from the Dane 2nd district
- In office January 10, 1855 – January 9, 1856
- Preceded by: Samuel H. Baker
- Succeeded by: Augustus A. Huntington

Personal details
- Born: July 10, 1820 Woodbury, Connecticut, US
- Died: March 17, 1909 (aged 88) Burke, Wisconsin, US
- Resting place: Forest Hill Cemetery; Madison, Wisconsin
- Party: Democratic
- Spouses: Catherine Hurd; (m. 1842; died); Viola Lee; (m. 1886; died 1932)
- Children: 4
- Profession: Teacher; Farmer; Lumberman; Politician

William Robert Taylor (July 10, 1820 – March 17, 1909) was an American politician and the 12th governor of Wisconsin from 1874 to 1876.

== Early life ==
Taylor was born in Woodbury, Connecticut. He was orphaned at age 6 when his father's ship was lost at sea; his mother had died when he was an infant. Cared for by his neighbors, he then moved with his guardians to Jefferson County, New York.

== Career ==
Taylor moved to Ohio, where he taught school, studied medicine, and served in the local militia. He served as president of the Dane County Agricultural Society and the State Agricultural Society after he moved, in 1848, to a farm in Cottage Grove, Wisconsin. There he was involved with lumbering as well as farming. He was a member of both the Wisconsin State Assembly, in 1855, and the Wisconsin State Senate, in 1859 and 1860. He was chairman of the city and served as a member of the Dane County Board, County Superintendent of Schools, and County Superintendent of the Poor. He was trustee of the State Hospital for the Insane in Mendota from 1860 to 1874.

Although he was a Democrat, he supported the North during the American Civil War and was elected to one term as Wisconsin's governor at the head of the "Reform" or "People's Reform" Party, a short-lived coalition of Democrats, reform and Liberal Republicans, and Grangers. He served as governor from January 5, 1874, to January 3, 1876, paying for his own inauguration and refusing free railroad passes and telegrams.

=== Governorship ===
During his time as Governor, Taylor had the privilege of appointing the 3rd Chief Justice of the Wisconsin Supreme Court, Edward George Ryan.

The most noteworthy act of Taylor's governorship, however, was likely the so-called "Potter Law,"—named for Republican state senator Robert L. D. Potter—officially, 1874 Wisconsin Act 273. The law was a major priority of the Granger movement and effectively put railroad and freight prices under the control of a new state Railroad Commission. The law was aggressively challenged in the courts by the railroad companies, with cases even reaching the Supreme Court of the United States. The law survived legal challenge, however, Governor Taylor was defeated for re-election in 1875. His successor, Harrison Ludington, signed a bill to repeal the Potter Law and replace it with a weaker law establishing a weaker regulatory body.

== Death ==
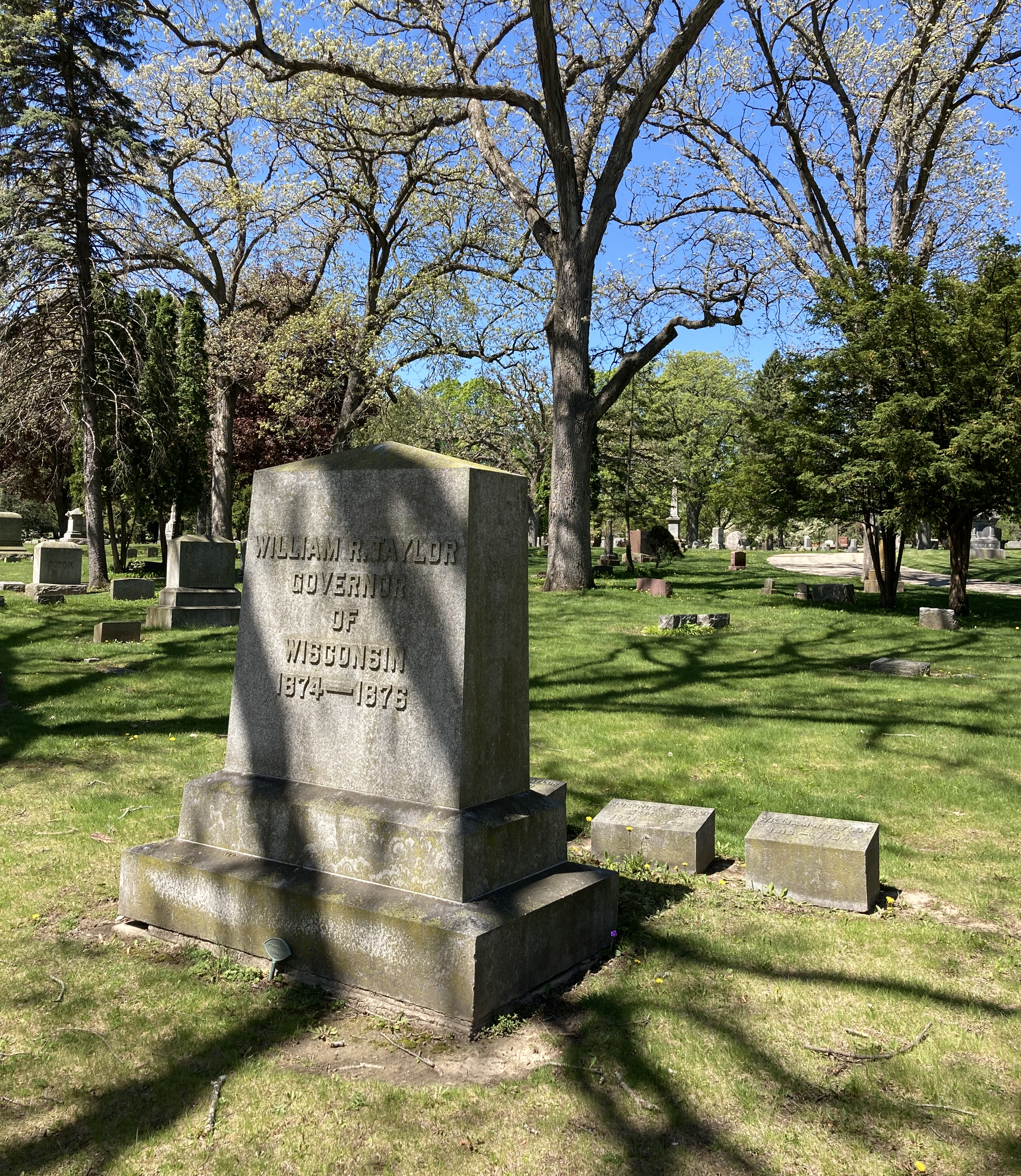
Taylor's grave at Forest Hill Cemetery

Impoverished, Taylor died in the Gisholt Home for the Aged in Burke, Wisconsin, on March 17, 1909 (age 88 years, 250 days). He is interred at Forest Hill Cemetery, Madison, Wisconsin. Taylor County, Wisconsin, is named for him.

== Family life ==
Son of Robert and Mary (Coleman) Taylor, he was orphaned at age six when his father was lost at sea, and was cared for by neighbors. He married Catherine Hurd in 1842 and they had three children; and he married Viola Lee in 1886 and they had one son.

Party political offices
Preceded by James Rood Doolittle	Democratic nominee for Governor of Wisconsin; 1873, 1875	Succeeded by James A. Mallory
Political offices
Preceded by Cadwallader C. Washburn	Governor of Wisconsin; 1874 – 1876	Succeeded by Harrison Ludington
