= 18th Wisconsin Legislature =

Wisconsin legislative term for 1865

←	17th	19th	→
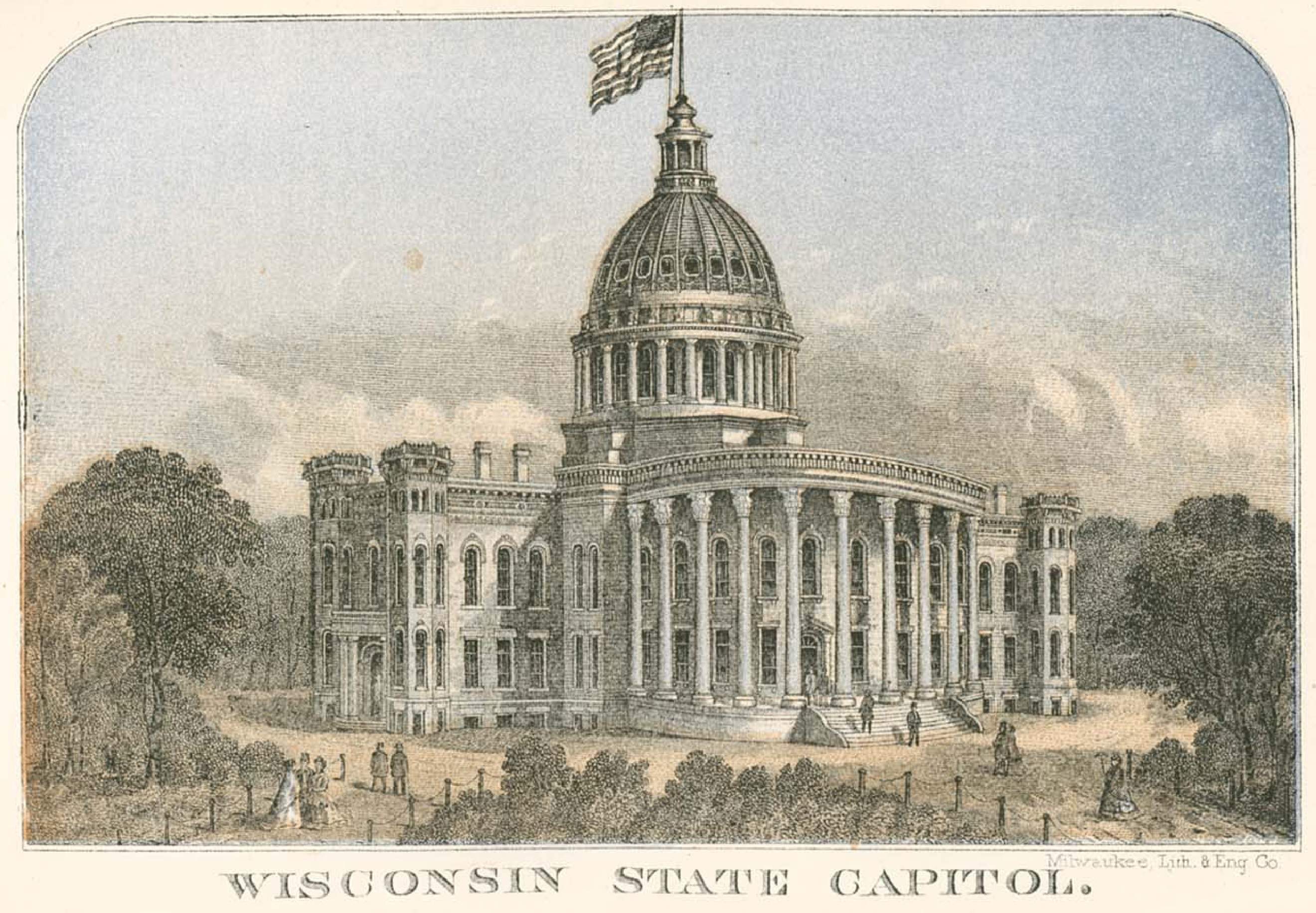
- Wisconsin State Capitol, 1863

Overview
- Legislative body: Wisconsin Legislature
- Meeting place: Wisconsin State Capitol
- Term: January 2, 1865 – January 1, 1866
- Election: November 8, 1864

Senate
- Members: 33
- Senate President: Wyman Spooner (U)
- President pro tempore: Willard H. Chandler (U)
- Party control: National Union

Assembly
- Members: 100
- Assembly Speaker: William W. Field (U)
- Party control: National Union

Sessions
- 1st: January 11, 1865 – April 10, 1865

The Eighteenth Wisconsin Legislature convened from January 11, 1865, to April 10, 1865, in regular session.

Senators representing even-numbered districts were newly elected for this session and were serving the first year of a two-year term. Assembly members were elected to a one-year term. Assembly members and even-numbered senators were elected in the general election of November 8, 1864. Senators representing odd-numbered districts were serving the second year of their two-year term, having been elected in the general election held on November 3, 1863.

The governor of Wisconsin during this entire term was Republican James T. Lewis, of Columbia County, serving the second year of a two-year term, having won election in the 1863 Wisconsin gubernatorial election.

== Major events ==
- January 31, 1865: The United States House of Representatives passed the Thirteenth Amendment to the United States Constitution, banning slavery in the United States.
- March 4, 1865: Second inauguration of President Abraham Lincoln.
- April 3, 1865: Union Army forces occupied the Confederate capital city Richmond, Virginia, after a months-long siege.
- April 9, 1865: Confederate General Robert E. Lee surrendered the Army of Northern Virginia to General Ulysses S. Grant at Appomattox Court House, Virginia.
- April 14, 1865: President Abraham Lincoln was assassinated in Washington, D.C.
- April 15, 1865: Vice President Andrew Johnson was sworn in as the 17th President of the United States.
- May 10, 1865: Confederate States President Jefferson Davis was captured by the 4th Michigan Cavalry Regiment in Irwin County, Georgia, effectively ending the American Civil War.
- November 7, 1865: Lucius Fairchild elected Governor of Wisconsin.
- December 6, 1865: Thirteenth Amendment to the United States Constitution was ratified by the required three-fourths of U.S. states.

== Major legislation ==
- February 7, 1865: Act to incorporate the Wisconsin soldiers' home, 1865 Act 16
- February 24, 1865: Joint Resolution ratifying proposed amendment to the Constitution of the United States, 1865 Joint Resolution 5

== Party summary ==
=== Senate summary ===
Senate partisan composition Democratic: 8 seats National Union: 25 seats

	Party (Shading indicates majority caucus)			Total	
	Democratic	Union	Republican	Total	Vacant
End of previous Legislature	11	22	0	33	0
1st Session	8	25	0	33	0
Final voting share	24.24%	75.76%			
Beginning of the next Legislature	10	23	0	33	0

=== Assembly summary ===
Assembly partisan composition Democratic: 33 seats National Union: 67 seats

	Party (Shading indicates majority caucus)			Total	
	Democratic	Union	Republican	Total	Vacant
End of previous Legislature	29	71	0	100	0
Start of 1st Session	34	66	0	100	0
From January 19	33	66	0	99	1
From February 20	33	67	0	100	0
Final voting share	33%	67%			
Beginning of the next Legislature	34	66	0	100	0

== Sessions ==
- 1st Regular session: January 11, 1865 – April 10, 1865

== Leaders ==
=== Senate leadership ===
- President of the Senate: Wyman Spooner
- President pro tempore: Willard H. Chandler

=== Assembly leadership ===
- Speaker of the Assembly: William W. Field

== Members ==
=== Members of the Senate ===
Members of the Wisconsin Senate for the Eighteenth Wisconsin Legislature:

Senate partisan representation Democratic: 8 seats Union: 25 seats

District	Counties	Senator	Residence	Party
01	Sheboygan	John A. Bentley	Sheboygan	Union
02	Brown, Kewaunee	Frederick S. Ellis	Green Bay	Dem.
03	Ozaukee	Lyman Morgan	Ozaukee	Dem.
04	Washington	Frederick O. Thorpe	West Bend	Dem.
05	Milwaukee (Northern Part)	William K. Wilson	Milwaukee	Dem.
06	Milwaukee (Southern Part)	Hugh P. Reynolds	Milwaukee	Dem.
07	Racine	Jerome I. Case	Racine	Union
08	Kenosha	Anthony Van Wyck	Kenosha	Union
09	Adams, Juneau, Waushara	Henry G. Webb	Wautoma	Union
10	Waukesha	William Blair	Waukesha	Union
11	Dane (Eastern Part)	Willard H. Chandler	Windsor	Union
12	Walworth	Newton Littlejohn	Whitewater	Union
13	Lafayette	Samuel Cole	Gratiot	Union
14	Sauk	Smith S. Wilkinson	Prairie du Sac	Union
15	Iowa	Wyman Lincoln	Avoca	Union
16	Grant	Milas K. Young	Glen Haven	Union
17	Rock	William A. Lawrence	Janesville	Union
18	Dodge (Western Part)	William E. Smith	Fox Lake	Union
19	Manitowoc, Calumet	George B. Reed	Manitowoc	Dem.
20	Fond du Lac	George F. Wheeler	Nanaupa	Union
21	Winnebago	George S. Barnum	Waukau	Union
22	Door, Oconto, Outagamie, Shawanaw	Joseph Harris	Sturgeon Bay	Union
23	Jefferson	S. W. Budlong	Waterloo	Dem.
24	Green	Walter S. Wescott	Monroe	Union
25	Columbia	Jonathan Bowman	Monroe	Union
26	Dane (Western Part)	Thomas Hood	Madison	Union
27	Marathon, Portage, Waupaca, Wood	Milan H. Sessions	Waupaca	Union
28	Ashland, Burnett, Dallas, Douglas, La Pointe, Pierce, Polk, St. Croix	Austin H. Young	Prescott	Union
29	Marquette, Green Lake	G. DeWitt Elwood	Princeton	Union
30	Bad Ax, Crawford, Richland	William Ketcham	Richland City	Union
31	La Crosse, Monroe	John A. Chandler	Sparta	Union
32	Buffalo, Chippewa, Clark, Dunn, Eau Claire, Jackson, Pepin, Trempealeau	Carl C. Pope	Black River Falls	Union
33	Dodge (Eastern Part)	Satterlee Clark	Horicon	Dem.

=== Members of the Assembly ===
Members of the Assembly for the Eighteenth Wisconsin Legislature:

Assembly partisan representation Democratic: 33 seats Union: 67 seats

Senate District	County	District	Representative	Party	Residence
09	Adams		Revel K. Fay	Union	Roche a Cri
28	Ashland, Burnett, Dallas, Douglas, La Pointe, Polk		Amos S. Gray (until Jan. 19)	Dem.	Osceola
28	Ashland, Burnett, Dallas, Douglas, La Pointe, Polk		Albert C. Stuntz (from Jan. 19)	Union	Bayfield
02	Brown		William J. Abrams	Dem.	Green Bay
32	Buffalo, Pepin, Trempealeau		John Burgess	Union	Maxville
19	Calumet		Hector McLean	Dem.	Stockbridge
32	Chippewa, Dunn, Eau Claire		Francis R. Church	Union	Menomonie
32	Clark, Jackson		Richard Dewhurst	Union	Neillsville
25	Columbia	1	Levi W. Barden	Union	Portage
25	Columbia	2	Jesse F. Hand	Union	Rocky Run
25	Columbia	3	William Owen	Union	Cambria
30	Crawford		Ormsby B. Thomas	Union	Prairie du Chien
11	Dane	1	William M. Colladay	Union	Stoughton
11	Dane	2	Abram A. Boyce	Union	Lodi
26	Dane	3	David Ford	Dem.	Leicester
26	Dane	4	John S. Frary	Union	Oregon
26	Dane	5	James Ross	Union	Madison
18	Dodge	1	James M. McGuire (died Jan. 19)	Union	Danville
18	Dodge	1	Stoddard Judd (from Feb. 20)	Union	Fox Lake
18	Dodge	2	Michael F. Lowth	Dem.	Beaver Dam
18	Dodge	3	Oscar F. Jones	Dem.	Juneau
33	Dodge	4	Peter Peters	Dem.	Rubicon
33	Dodge	5	Ferdinand Gnewuch	Dem.	Hustisford
22	Door, Oconto, Shawano		Dennis A. Reed	Union	Sturgeon Bay
20	Fond du Lac	1	D. C. Van Ostrand	Union	Ripon
20	Fond du Lac	2	John H. Brinkerhoff	Union	Waupun
20	Fond du Lac	3	James Sawyer	Union	Fond du Lac
20	Fond du Lac	4	Thomas Boyd	Dem.	Calumet
20	Fond du Lac	5	Jonathan Large	Dem.	Oakfield
16	Grant	1	William Brandon	Union	Smelser's Grove
16	Grant	2	Allen Taylor	Union	Dickeyville
16	Grant	3	Henry Utt	Union	Platteville
16	Grant	4	William W. Field	Union	Boscobel
16	Grant	5	Robert Glenn	Union	Wyalusing
24	Green	1	William W. McLaughlin	Union	Brooklyn
24	Green	2	David Dunwiddie	Union	Brodhead
29	Green Lake		Lorentus J. Brayton	Union	Marquette
15	Iowa	1	Elihu Goodsell	Dem.	Highland
15	Iowa	2	Francis Little	Union	Mineral Point
23	Jefferson	1	Jonathan Piper	Dem.	Ixonia
23	Jefferson	2	Gardner Spoor	Union	Aztalan
23	Jefferson	3	Alanson Pike	Union	Whitewater
23	Jefferson	4	William P. Forsyth	Union	Golden Lake
09	Juneau		Eliphalet S. Miner	Union	Necedah
08	Kenosha		Zalmon G. Simmons	Union	Kenosha
02	Kewaunee		Lyman Walker	Dem.	Kewaunee
31	La Crosse		Townsend N. Horton	Union	West Salem
13	Lafayette	1	James Harker	Dem.	New Diggings
13	Lafayette	2	Sylvester W. Osborn	Union	Darlington
19	Manitowoc	1	Henry Mulholland	Dem.	Meeme
19	Manitowoc	2	Michael Murphy	Dem.	Maple Grove
19	Manitowoc	3	Charles B. Daggart	Dem.	Two Rivers
27	Marathon & Wood		H. W. Remington (until Jan. 19)	Dem.	Grand Rapids
27	Marathon & Wood		M. J. McRaith (from Jan. 19)	Dem.	Grand Rapids
29	Marquette		Spencer A. Pease	Dem.	Montello
05	Milwaukee	1	Jackson Hadley	Dem.	Milwaukee
05	Milwaukee	2	David Knab	Dem.	Milwaukee
06	Milwaukee	3	James McGrath	Dem.	Milwaukee
06	Milwaukee	4	DeWitt Davis	Union	Milwaukee
06	Milwaukee	5	Jared Thompson Jr.	Dem.	Milwaukee
05	Milwaukee	6	Jacob Obermann	Dem.	Milwaukee
05	Milwaukee	7	Henry Fowler	Dem.	Milwaukee
06	Milwaukee	8	John W. Weiler	Dem.	Root Creek
06	Milwaukee	9	Richard White	Dem.	Lamberton
31	Monroe		Josiah M. Tarr	Union	Tunnel City
22	Outagamie		Samuel Ryan Jr.	Dem.	Appleton
03	Ozaukee		William T. Bonniwell Jr.	Dem.	Cedarburg
28	Pierce & St. Croix		Marcus Fulton	Union	Hudson
27	Portage		Newton H. Emmons	Union	Stevens Point
07	Racine	1	John Vaughan	Union	Racine
07	Racine	2	Elijah C. Salisbury	Union	Union Grove
07	Racine	3	Frederick A. Weage	Union	Waterford
30	Richland		Henry L. Eaton	Union	Lone Rock
17	Rock	1	Daniel Johnson	Union	Evansville
17	Rock	2	Solomon C. Carr	Union	West Milton
17	Rock	3	Henry S. Wooster	Union	Clinton
17	Rock	4	Edward P. King	Union	Beloit
17	Rock	5	John B. Cassoday	Union	Janesville
17	Rock	6	Daniel Mowe	Union	Orfordville
14	Sauk	1	William Palmer	Union	Logansville
14	Sauk	2	Argalus W. Starks	Union	Baraboo
01	Sheboygan	1	Joseph Wedig	Dem.	Sheboygan
01	Sheboygan	2	Cephas Whipple	Union	Sheboygan Falls
01	Sheboygan	3	Charles Rogers	Union	Hingham
01	Sheboygan	4	Edwin Slade	Union	Glenbeulah
30	Vernon	1	William H. Officer	Union	Springville
30	Vernon	2	James Berry	Union	Springville
12	Walworth	1	Hezekiah C. Tilton	Union	Allen's Grove
12	Walworth	2	Thomas Davis	Union	Millard
12	Walworth	3	Benjamin F. Groesbeck	Union	Tirade
12	Walworth	4	Horatio S. Winsor	Union	Elkhorn
04	Washington	1	George C. Williams	Dem.	Hartford
04	Washington	2	Mitchell L. Delaney	Dem.	Barton
04	Washington	3	Ernst Franckenberg	Dem.	Newburg
10	Waukesha	1	Thomas Weaver	Dem.	Pewaukee
10	Waukesha	2	John N. Cadby	Union	Merton
10	Waukesha	3	John B. Monteith	Union	Genesee
10	Waukesha	4	Myron Gilbert	Union	Prospect Hill
27	Waupaca		Reuben G. Doud	Union	Weyauwega
09	Waushara		Oscar Babcock	Union	Dacotah
21	Winnebago	1	William A. Knapp	Union	Oshkosh
21	Winnebago	2	Nathan Cobb	Union	Neenah
21	Winnebago	3	William Simmons	Union	Nekimi

== Employees ==
=== Senate employees ===
- Chief Clerk: Frank M. Stewart
  - Assistant Clerk: L. B. Hills
    - Bookkeeper: S. Hauxhurst
  - Engrossing Clerk: O. F. Clapp
  - Enrolling Clerk: Thomas Marshall
  - Transcribing Clerk: H. Harvey
- Sergeant-at-Arms: Nelson Williams
  - 1st Assistant Sergeant-at-Arms: James L. Wilder
  - 2nd Assistant Sergeant-at-Arms: D. W. C. Wilson
  - Sergeant-at-Arms' Porter: Thomas Goss
- Postmaster: Frank Leland
  - Assistant Postmaster: W. S. Williams
- Doorkeeper: J. P. Miller
  - Assistant Doorkeeper: George D. Potter
  - Assistant Doorkeeper: S. J. Abbott
  - Assistant Doorkeeper: Eames Wadsworth
  - Assistant Doorkeeper: Norman McBeath
  - Assistant Doorkeeper: August Wandrey
- Firemen:
  - James Yates
  - Roswell Stow
  - Fireman and Porter: William Holden
- Messengers:
  - Jonathan C. Hutchins
  - Rufus H. Roys
  - C. C. Frey
  - Thomas Goss
  - Seymour Stoughton

=== Assembly employees ===
- Chief Clerk: John S. Dean
  - Assistant Clerk: Ephraim W. Young
    - Bookkeeper: William M. Newcomb
  - Engrossing Clerk: L. R. Davis
  - Enrolling Clerk: J. H. Balch
  - Transcribing Clerk: R. H. Blodgett
- Sergeant-at-Arms: Alonzo Wilcox
  - 1st Assistant Sergeant-at-Arms: Lewis M. Hammond
  - 2nd Assistant Sergeant-at-Arms: E. H. Bartholt
- Postmaster: Hiram Morley
  - 1st Assistant Postmaster: Hiram Beckwith
  - 2nd Assistant Postmaster: R. Law
- Doorkeepers:
  - S. Raymond
  - M. Colby
  - H. H. Helms
  - George D. Phinney
- Firemen:
  - E. E. Brown
  - John Grant
  - F. K. Melvin
  - Nelson Bowerman
  - William Fitzpatrick
  - G. A. Foss
- Speaker's Messenger: William P. Beach
- Chief Clerk's Messenger: James E. Dean
- Sergeant-at-Arms' Messenger: Louis Sholes
- Gallery Attendant: S. Nye Jr.
- Messengers:
  - George F. Williston
  - Frederic A. Frank
  - Howard W. Tilton
  - Linus S. Webb
  - Alfred F. Bishop
  - Frank Mason
  - Harvey Olin
  - Nicholas F. Weber
  - John S. Young
  - Richard C. Notbohm
