= 19th Wisconsin Legislature =

Wisconsin legislative term for 1866

←	18th	20th	→
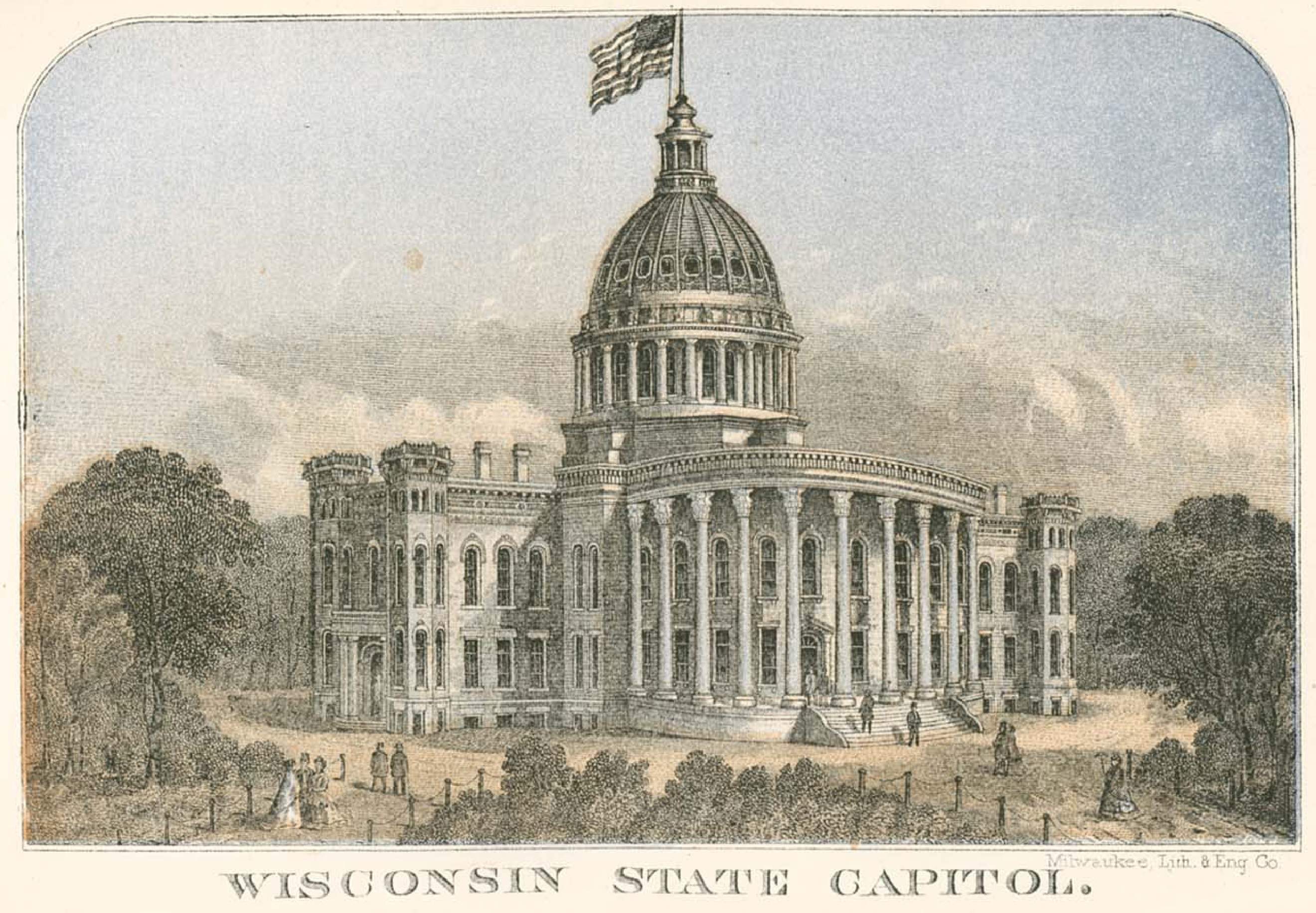
- Wisconsin State Capitol, 1863

Overview
- Legislative body: Wisconsin Legislature
- Meeting place: Wisconsin State Capitol
- Term: January 1, 1866 – January 7, 1867
- Election: November 7, 1865

Senate
- Members: 33
- Senate President: Wyman Spooner (U)
- President pro tempore: Willard H. Chandler (U)
- Party control: National Union

Assembly
- Members: 100
- Assembly Speaker: Henry D. Barron (U)
- Party control: National Union

Sessions
- 1st: January 10, 1866 – April 12, 1866

The Nineteenth Wisconsin Legislature convened from January 10, 1866, to April 12, 1866, in regular session.

Senators representing even-numbered districts were newly elected for this session and were serving the first year of a two-year term. Assembly members were elected to a one-year term. Assembly members and even-numbered senators were elected in the general election of November 7, 1865. Senators representing odd-numbered districts were serving the second year of their two-year term, having been elected in the general election held on November 8, 1864.

The governor of Wisconsin during this entire term was Republican Lucius Fairchild, of Dane County, serving the first year of a two-year term, having won election in the 1865 Wisconsin gubernatorial election.

== Major events ==
- January 1, 1866: Inauguration of Lucius Fairchild as the 10th Governor of Wisconsin.
- April 9, 1866: Congress overrode the veto of President Andrew Johnson to pass the Civil Rights Act of 1866.
- July 24, 1866: Tennessee became the first state readmitted to the Union after the American Civil War.
- August 23, 1866: The Treaty of Prague ended the Austro-Prussian War, establishing Prussian hegemony over the German states of central Europe.
- October 12, 1866: The Treaty of Vienna ended the Third Italian War of Independence, with the Austrian Empire conceding the region of Venetia.

== Major legislation ==
- April 21, 1866: Act to apportion the state into Senate and Assembly districts, 1866 Act 101

== Party summary ==
=== Senate summary ===
Senate partisan composition Democratic: 10 seats National Union: 23 seats

	Party (Shading indicates majority caucus)			Total	
	Democratic	Union	Republican	Total	Vacant
End of previous Legislature	8	25	0	33	0
1st Session	10	23	0	33	0
Final voting share	30.3%	69.7%			
Beginning of the next Legislature	11	22	0	33	0

=== Assembly summary ===
Assembly partisan composition Democratic: 33 seats National Union: 67 seats

	Party (Shading indicates majority caucus)			Total	
	Democratic	Union	Republican	Total	Vacant
End of previous Legislature	33	67	0	100	0
Start of 1st Session	34	66	0	100	0
From January 30	33	67	0	100	0
Final voting share	33%	67%			
Beginning of the next Legislature	26	74	0	100	0

== Sessions ==
- 1st Regular session: January 10, 1866 – April 12, 1866

== Leaders ==
=== Senate leadership ===
- President of the Senate: Wyman Spooner
- President pro tempore: Willard H. Chandler

=== Assembly leadership ===
- Speaker of the Assembly: Henry D. Barron

== Members ==
=== Members of the Senate ===
Members of the Wisconsin Senate for the Nineteenth Wisconsin Legislature:

Senate partisan representation Democratic: 10 seats Union: 23 seats

Dist.	Counties	Senator	Residence	Party
1	Sheboygan	John A. Bentley	Sheboygan	Union
2	Brown, Kewaunee	Matthew J. Meade	Green Bay	Dem.
3	Ozaukee	Lyman Morgan	Ozaukee	Dem.
4	Washington	Frederick O. Thorpe	West Bend	Dem.
5	Milwaukee (Northern Part)	William K. Wilson	Milwaukee	Dem.
6	Milwaukee (Southern Part)	Charles H. Larkin	Milwaukee	Dem.
7	Racine	Jerome I. Case	Racine	Union
8	Kenosha	Charles C. Sholes	Kenosha	Union
9	Adams, Juneau, Waushara	Henry G. Webb	Wautoma	Union
10	Waukesha	Orson Reed	Summit	Dem.
11	Dane (Eastern Part)	Willard H. Chandler	Windsor	Union
12	Walworth	Newton Littlejohn	Whitewater	Union
13	Lafayette	Samuel Cole	Gratiot	Union
14	Sauk	Argalus Starks	Baraboo	Union
15	Iowa	Wyman Lincoln	Avoca	Union
16	Grant	John H. Rountree	Platteville	Union
17	Rock	William A. Lawrence	Janesville	Union
18	Dodge (Western Part)	Stoddard Judd	Fox Lake	Union
19	Manitowoc, Calumet	George B. Reed	Manitowoc	Dem.
20	Fond du Lac	George F. Wheeler	Nanaupa	Union
21	Winnebago	George S. Barnum	Waukau	Union
22	Door, Oconto, Outagamie, Shawanaw	Augustus L. Smith	Appleton	Dem.
23	Jefferson	S. W. Budlong	Waterloo	Dem.
24	Green	Henry Adams	Monticello	Union
25	Columbia	Jonathan Bowman	Kilbourn City	Union
26	Dane (Western Part)	James K. Proudfit	Madison	Union
27	Marathon, Portage, Waupaca, Wood	Milan H. Sessions	Waupaca	Union
28	Ashland, Burnett, Dallas, Douglas, La Pointe, Pierce, Polk, St. Croix	Marcus A. Fulton	Hudson	Union
29	Marquette, Green Lake	G. DeWitt Elwood	Princeton	Union
30	Bad Ax, Crawford, Richland	Benjamin Bull	Prairie du Chien	Union
31	La Crosse, Monroe	John A. Chandler	Sparta	Union
32	Buffalo, Chippewa, Clark, Dunn, Eau Claire, Jackson, Pepin, Trempealeau	Joseph G. Thorp	Eau Claire	Union
33	Dodge (Eastern Part)	Satterlee Clark	Horicon	Dem.

=== Members of the Assembly ===
Members of the Assembly for the Nineteenth Wisconsin Legislature:

Assembly partisan representation Democratic: 33 seats Union: 67 seats

Senate District	County	Dist.	Representative	Party	Residence
09	Adams		Thomas B. Marsden	Union	Friendship
28	Ashland, Burnett, Dallas, Douglas, La Pointe, Polk		Henry D. Barron	Union	St. Croix Falls
02	Brown		William J. Abrams	Dem.	Green Bay
32	Buffalo, Pepin, Trempealeau		William H. Thomas	Union	Sumner
19	Calumet		George Baldwin	Dem.	Chilton
32	Chippewa, Dunn, Eau Claire		Thaddeus C. Pound	Union	Chippewa Falls
32	Clark, Jackson		Leandor Merrill	Union	Black River Falls
25	Columbia	1	A. J. Turner	Union	Portage
25	Columbia	2	Robert B. Sanderson	Union	Poynette
25	Columbia	3	Evan O. Jones	Union	Cambria
30	Crawford		George E. Harrington	Dem.	Boscobel
11	Dane	1	William D. Potter	Union	Cambridge
11	Dane	2	John M. Flint	Union	Sun Prairie
26	Dane	3	George H. Slaughter	Dem.	Mendota
26	Dane	4	William Charlton	Union	Verona
26	Dane	5	Benjamin F. Hopkins	Union	Madison
18	Dodge	1	Oliver Ashley	Union	Westford
18	Dodge	2	Andrew Willard	Union	Beaver Dam
18	Dodge	3	Hiram Sawyer	Dem.	Burnett
33	Dodge	4	Jacob Bodden	Dem.	Theresa
33	Dodge	5	William M. Morse	Dem.	Ashippun
22	Door, Oconto, Shawano		Isaac Stephenson	Union	Marinette
20	Fond du Lac	1	Albert M. Skeels	Union	Ripon
20	Fond du Lac	2	George F. Clark	Union	Bugle
20	Fond du Lac	3	James Coleman	Union	Fond du Lac
20	Fond du Lac	4	Joseph Wagner	Dem.	Moria
20	Fond du Lac	5	Andrew J. Dieringer	Dem.	Auburn
16	Grant	1	Hanmer Robbins	Union	Platteville
16	Grant	2	Wiley S. Scribner	Union	Fair Play
16	Grant	3	Alanson P. Hammond	Union	Montfort
16	Grant	4	George H. Washburn	Union	Millville
16	Grant	5	Alvery A. Bennett	Union	Glen Haven
24	Green	1	Daniel Smiley	Union	Albany
24	Green	2	Egbert E. Carr	Union	Monroe
29	Green Lake		William A. Bugh	Union	Berlin
15	Iowa	1	Elihu B. Goodsell	Dem.	Highland
15	Iowa	2	James Spensley	Union	Mineral Point
23	Jefferson	1	Patrick Rogan	Dem.	Watertown
23	Jefferson	2	John Mosher	Union	Waterloo
23	Jefferson	3	William W. Reed	Union	Jefferson
23	Jefferson	4	Henry Harnden	Union	Rome
09	Juneau		Eliphalet S. Miner	Union	New Lisbon
08	Kenosha		Franklin Newell	Union	Kenosha
02	Kewaunee		Constant Martin	Dem.	Dyckesville
31	La Crosse		Angus Cameron	Union	La Crosse
13	Lafayette	1	David J. Seely	Dem.	Elk Grove
13	Lafayette	2	John Armstrong	Union	Wiota
19	Manitowoc	1	Nicholas Dittmar	Union	Meeme
19	Manitowoc	2	William Eatough	Dem.	Brant's Mills
19	Manitowoc	3	David Smoke	Dem.	Two Rivers
27	Marathon, Wood		Bradbury G. Plumer	Dem.	Wausau
29	Marquette		Spencer A. Pease	Dem.	Montello
05	Milwaukee	1	Jackson Hadley	Dem.	Milwaukee
05	Milwaukee	2	William Pitt Lynde	Dem.	Milwaukee
06	Milwaukee	3	James McGrath	Dem.	Milwaukee
06	Milwaukee	4	Ammi R. Butler	Dem.	Milwaukee
06	Milwaukee	5	Charles H. Orton	Dem.	Milwaukee
05	Milwaukee	6	Joseph Phillips	Dem.	Milwaukee
05	Milwaukee	7	Edward Daley	Dem.	Brown Deer
06	Milwaukee	8	Truman H. Curtis	Dem.	Wauwatosa
06	Milwaukee	9	John H. Deuster	Dem.	Milwaukee
31	Monroe		DeWitt C. Wilson	Union	Sparta
22	Outagamie		W. H. P. Bogan (until Jan. 30)	Dem.	Appleton
22	Outagamie		Henry Turner (From Jan. 30)	Union	Appleton
03	Ozaukee		James McCarthy	Dem.	Port Washington
28	Pierce, St. Croix		William J. Copp	Union	Prescott
27	Portage		James O. Raymond	Union	Plover
07	Racine	1	James O. Bartlett	Union	Racine
07	Racine	2	George Q. Erskine	Union	Racine
07	Racine	3	Philo Belden	Union	Rochester
30	Richland		Henry L. Eaton	Union	Lone Rock
17	Rock	1	Anson W. Pope	Union	Janesville
17	Rock	2	Burrows Burdick	Union	Edgerton
17	Rock	3	Henry S. Wooster	Union	Clinton
17	Rock	4	Edward P. King	Union	Beloit
17	Rock	5	Allen C. Bates	Union	Janesville
17	Rock	6	Alanson C. Douglass	Union	Hanover
14	Sauk	1	William Palmer	Union	Loganville
14	Sauk	2	Rollin M. Strong	Union	Reedsburg
01	Sheboygan	1	Billie Williams	Union	Sheboygan
01	Sheboygan	2	Samuel Rounseville	Union	Sheboygan Falls
01	Sheboygan	3	John P. Carroll	Dem.	Adell
01	Sheboygan	4	Julius Wolff	Union	Rhine
30	Vernon	1	Newton F. Carpenter	Union	De Soto
30	Vernon	2	Alexander Woods	Union	Hillsboro
12	Walworth	1	William C. Allen	Union	Delavan
12	Walworth	2	Thomas Davis	Union	Sugar Creek
12	Walworth	3	Shepard O. Raymond	Union	Geneva
12	Walworth	4	Paris Pettit	Union	East Troy
04	Washington	1	James Kenealy	Dem.	Toland's Prairie
04	Washington	2	Mitchell L. Delaney	Dem.	Barton
04	Washington	3	Philip Schneider	Dem.	Barton
10	Waukesha	1	Daniel Brown	Dem.	Elm Grove
10	Waukesha	2	Samuel Thompson	Union	Hartland
10	Waukesha	3	Peter D. Gifford	Dem.	North Prairie
10	Waukesha	4	Jesse Smith	Union	Dodge's Corners
27	Waupaca		Albert Osborn	Union	Iola
09	Waushara		Oscar Babcock	Union	Dakota
21	Winnebago	1	William H. Doe	Union	Oshkosh
21	Winnebago	2	John Proctor	Union	Neenah
21	Winnebago	3	William Simmons	Union	Oshkosh
