= Peter V. Deuster =

19th century American congressman

Peter Victor Deuster
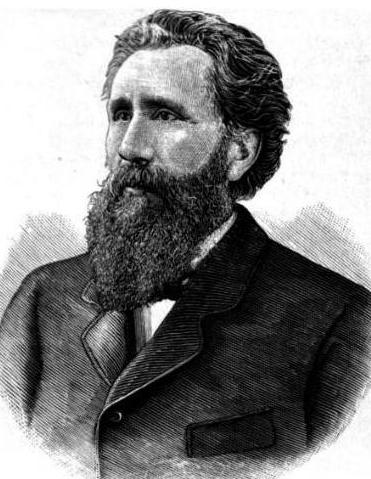

Member of the U.S. House of Representatives from Wisconsin's 4th district
- In office March 4, 1879 – March 3, 1885
- Preceded by: William P. Lynde
- Succeeded by: Isaac W. Van Schaick

Member of the Wisconsin Senate from the 6th district
- In office January 3, 1870 – January 1, 1872
- Preceded by: Charles H. Larkin
- Succeeded by: John L. Mitchell

Member of the Wisconsin State Assembly from the Milwaukee 5th district
- In office January 5, 1863 – January 4, 1864
- Preceded by: John M. Stowell
- Succeeded by: J. C. U. Niedermann

Personal details
- Born: February 13, 1831 Düren, Rhenish Prussia, German Confederation
- Died: December 31, 1904 (aged 73) Milwaukee, Wisconsin, U.S.
- Resting place: Calvary Cemetery, Milwaukee
- Party: Democratic
- Spouse: Agathe Gertrude Stoltz (m. 1860–1904)
- Children: 5
- Occupation: Newspaperman

Peter Victor Deuster (February 13, 1831 – December 31, 1904) was a German American immigrant, newspaperman, diplomat, and Democratic politician. He represented Milwaukee, Wisconsin, in the United States House of Representatives for three terms (1879–1885) and was American consul at Krefeld, Germany, during the presidency of Grover Cleveland.

He was a notorious Copperhead during the American Civil War, using his German language newspaper, the Milwaukee See-Bote, to inflame racial animosity and rail against abolition and the war. His newspaper was described as one of the key instigators of the November 1862 draft riot in Port Washington, Wisconsin.

== Background and early business career ==
Born in Düren, Rhenish Prussia, Deuster immigrated to the United States with his parents, who settled on a farm near Milwaukee in May 1847. Deuster had pursued an academic course at a college in Düren, but left too young to graduate.

He completed his self-education in a printing office. He started a Milwaukee newspaper called the Hausfreund in 1852; it was later taken over by George Brumder's Germania Publishing. He moved to Port Washington, Wisconsin, in 1854 and edited a newspaper. He also served simultaneously as deputy postmaster, deputy clerk of the circuit court, clerk of the land office, and notary public.

He returned to Milwaukee in 1856 and edited the Milwaukee See-Bote (later Seebote), a German language Democratic daily paper, until 1860, when he became proprietor.

=== Deuster as Copperhead ===
The See-Bote had been founded by Archbishop John Henni as an anti-radical organ, and under Deuster's leadership it took a strong stance against German radicals and radicalism, calling Carl Schurz "a political mountebank" and railing against the new Republican Party with its freethinkers and abolitionism. During the American Civil War, Deuster was widely reviled as a prominent Copperhead, as he opposed the abolitionist influence on the Lincoln administration and defended General George B. McClellan against his critics. He encouraged negrophobia in his immigrant readers, warning that emancipation and abolitionism would lead to a "Negrocracy" as free whites were forced to compete with cheaper "black cattle," and referred to the abolitionist Milwaukee Herold as part of the "German Nigger Press". Deuster and the See-Bote were widely blamed for the November 10, 1862, anti-draft riot in nearby Port Washington. The commander of the German-majority Union Army of South-east Missouri forbade the circulation of the paper in areas under his control. Abraham Lincoln, described in the See-Bote as "the most incapable of statesmen and the most irresponsible of the butchers of men", was defended only when Deuster saw him as being harried by the more radical elements within the Republican Party. Unlike some Copperhead newspaper editors, Deuster publicly mourned Lincoln's assassination, expressing a fear that it would give free rein to the Radical Republicans and unleash a policy of "retribution and revenge".

== In the legislature and out ==
He served as a Democratic member of the Wisconsin State Assembly in 1863, succeeding fellow Democrat John M. Stowell. He was assigned to the standing committees on state affairs and federal relations. He was subject to attacks in the Assembly because of the editorial stances of the See-Bote. He was not re-elected, and was succeeded in 1864 by J.C.U. Niedermann, elected on the National Union Party ticket. At this same time, his brother Joseph Deuster was also active in Democratic politics (at various times a member of the Common Council, sheriff, and sergeant-at-arms of the State Assembly).

In 1870 Peter purchased the Chicago Daily Union.

He was elected to the Wisconsin State Senate's Sixth District (the 3rd, 4th, 5th and 8th Wards of the City of Milwaukee, and the Towns of Franklin, Greenfield, Lake, Oak Creek and Wauwatosa) in 1870, with 2178 votes to 1704 for incumbent Charles H. Larkin, a one-time War Democrat who chose to run as an independent. He was not a candidate for re-election in 1872, and was succeeded by fellow Democrat John L. Mitchell.

== Congress ==
Deuster was narrowly elected in 1878 as a Democrat to the Forty-sixth Congress to succeed retiring Democratic incumbent William Pitt Lynde in Wisconsin's 4th congressional district (Milwaukee, Ozaukee and Washington counties) with 11,157 votes to 11,022 for Republican former Assemblyman Leander Frisby and 1,351 for Greenbacker and former National Union Assemblyman Truman H. Judd He served as chairman of the Committee on Expenditures on Public Buildings.

He was re-elected to the Forty-seventh Congress (17.574 votes to 15,018 for Republican former Assemblyman Casper Sanger) and Forty-eighth Congress (9,688 votes to 8,320 for Republican former Assemblyman Frederick Winkler and 1,922 for former Republican Assemblyman George B. Goodwin, "trades' assembly" candidate). Deuster was publishing The Daily Journal a part of his re-election campaign for the 48th Congress. The young Lucius W. Nieman bought an interest in the paper and took over when Deuster was successfully re-elected. Nieman grew the publication and changed its name to The Milwaukee Journal.

Deuster was unsuccessful in seeking reelection in 1884 to the Forty-ninth Congress, losing to Isaac W. Van Schaick: with 15,967 votes; to 16,783 for Van Schaick; 1,296 for the Union Labor candidate, Alderman and former Socialist Assemblyman Henry Smith; and 226 for C. E. Reed.

== After Congress ==
Deuster's grave at Calvary Cemetery

He again resumed his newspaper interests, publishing the Seebote and a German language weekly titled Telephone. He was appointed chairman of a commission to diminish the Umatilla Indian reservation in Oregon in 1887. He was appointed consul at Krefeld, Germany, February 19, 1896, and served until a successor was appointed October 15, 1897. In 1898, he was the Democratic nominee for Lieutenant Governor of Wisconsin, losing in a six-way race to Republican Jesse Stone with 180,038 votes, to 126,206 votes for Deuster; 8,267 votes for Populist Spencer Palmer: 7.846 votes for Prohibitionist Willis W. Cooper; 2,535 votes for Social Democratic Party of America candidate Edward P. Hassinger; and 1,543 votes for Herman C. Gauger of the Socialist Labor Party.

He died in Milwaukee December 31, 1904, and was interred in Calvary Cemetery.

There is no source to prove that he and Joseph were related to John H. Deuster, although they were all three born in Prussia, moved to Milwaukee, and became active Democratic Party politicians and legislators.

Wisconsin State Assembly
Preceded by John M. Stowell	Member of the Wisconsin State Assembly from the Milwaukee 5th district January 5, 1863 – January 4, 1864	Succeeded by J. C. U. Niedermann
Wisconsin Senate
Preceded by Charles H. Larkin	Member of the Wisconsin Senate from the 6th district January 3, 1870 – January 1, 1872	Succeeded by John L. Mitchell
U.S. House of Representatives
Preceded by William Pitt Lynde	Member of the U.S. House of Representatives from Wisconsin's 4th congressional district March 4, 1879 – March 3, 1885	Succeeded by Isaac W. Van Schaick
