= Charles H. Larkin =

American politician (1810–1894)

Member of the Wisconsin Senate from the 6th district
- In office January 1, 1866 – January 3, 1870
- Preceded by: Hugh Reynolds
- Succeeded by: Peter V. Deuster

Member of the Wisconsin State Assembly from the Milwaukee 5th district
- In office January 5, 1874 – January 3, 1876
- Preceded by: John A. Becher
- Succeeded by: David Vance
- In office January 1, 1872 – January 3, 1873
- Preceded by: Charles F. Freeman
- Succeeded by: John A. Becher

Sheriff of Milwaukee County, Wisconsin
- In office January 1, 1861 – January 1, 1863
- Preceded by: Andrew J. Langworthy
- Succeeded by: Nelson Webster

Personal details
- Born: May 12, 1810 Stonington, Connecticut, U.S.
- Died: August 16, 1894 (aged 84) Milwaukee, Wisconsin, U.S.
- Resting place: Forest Home Cemetery, Milwaukee
- Party: Democratic
- Spouse: Louise Abigail Durkee (m. 1836; died 1889)
- Children: Charles Henry Larkin Jr.^{(b. 1838; died 1912)}; Louise Durkee (Smith)^{(b. 1840; died 1914)}; Courtland Palmer Larkin^{(b. 1844; died 1920)}; Clarence D. Larkin^{(b. 1847; died 1920)}
- Occupation: Merchant

Charles Henry Larkin Sr. (May 12, 1810 – August 16, 1894) was an American merchant, real estate developer, Democratic politician, and Wisconsin pioneer. He served four years in the Wisconsin Senate (1866–1870) and three years in the State Assembly (1872, 1874, 1875), representing southern Milwaukee County; he also served two years as sheriff (1861 & 1862).

Before Wisconsin achieved statehood, Larkin was one of the earliest settlers in Milwaukee County, and served as a delegate from Milwaukee County to Wisconsin's second constitutional convention, which drafted the Constitution of Wisconsin in the winter of 1847–1848.

== Background ==
Larkin was born in Stonington, Connecticut, on May 2, 1810. He attended private schools (no public schools being available) until the age of sixteen, at which time he took a job as a retail clerk in the town of Alden, New York (to which his family had moved in 1825), and worked there for three years, before moving on to similar positions in Buffalo and elsewhere. In 1836 he arrived in the Milwaukee area, after having visited Michigan and other western territories, and settled there. He laid claim to a quarter-section of land in Greenfield township, and lived there for two years to perfect his title to the land. While doing so, he bought and sold horses and engaged in various businesses. In 1848 he opened a store at the foot of East Water Street in the City of Milwaukee and dealt extensively in produce, livestock, and so forth. He also invested in real estate, and after a few years retired from other business and gave his attention chiefly to his real-estate interests.

== Politics ==
He started his political life as an ardent admirer of Henry Clay and a Whig. During his residence in Greenfield he served as a member of the Milwaukee County board of supervisors. He served as a Sergeant-at-Arms for the Wisconsin Territorial Council's 1845 session; he was a delegate from Milwaukee County to the second Wisconsin constitutional convention. He was appointed Milwaukee County treasurer; was appointed a pension agent by President James Buchanan, and served four years; served on the Milwaukee Board of School Directors (school board) for four years, and was elected sheriff of Milwaukee County in 1860 and served two years.

In 1862, Larkin was commissioned a colonel by the governor to raise a regiment of troops. Feeling too old to engage in warfare, instead he assisted his son, Courtland P. Larkin, to enlist a company of the 38th Wisconsin Volunteer Infantry Regiment.

Beginning in 1866, he was a Democratic member of the Wisconsin State Senate from the Sixth District (the 3rd, 4th, 5th and 8th Wards of the City of Milwaukee, and the Towns of Milwaukee, Greenfield, Lake, and Oak Creek), succeeding fellow Democrat Hugh Reynolds; he was assigned to the standing committee on banks and banking, but switched to that on railroads for the 1868 and 1869 sessions. In the 1870 election he ran as an Independent and was defeated by Democratic candidate Peter V. Deuster, by 2178 to 1704.

In 1871, identified as a War Democrat, he was elected as a member of the Wisconsin State Assembly from the Fifth Milwaukee County Assembly district (the 5th and 12th Wards of Milwaukee), with 508 votes to 325 for Republican John Lund. He lost his seat in the 1872 election to Republican John A. Becher by 703 votes to Becher's 773, but reclaimed it from him the next year, by 822 to 714, and defeated Republican David Vance in 1874. He was not a candidate in 1875, and Vance won the election to succeed him.

== Personal life and later years ==
He built a block of stores on Reed Street, and as late as 1893 was engaged in the construction of a block of buildings downtown. His religious affiliation was with the Episcopal church. He was deeply interested in the Milwaukee County Pioneer Society. He died at his home in Milwaukee on August 16, 1894.

== Electoral history ==
=== Wisconsin Senate (1865, 1867, 1869) ===
Wisconsin Senate, 6th District Election, 1869
Party	Candidate	Votes	%	±%
General Election, November 2, 1869
Democratic	Peter V. Deuster	2,178	56.11%	
Independent Democrat	Charles H. Larkin (incumbent)	1,704	43.89%	
Plurality		474	12.21%	
Total votes		3,882	100.0%	
Democratic hold				

=== Wisconsin Assembly (1871, 1872, 1873, 1874) ===
Year	Date	Elected				Defeated				Total	Plurality
1871	Nov. 7	Charles H. Larkin	Democratic	525	59.86%	John Lund	Rep.	352	40.14%	877	173
1872	Nov. 5	John A. Becher	Republican	773	52.37%	Charles H. Larkin (inc)	Dem.	703	47.63%	1,476	70
1873	Nov. 4	Charles H. Larkin	Democratic	822	53.52%	John A. Becher (inc)	Rep.	714	46.48%	1,536	108
1874	Nov. 3	Charles H. Larkin (inc)	Democratic	829	51.65%	David Vance	Rep.	776	48.35%	1,605	53

Wisconsin State Assembly
Preceded by Charles F. Freeman	Member of the Wisconsin State Assembly from the Milwaukee 5th district January 1, 1872 – January 3, 1873	Succeeded by John A. Becher
Preceded by John A. Becher	Member of the Wisconsin State Assembly from the Milwaukee 5th district January 5, 1874 – January 3, 1876	Succeeded by David Vance
Wisconsin Senate
Preceded by Hugh Reynolds	Member of the Wisconsin Senate from the 6th district January 1, 1866 – January 3, 1870	Succeeded by Peter V. Deuster
Legal offices
Preceded by Andrew J. Langworthy	Sheriff of Milwaukee County, Wisconsin; January 1, 1861 – January 1, 1863	Succeeded by Nelson Webster
