= Valentin Knœll =

American politician (1826–1884)

Valentin Johann Knœll [sometimes spelled Valentine; sometimes Knoell, Knoel or Knoll] (May 8, 1826 - August 26, 1884) was an American farmer from Franklin, Wisconsin who served three one-year terms as a member of the Wisconsin State Assembly between the 1850s and the 1870s.

== Background ==
He was born in Darmstadt, Grand Duchy of Hesse, on May 8, 1826, and came with his family to Wisconsin in 1837, settling in Franklin. He received a common school education, and became a farmer.

== Public office ==
He was first elected to the Assembly in 1851 for the 1852 5th Wisconsin Legislature from the Milwaukee County district including Franklin and Oak Creek as a Democrat, with 274 votes to 180 for James Riordan (also a Democrat)

He was again elected in 1866 for a one-year term in the 1867 20th Wisconsin Legislature from the new 9th Milwaukee County district (the Towns of Franklin, Greenfield, Lake, and Oak Creek) after the 1866 redistricting, succeeding fellow Democrat John H. Deuster. He was assigned to the standing committee on mining and smelting. He was succeeded by fellow Democrat Patrick Walsh.

His last term was in the 24th Wisconsin Legislature of 1871. He was elected in 1870 from the same district as before, with 1,032 votes to 403 for Republican Henry Bauer, succeeding fellow Democrat Enoch Chase. He was assigned to the committee on town and county organization. By that time he had served as chairman of the town board for seven or eight years, and had thus been ex officio a member of the Milwaukee County board of supervisors. He was not a candidate for re-election, and was succeeded by Republican Adin P. Hobart.

== After the Assembly ==
He was still an active Democrat at least through October 1878, attending a district meeting and being re-elected to the district's Democratic committee.

He died August 26, 1884, in Franklin.

== Genealogy ==
Genealogical websites claim that he was actually born in Richen, then a dorf in Dieburg kreis but now part of Darmstadt-Dieburg kreis, just outside of Darmstadt proper., the son of Christoph Knœll and Anna Margaretha Mueller. He reportedly married Philippine "Bena" Zimmerman (1832–1917) on May 30, 1850, in Milwaukee, with whom he would have nine sons and three daughters between 1857 and 1872.
