= David Vance =

David Vance may refer to:

- David Vance (soldier) (c. 1745 – 1813), American soldier in the Revolutionary War
- David Vance (politician) (1836–1912), American shipmaster and politician
- David R. Vance (born 1940), American Thoroughbred horse racing trainer
