= James Riordan =

James Riordan may refer to:

- James Riordan (actor) (born 1969), American actor
- James Riordan (author), music journalist, screenwriter, biographer of Jim Morrison
- James Riordan (Iowa politician) (1949–2022), 20th-century Iowa legislator
- James Riordan (Wisconsin politician), 19th-century Wisconsin legislator
- James Riordan (writer-sportsman) (1936–2012), British writer, football player and Russian scholar
- Jim Riordan (1882–1955), Australian politician and judge
