= Senator Elwood =

Senator Elwood may refer to:

- Augustus R. Elwood (1819–1881), New York State Senate
- G. DeWitt Elwood (1818–1868), Wisconsin State Senate
