= Senator Lincoln (disambiguation) =

Blanche Lincoln (born 1960) was a U.S. Senator from Arkansas from 1999 to 2011. Senator Lincoln may also refer to:

- Alanson T. Lincoln (1858–1925), Virginia State Senate
- Georgianna Lincoln (born 1943), Alaska State Senate
- J. William Lincoln (born 1940), Pennsylvania State Senate
- Levi Lincoln Jr. (1782–1868), Massachusetts State Senate
- Levi Lincoln Sr. (1749–1820), Massachusetts State Senate
- Wyman Lincoln (1828–1894), Wisconsin State Senate
