= D. Manfield Stearns =

American politician

D. Manfield Stearns (August 18, 1839—May 5, 1889) was a member of the Wisconsin State Assembly.

== Biography ==
Daniel Manfield Stearns was born on August 18, 1839, in Bakersfield, Vermont. He later resided in Sugar Creek, Wisconsin. Stearns was a farmer, and served in local office including justice of the peace and town clerk.

== Assembly career ==
Stearns was a member of the Assembly during the 1876 session. He was a Republican.

== Death and burial ==
Stearns died in Sugar Creek on May 5, 1889. He was buried at Mount Pleasant Cemetery in Tibbets, Wisconsin.
