= John H. Deuster =

19th century American politician and brewer

Member of the Wisconsin State Assembly from the Milwaukee 9th district
- In office January 1, 1866 – January 7, 1867
- Preceded by: Richard White
- Succeeded by: Valentin Knœll

Personal details
- Born: ca. 1811 Kingdom of Prussia
- Died: September 27, 1882 (aged 70–71) Suttons Bay, Michigan, U.S.
- Resting place: Saint Michaels Catholic Cemetery, Suttons Bay, Michigan
- Party: Democratic

John H. Deuster (ca. 1811 – September 27, 1882) was a German American immigrant and merchant who served a single one-year term in 1866 as a Democratic member of the Wisconsin State Assembly from southern Milwaukee County.

He was born in the Kingdom of Prussia. At the January 1866 commencement of the 19th Wisconsin Legislature, he was 54 years old and had been in Wisconsin for 21 years. He listed his profession as "merchant".

He was elected in 1865 for a one-year term from the 9th Milwaukee County district (the Towns of Franklin, Lake, and Oak Creek) succeeding fellow Democrat Richard White. He was assigned to the standing committee on roads, bridges and ferries. He was succeeded the next year by fellow Democrat Valentin Knœll.

There is no source to indicate whether he was related to Peter V. Deuster or Joseph Deuster, although they were all three born in Prussia, moved to Milwaukee, and became active Democratic Party politicians and legislators.
