= Richard Kennedy (Wisconsin politician) =

American politician

Richard Regan Kennedy (January 5, 1842 – November 30, 1903) was a member of the Wisconsin State Assembly.

== Biography ==
Kennedy was born in Minersville, Pennsylvania in 1842. He moved to Wisconsin with his parents when he was an infant. During the American Civil War, he was an orderly sergeant with the 27th Wisconsin Volunteer Infantry Regiment of the Union Army. Conflicts he took part include the Siege of Vicksburg. After the war, he was involved in zinc mining. Kennedy died of an abscess of the thigh on November 30, 1903 in Racine, Wisconsin.

== Political career ==
Kennedy was a member of the Assembly during the 1880 and 1883 sessions. Additionally, he was Town Treasurer and Collector of Highland, Iowa County, Wisconsin. He was a Democrat.
