= New Coeln, Wisconsin =

Coordinates: 42.937°N 87.91°W

New Coeln (also called New Cöln, New Koeln and New Köln) is a neighborhood, formerly a rural hamlet in the Town of Lake of Milwaukee County, Wisconsin, United States, but now part of Milwaukee. It was settled by a group of German immigrants from the area around Cologne (German Köln) in the 1840s. By 1847, there were about fifty settlers, and a new Catholic parish, St. Stephen's, was formed. In the 1898 Hand Book of Wisconsin: Its History and Geography ... and Resources, Industries, and Commerce, it is listed as having a population of 35, and is described as follows:

It has a blacksmith shop and a daily mail.

The portion of the former settlement west of Howell Avenue is now part of the grounds of General Mitchell International Airport, but the inn known variously as Deuster's Saloon, New Coeln House, and the New Coeln House Dancehall is still open (currently branded as the Landmark 1850 Inn), and is on the National Register of Historic Places.

== Notable residents ==
- Aloysius Arnolds, farmer who held township office and served in the state legislature
- Joseph Deuster, farmer, politician and keeper of Deuster's Tavern/New Coeln House
- Kilian Caspar Flasch, former pastor at St. Stephens who eventually served as Bishop of La Crosse
- William Lawler, farmer who held various local offices and served in the legislature

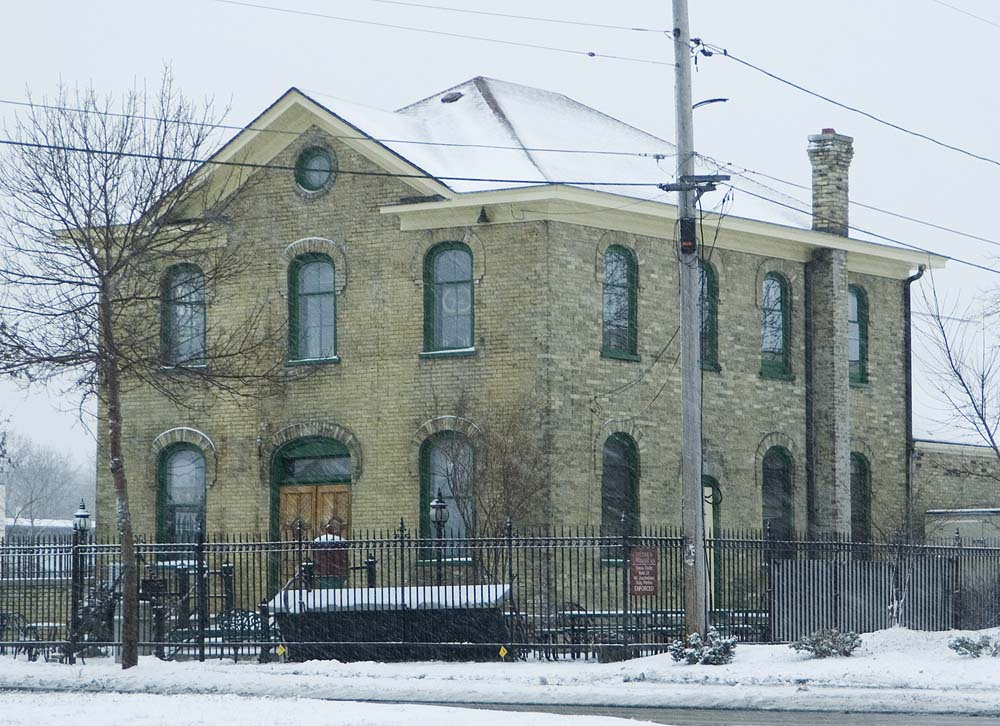
New Coeln House, historic inn still standing on the border of Mitchell Field
