= Richard White (Wisconsin politician) =

19th century American politician

Member of the Wisconsin State Assembly from the Milwaukee 9th district
- In office January 2, 1865 – January 1, 1866
- Preceded by: Anton Frey
- Succeeded by: John H. Deuster

Personal details
- Born: 1827 Ireland
- Died: October 8, 1895 (aged 67–68) Milwaukee, Wisconsin, US
- Resting place: Calvary Cemetery, Milwaukee, Wisconsin
- Party: Democratic
- Spouse: Mary
- Children: 6

Richard J. White (1827 – October 8, 1895) was an Irish American immigrant, farmer, and Democratic politician. He served one term in the Wisconsin State Assembly, representing southern Milwaukee County.

== Biography ==
White's grave at Calvary Cemetery

Richard White was born in Ireland in 1827. He emigrated to the United States and came to reside on a farm in Oak Creek, Wisconsin Territory, around 1841. He became involved with the Democratic Party. In 1857, he was an unsuccessful candidate for Wisconsin State Assembly, losing to Republican Orlando Ellsworth. He ran again in 1864, and this time was elected to the 1865 session. In the Assembly, he served on the committee on local legislation. In the 1870s, White moved with his family to Algoma, Wisconsin.

He died at his home in Milwaukee on October 8, 1895, and was buried at Calvary Cemetery.

== Family ==
His son, also named Richard J. White, served as United States Marshal in Milwaukee from 1923 until his death in July 1928.

Another son, William, served as postmaster at Algoma from 1897 until his death in 1927.

Wisconsin State Assembly
Preceded by Anton Frey	Member of the Wisconsin State Assembly from the Milwaukee 9th district January 2, 1865 – January 1, 1866	Succeeded by John H. Deuster
