= Joseph Deuster =

American politician

Joseph Peter Deuster (October 14, 1833 - June 5, 1914) was an American sheriff, postmaster and Democratic politician, who served a single two-year term as a member of the Wisconsin State Assembly. He was the brother of Peter V. Deuster.

== Background ==
Deuster was born October 14, 1833, in Berg vor Nideggen, in Düren kreis of the Rhine Province of the Kingdom of Prussia, son of John Hubert and Anna Barbara (Eppnech) Deuster. In 1844 he came with his family to Wisconsin, and they settled in Milwaukee. He attended the public schools, and became a dealer in wines and liquors.

== Public service ==
During the American Civil War, he was commissioned an enrolling and recruiting officer by Governor Edward Salomon on August 28, 1862. Deuster was a member of the Milwaukee Common Council for the 1862–66, 1871 and 1873 terms. He was Sheriff of Milwaukee County in 1867 and 1868, and was Sergeant-at-Arms of the state assembly for the 1874 term (at which time he listed his profession as "Lumberman").

He was elected for the Assembly's new 8th Milwaukee County district (the 5th and 12th Wards of the City of Milwaukee) in 1892, receiving 2,488 votes to 2,103 for Republican William A. Bahr, 83 for Populist Fred Ball, and 6 for Prohibitionist W. H. Edwards, Jr. (Michael Krusczka, Democratic incumbent of one of the two old districts from which the new 8th district was assembled, ran for the Wisconsin Senate; and Conrad Krez did not seek re-election.) He was assigned to the standing committees on state affairs, and on enrolled bills; he was chairman of the latter. He was not a candidate for re-election in 1894, and was succeeded by Republican Ellicott R. Stillman.

In 1894, he became superintendent of the United States Post Office substation on the South Side of Milwaukee, a patronage position from which he was asked to step down in 1898 in favor of the prior incumbent, a Civil War veteran.

== Later life and death ==
The Deusters had a farm in New Coeln, where his parents had settled, and Joseph managed a tavern there known as Deuster's Saloon or the New Coeln House (still operating in 2021).

On June 9, 1897, his wife, Appolonia Romeo Deuster, died after a botched attempt at suicide. Contemporary accounts state that she suffered from nervous prostration, and had previously threatened suicide. Deuster awoke on June 7 to see his wife "standing at his beside enveloped in flames", having set her clothes on fire.

In the 1900 Federal census, he was listed as a widower, still managing the New Coeln House, with several of his grown children at home.

Deuster died June 5, 1914, in Evansville, Indiana, and is buried at Holy Trinity Cemetery in Milwaukee.
