= John A. Becher =

19th century American politician

Member of the Wisconsin State Assembly from the Milwaukee 5th district
- In office January 6, 1873 – January 5, 1874
- Preceded by: Charles H. Larkin
- Succeeded by: Charles H. Larkin

Personal details
- Born: March 13, 1833 Weimar, Saxe-Weimar-Eisenach
- Died: December 30, 1915 (aged 82) Milwaukee, Wisconsin, U.S.
- Cause of death: Pneumonia
- Resting place: Forest Home Cemetery, Milwaukee
- Party: Republican
- Spouse: Johanna Krueger (m. 1857)
- Children: Franklin A. Becher; Emily (adopted)
- Occupation: Real estate dealer

Military service
- Allegiance: United States
- Branch/service: United States Volunteers; Union Army
- Years of service: 1862–1863
- Rank: 1st Lieutenant, USV (Quartermaster)
- Unit: 34th Reg. Wis. Vol. Infantry
- Battles/wars: American Civil War

John Augustus Becher (March 13, 1833 – December 30, 1915) was a German American immigrant, businessman, and Republican politician. He was a member of the Wisconsin State Assembly, representing Milwaukee during the 1873 session and served several years on Wisconsin's board of immigration.

== Biography ==
Born in Weimar, Saxe-Weimar-Eisenach, Becher emigrated to the United States in 1853 and then settled in Milwaukee, Wisconsin, in 1857. During the American Civil War, Becher served in the 34th Wisconsin Infantry Regiment and was quartermaster. Becher was in the real estate business. He was a member of the Wisconsin State Board of Immigration from 1869 to 1871. Becher served in the Wisconsin State Assembly in 1873 and was a Republican. He then served on the Milwaukee School Board from 1873 to 1877. Becher died in a hospital in Milwaukee, Wisconsin.
