= Peter Lavies =

American politician

Peter Lavies or Lavis, Sr. (c. 1790 – c. 1876) was a German-American farmer, tavernkeeper and sometime moneylender from Root Creek, Wisconsin. He was postmaster there, and served three one-year terms as a Democratic member of the Wisconsin State Assembly from Milwaukee County. His son Hubert Lavies succeeded him at different times as postmaster, and as Assemblyman.

Lavies was born in Niederdrees (now a district of Rheinbach) in the Kingdom of Prussia, around 1790. In 1844 he, his wife Margaret, and their three sons and four daughters moved to the Greenfield, Wisconsin area from Prussia, buying eighty acres of land at the intersection of roads which are now Cold Spring Road, South 76th Street, and Forest Home Avenue. In addition to farming, he ran a tavern, was postmaster, and lent money since there were no banks nearby (he charged interest rates from seven to ten percent).

By 1864, when his son Hubert Lavies became postmaster of Root Creek, Peter was a widower, and retired. He died at the age of 86 as the result of a fall from a wagon.
