= William Lawler (farmer-politician) =

American farmer & politician (1824–??)

William Lawler was a farmer from New Coeln, Wisconsin who served as a local official and spent a single one-year term as a member of the Wisconsin State Assembly. He was born in Gurteen, Queen's County, Ireland, on February 15, 1824. As of 1878, he had been in Wisconsin for 30 years.

Lawler was a Democrat, having been active in the area at least as far back as 1860, when he was secretary of a Democratic caucus in Oak Creek and was elected as a delegate to the county Democratic convention for that year. In 1863, he was elected as the Democratic candidate for the second school superintendent district in Milwaukee County. He was elected in 1877 to represent the 11th Milwaukee County Assembly district (the Towns of Franklin, Greenfield, lake and Oak Creek) in the 31st Wisconsin Legislature (fellow Democrat Aloysius Arnolds, also of New Coeln, was not a candidate), with 796 votes to 530 for Republican J. C. Crounse. He served as a member of the Assembly's standing committee on privileges and elections. Lawler was not a candidate for re-election in 1878; due to a tie vote, no successor was chosen in the general election in November of 1878, and a special election had to be proclaimed to elect a member for the 32nd Wisconsin Legislature. Republican William Wallace Johnson was elected to succeed Lawler.
