= Walter J. Dolan =

American politician

Walter Joseph Dolan (September 22, 1877 – August 14, 1956) was an American businessman and politician.

Born in the town of Highland, Iowa County, Wisconsin, Dolan moved to Shawano, Wisconsin and started the Dolan Land Company with his brother Pat in 1908. Dolan served on the Shawano County Board of Supervisors and on the Shawano Common Council. Dolan was active in the Democratic Party. He also served on the Shawano Municipal Hospital Board of Trustees and was secretary-treasurer on the hospital's board of directors. In 1933, Dolan served in the Wisconsin State Assembly. Dolan died in Shawano, Wisconsin after suffering a cerebral hemorrhage and colliding with another vehicle.
