= Highland (village), Iowa County, Wisconsin =

Highland
- Village
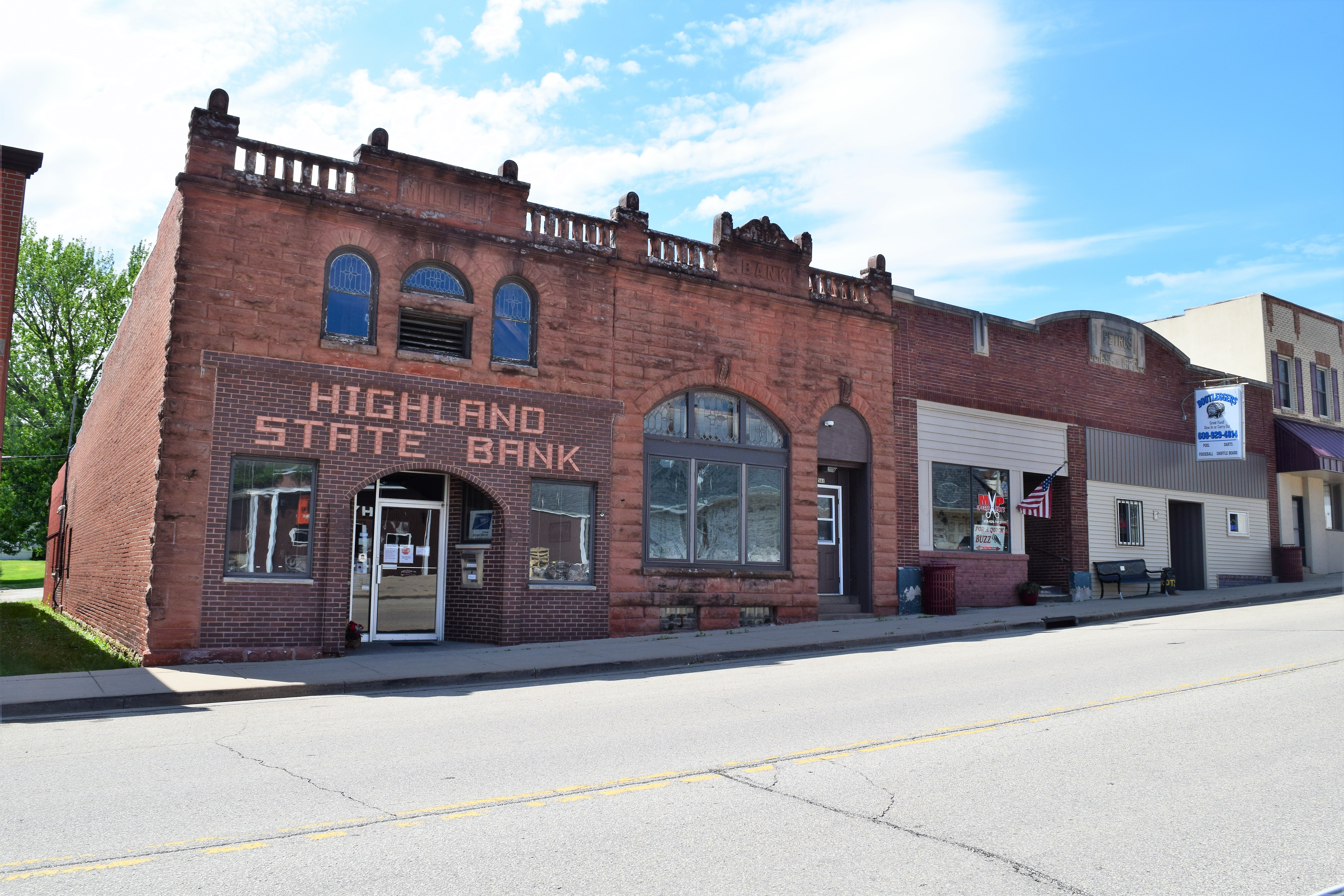
- Highland State Bank

- Location of Highland in Iowa County, Wisconsin.

- Location within the state of Wisconsin
- Coordinates: 43°2′47″N 90°22′45″W
- Country: United States
- State: Wisconsin
- County: Iowa

Government
  - Village President: George Breiwa

Area
  - Total: 1.14 sq mi (2.95 km^{2})
  - Land: 1.14 sq mi (2.95 km^{2})
  - Water: 0 sq mi (0.00 km^{2})

Population (2020)
  - Total: 874
  - Density: 767/sq mi (296/km^{2})
- Time zone: UTC-6 (Central (CST))
  - Summer (DST): UTC-5 (CDT)
- Area code: 608
- FIPS code: 55-34450
- Website: www.villageofhighland.net

Highland is a village in Iowa County, Wisconsin, United States. The population was 874 at the 2020 census. It is part of the Madison, Wisconsin metropolitan area. The village is located within the Town of Highland.

== Geography ==
Highland is located at 43°2′46″N 90°22′44″W (43.046347, -90.379083).

According to the United States Census Bureau, the village has a total area of 1.12 square miles (2.90 km^{2}), all land.

== Demographics ==
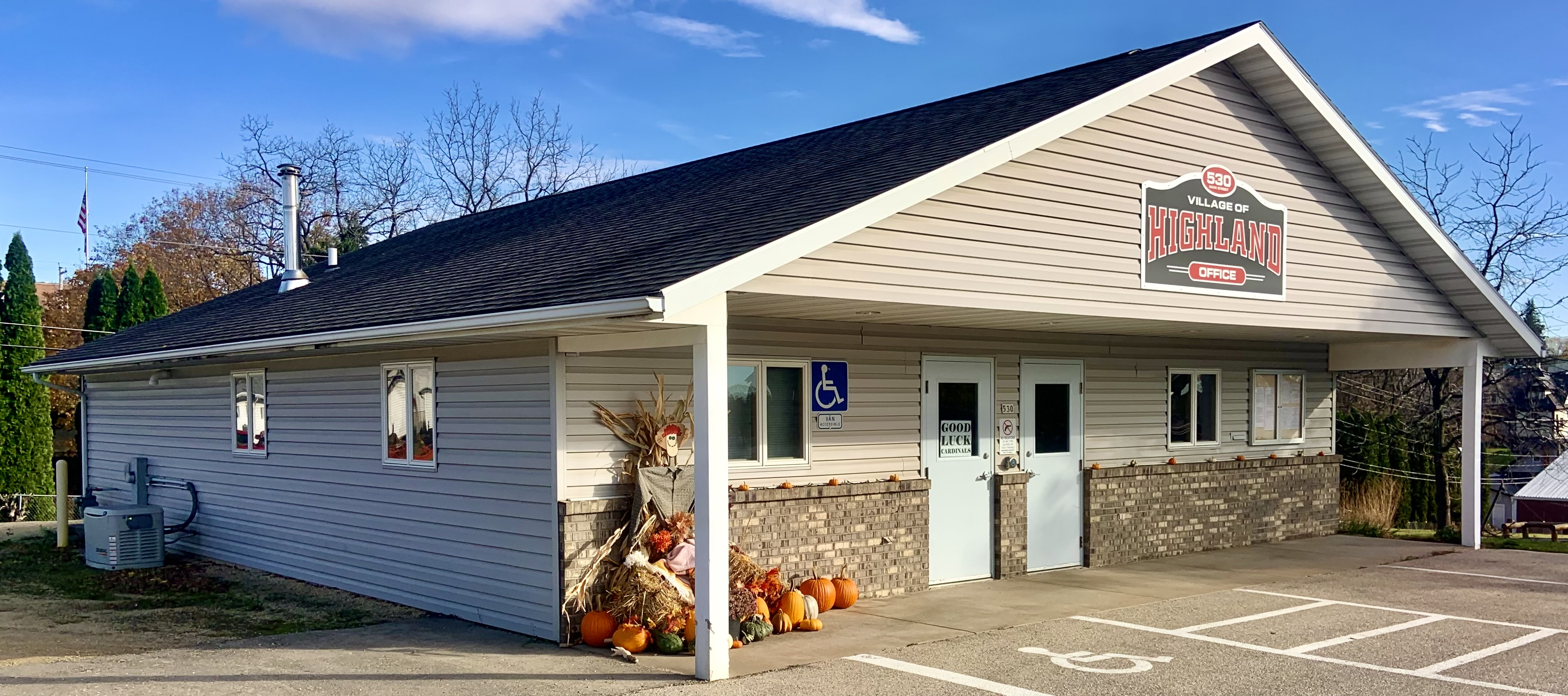
Highland Village Hall

Historical population
Census	Pop.	Note	%±
1870	482		—
1880	668		38.6%
1890	751		12.4%
1900	913		21.6%
1910	1,096		20.0%
1920	1,024		−6.6%
1930	739		−27.8%
1940	902		22.1%
1950	785		−13.0%
1960	741		−5.6%
1970	785		5.9%
1980	860		9.6%
1990	799		−7.1%
2000	855		7.0%
2010	842		−1.5%
2020	874		3.8%
U.S. Decennial Census

=== 2010 census ===
As of the census of 2010, there were 842 people, 351 households, and 226 families living in the village. The population density was 751.8 inhabitants per square mile (290.3/km^{2}). There were 386 housing units at an average density of 344.6 per square mile (133.1/km^{2}). The racial makeup of the village was 97.6% White, 0.4% African American, 0.7% Native American, 0.1% Asian, and 1.2% from two or more races. Hispanic or Latino of any race were 1.0% of the population.

There were 351 households, of which 28.8% had children under the age of 18 living with them, 55.0% were married couples living together, 7.7% had a female householder with no husband present, 1.7% had a male householder with no wife present, and 35.6% were non-families. 30.8% of all households were made up of individuals, and 14% had someone living alone who was 65 years of age or older. The average household size was 2.39 and the average family size was 3.04.

The median age in the village was 40.3 years. 23.3% of residents were under the age of 18; 6.5% were between the ages of 18 and 24; 24.8% were from 25 to 44; 29.3% were from 45 to 64; and 16.3% were 65 years of age or older. The gender makeup of the village was 51.0% male and 49.0% female.

=== 2000 census ===
As of the census of 2000, there were 855 people, 348 households, and 228 families living in the village. The population density was 756.0 people per square mile (292.1/km^{2}). There were 369 housing units at an average density of 326.3 per square mile (126.1/km^{2}). The racial makeup of the village was 100.00% White. 0.35% of the population were Hispanic or Latino of any race.

There were 348 households, out of which 29.6% had children under the age of 18 living with them, 54.6% were married couples living together, 8.9% had a female householder with no husband present, and 34.2% were non-families. 29.3% of all households were made up of individuals, and 18.1% had someone living alone who was 65 years of age or older. The average household size was 2.44 and the average family size was 3.03.

In the village, the population was spread out, with 23.9% under the age of 18, 11.1% from 18 to 24, 27.4% from 25 to 44, 19.2% from 45 to 64, and 18.5% who were 65 years of age or older. The median age was 36 years. For every 100 females, there were 96.1 males. For every 100 females age 18 and over, there were 90.4 males.

The median income for a household in the village was $37,228, and the median income for a family was $44,875. Males had a median income of $30,250 versus $22,000 for females. The per capita income for the village was $16,176. About 4.8% of families and 7.2% of the population were below the poverty line, including 2.4% of those under age 18 and 13.2% of those age 65 or over.

== Notable people ==
- Charles L. Billings, Illinois state senator and lawyer, was born in Highland.
- Elihu Goodsell was a farmer, miner, and politician, who first settled in Highland and founded the community.
