= Aloysius Arnolds =

American politician (1835–1896)

Aloysius Arnolds (December 17, 1835 - February 9, 1896) was an American farmer who served as a local official and as a member of the Wisconsin State Assembly.

== Biography ==
Arnolds was born in Simmerath, Prussia. He received a common school education and became a farmer. He emigrated to the United States, settling in New Coeln in the Town of Oak Creek in 1847. In 1865, he was elected treasurer of that township.

== Assembly career ==
In 1876, Arnolds was elected as a Democrat to the Assembly's 11th Milwaukee County district (the Towns of Franklin, Greenfield, Lake and Oak Creek) for the 1877 session, with 1,279 votes to 979 for Republican R. B. Brunn (the incumbent, Hubert Lavies, had been a member of the now-crumbling Reform Party, and was not a candidate). He was assigned to the standing committee on incorporations.

== Later life ==
He was not a candidate for re-election, and was succeeded by fellow Democrat William Lawler.

He died on February 9, 1896.
