= Adin P. Hobart =

American politician

Adin Parsons Hobart (1822–1881) was a member of the Wisconsin State Assembly during the 1872 session, succeeding Democrat Valentin Knœll. Additionally, he was Postmaster of Oak Creek, Wisconsin. Hobart was a Republican.

Hobart was born on March 15, 1822, in Homer, New York. He died on June 14, 1881, and was buried in South Milwaukee.
