= Perry G. Harrington =

American politician

Perry Green Harrington (July 9, 1812 – September 19, 1876) was an American politician and farmer.

Born in Laurens, New York, he moved to Milwaukee, Wisconsin Territory in 1836. In 1837, Harrington moved to Sugar Creek, Wisconsin Territory. He was a farmer. Harrington served on the Walworth County, Wisconsin Board of Supervisors. In 1854, Harrington served in the Wisconsin State Assembly. He died in Sugar Creek, Wisconsin.
