= Hubert Lavies =

American politician

Hubert Lavies (August 31, 1833 - October 21, 1905) was an American farmer from Root Creek, Wisconsin who spent a single one-year term as a member of the Wisconsin State Assembly from Milwaukee County.

== Background ==
Lavies was born in Niederdrees (now a district of Rheinbach) in the Kingdom of Prussia on August 31, 1833. He came to Wisconsin in 1844, and settled in the Town of Greenfield. He had received a common school education, and became a farmer.

== Public service ==
Lavies took over as postmaster of Root Creek in 1864, when his father Peter Lavies retired; but relinquished the office in 1867.

He had served one year as assessor for the town, three years as its treasurer, and six years as justice of the peace, when was elected to the Assembly's 11th Milwaukee County district (the Towns of Franklin, Greenfield, Lake and Oak Creek; roughly the same district his father had represented in the 1850s) in 1875, as part of the Reform Party, a short-lived coalition of Democrats, reform and Liberal Republicans, and Grangers formed in 1873, which had secured the election of one Governor of Wisconsin and a number of state legislators. He received 675 votes to 617 for Republican E. S. Estes (Republican incumbent Thomas O'Neill was not a candidate). He was assigned to the standing committee on mining and smelting.

He was not a candidate for re-election in 1876, and was succeeded by Democrat Aloysius Arnolds.

== Personal life ==
He married Barbara Eichen, and died on October 21, 1905.
