= J. C. U. Niedermann =

American politician

Johann Conrad Ulrich Niedermann (8 July 1810 – 8 October 1892) was a German-America brickmaker who served one year as a National Union Party member of the Wisconsin State Assembly from the 5th Milwaukee County assembly district (the 5th Ward of the city of Milwaukee, Wisconsin) in 1864, succeeding Democrat Peter V. Deuster. He also served as a constable, and on the Milwaukee Common Council and the Milwaukee County board of supervisors at various times in the late 1850s and early 1860s.

He was born in Bavaria. At the time of his election he was 54 years old and had been in Wisconsin for 28 years. He was assigned to the standing committee on contingent expenditures. In 1865 he was succeeded by Democrat Jared Thompson Jr.
