= New Coeln House =

Historical inn located in Wisconsin

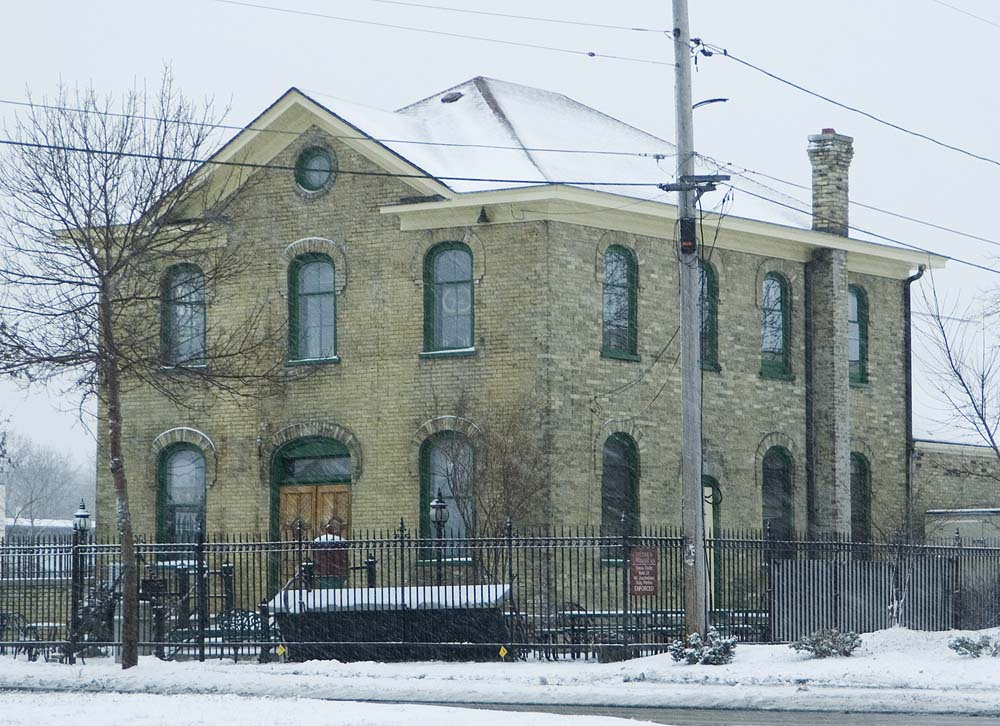
New Coeln House, still operating on the border of General Mitchell Field

The New Coeln House, also known as Deuster's Saloon and by other names, is a two-story brick Italianate-styled village inn, built between 1840 and 1850 in New Coeln, Wisconsin, which has since been annexed into Milwaukee. New Coeln was then a hamlet of German farmers, who mostly immigrated from the Rhineland. It probably initially had a tavern and living quarters downstairs and sleeping rooms upstairs. The first building, from the 1840s, functioned as a weigh station and inn for farmers traveling between Racine and Milwaukee counties.

The present-day street address is 5905 S. Howell Ave., Milwaukee, on the edge of General Mitchell International Airport (much of which was built on the former New Coeln townsite). It is Milwaukee's oldest tavern. still Since its purchase in 1983, it has operated under the name Landmark 1850 Inn. It is on the National Register of Historic Places.
