= John H. Brinkerhoff =

19th century American politician

John Hezekiah Brinkerhoff
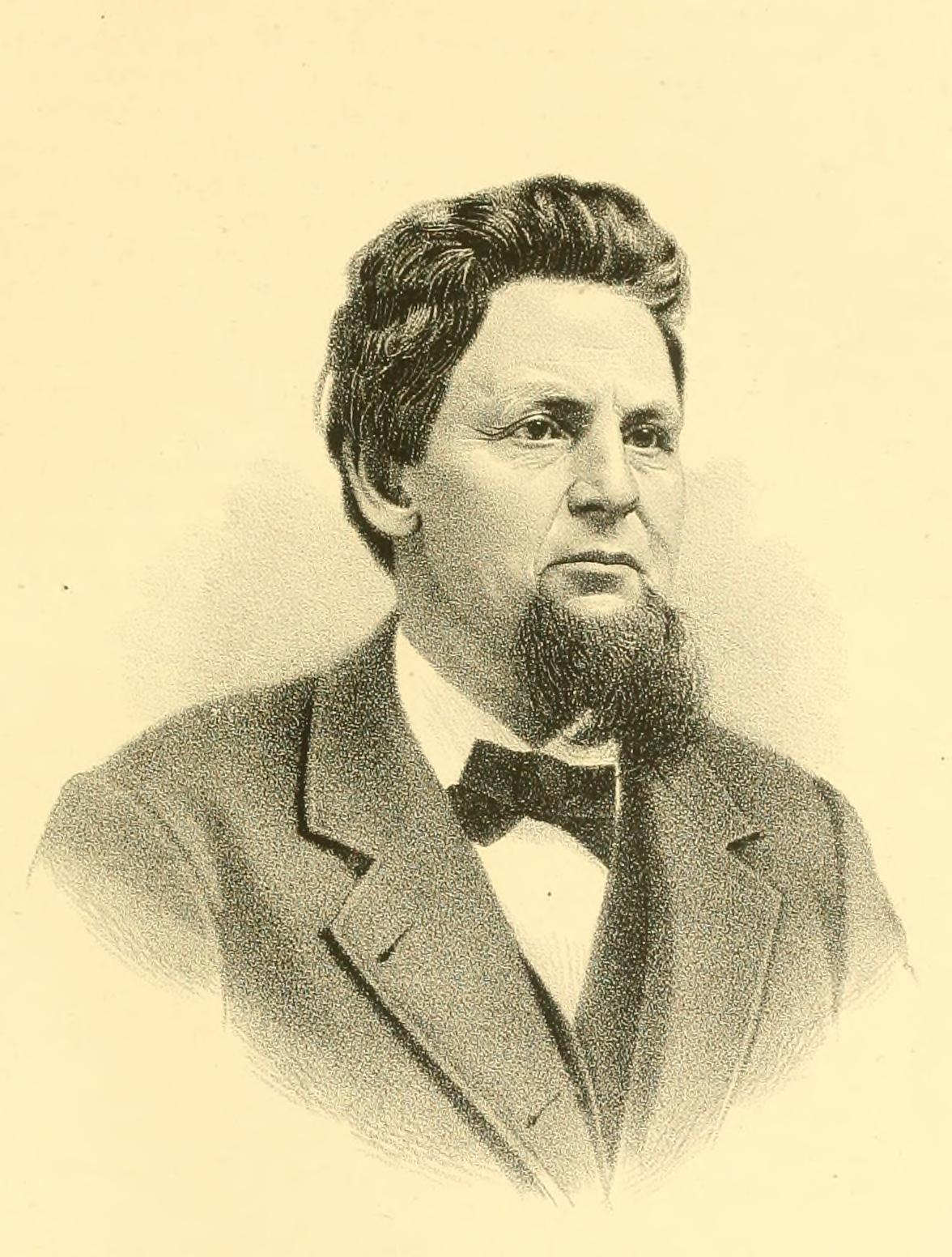
- From The History of Fond du Lac County, Wisconsin (1880)

Member of the Wisconsin State Assembly from the Fond du Lac 2nd district
- In office January 2, 1865 – January 1, 1866
- Preceded by: James McElroy
- Succeeded by: George F. Clark

Personal details
- Born: April 14, 1835 Seneca County, Ohio, U.S.
- Died: August 6, 1915 (aged 80) Waupun, Wisconsin, U.S.
- Cause of death: Stroke
- Party: Republican; Natl. Union (1863–1867)
- Spouses: Lucy T. Stoddard (died 1863); Jennie H. Gillette (m. 1867)
- Children: with Lucy Stoddard; James Edwin Brinkerhoff^{(b. 1858; died 1918)}; Edward Brinkerhoff^{(b. 1859; died young)}; Van Steenwyck Brinkerhoff^{(b. 1861; died 1880)}; Margaret Brinkerhoff^{(died young)}; with Jennie Gillette; Mary L. Brinkerhoff; Lula J. Brinkerhoff

John Hezekiah Brinkerhoff (April 14, 1835 – August 6, 1915) was an American newspaper publisher, postmaster, and Republican politician. He served in the Wisconsin State Assembly, representing Fond du Lac County, and was the publisher of the Waupun Times newspaper.

== Biography ==
John H. Brinkerhoff was born in Seneca County, Ohio, on April 14, 1835. His father died when he was a child. He went to work in a printing office in Milan, Ohio, at age 18, and subsequently worked in the printing trade in Watertown, Wisconsin, Jefferson, Wisconsin, and Beaver Dam, Wisconsin. He finally moved to Waupun, Wisconsin, in 1857, and established the Waupun Times, which he published for nine years.

Brinkerhoff became a devoted Republican after that party was established in the 1850s. In 1861, he was appointed postmaster at Waupun by President Abraham Lincoln, and served as postmaster there for the next 30 years. He was elected to the Wisconsin State Assembly in the 1864 election, running on the National Union Party ticket. He represented Fond du Lac County's 2nd Assembly district, which then comprised the southwest corner of the county.

In the 1890s he gave up his office as postmaster to his son, James Edwin Brinkerhoff, who was appointed by President Grover Cleveland. The elder Brinkerhoff, however, continued to work as assistant postmaster to his son.

In the Summer of 1915 he suffered a stroke and died a few days later at his home in Waupun.

== Personal life and family ==
John Brinkerhoff was a son of Hezekiah Brinkerhoff, who served in the Pennsylvania militia during the War of 1812. The Brinkerhoffs were descended from Dutch colonists who arrived in Pennsylvania when it was part of the New Netherland colony, in the 17th century.

John Brinkerhoff married twice. His first wife was Lucy T. Stoddard, a daughter of Theodore Stoddard of New York state. They had four children before her death in 1863; two of their children died in childhood. Brinkerhoff subsequently married Jennie H. Gillette in 1867. Gillette was a daughter of M. S. Gillette of Fond du Lac. They had at least two more children.

Wisconsin State Assembly
Preceded by James McElroy	Member of the Wisconsin State Assembly from the Fond du Lac 2nd district January 2, 1865 – January 1, 1866	Succeeded by George F. Clark
