= Milwaukee Herold =

The Milwaukee Herold was a German language daily newspaper, originally published by William Werner Coleman (1835–1888) in Milwaukee, Wisconsin beginning in 1860. It had a weekly edition for some time, which in 1918 was merged with the weekly edition of Germania to form the new Milwaukee America and became part of the publishing empire of George Brumder.
