= Jared Thompson Jr. =

19th century American politician

Jared Thompson Jr. (March 15, 1836 – October 22, 1914) was an American lawyer who served one year as a Democratic member of the Wisconsin State Assembly from the 5th Milwaukee County assembly district (the 5th Ward of the city of Milwaukee, Wisconsin) in 1865, succeeding J. C. U. Niedermann, of the National Union Party.

He was born in Vermont. At the time of his election he was 28 years old and had been in Wisconsin for 27 years. He was assigned to the standing committee on banks and banking. In 1866 he was succeeded by fellow Democrat Charles Orton.
