= Millard, Wisconsin =

- Unincorporated community
- Location within Wisconsin Location within the United States
- Coordinates: 42°44′04″N 88°37′17″W
- Country: United States
- State: Wisconsin
- County: Walworth
- Elevation: 932 ft (284 m)
- Time zone: UTC-6 (Central (CST))
  - Summer (DST): UTC-5 (CDT)
- Area code: 262
- GNIS feature ID: 1569500

Millard (also Barkers Corners) is an unincorporated community located in the town of Sugar Creek, Walworth County, Wisconsin, United States.

== Notable people ==
- Thomas Davis, Wisconsin politician, lived in Millard.
