= Tibbets, Wisconsin =

- Unincorporated community
- Location within Wisconsin Location within the United States
- Coordinates: 42°44′05″N 88°34′53″W
- Country: United States
- State: Wisconsin
- County: Walworth
- Elevation: 938 ft (286 m)
- Time zone: UTC-6 (Central (CST))
  - Summer (DST): UTC-5 (CDT)
- Area code: 262
- GNIS feature ID: 1575433

Tibbets (also Kendalls Corner, Tibbet, or Tibbits) is an unincorporated community located in the town of Sugar Creek, Walworth County, Wisconsin, United States. The Sugar Creek Town Hall is in the community.
