= Sugar Creek, Wisconsin =

Town of Sugar Creek, Wisconsin
- Town
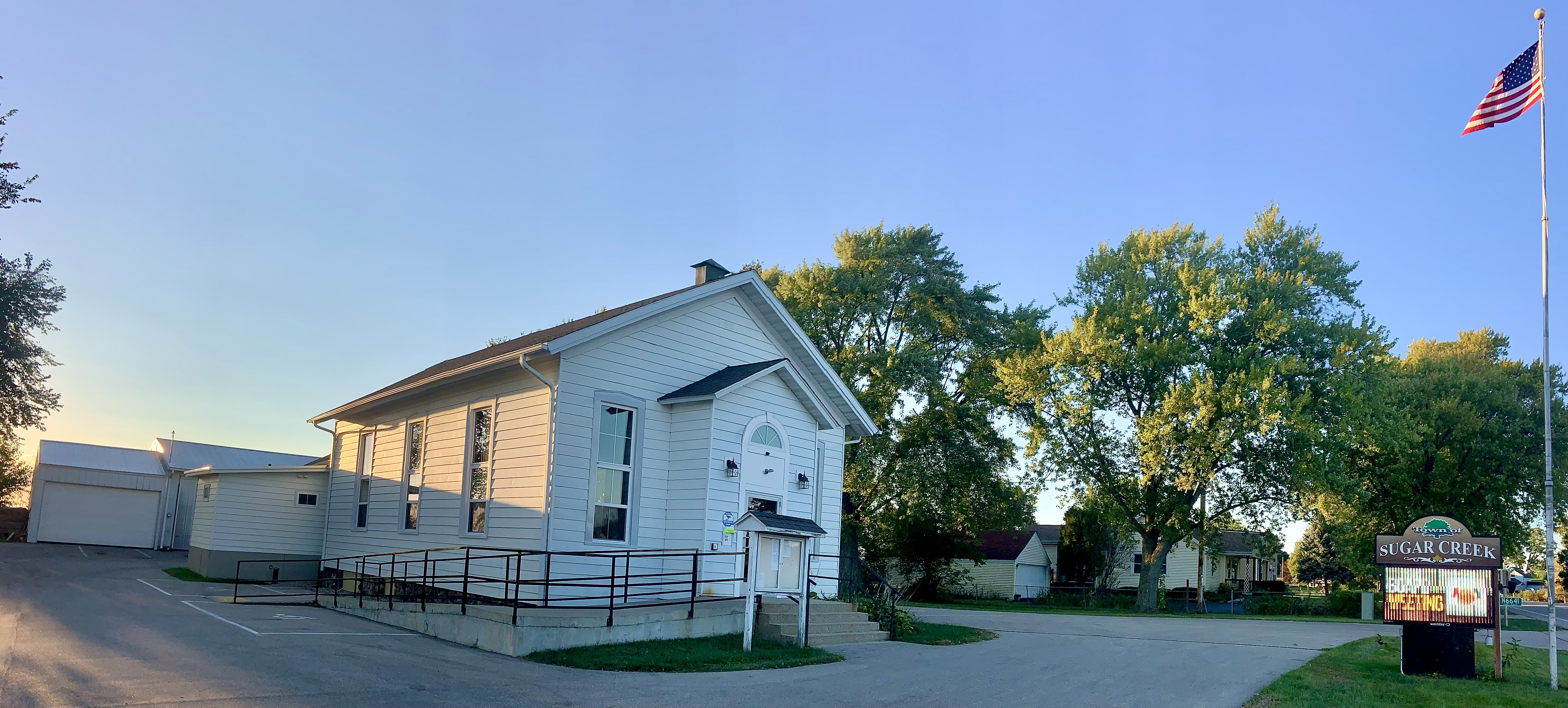
- Town hall

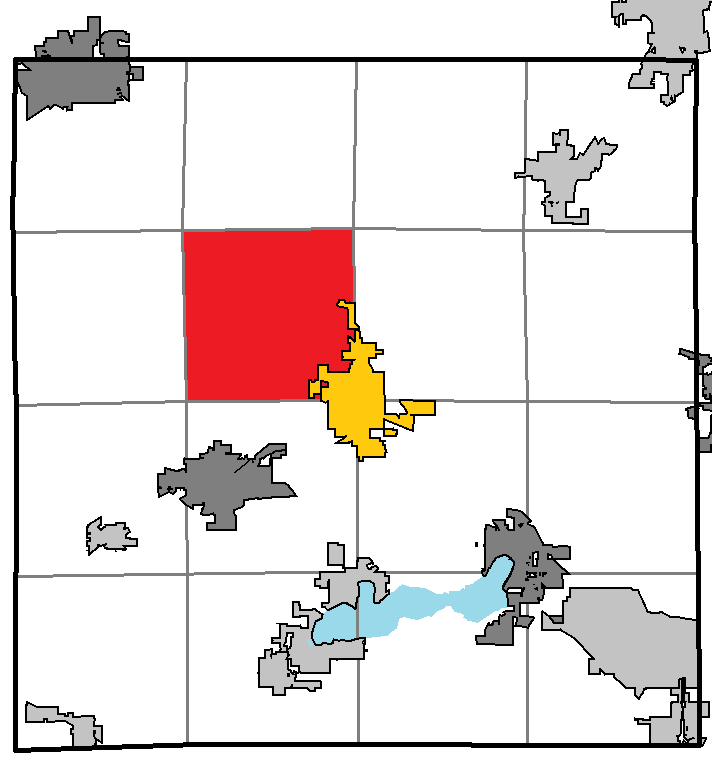
- Location of Sugar Creek, within Walworth County

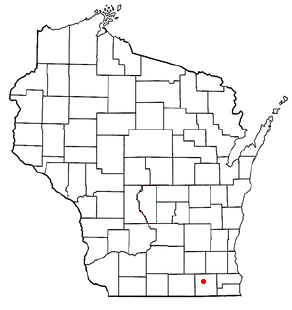
- Location of the Town of Sugar Creek, Wisconsin
- Coordinates: 42°43′58″N 88°35′12″W
- Country: United States
- State: Wisconsin
- County: Walworth

Area
  - Total: 33.7 sq mi (87.4 km^{2})
  - Land: 33.0 sq mi (85.4 km^{2})
  - Water: 0.77 sq mi (2.0 km^{2})
- Elevation: 906 ft (276 m)

Population (2020)
  - Total: 3,902
  - Density: 100/sq mi (39/km^{2})
- Time zone: UTC-6 (Central (CST))
  - Summer (DST): UTC-5 (CDT)
- Area code: 262
- FIPS code: 55-78100
- GNIS feature ID: 1584244

Sugar Creek is a town in Walworth County, Wisconsin, United States. The population was 3,902 at the 2020 census. The unincorporated communities of Millard and Tibbets are located in the town. The unincorporated community of Abells Corners is also located partially in the town.

== Geography ==
According to the United States Census Bureau, the town has a total area of 33.7 square miles (87.4 km^{2}), of which 33.0 square miles (85.4 km^{2}) is land and 0.8 square mile (2.0 km^{2}) (2.31%) is water.

== Demographics ==
As of the census of 2000, there were 3,331 people, 1,197 households, and 942 families residing in the town. The population density was 101.1 people per square mile (39.0/km^{2}). There were 1,347 housing units at an average density of 40.9 per square mile (15.8/km^{2}). The racial makeup of the town was 97.30% White, 0.12% African American, 0.15% Native American, 0.42% Asian, 0.96% from other races, and 1.05% from two or more races. Hispanic or Latino of any race were 2.67% of the population.

There were 1,197 households, out of which 38.6% had children under the age of 18 living with them, 68.7% were married couples living together, 5.8% had a female householder with no husband present, and 21.3% were non-families. 17.5% of all households were made up of individuals, and 6.5% had someone living alone who was 65 years of age or older. The average household size was 2.77 and the average family size was 3.13.

In the town, the population was spread out, with 28.4% under the age of 18, 4.7% from 18 to 24, 30.5% from 25 to 44, 25.8% from 45 to 64, and 10.6% who were 65 years of age or older. The median age was 38 years. For every 100 females, there were 106.3 males. For every 100 females age 18 and over, there were 105.3 males.

The median income for a household in the town was $51,161, and the median income for a family was $56,333. Males had a median income of $38,889 versus $26,856 for females. The per capita income for the town was $21,737. About 4.5% of families and 5.3% of the population were below the poverty line, including 7.9% of those under age 18 and 3.2% of those age 65 or over.

== Notable people ==
- Thomas Davis, Wisconsin politician, lived in the town
- Perry G. Harrington, Wisconsin politician, lived in the town
- D. Manfield Stearns, Wisconsin politician, lived in the town
- Donald Stewart, Wisconsin politician, lived in the town
- Edgar Wilcox, Wisconsin politician, lived in the town

== External Sources ==
- Town of Sugar Creek, Wisconsin
