= Root Creek, Wisconsin =

Ghost town in Wisconsin

Root Creek
- Hamlet (Defunct)
- Etymology: Named after the Root River (formerly Root Creek)
- Interactive map of Root Creek
- Coordinates: 42.9789°N 87.9986°W
- Country: United States
- State: Wisconsin
- County: Milwaukee
- Town: Greenfield
- Established: c. 1840s

Population (1887)
  - Total: 129

Root Creek was a hamlet in Sections 21–22 and 27–28 of the Town of Greenfield in Milwaukee County, Wisconsin, United States, on the Milwaukee-Janesville plank road, at what is now roughly the intersection of that thoroughfare (now Forest Home Avenue) and 68th Street. The body of water after which it was named is nowadays referred to as the Root River.

== History ==
The post office there was established August 19, 1847, near the eastern bank of Root Creek. When Peter Lavies became postmaster in 1854, soon after the establishment of the Hales Corners post office just on the other side of the river, he moved it northeastward to a site adjacent to his tavern, at what is now the junction of South 76th Street, Forest Home Avenue, and Cold Spring Road. In 1846, a Lutheran church was built named Evangelisch-Lutherische St. Johannes-Gemeinde zu Root Creek, Wis. (St. John Evangelical Lutheran Church of Root Creek, Wisconsin). By 1848 there were four churches, and the area became a nucleus for a few businesses catering to the nearby farming community, almost all German Americans and Irish Americans.

The office of postmaster was held from 1864 to 1867 by Hubert Lavies (later a state legislator), son of Peter Lavies. The post office itself moved with changes in postmaster, with the final location being at the intersection of what are now Howard and Forest Home Avenues, across the road from Honey Creek. In 1887 the population of the service area of the post office was estimated at 129.

The post office was finally discontinued May 31, 1908. The Root Creek Farmers and Gardeners Exhibit, later to become simply known as the Root Creek Fair, started in fall of 1914, and continued on through 1939. The nearby District #10 public school would be known as "Root Creek School" from 1915 until 1943, when it was renamed MacArthur School after Douglas MacArthur. St. John Evangelical continued to use the name "Root Creek" for the nearby community through its centennial celebration and history book.

By 1957, the area formerly known as Root Creek had been divided among five municipalities, and portions of the region once served by a single post office would be assigned to seven different zip codes. Only a handful of abandoned cemeteries such as Lavies Cemetery remain.
