= Charles F. Freeman =

American politician

Charles F. Freeman (June 20, 1832 – April 24, 1915) was an American businessman and politician.

Freeman was born in Corydon, McKean County, Pennsylvania. He went to the McKean County public schools. In 1857, Freeman moved to Milwaukee, Wisconsin and was a commission merchant. He was involved with the Milwaukee Chamber of Commerce. Freeman served on the Milwaukee school board and was a Democrat. He served in the Wisconsin Assembly in 1871 and 1880. Freeman died in Milwaukee, Wisconsin from a long illness.
