= George Brumder =

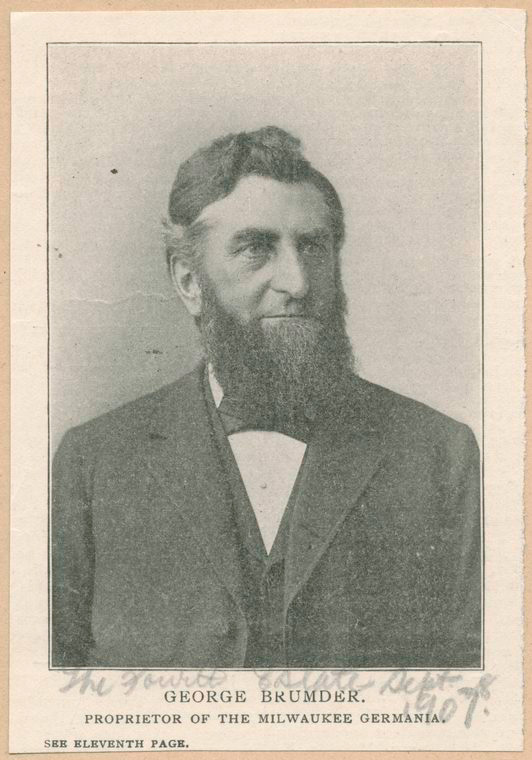
George Brumder, proprietor of the Milwaukee Germania.

George Brumder (May 24, 1839 – May 9, 1910) was a German-American newspaper publisher and businessman in Milwaukee, Wisconsin. Born in Breuschwickersheim, Bas-Rhin, France, Brumder emigrated to the United States, settling in Milwaukee, where he established the largest publishing company of German-American materials in the United States.

== Background and marriage ==
Brumder was the fifteenth of sixteen children born to Georg and Christina Brumder. In 1857, at the age of 18, he immigrated to Wisconsin with his older sister, Anna Maria, to attend her wedding to a Lutheran minister, Gottlieb Reim. George's first employment was clearing land near Helenville, Wisconsin, though shortly after arriving in the United States, he bade his sister and new brother-in-law farewell and set off on foot on a 45-mile journey to Milwaukee. He became a member of a crew that laid Milwaukee's first street car tracks and later became the foreman of the crew—a fact he remained proud of throughout his life. Brumder soon joined Grace Lutheran Church in Milwaukee where he met his future wife, Henriette Brandhorst, a Prussian immigrant who was born in 1841 and arrived in America in 1869.

The two were married on July 16, 1864, and they invested what little money they had in a small bookstore George had opened a few months earlier at 306 W. Water Street.

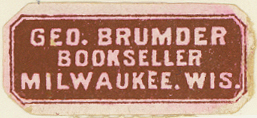
A trade label for Geo. Brumder Bookseller

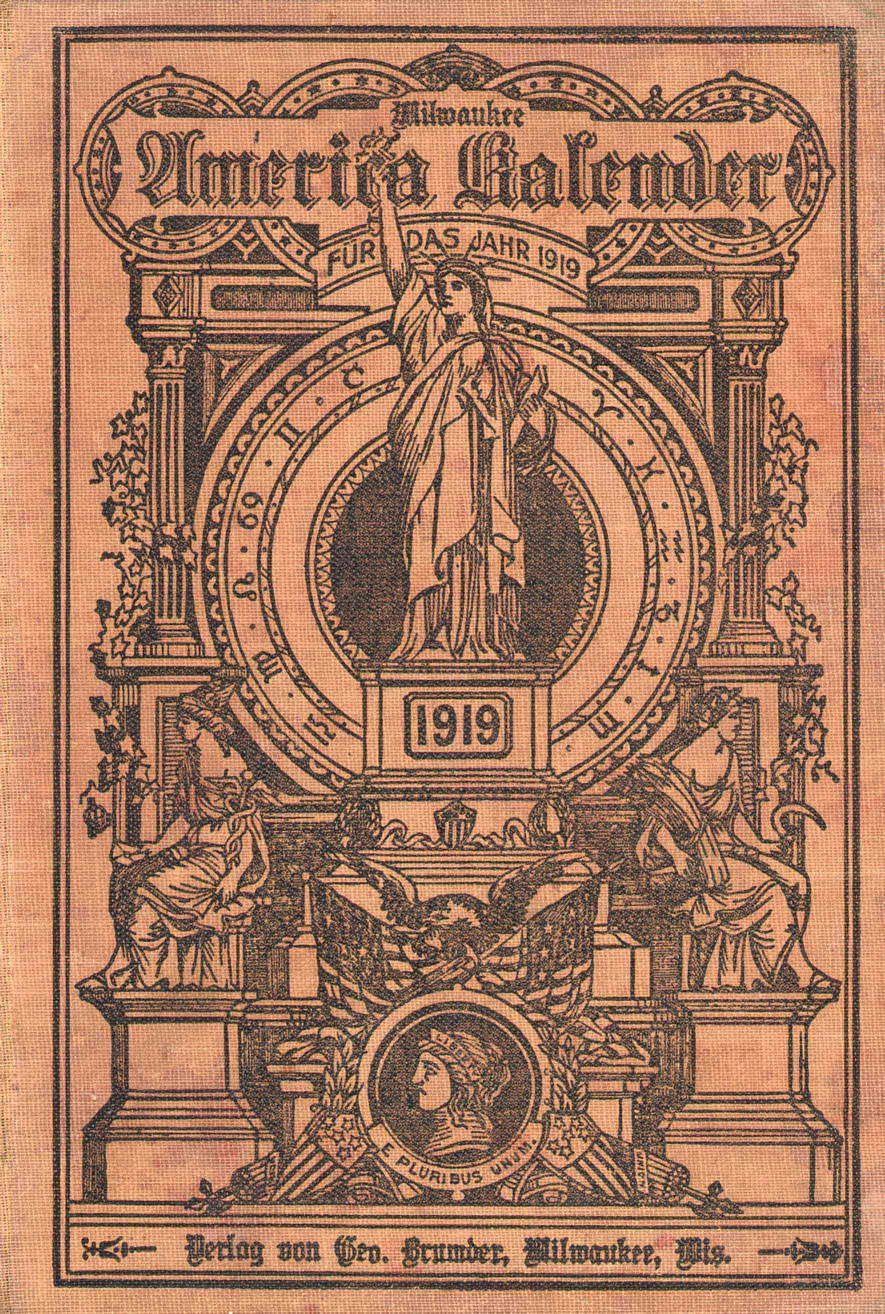
Cover of a 1919 Almanac published by the George Brumder Company nine years after Brumder's death.

== Branching into publishing ==
As the bookstore flourished, the Brumders added a small printing department and book bindery and began publishing books for the Lutheran Church, especially the Wisconsin Synod. Around the same time, a group of prominent German immigrants formed the German Protestant Publishing Company and selected the name Germania for the name of their first publication, a weekly and daily newspaper. That venture ran into financial difficulty owing to cost overruns and limited circulation and the group sought Brumder's assistance. Under his stewardship, the publication eventually thrived. Brumder bought out controlling interest in the company in 1874. In 1897, Brumder bought the Milwaukee daily Abend-Post and the weekly Sontags Journal and changed the name of Germania to Germania Abend-Post. Brumder acquired several other papers over the years including the Lincoln Freie Presse (1904) and the daily Milwaukee Herold (1906). His company eventually controlled most of Milwaukee's German language newspapers and also owned German papers in Chicago and Lincoln, Nebraska, and several other Wisconsin communities. He was also president of the Germania National Bank (1903–1910) and of the Concordia Fire Insurance Company (1897–1909).

== Germania Building ==
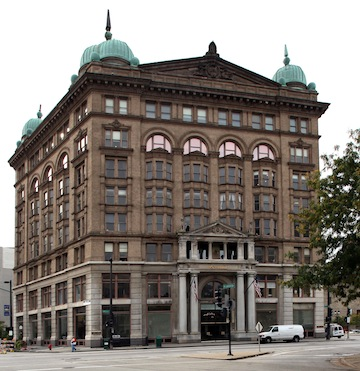
Germania Building

In 1896, Brumder built a new headquarters for his growing publishing empire at 135 W. Wells St. The eight-story Germania Building, as it was called, was designed by German-trained architects Schnetzky & Liebert and at the time of its construction was the largest office building in the city of Milwaukee. In 1918, the building's name was changed to the Brumder Building in response to anti-German sentiment during World War I but was changed back to the Germania Building after a significant renovation in 1981. Seventeen years after Brumder's 1910 death, the printing presses were removed from the basement levels of the building, giving the city its first underground parking garage. The Beaux-Arts/Classical Revival building was placed on the National Register of Historic Places in 1983.

== Personal life, death and tributes ==
The Brumders had eleven children, seven of whom survived them: Amalie Christine (1865), Ida Johanna (1867), William Charles (1868), Emma Dorothea (1870), Alfred William (1871) (died at four and a half months), Alfred Julius (1874), Henriette Mathilda (1875) (died at two and a half months), Ella (1876) (died at one month), George Fredrick (1878), Herman Otto (1880), and Herbert Paul (1885).

Brumder died unexpectedly at the age of 71 on May 9, 1910, from a brain hemorrhage. He is buried at Forest Home Cemetery in Milwaukee.

Brumder's business and social contributions to Milwaukee, to Wisconsin, and to the United States were signified in part by several conferences with President William McKinley when he was in Milwaukee, a meeting with President Theodore Roosevelt at the White House, and dinner with President William Howard Taft at the White House. Upon his death, his wife received letters of condolence from President Taft and many leading officials and citizens of the country, and the flag at Milwaukee City Hall was flown at half-staff.
