= Hugh Reynolds (American politician) =

American politician

Hugh P. Reynolds was an American merchant from Milwaukee who served two years as a Democratic member of the Wisconsin State Senate from the 6th District in Milwaukee County.

== Senate service ==
Reynolds was elected for the 1864 session of the Senate, succeeding fellow Democrat Edward Keogh, to represent the Sixth District (the 3rd, 4th, 5th, and 6th Wards of Milwaukee, and the Towns of Wauwatosa, Greenfield, Lake, Oak Creek and Franklin), at which time he is described as a merchant, born in Michigan and living in Milwaukee, who had lived in Wisconsin for 25 of his 26 years of life (he was the youngest member of the Senate of 1864, as Keogh had been before him). He was assigned to the standing committees on roads, bridges and ferries; and on enrolled bills. He was re-elected for 1865, remaining on Roads, Bridges and Ferries, but switching to the committee on benevolent institutions; he was one of only six Wisconsin state senators (out of 33) to vote against ratifying the Thirteenth Amendment to the United States Constitution.

Reynolds was succeeded in 1866 by War Democrat Charles H. Larkin.

== Personal life ==
Reynolds was born in Michigan, the son of Richard and Christina Reynolds (both born in Ireland). On September 26, 1872, in Milwaukee, he married Mary Frances Wilson, in an Episcopalian ceremony.
