= G. DeWitt Elwood =

19th century American politician

Member of the Wisconsin Senate from the 29th district
- In office January 2, 1865 – January 7, 1867
- Preceded by: Charles S. Kelsey
- Succeeded by: Henry G. Webb

Register of Deeds of Green Lake County, Wisconsin
- In office May 12, 1858 – January 1, 1865
- Preceded by: Position established
- Succeeded by: Clark A. Millard

Register of Deeds of Marquette County, Wisconsin
- In office January 1, 1857 – May 12, 1858
- Preceded by: J. E. Millard
- Succeeded by: Lorenzo Padgham

Personal details
- Born: May 23, 1818 Minden, New York, U.S.
- Died: March 31, 1868 (aged 49) St. Marie, Wisconsin, U.S.
- Cause of death: Tuberculosis
- Resting place: Oakwood Cemetery, Berlin, Wisconsin
- Party: Republican; Natl. Union (1860s); Whig (before 1854)
- Spouse: Sarah Jeannette DeForest (m. 1849–1868)
- Children: Ella M. Elwood^{(b. 1853; died 1858)}; Eugene Cornelius Elwood^{(b. 1854; died 1957)}; Eva J. Elwood^{(b. 1856; died 1862)}; Dewitt Elwood^{(b. 1868; died 1952)}
- Occupation: Farmer

Gasharee DeWitt Elwood (May 23, 1818 – March 31, 1868) was an American educator, Republican politician, and Wisconsin pioneer. He was a member of the Wisconsin Senate, representing the 29th Senate district during the 1865 and 1866 legislative sessions. In historical documents, his last name is sometimes spelled Ellwood. His given names were generally always abbreviated as G. DeWitt or G. DeW.

== Biography ==
G. DeWitt Elwood was born May 23, 1818, at Minden, New York. His father died when he was only about two years old. He was raised working on the family farm with his mother and siblings, attended the common schools, and when he was able began earning money as a teacher.

He used his earnings to pay for his admission to the Cazenovia Seminary and Fairfield Academy, but had to quit before his final year due to severe inflammation in his eyes. Instead he returned to work as a teacher, supplementing his income as a farm laborer.

In September 1849, he came west to Wisconsin. Unlike many early settlers, Elwood stated that his main reason for migrating was to seek a better climate for his health. He arrived at the port of Milwaukee and quickly settled at what is now the town of St. Marie, Green Lake County, Wisconsin. At the time, the area was still part of Marquette County. After arriving in Wisconsin, Elwood again worked as a teacher. Elwood was motivated by the cause of education and was also active in the temperance movement, establishing one of the first temperance clubs in central Wisconsin.

Elwood soon became involved in local politics, first with the Whig Party and then with its successor, the Republican Party. He was elected county surveyor (of Marquette County), justice of the peace, and superintendent of schools. In 1856, he was elected register of deeds of Marquette County. Two years later, Green Lake County was established from the eastern half of Marquette County, and Elwood was elected the first register of deeds of Green Lake County. He ultimately served two more terms as register of deeds, leaving office in January 1865. During his last two years as register, he also served as deputy county treasurer.

In 1860, Elwood, as register of deeds of Green Lake County, found himself at the center of a legal battle over the status of the nearby town and city of Ripon. An 1859 act of the legislature had proposed detaching Ripon from Fond du Lac County and attaching it instead to Green Lake County, and proposed a referendum in Fond du Lac to approve the change. The referendum was tainted by inconsistent ballot language around the county, and both sides claimed victory. In the immediate aftermath, Elwood received an application to record a deed which was located in Ripon and he refused on the grounds that it was not part of Green Lake County. He was sued by the property owner, Benjamin Spaulding, in a case that rose to the Wisconsin Supreme Court and was argued by some of the leading attorneys in the state. For Spaulding, former Wisconsin Supreme Court justices Samuel Crawford and Abram D. Smith, and future congressman Edward S. Bragg. For Elwood, future chief justice of the Wisconsin Supreme Court Edward George Ryan. The case received such attention because of the political and financial interests involved in the status of Ripon. Ultimately, the Wisconsin Supreme Court found in favor of Elwood and against the separation of Ripon from Fond du Lac, ruling that the language of the act was technically deficient and the subsequent ballot inconsistency made the referendum invalid.

In 1864, rather than running for another term as register of deeds, he became the National Union Party nominee for Wisconsin Senate in the 29th Senate district. At the time, his district comprised all of Green Lake and Marquette counties. He won the election and went on to serve in the 1865 and 1866 legislative sessions, where he was member and then chairman of the Senate committee on education. Elwood was well respected by his colleagues, and after the 1865 session was given the important role of implementing the controversial sale and settlement of swamp lands granted to the state by the federal government. The federal government had allowed states to reclaim this land by an 1850 act of congress, but in Wisconsin the situation had languished due to controversy over how to fairly claim and dispose of the lands and how to distribute the proceeds. Through his influence, half the state proceeds from the swamp lands were allocated to a new "normal school fund" which funded several of the "normal schools" around the state which much later would become campuses of the University of Wisconsin.

Elwood suffered his entire life from asthma, in 1868 this condition was exacerbated by tuberculosis. He died of the disease at his home in St. Marie on March 31, 1868.

== Personal life and family ==
G. DeWitt Elwood was the fourth of five children born to Richard P. Elwood and his wife Elisabeth (née Van Camp). Elwood's ancestry was a mix of English, German, French, and Swiss.

G. DeWitt Elwood married Sarah Jeannette DeForest in July 1849. They had four children together, though two died in childhood.

Wisconsin Senate
| Preceded by Charles S. Kelsey | Member of the Wisconsin Senate from the 29th district January 2, 1865 – January 7, 1867 | Succeeded by Henry G. Webb |
Political offices
| Preceded by J. E. Millard | Register of Deeds of Marquette County, Wisconsin; January 1, 1857 – May 12, 1858 | Succeeded by Lorenzo Padgham |
| New county government | Register of Deeds of Green Lake County, Wisconsin; May 12, 1858 – January 1, 1865 | Succeeded by Clark A. Millard |
