= Sumner, Trempealeau County, Wisconsin =

Sumner, Wisconsin
- Town
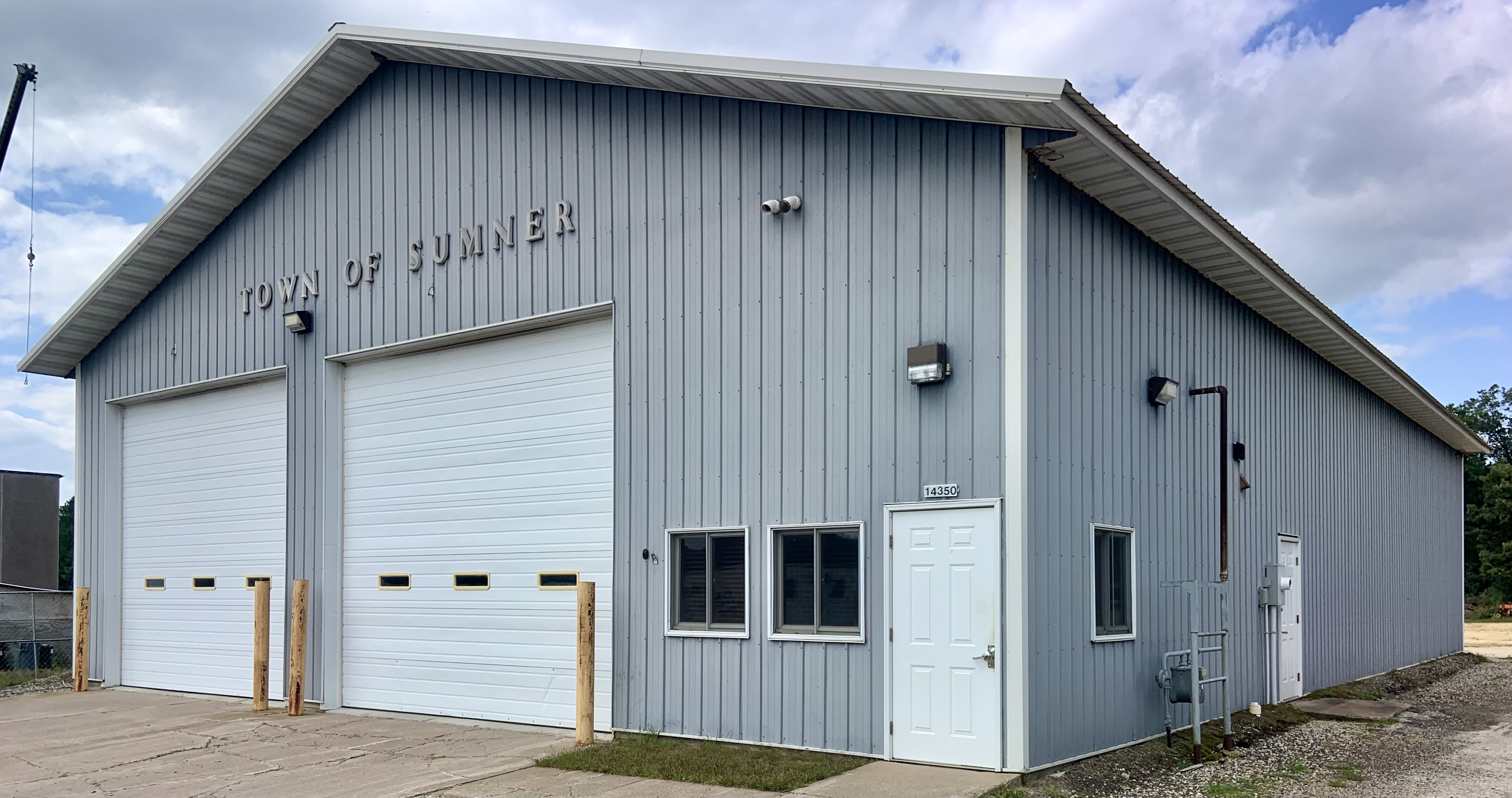
- Town hall in Osseo

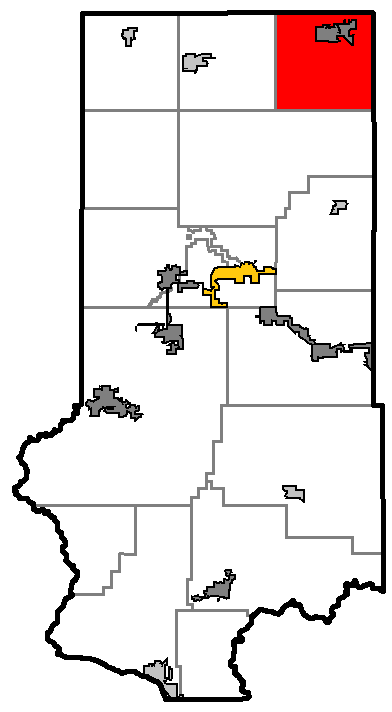
- Location of Sumner, Trempealeau County, Wisconsin

- Location of Trempealeau County, Wisconsin
- Coordinates: 44°34′23″N 91°13′15″W
- Country: United States
- State: Wisconsin
- County: Trempealeau

Area
  - Total: 33.9 sq mi (87.8 km^{2})
  - Land: 33.9 sq mi (87.7 km^{2})
  - Water: 0.039 sq mi (0.1 km^{2})
- Elevation: 994 ft (303 m)

Population (2020)
  - Total: 840
  - Density: 25/sq mi (9.6/km^{2})
- Time zone: UTC-6 (Central (CST))
  - Summer (DST): UTC-5 (CDT)
- FIPS code: 55-78500
- GNIS feature ID: 1584253
- Website: https://www.townofsumnerwi.com/

Sumner is a town in Trempealeau County, Wisconsin, United States. The population was 840 at the 2020 census.

== History ==
The town was named for Charles Sumner, a politician who was a U.S. Senator from Massachusetts and ally of Abraham Lincoln.

== Geography ==
According to the United States Census Bureau, the town has a total area of 33.9 square miles (87.7 km^{2}), of which 33.8 square miles (87.7 km^{2}) is land and 0.04 square mile (0.1 km^{2}) (0.09%) is water.

== Demographics ==
As of the census of 2000, there were 806 people, 291 households, and 229 families residing in the town. The population density was 23.8 people per square mile (9.2/km^{2}). There were 305 housing units at an average density of 9.0 per square mile (3.5/km^{2}). The racial makeup of the town was 99.88% White and 0.12% Native American.

There were 291 households, out of which 35.4% had children under the age of 18 living with them, 67.7% were married couples living together, 6.9% had a female householder with no husband present, and 21.0% were non-families. 16.5% of all households were made up of individuals, and 8.2% had someone living alone who was 65 years of age or older. The average household size was 2.77 and the average family size was 3.12.

The population was 28.3% under the age of 18, 5.5% from 18 to 24, 27.8% from 25 to 44, 26.1% from 45 to 64, and 12.4% who were 65 years of age or older. The median age was 38 years. For every 100 females, there were 102.0 males. For every 100 females age 18 and over, there were 98.6 males.

The median income for a household in the town was $46,875, and the median income for a family was $51,923. Males had a median income of $30,294 versus $19,306 for females. The per capita income for the town was $18,405. About 0.4% of families and 3.7% of the population were below the poverty line, including 3.4% of those under age 18 and 7.8% of those age 65 or over.
