= Elihu Goodsell =

American politician

Elihu Bernard Goodsell (May 11, 1806 – November 17, 1878) was an American farmer, miner, and politician.

Born in Sheldon, Vermont, he went to Quincy, Illinois, and then to Mineral Point, Michigan Territory in 1834. He was the first settler of Highland (village), Iowa County, Wisconsin and helped found the community in 1845. He was the postmaster and had farming and mining businesses. Goodsell served in the first Wisconsin Constitution Convention of 1846 as a Democrat. He then served in the Wisconsin State Assembly in 1865 and 1866. Goodsell died in Highland, Wisconsin, in 1878.
