= David Vance (politician) =

American politician

David Vance (February 19, 1836 – October 9, 1912) was an American shipmaster and politician.

Vance was born on February 19, 1836, in Belfast, Ireland. Three months later, Vance moved with his family to Jefferson County, New York. In 1854, he settled in Milwaukee, Wisconsin. He was a shipmaster on the Great Lakes and later was in the vessel brokerage and marine insurance business. Vance was a member of the Wisconsin State Assembly during the 1876 and 1877 sessions. He was a Republican. Vance died in his home in Milwaukee, Wisconsin on October 9, 1912, from complications due to a broken hip.
