= Thomas Davis (Wisconsin politician) =

American politician

Thomas Davis (October 8, 1817 – August 30, 1908) was a member of the Wisconsin State Assembly from 1865 to 1866. He was born in Enosburgh, Vermont and resided in Millard and Sugar Creek, Wisconsin.
