= Highland, Iowa County, Wisconsin =

Highland, Wisconsin
- Town
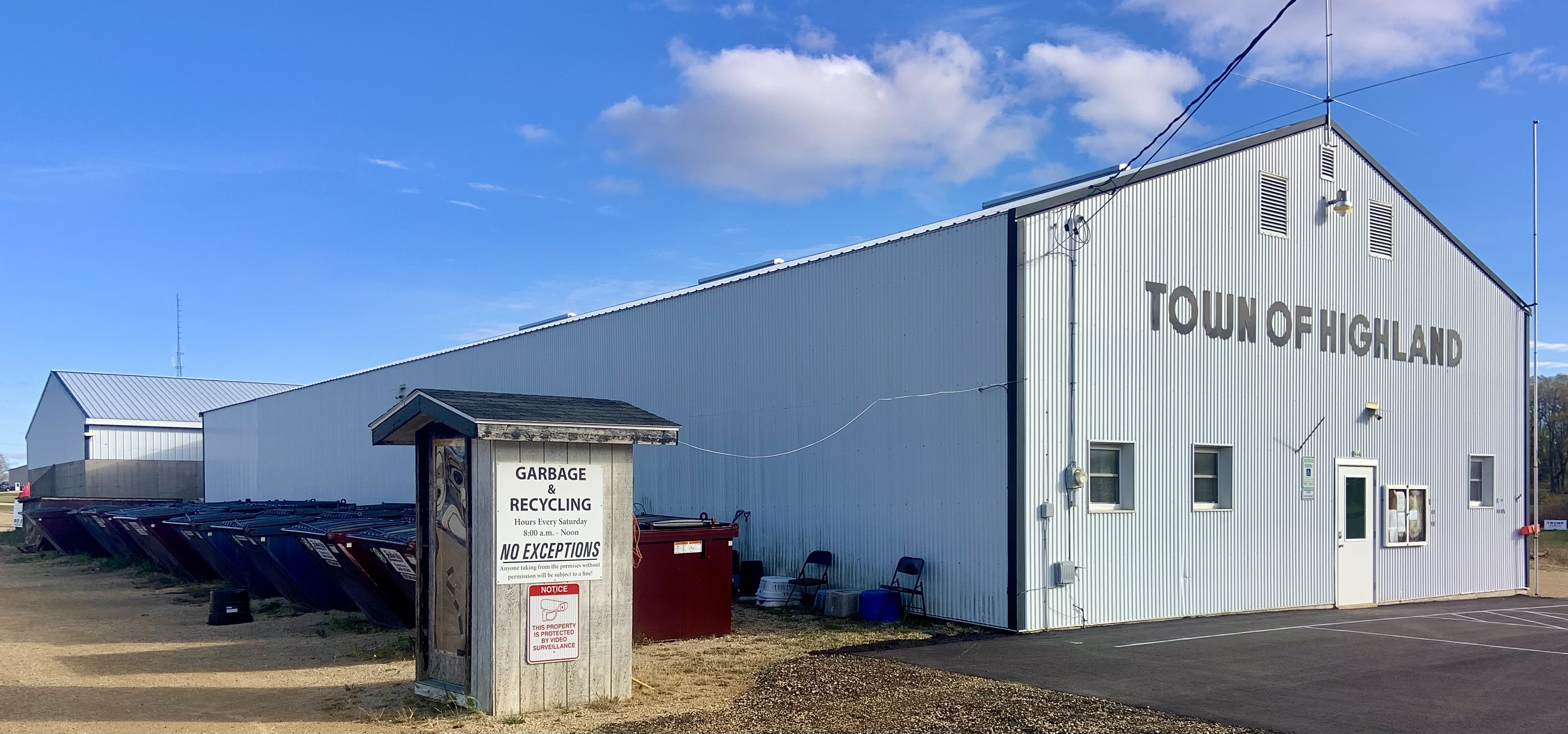
- Town hall

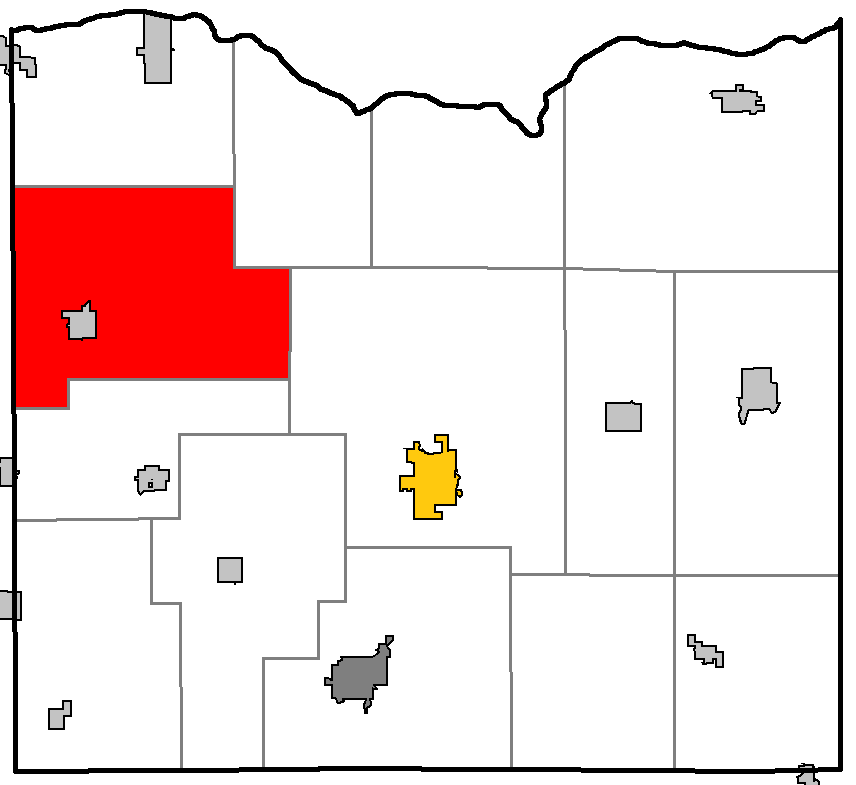
- Location of Highland, within Iowa County, Wisconsin

- Location of Iowa County, Wisconsin
- Coordinates: 43°2′41″N 90°20′5″W
- Country: United States
- State: Wisconsin
- County: Iowa

Area
  - Total: 64.9 sq mi (168.0 km^{2})
  - Land: 64.6 sq mi (167.4 km^{2})
  - Water: 0.23 sq mi (0.6 km^{2})
- Elevation: 1,112 ft (339 m)

Population (2020)
  - Total: 724
  - Density: 11.2/sq mi (4.32/km^{2})
- Time zone: UTC-6 (Central (CST))
  - Summer (DST): UTC-5 (CDT)
- Area code: 608
- FIPS code: 55-34475
- GNIS feature ID: 1583388
- Website: https://townofhighlandiowacowi.gov/

Highland is a town in Iowa County, Wisconsin, United States. The population was 724 at the 2020 census. The village of Highland is located within the town.

== Geography ==
According to the United States Census Bureau, the town has a total area of 64.9 square miles (168.0 km^{2}), of which 64.7 square miles (167.4 km^{2}) is land and 0.2 square mile (0.5 km^{2}) (0.32%) is water.

== Demographics ==
As of the census of 2000, there were 797 people, 278 households, and 224 families residing in the town. The population density was 12.3 people per square mile (4.8/km^{2}). There were 332 housing units at an average density of 5.1 per square mile (2.0/km^{2}). The racial makeup of the town was 99.00% White, 0.13% Native American, 0.13% Pacific Islander, and 0.75% from two or more races. 0.00% of the population were Hispanic or Latino of any race.

There were 278 households, out of which 37.8% had children under the age of 18 living with them, 68.3% were married couples living together, 5.4% had a female householder with no husband present, and 19.4% were non-families. 16.2% of all households were made up of individuals, and 6.5% had someone living alone who was 65 years of age or older. The average household size was 2.85 and the average family size was 3.21.

In the town, the population was spread out, with 28.7% under the age of 18, 5.1% from 18 to 24, 28.9% from 25 to 44, 24.2% from 45 to 64, and 13.0% who were 65 years of age or older. The median age was 38 years. For every 100 females, there were 109.7 males. For every 100 females age 18 and over, there were 112.7 males.

The median income for a household in the town was $37,868, and the median income for a family was $43,056. Males had a median income of $25,278 versus $22,115 for females. The per capita income for the town was $17,361. About 5.0% of families and 6.8% of the population were below the poverty line, including 4.4% of those under age 18 and 10.5% of those age 65 or over.

== Notable people ==
- Walter J. Dolan, Wisconsin State Representative
- Richard Kennedy, Wisconsin State Representative
