= James Riordan (Wisconsin politician) =

American politician

James Riordan was an American from Franklin, Wisconsin who served a single one-year term in 1861 as a Democratic member of the Wisconsin State Assembly.
