= Wyman Lincoln =

American politician

Wyman L. Lincoln (17 January 1828, Newfane, Vermont – 1 February 1894, Chinook, Montana) was a member of the Wisconsin State Senate during the 1865 and 1866 sessions. Lincoln represented the 15th District and was affiliated with the National Union Party. Born in Vermont as the son of Amasa Lincoln and Lucy Richardson, he married Harriet Gracia Ingraham (1832–1920) there around 1848. The family moved to Avoca, Wisconsin between 1850 and 1859. In 1878, President Hayes appointed "Major Lincoln" Indian Agent at Fort Belknap Agency, Montana, for which he moved his family to Blaine County. While he was agent, the Fort Belknap Agency and its 2,000 Gros Ventre and Assiniboine inhabitants were moved 20 miles East from a region south of Chinook, Montana to the current region south of Harlem, Montana.
