= 25th Wisconsin Legislature =

Wisconsin legislative term for 1872

←	24th	26th	→
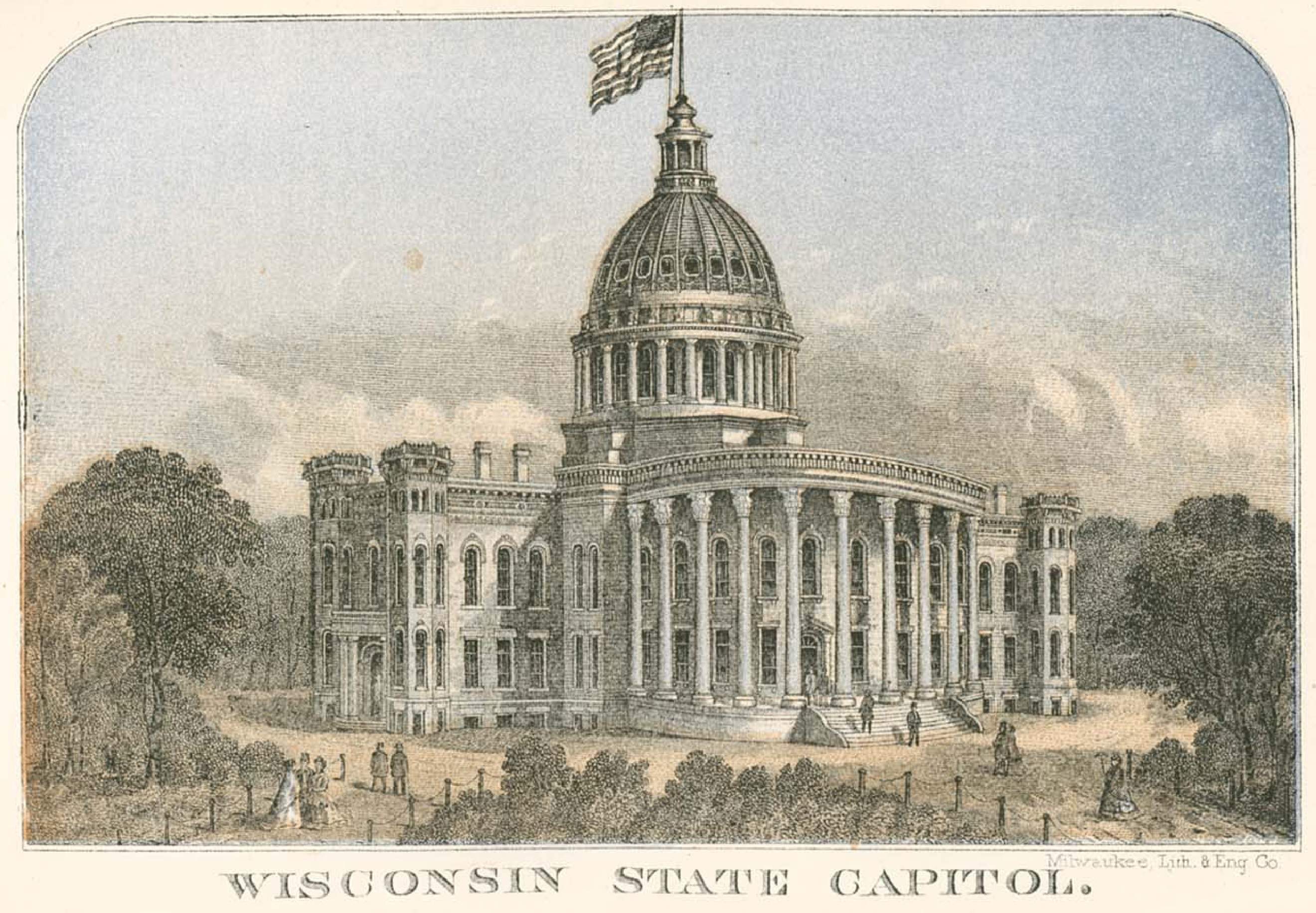
- Wisconsin State Capitol, 1863

Overview
- Legislative body: Wisconsin Legislature
- Meeting place: Wisconsin State Capitol
- Term: January 1, 1872 – January 6, 1873
- Election: November 7, 1871

Senate
- Members: 33
- Senate President: Milton Pettit (R)
- President pro tempore: Charles G. Williams (R)
- Party control: Republican

Assembly
- Members: 100
- Assembly Speaker: Daniel Hall (R)
- Party control: Republican

Sessions
- 1st: January 10, 1872 – March 26, 1872

The Twenty-Fifth Wisconsin Legislature convened from January 10, 1872, to March 26, 1872, in regular session.

This was the first legislative session after the redistricting of the Senate and Assembly according to an act of the previous session.

Senators representing even-numbered districts were newly elected for this session and were serving the first year of a two-year term. Assembly members were elected to a one-year term. Assembly members and even-numbered senators were elected in the general election of November 7, 1871. Senators representing odd-numbered districts were serving the second year of their two-year term, having been elected in the general election held on November 8, 1870.

The governor of Wisconsin during this entire term was Republican Cadwallader C. Washburn, of La Crosse County, serving the first year of a two-year term, having won election in the 1871 Wisconsin gubernatorial election.

== Major events ==
- January 1, 1872: Inauguration of Cadwallader C. Washburn as 11th Governor of Wisconsin.
- March 1, 1872: Yellowstone National Park was established as the first national park.
- May 22, 1872: President Ulysses S. Grant signed the Amnesty Act, restoring full civil rights to about 500 Confederate sympathizers.
- November 5, 1872: Ulysses S. Grant re-elected as President of the United States. Susan B. Anthony voted illegally in the election.

== Major legislation ==
- February 6, 1872: Joint Resolution instructing our senators and requesting our representatives in congress to oppose the passage of a bill for the remission of import duties on building material to be used in rebuilding the burnt district of Chicago, 1872 Joint Resolution 1. Opposed the lifting of tariffs on foreign timber and building materials, a move that was contemplated to aide in the reconstruction of Chicago after the Great Chicago Fire.
- February 14, 1872: An Act to prohibit and prevent the carrying of concealed weapons, 1872 Act 7.
- March 5, 1872: An Act making election days legal holidays, 1872 Act 32.
- March 9, 1872: An Act to apportion the state of Wisconsin into congressional districts, 1872 Act 48. Wisconsin's congressional delegation grew from six to eight members.
- March 15, 1872: An Act to protect the use of the telegraph, 1872 Act 54. To outlaw the act of intercepting a telegraph intended for another recipient.
- March 21, 1872: An Act to amend section two of chapter one hundred and fifty-six of the general laws of 1871, entitled "an act to apportion the state of Wisconsin into senate and assembly districts," 1872 Act 70. Reconfigured the Monroe County Assembly districts.
- March 21, 1872: An Act authorizing cities and villages to establish free public libraries and reading rooms, 1872 Act 80.
- March 22, 1872: Joint Resolution to amend section three (3) of article eleven (11) of the constitution, 1872 Joint Resolution 11. Proposed an amendment to the state constitution to prohibit counties, municipalities, and school districts from going into debt.
- March 22, 1872: An Act to provide for the improvement of the capitol park, 1872 Act 93.
- March 23, 1872: An Act to submit to the people an amendment to article seven of the constitution, 1872 Act 111. Setting a referendum for an amendment to the state constitution expanding the Supreme Court from three to five justices. The referendum ultimately failed in the November 1872 general election.
- March 25, 1872: An Act to enable married women to transact business, make contracts, and sue and be sued, and to define the liabilities of husbands and wives, 1872 Act 155.

== Party summary ==
=== Senate summary ===
Senate partisan composition Democratic: 10 seats Republican: 23 seats

	Party (Shading indicates majority caucus)		Total	
	Democratic	Republican	Total	Vacant
End of previous Legislature	14	19	33	0
1st Session	10	23	33	0
Final voting share	30.3%	69.7%		
Beginning of the next Legislature	10	23	33	0

=== Assembly summary ===
Assembly partisan composition Democratic: 40 seats Republican: 60 seats

	Party (Shading indicates majority caucus)			Total	
	Democratic	Ind.	Republican	Total	Vacant
End of previous Legislature	40	3	57	100	0
1st Session	40	0	60	100	0
Final voting share	40%	0%	60%		
Beginning of the next Legislature	39	0	61	100	0

== Sessions ==
- 1st Regular session: January 10, 1872 – March 26, 1872

== Leaders ==
=== Senate leadership ===
- President of the Senate: Milton Pettit (R)
- President pro tempore: Charles G. Williams (R)

=== Assembly leadership ===
- Speaker of the Assembly: Daniel Hall (R)

== Members ==
=== Members of the Senate ===
Members of the Senate for the Twenty-Fifth Wisconsin Legislature:

Senate partisan representation Democratic: 10 seats Republican: 23 seats

Dist.	Counties	Senator	Residence	Party
01	Sheboygan	John H. Jones	Sheboygan	Rep.
02	Brown, Door, Kewaunee	Myron P. Lindsley	Green Bay	Dem.
03	Milwaukee (Northern Part)	Francis Huebschmann	Milwaukee	Dem.
04	Monroe & Vernon	William Nelson	Viroqua	Rep.
05	Racine	Philo Belden	Rochester	Rep.
06	Milwaukee (Southern Half)	John L. Mitchell	Milwaukee	Dem.
07	Dane (Eastern Part)	William M. Colladay	Dunn	Rep.
08	Kenosha & Walworth	Samuel Pratt	Spring Prairie	Rep.
09	Iowa	Francis Little	Mineral Point	Rep.
10	Waukesha	William Blair	Waukesha	Rep.
11	Lafayette	Henry S. Magoon	Darlington	Rep.
12	Green	Orrin Bacon	Monticello	Rep.
13	Dodge	Satterlee Clark	Horicon	Dem.
14	Sauk	John B. Quimby	Sauk City	Rep.
15	Manitowoc	Carl H. Schmidt	Manitowoc	Dem.
16	Grant	John C. Holloway	Lancaster	Rep.
17	Rock	Charles G. Williams	Janesville	Rep.
18	Fond du Lac (Western Part)	William Hiner	Fond du Lac	Rep.
19	Winnebago	James H. Foster	Koro	Rep.
20	Fond du Lac (Eastern Part)	Joseph Wagner	Marshfield	Dem.
21	Marathon, Oconto, Shawano, Waupaca, & Northern Outagamie	Myron Reed	Waupaca	Dem.
22	Calumet & Southern Outagamie	George Kreiss	Appleton	Dem.
23	Jefferson	William W. Woodman	Farmington	Dem.
24	Ashland, Barron, Bayfield, Burnett, Douglas, Pierce, Polk, & St. Croix	Joseph E. Irish	New Richmond	Rep.
25	Green Lake, Marquette, & Waushara	Waldo Flint	Princeton	Rep.
26	Dane (Western Part)	Romanzo E. Davis	Middleton	Rep.
27	Columbia	William M. Griswold	Columbus	Rep.
28	Crawford & Richland	Henry L. Eaton	Lone Rock	Rep.
29	Adams, Juneau, Portage, & Wood	Eliphalet S. Miner	Necedah	Rep.
30	Chippewa, Dunn, Eau Claire, & Pepin	Joseph G. Thorp	Eau Claire	Rep.
31	La Crosse	Angus Cameron	La Crosse	Rep.
32	Buffalo, Clark, Jackson, & Trempealeau	Orlando Brown	Modena	Rep.
33	Ozaukee & Washington	Lyman Morgan	Ozaukee	Dem.

=== Members of the Assembly ===
Members of the Assembly for the Twenty-Fifth Wisconsin Legislature:

Assembly partisan representation Democratic: 40 seats Republican: 60 seats

Senate District	County	Dist.	Representative	Party	Residence
29	Adams & Wood		George A. Neeves	Rep.	Grand Rapids
24	Ashland, Barron, Bayfield, Burnett, Douglas, Polk		Henry D. Barron	Rep.	St. Croix Falls
02	Brown & Southern Kewaunee	1	Christian Wœlz	Dem.	Green Bay
02	Brown & Southern Kewaunee	2	David Cooper Ayres	Rep.	Fort Howard
02	Brown & Southern Kewaunee	3	Daniel Lee	Dem.	De Pere
32	Buffalo		George Cowie	Dem.	Glencoe
22	Calumet		C. H. M. Petersen	Dem.	New Holstein
30	Chippewa		John J. Jenkins	Rep.	Chippewa Falls
32	Clark & Jackson		Eustace L. Brockway	Rep.	Black River Falls
27	Columbia	1	William W. Corning	Dem.	Portage
27	Columbia	2	Henry C. Brace	Rep.	Fountain Prairie
27	Columbia	3	Jacob Low	Rep.	Lowville
28	Crawford		Oliver A. Caswell	Dem.	Utica
07	Dane	1	Benjamin F. Adams	Rep.	Pleasant Springs
07	Dane	2	John D. Gurnee	Dem.	Madison
26	Dane	3	John Adams	Dem.	Black Earth
26	Dane	4	Phineas Baldwin	Rep.	Oregon
13	Dodge	1	Michael Adams	Rep.	Elba
13	Dodge	2	Calvin E. Lewis	Rep.	Beaver Dam
13	Dodge	3	Allen H. Atwater	Rep.	Oak Grove
13	Dodge	4	Silas W. Lamoreux	Dem.	Mayville
13	Dodge	5	George Schott	Dem.	Rubicon
13	Dodge	6	John Solon	Dem.	Shields
02	Door & Northern Kewaunee		Gideon W. Allen	Dem.	Sturgeon Bay
30	Dunn & Pepin		Elias P. Bailey	Rep.	Lucas
30	Eau Claire		Bradley Phillips	Rep.	Eau Claire
18	Fond du Lac	1	Andrew J. Yorty	Rep.	Metomen
18	Fond du Lac	2	Elihu Colman	Rep.	Fond du Lac
20	Fond du Lac	3	Aaron Walters	Dem.	Eden
16	Grant	1	George Cabanis	Rep.	Big Patch
16	Grant	2	Allen R. Bushnell	Rep.	Lancaster
16	Grant	3	Samuel A. Ferrin	Rep.	Wingville
16	Grant	4	Jerome B. Cory	Rep.	Patch Grove
12	Green		Marshal H. Pengra	Rep.	Sylvester
25	Green Lake		Archibald Nichols	Rep.	Markesan
09	Iowa	1	William E. Rowe	Dem.	Arena
09	Iowa	2	John Strachan	Dem.	Mineral Point
23	Jefferson	1	Daniel Hall	Rep.	Watertown
23	Jefferson	2	William L. Hoskins	Dem.	Lake Mills
23	Jefferson	3	Lucien B. Caswell	Rep.	Fort Atkinson
29	Juneau		Henry F. C. Nichols	Rep.	New Lisbon
08	Kenosha		Frederick Robinson	Dem.	Kenosha
31	La Crosse		Gideon Hixon	Rep.	La Crosse
11	Lafayette		Thomas Bainbridge	Rep.	Benton
15	Manitowoc	1	Peter Reuther	Rep.	Centerville
15	Manitowoc	2	Martin McNamara	Dem.	Maple Grove
15	Manitowoc	3	Joseph Rankin	Dem.	Manitowoc
21	Marathon		Bartholomew Ringle	Dem.	Wausau
25	Marquette		Neil Dimond	Dem.	Buffalo
03	Milwaukee	1	John W. Cary	Dem.	Milwaukee
03	Milwaukee	2	George Abert	Dem.	Milwaukee
06	Milwaukee	3	John Black	Dem.	Milwaukee
06	Milwaukee	4	Frederick C. Winkler	Rep.	Milwaukee
06	Milwaukee	5	Charles H. Larkin	Dem.	Milwaukee
03	Milwaukee	6	Emil Wallber	Rep.	Milwaukee
06	Milwaukee	7	Winfield Smith	Rep.	Milwaukee
06	Milwaukee	8	John Fellenz	Dem.	Milwaukee
03	Milwaukee	9	Moritz Becker	Dem.	Milwaukee
03	Milwaukee	10	Henry Fowler	Dem.	Milwaukee
06	Milwaukee	11	Adin P. Hobart	Rep.	Oak Creek
04	Monroe	1	Eli O. Rudd	Rep.	Rudd's Mills
04	Monroe	2	John F. Richards	Rep.	Tomah
21	Oconto		Richard W. Hubbell	Rep.	Oconto
33	Ozaukee	1	John R. Bohan	Dem.	Ozaukee
33	Ozaukee	2	Frederick W. Horn	Dem.	Cedarburg
24	Pierce		Oliver S. Powell	Rep.	River Falls
29	Portage		Oliver Lamoreux	Dem.	Plover
05	Racine	1	Richard B. Bates	Dem.	Racine
05	Racine	2	William V. Moore	Rep.	Yorkville
28	Richland	1	William Dixon	Rep.	Ithaca
28	Richland	2	George W. Putnam	Rep.	Marshall
17	Rock	1	Orlando F. Wallihan	Rep.	Footville
17	Rock	2	Zebulon P. Burdick	Rep.	Janesville
17	Rock	3	Dustin G. Cheever	Rep.	Clinton
17	Rock	4	Eugene K. Felt	Rep.	Newark
17	Rock	5	Alexander Graham	Rep.	Janesville
14	Sauk	1	William W. Perry	Rep.	Sumpter
14	Sauk	2	George G. Swain	Rep.	Delton
22	Outagamie, Shawano, & Waupaca	1	William H. H. Wroe	Rep.	Dale
21	Outagamie, Shawano, & Waupaca	2	Michael Gorman	Dem.	Lebanon
21	Outagamie, Shawano, & Waupaca	3	Archibald D. Smith	Rep.	Lind
01	Sheboygan	1	George W. Weeden	Dem.	Sheboygan
01	Sheboygan	2	Patrick H. O'Rourk	Dem.	Lyndon
01	Sheboygan	3	Major Shaw	Rep.	Lima
24	St. Croix		John C. Spooner	Rep.	Hudson
32	Trempealeau		Noah D. Comstock	Rep.	Arcadia
04	Vernon	1	Reuben May	Rep.	Jefferson
04	Vernon	2	Henry A. Chase	Rep.	Viroqua
08	Walworth	1	Elijah M. Sharp	Rep.	Delavan
08	Walworth	2	Amos W. Stafford	Rep.	Bloomfield
08	Walworth	3	Samuel A. White	Dem.	Whitewater
33	Washington	1	Densmore W. Maxon	Dem.	Cedar Creek
33	Washington	2	Baruch S. Weil	Dem.	Schleisingerville
10	Waukesha	1	Eliphalet Stone	Rep.	Summit
10	Waukesha	2	Charles Brown	Rep.	Brookfield Center
25	Waushara		Hobart S. Sacket	Rep.	Aurora
19	Winnebago	1	Thomas D. Grimmer	Rep.	Oshkosh
19	Winnebago	2	Azel W. Patten	Dem.	Neenah
19	Winnebago	3	Nelson F. Beckwith	Dem.	Omro
19	Winnebago	4	Alson Wood	Rep.	Rushford

== Changes from the 24th Legislature ==
New districts for the 25th Legislature were defined in 1871 Wisconsin Act 156, passed into law in the 24th Wisconsin Legislature.

=== Senate redistricting ===
==== Summary of changes ====
- 17 Senate districts were left unchanged (or were only renumbered).
- The Dane County district boundaries were slightly redrawn and renumbered (7, 26).
- Dodge County went from having two senators to one (13).
- Fond du Lac County went from having one senator to two (18, 20).
- Kenosha and Walworth counties were combined into one district (8).
- La Crosse County became its own senate district (31), after previously having been in a shared district with Vernon county.
- The Milwaukee County district boundaries were slightly redrawn and renumbered (3, 6).
- Outagamie County was split between two multi-county districts (21, 22).
- Ozaukee and Washington counties were combined into one district (33).
- The old multi-county 32nd Senate district was split into two districts (30, 32).

==== Senate districts ====
after redistricting

before redistricting

Dist.	24th Legislature	25th Legislature
1	Sheboygan County	Sheboygan County
2	Brown, Door, Kewaunee counties	Brown, Door, Kewaunee counties
3	Ozaukee County	Northern Milwaukee County
4	Washington County	Monroe, Vernon counties
5	Northern Milwaukee County	Racine County
6	Southern Milwaukee County	Southern Milwaukee County
7	Racine County	Eastern Dane County
8	Kenosha County	Kenosha, Walworth counties
9	Adams, Juneau, Monroe counties	Iowa County
10	Waukesha County	Waukesha County
11	Eastern Dane County	Lafayette County
12	Walworth County	Green County
13	Lafayette County	Dodge County
14	Sauk County	Sauk County
15	Iowa County	Manitowoc County
16	Grant County	Grant County
17	Rock County	Rock County
18	Western Dodge County	Western Fond du Lac County
19	Manitowoc County	Winnebago County
20	Fond du Lac County	Eastern Fond du Lac County
21	Winnebago County	Marathon, Oconto, Shawano, Waupaca, Northern Outagamie counties
22	Calumet, Oconto, Outagamie, Shawano counties	Calumet, Southern Outagamie counties
23	Jefferson County	Jefferson County
24	Green County	Ashland, Barron, Bayfield, Burnett, Douglas, Pierce, Polk, St. Croix counties
25	Columbia County	Green Lake, Marquette, Waushara counties
26	Western Dane County	Western Dane County
27	Marathon, Portage, Waupaca, Wood counties	Columbia County
28	Ashland, Bayfield, Burnett, Dallas, Douglas, Pierce, Polk, St. Croix counties	Crawford, Richland counties
29	Green Lake, Marquette, Waushara counties	Adams, Juneau, Portage, Wood counties
30	Crawford, Richland counties	Chippewa, Dunn, Eau Claire, Pepin counties
31	La Crosse, Vernon counties	La Crosse County
32	Buffalo, Chippewa, Clark, Dunn, Eau Claire, Jackson, Pepin, Trempealeau counties	Buffalo, Clark, Jackson, Trempealeau counties
33	Eastern Dodge County	Ozaukee, Washington counties

=== Assembly redistricting ===
==== Summary of changes ====
- Adams and Wood counties became a combined district, Wood had previously been in a shared district with Marathon County, Adams had previously been its own Assembly district.
- Brown County went from having 2 districts to 3.
- Chippewa County became its own assembly district, after previously having been in a shared district with Dunn.
- Dane County went from having 5 districts to 4.
- Dodge County went from having 4 districts to 6.
- Eau Claire County became its own assembly district, after previously having been in a shared district with Pepin County.
- Fond du Lac County went from having 6 districts to 3.
- Grant County went from having 5 districts to 4.
- Jefferson County went from having 4 districts to 3.
- La Crosse County went from having 2 districts to 1.
- Lafayette County went from having 2 districts to 1.
- Milwaukee County went from having 10 districts to 11.
- Richland County went from having 1 district to 2.
- Washington County went from having 3 districts to 2.
- Waukesha County went from having 3 districts to 2.

==== Assembly districts ====
County	Districts in 24th Legislature	Districts in 25th Legislature	Change
Adams	1 District	Shared with Wood	▼
Ashland	Shared with Barron, Bayfield, Burnett, Douglas, Polk	Shared with Barron, Bayfield, Burnett, Douglas, Polk	Steady
Barron	Shared with Ashland, Bayfield, Burnett, Douglas, Polk	Shared with Ashland, Bayfield, Burnett, Douglas, Polk	Steady
Bayfield	Shared with Ashland, Barron, Burnett, Douglas, Polk	Shared with Ashland, Barron, Burnett, Douglas, Polk	Steady
Brown	2 Districts	3 Districts	▲
Buffalo	1 District	1 District	Steady
Burnett	Shared with Ashland, Barron, Bayfield, Douglas, Polk	Shared with Ashland, Barron, Bayfield, Douglas, Polk	Steady
Calumet	1 District	1 District	Steady
Chippewa	Shared with Dunn	1 District	▲
Clark	Shared with Jackson	Shared with Jackson	Steady
Columbia	3 Districts	3 Districts	Steady
Crawford	1 District	1 District	Steady
Dane	5 Districts	4 Districts	▼
Dodge	5 Districts	6 Districts	▲
Door	Shared with Kewaunee	Shared with Northern Kewaunee	▲
Douglas	Shared with Ashland, Barron, Bayfield, Burnett, Polk	Shared with Ashland, Barron, Bayfield, Burnett, Polk	Steady
Dunn	Shared with Chippewa	Shared with Pepin	Steady
Eau Claire	Shared with Pepin	1 District	▲
Fond du Lac	6 Districts	3 Districts	▼
Grant	5 Districts	4 Districts	▼
Green	2 Districts	1 District	▼
Green Lake	1 District	1 District	Steady
Iowa	2 Districts	2 Districts	Steady
Jackson	Shared with Clark	Shared with Clark	Steady
Jefferson	4 Districts	3 Districts	▼
Juneau	1 District	1 District	Steady
Kenosha	1 District	1 District	Steady
Kewaunee	Shared with Door	Divided between Door and Brown	▲
La Crosse	2 Districts	1 District	▼
Lafayette	2 Districts	1 District	▼
Manitowoc	3 Districts	3 Districts	Steady
Marathon	Shared with Wood	1 District	▲
Marquette	1 District	1 District	Steady
Milwaukee	10 Districts	11 Districts	▲
Monroe	1 District	2 Districts	▲
Oconto	Shared with Shawano	1 District	▲
Outagamie	1 District	Divided between Shawano and own district	▲
Ozaukee	1 District	2 Districts	▲
Pepin	Shared with Eau Claire	Shared with Dunn	Steady
Pierce	1 District	1 District	Steady
Polk	Shared with Ashland, Barron, Bayfield, Burnett, Douglas	Shared with Ashland, Barron, Bayfield, Burnett, Douglas	Steady
Portage	1 District	1 District	Steady
Racine	2 Districts	2 Districts	Steady
Richland	1 District	2 Districts	▲
Rock	5 Districts	5 Districts	Steady
Sauk	2 Districts	2 Districts	Steady
Shawano	Shared with Oconto	Shared with Northern Outagamie & Eastern Waupaca	Steady
Sheboygan	3 Districts	3 Districts	Steady
St. Croix	1 District	1 District	Steady
Trempealeau	1 District	1 District	Steady
Vernon	2 Districts	2 Districts	Steady
Walworth	3 Districts	3 Districts	Steady
Washington	3 Districts	2 Districts	▼
Waukesha	3 Districts	2 Districts	▼
Waupaca	1 District	Shared with Shawano & Northern Outagamie	▼
Waushara	1 District	1 District	Steady
Winnebago	3 Districts	4 Districts	▲
Wood	Shared with Marathon	Shared with Adams	Steady
