= 26th Wisconsin Legislature =

Wisconsin legislative term for 1873

←	25th	27th	→
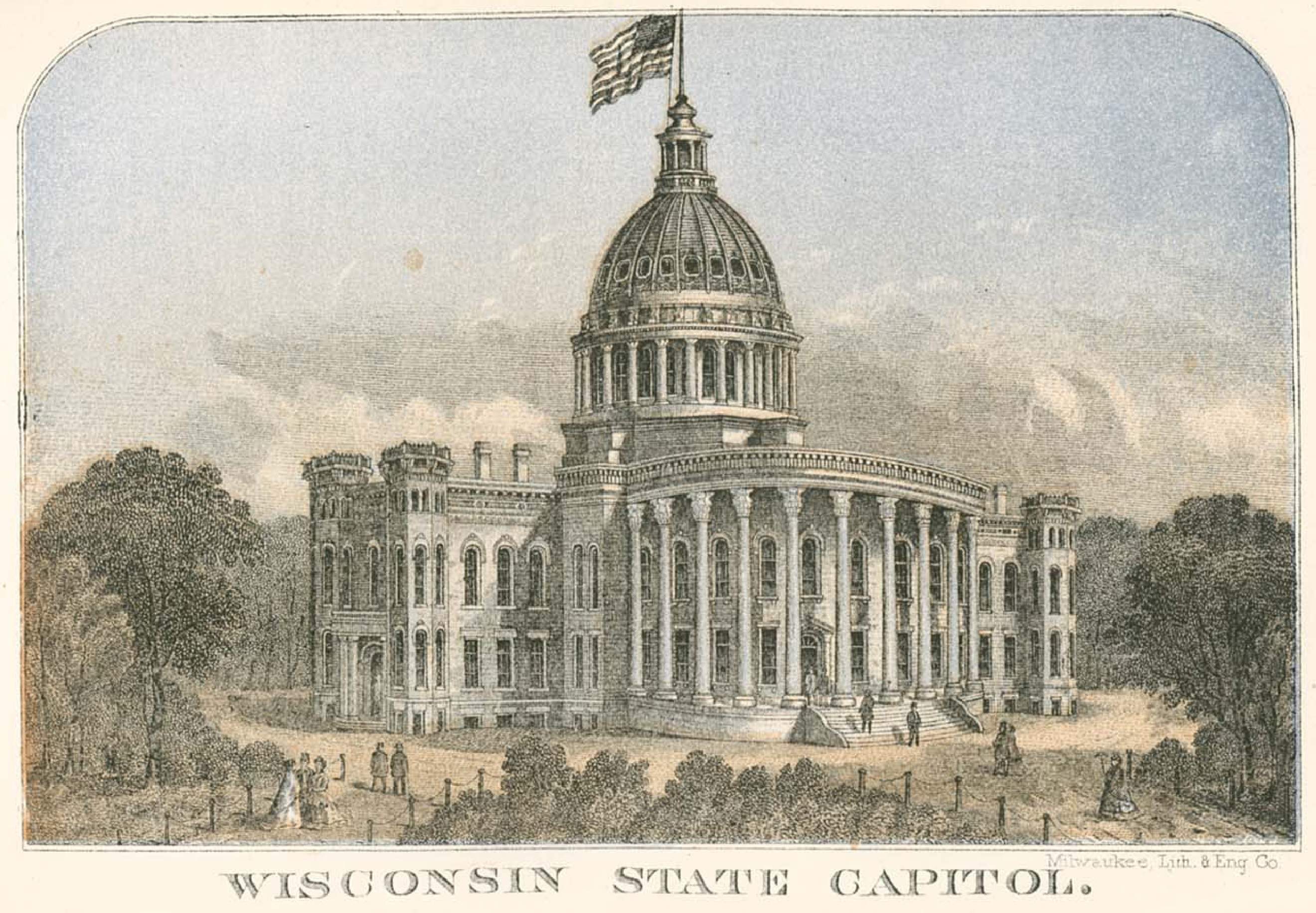
- Wisconsin State Capitol, 1863

Overview
- Legislative body: Wisconsin Legislature
- Meeting place: Wisconsin State Capitol
- Term: January 6, 1873 – January 5, 1874
- Election: November 5, 1872

Senate
- Members: 33
- Senate President: Milton Pettit (R)
- President pro tempore: Henry L. Eaton (R)
- Party control: Republican

Assembly
- Members: 100
- Assembly Speaker: Henry D. Barron (R)
- Party control: Republican

Sessions
- 1st: January 8, 1873 – March 20, 1873

The Twenty-Sixth Wisconsin Legislature convened from January 8, 1873, to March 20, 1873, in regular session.

Senators representing odd-numbered districts were newly elected for this session and were serving the first year of a two-year term. Assembly members were elected to a one-year term. Assembly members and odd-numbered senators were elected in the general election of November 5, 1872. Senators representing even-numbered districts were serving the second year of their two-year term, having been elected in the general election held on November 7, 1871.

The governor of Wisconsin during this entire term was Republican Cadwallader C. Washburn, of La Crosse County, serving the second year of a two-year term, having won election in the 1871 Wisconsin gubernatorial election.

== Major events ==
- January 22, 1873: Timothy O. Howe re-elected as United States Senator by the Wisconsin Legislature in Joint Session.
- February 11, 1873: King Amadeo I of Spain was deposed and the First Spanish Republic was proclaimed.
- March 4, 1873: Second inauguration of President Ulysses S. Grant.
- March 23, 1873: Wisconsin Lieutenant Governor Milton Pettit died in office.
- May 7, 1873: Salmon P. Chase, Chief Justice of the United States, died of a stroke at New York City.
- September 18, 1873: The New York stock market crashed, leading to the Panic of 1873 and the Long Depression.
- September 24, 1873: Wisconsin Democrats convened in Milwaukee with Grangers and Liberal Republicans to form the short-lived Reform Party, and nominated William Robert Taylor as their candidate for Governor.
- November 5, 1873: William Robert Taylor elected Governor of Wisconsin.
- December 23, 1873: The Woman's Christian Temperance Union was founded at Hillsboro, Ohio.

== Major legislation ==
- March 14, 1873: An Act to provide for finishing the state capitol, protecting the same against fire, for the improvement of the capitol park, and appropriating money to pay for the same, 1873 Act 168.
- March 17, 1873: An Act to provide for the collection of certain statistics with a view of more fully equalizing the state taxes, 1873 Act 210.
- March 17, 1873: An Act to prevent the careless use of firearms, 1873 Act 212.
- March 18, 1873: An Act to provide for annexing and excluding territory to and from cities, towns and villages, and to unite cities, towns and villages, 1873 Act 234.
- March 18, 1873: Joint Resolution ratifying proposed constitutional amendment prohibiting counties, towns, villages, etc., from becoming indebted for any purpose to an amount exceeding five percent of the value of taxable property, 1873 Joint Resolution 4.

== Party summary ==
=== Senate summary ===
Senate partisan composition Democratic: 10 seats Lib. Rep.: 2 seats Republican: 21 seats

	Party (Shading indicates majority caucus)				Total	
	Dem.	Ref.	Lib.R.	Rep.	Total	Vacant
End of previous Legislature	10	0	0	23	33	0
1st Session	10	0	2	21	33	0
Final voting share	30.3%		69.7%			
Beginning of the next Legislature	12	2	2	17	33	0

=== Assembly summary ===
Assembly partisan composition Democratic: 31 seats Lib. Rep.: 7 seats Republican: 62 seats

	Party (Shading indicates majority caucus)					Total	
	Dem.	Ref.	Ind.	Lib.R.	Rep.	Total	Vacant
End of previous Legislature	41	0	0	0	60	100	0
1st Session	31	0	0	7	62	100	0
Final voting share	31%	0%	0%	7%	62%		
Beginning of the next Legislature	29	15	3	12	41	100	0

== Sessions ==
- 1st Regular session: January 8, 1873 – March 20, 1873

== Leaders ==
=== Senate leadership ===
- President of the Senate: Milton Pettit (R)
- President pro tempore: Henry L. Eaton (R)

=== Assembly leadership ===
- Speaker of the Assembly: Henry D. Barron (R)

== Members ==
=== Members of the Senate ===
Members of the Senate for the Twenty-Sixth Wisconsin Legislature:

Senate partisan representation Democratic: 10 seats Lib. Rep.: 2 seats Republican: 21 seats

Dist.	Counties	Senator	Residence	Party
01	Sheboygan	Patrick H. O'Rourk	Cascade	Dem.
02	Brown, Door, Kewaunee	Myron P. Lindsley	Green Bay	Dem.
03	Milwaukee (Northern Part)	Frederick W. Cotzhausen	Milwaukee	Dem.
04	Monroe & Vernon	William Nelson	Viroqua	Rep.
05	Racine	Robert H. Baker	Racine	Rep.
06	Milwaukee (Southern Half)	John L. Mitchell	Milwaukee	Dem.
07	Dane (Eastern Part)	John A. Johnson	Madison	Rep.
08	Kenosha & Walworth	Samuel Pratt	Spring Prairie	Rep.
09	Iowa	Francis Little	Mineral Point	Rep.
10	Waukesha	William Blair	Waukesha	Rep.
11	Lafayette	Francis Campbell	Gratiot	Rep.
12	Green	Orrin Bacon	Monticello	Rep.
13	Dodge	Samuel D. Burchard	Beaver Dam	Dem.
14	Sauk	John B. Quimby	Sauk City	Rep.
15	Manitowoc	Carl H. Schmidt	Manitowoc	Dem.
16	Grant	John C. Holloway	Lancaster	Rep.
17	Rock	Horatio N. Davis	Beloit	Rep.
18	Fond du Lac (Western Part)	William Hiner	Fond du Lac	Rep.
19	Winnebago	Robert McCurdy	Oshkosh	Rep.
20	Fond du Lac (Eastern Part)	Joseph Wagner	Marshfield	Dem.
21	Marathon, Oconto, Shawano, Waupaca, & Northern Outagamie	Myron H. McCord	Shawano	Rep.
22	Calumet & Southern Outagamie	George Kreiss	Appleton	Dem.
23	Jefferson	Walter S. Greene	Milford	Dem.
24	Ashland, Barron, Bayfield, Burnett, Douglas, Pierce, Polk, & St. Croix	Joseph E. Irish	Hudson	Rep.
25	Green Lake, Marquette, & Waushara	Robert L. D. Potter	Wautoma	Rep.
26	Dane (Western Part)	Romanzo E. Davis	Middleton	Lib. R.
27	Columbia	Evan O. Jones	Courtland	Rep.
28	Crawford & Richland	Henry L. Eaton	Lone Rock	Rep.
29	Adams, Juneau, Portage, & Wood	Thomas B. Scott	Grand Rapids	Rep.
30	Chippewa, Dunn, Eau Claire, & Pepin	Joseph G. Thorp	Eau Claire	Rep.
31	La Crosse	Gideon Hixon	La Crosse	Rep.
32	Buffalo, Clark, Jackson, & Trempealeau	Orlando Brown	Modena	Lib. R.
33	Ozaukee & Washington	Adam Schantz	Addison	Dem.

=== Members of the Assembly ===
Members of the Assembly for the Twenty-Sixth Wisconsin Legislature:

Assembly partisan representation Democratic: 31 seats Lib. Rep.: 7 seats Republican: 62 seats

Senate District	County	Dist.	Representative	Party	Residence
29	Adams & Wood		Charles A. Cady	Rep.	Dell Prairie
24	Ashland, Barron, Bayfield, Burnett, Douglas, Polk		Henry D. Barron	Rep.	St. Croix Falls
02	Brown & Southern Kewaunee	1	Joseph S. Curtis	Rep.	Green Bay
02	Brown & Southern Kewaunee	2	William H. Bartran	Rep.	Suamico
02	Brown & Southern Kewaunee	3	Dennis Dewane	Dem.	New Denmark
32	Buffalo		Robert Lees	Dem.	Gilmantown
22	Calumet		Thomas Lynch	Dem.	Chilton
30	Chippewa		Albert Pound	Rep.	Chippewa Falls
32	Clark & Jackson		Edward E. Merritt	Rep.	Neillsville
27	Columbia	1	Samuel S. Brannan	Rep.	Portage
27	Columbia	2	Henry C. Brace	Rep.	Fountain Prairie
27	Columbia	3	John L. Porter	Rep.	Pacific
28	Crawford		Peter Doyle	Dem.	Prairie du Chien
07	Dane	1	Oliver W. Thornton	Rep.	Medina
07	Dane	2	Levi B. Vilas	Dem.	Madison
26	Dane	3	Otto Kerl	Dem.	Berry
26	Dane	4	Hiram Cornwell	Rep.	Verona
13	Dodge	1	John W. Davis	Dem.	Fox Lake
13	Dodge	2	John Runkel	Dem.	Lowell
13	Dodge	3	Wilfred C. Fuller	Dem.	Chester
13	Dodge	4	Dennis Short	Dem.	Lomira
13	Dodge	5	Satterlee Clark	Dem.	Horicon
13	Dodge	6	Ferdinand Gnewuch	Dem.	Lebanon
02	Door & Northern Kewaunee		De Wayne Stebbins	Rep.	Ahnapee
30	Dunn & Pepin		Horace E. Houghton	Rep.	Durand
30	Eau Claire		William P. Bartlett	Rep.	Eau Claire
18	Fond du Lac	1	Alonzo A. Loper	Rep.	Ripon
18	Fond du Lac	2	Rensselaer M. Lewis	Lib. R.	Fond du Lac
20	Fond du Lac	3	Truman M. Fay	Dem.	Byron
16	Grant	1	Thomas G. Stephens	Lib. R.	Hazel Green
16	Grant	2	William H. Clise	Rep.	Lancaster
16	Grant	3	John Monteith	Rep.	Fennimore
16	Grant	4	Christopher Hutchinson	Rep.	Beetown
12	Green		John Luchsinger	Rep.	New Glarus
25	Green Lake		Appollos D. Foote	Rep.	Berlin
09	Iowa	1	William E. Rowe	Lib. R.	Arena
09	Iowa	2	William Robinson	Rep.	Moscow
23	Jefferson	1	Patrick Devy	Dem.	Watertown
23	Jefferson	2	Casper Steinfort	Lib. R.	Lake Mills
23	Jefferson	3	James W. Ostrander	Rep.	Jefferson
29	Juneau		Henry F. C. Nichols	Rep.	New Lisbon
08	Kenosha		Asahel Farr	Rep.	Kenosha
31	La Crosse		Alex McMillan	Rep.	La Crosse
11	Lafayette		William H. Armstrong	Rep.	Darlington
15	Manitowoc	1	Charles R. Zorn	Dem.	Schleswig
15	Manitowoc	2	Orsamus S. Davis	Rep.	Cato
15	Manitowoc	3	Joseph Rankin	Dem.	Manitowoc
21	Marathon		Daniel L. Plumer	Ref.	Wausau
25	Marquette		Charles S. Kelsey	Rep.	Montello
03	Milwaukee	1	Isaac W. Van Schaick	Rep.	Milwaukee
03	Milwaukee	2	Jacob Sander	Lib. R.	Milwaukee
06	Milwaukee	3	James McGrath	Dem.	Milwaukee
06	Milwaukee	4	Gottlob E. Weiss	Dem.	Milwaukee
06	Milwaukee	5	John A. Becher	Rep.	Milwaukee
03	Milwaukee	6	Casper Sanger	Rep.	Milwaukee
06	Milwaukee	7	Henry L. Palmer	Dem.	Milwaukee
06	Milwaukee	8	Galen Seaman	Rep.	Milwaukee
03	Milwaukee	9	Moritz Becker	Dem.	Milwaukee
03	Milwaukee	10	Thomas Tobin	Dem.	Wauwatosa
06	Milwaukee	11	John B. Stemper	Dem.	Oak Creek
04	Monroe	1	James H. Allen	Rep.	Sparta
04	Monroe	2	Adelbert Bleekman	Rep.	Tomah
21	Oconto		Richard W. Hubbell	Rep.	Oconto
22	Outagamie, Shawano, & Waupaca	1	John A. Roemer	Dem.	Appleton
21	Outagamie, Shawano, & Waupaca	2	Corydon L. Rich	Dem.	Bovina
21	Outagamie, Shawano, & Waupaca	3	Columbus Caldwell	Rep.	Lind
33	Ozaukee	1	Charles E. Chamberlin	Dem.	Ozaukee
33	Ozaukee	2	Adolphus Zimmermann	Dem.	Mequon
24	Pierce		James H. Persons	Rep.	Union
29	Portage		David R. Clements	Rep.	Stevens Point
05	Racine	1	John Elkins	Rep.	Racine
05	Racine	2	Richard Richards	Rep.	Mount Pleasant
28	Richland	1	Norman L. James	Rep.	Richland Center
28	Richland	2	George W. Putnam	Rep.	Marshall
17	Rock	1	John M. Evans	Rep.	Union
17	Rock	2	David F. Sayre	Rep.	Porter
17	Rock	3	Dustin G. Cheever	Rep.	Clinton
17	Rock	4	Eugene K. Felt	Rep.	Newark
17	Rock	5	Henry A. Patterson	Rep.	Janesville
14	Sauk	1	John Young	Rep.	Honey Creek
14	Sauk	2	John Kellogg	Rep.	Reedsburg
01	Sheboygan	1	Julius Bodenstab	Lib. R.	Herman
01	Sheboygan	2	Otto Puhlman	Dem.	Plymouth
01	Sheboygan	3	Peter Daane	Rep.	Holland
24	St. Croix		David C. Fulton	Lib. R.	Hudson
32	Trempealeau		Seth W. Button	Rep.	Trempealeau
04	Vernon	1	Peter Jerman	Rep.	Sterling
04	Vernon	2	J. Henry Tate	Rep.	Viroqua
08	Walworth	1	Carlos L. Douglass	Rep.	Walworth
08	Walworth	2	Frank Leland	Rep.	Elkhorn
08	Walworth	3	Charles R. Gibbs	Rep.	Whitewater
33	Washington	1	Hiram W. Sawyer	Dem.	Hartford
33	Washington	2	Baruch S. Weil	Dem.	Schleisingerville
10	Waukesha	1	Francis G. Parks	Rep.	Eagle
10	Waukesha	2	David Rhoda	Rep.	Oconomowoc
25	Waushara		Sherman Bardwell	Rep.	Plainfield
19	Winnebago	1	Thomas Wall	Dem.	Oshkosh
19	Winnebago	2	Thomas McConnell	Rep.	Winneconne
19	Winnebago	3	Carlton Foster	Rep.	Oshkosh
19	Winnebago	4	Alson Wood	Rep.	Rushford

== Employees ==
=== Senate employees ===
- Chief Clerk: J. H. Waggoner
  - Assistant Clerk: Sid. A. Foster
    - Bookkeeper: T. S. Ansley
  - Engrossing Clerk: Charles A. Booth
  - Enrolling Clerk: Frank Abbott
  - Transcribing Clerk: S. H. Vedder
- Sergeant-at-Arms: A. Emonson
  - Assistant Sergeant-at-Arms: Stephen Coburn
- Postmaster: P. H. Parsons
  - Assistant Postmaster: W. D. Harshaw
- Doorkeeper: Hugh Longstaff
  - Assistant Doorkeeper: Walter Cook
  - Assistant Doorkeeper: W. F. Bingham
  - Assistant Doorkeeper: W. F. Hals
  - Assistant Doorkeeper: John Z. Rittman
  - Gallery Doorkeeper: G. Jones
  - Gallery Doorkeeper: S. S. Miller
  - Night Watch: Frank J. Wood
- Governor's Attendant: Ossian M. Pettit
- Clerk's Messenger: Charles A. Irish
- Messengers:
  - Adolph Hastreiter
  - Arthur Johnson
  - Freddie Richards
  - Willie Bintliff
  - Eddie McCurdy
  - Johnnie Veeder
  - Charlie Fellows
  - Frank Bolting
  - Freddie Davis

=== Assembly employees ===
- Chief Clerk: Ephraim W. Young
  - Assistant Clerk: Fred A. Dennett
    - Bookkeeper: Roger C. Spooner
  - Engrossing Clerk: Mrs. R. A. Vilas
  - Enrolling Clerk: Amos Hitchcock
  - Transcribing Clerk: Faunie Russell
- Sergeant-at-Arms: O. C. Bissell
  - 1st Assistant Sergeant-at-Arms: W. H. Bell
  - 2nd Assistant Sergeant-at-Arms: Richard Pritchard
- Postmaster: M. Herrick
  - 1st Assistant Postmaster: W. W. Baker
  - 2nd Assistant Postmaster: Charles Volner
- Doorkeepers:
  - John Gale
  - George W. Baker
  - S. G. Parkhurst
  - W. W. Phelps
- Night Watch: Fred Bright
- Firemen:
  - Charles Sellers
  - Z. B. Russell
- Gallery Attendants:
  - John Bowen
  - H. J. Stordock
- Committee Room Attendants:
  - George W. Williams
  - M. S. Bowler
  - Ethan Griffith
  - George Slingsby
  - Eugene J. Cole
- Washroom Attendant: O. M. Oleson
- Porter: H. O. Hermonson
- Speaker's Messenger: Willie Holmes
- Chief Clerk's Messenger: Frank R. Norton
- Sergeant-at-Arms' Messenger: Eddie B. Weeks
- Messengers:
  - Charles Murphy
  - Frank Porter
  - Henry Cutler
  - Ed. Hubbell
  - Edwin Roweliff
  - Cassius Paine
  - John Lannan
  - Willie Rudd
  - Charles Wootton
  - Julian French
  - Charles Rothe
  - Mike Comford
  - John Oleson
  - Fred Hawley
