= Martin McNamara =

Martin McNamara may refer to:

- Martin McNamara (Gaelic footballer) (born 1966), Irish Gaelic footballer
- Martin McNamara (hurler) (1864–?), Irish hurler
- Martin McNamara (politician) (1811–?), Irish-American politician
- Martin Dewey McNamara (1896–1966), American Catholic bishop
