= Steinfurt (disambiguation) =

Steinfurt is a city in North Rhine-Westphalia, Germany.

Steinfurt may also refer to:

- Steinfurt (district), a district of North Rhine-Westphalia, Germany
- Steinfurt I – Borken I, an electoral constituency in North Rhine-Westphalia, Germany
- Steinfurt III, an electoral constituency in North Rhine-Westphalia, Germany

== See also ==
- Steinfort (disambiguation)
