= The Daytona Beach News-Journal =

Newspaper in Florida, U.S.

- The August 29, 2013 front page of The Daytona Beach News-Journal
- Type: Daily newspaper
- Format: Broadsheet
- Owner: USA Today Co.
- Publisher: Bill Offill
- Founded: 1883
- Headquarters: 901 Sixth Street; Daytona Beach, Florida 32117 U.S.
- Circulation: 25,557
- ISSN: 1525-2493
- OCLC number: 34198052
- Website: news-journalonline.com

The Daytona Beach News-Journal is a Florida daily newspaper serving Volusia and Flagler Counties.

It grew from the Halifax Journal, which was started in 1883. The Davidson family purchased the newspaper in 1928 and retained control until bankruptcy in 2009. In 1986, The Morning Journal and Evening News merged into one morning newspaper. The newspaper began its online services in 1994.

== History ==
Daytona's early settlers decided that a newspaper would be important for the development of the town. A group of citizens raised money to persuade Florian A. Mann to move his printing press from Ohio to Daytona and start a new publication. Prior to publication of the first issue, 86 subscribers were signed up, all paid in advance. Advertisers also paid in advance for the first three months.

The first issue was scheduled for release on February 1, 1883; however, a schooner bringing the blank paper to Florida shipwrecked off the coast of the Carolinas, with the loss of all hands and cargo. This delayed publication of the first issue until Mann decided to buy a bolt of cotton cloth from Laurence Thompson's dry goods store to use as a substitute.

The first issue of the Halifax Journal was printed and published on the cotton cloth, dated February 15, 1883. The premier issue contained local news, as well as Mann's editorial of praise and hope for the Halifax area. The Halifax Journal continued as a weekly publication until Mann sold the newspaper in 1889 to J.M. Jolley. In 1908, Jolley died and the newspaper was bought by Galen Seaman. After Seaman's death, the paper was bought by W.C. Carter of the Halifax Printing Company, which operated a printing shop connected with the Halifax Journal.

After selling the Halifax Journal, Mann moved to Ormond Beach and started the Ormond Gazette. He later sold this paper to L. Moreton Murray and returned to Daytona Beach, to start the Daytona News. Thomas E. Fitzgerald bought the Daytona News in 1900 and the Ormond Gazette in 1903. Fitzgerald consolidated the two papers and on December 1, 1903, published the first issue of The Daytona Daily News.

Hugh Sparkman started a stock company which bought the Halifax Journal and turned it into a daily publication. In 1926, the stock company bought The Daytona Daily News from Fitzgerald. The stock company ceased publication of The Morning Journal, but continued The Evening News and The Sunday News-Journal.

In 1928, Julius Davidson and his son, Herbert M. Davidson, purchased a majority interest in the company, beginning an 80-year period of single family control of the publication. Soon after, the minority owner sold his interest to R.H. Gore, a competitor. The minority shares were later sold to Perry Publications, the owner of The Palm Beach Post. In 1969, The Palm Beach Post was purchased by Cox Enterprises, a media company that owns The Atlanta Journal-Constitution and other publications. Cox acquired Perry's 47.5% interest in the News-Journal, assigned a value of $5 million, as part of the transaction. The Davidson family continued to hold a 52.5% majority of the stock. Cox was not represented on the board of directors and had no say in corporate decisions.

== The News-Journal Center ==
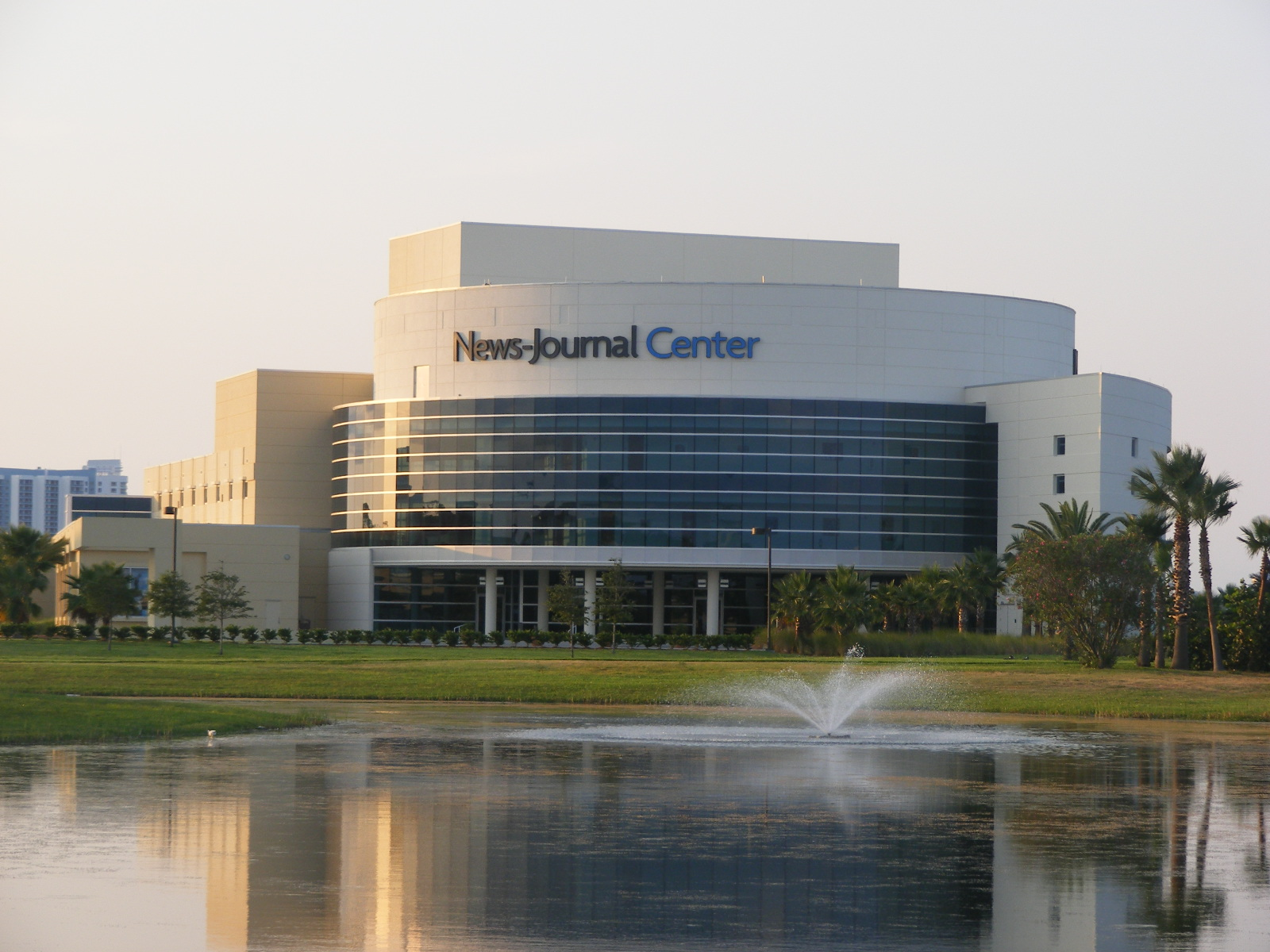
The News-Journal Center in Daytona Beach

In January 2003, the News-Journal offered to pay $13 million for naming rights to a new performing arts center in Daytona Beach being built as a new home for the Seaside Music Theater, founded by News-Journal CEO Tippen Davidson. Cox Enterprises filed suit against the News-Journal Corp. (NJC) in U.S. Federal Court, alleging they "acted irresponsibly in spending corporate funds". Cox alleged that the Davidson family spent the newspaper's money without consulting with them.

Court documents reveal that in the five-year period prior to the filing of Cox's complaint, at least 58 employees of Davidson's arts and entertainment ventures were on the News-Journal Corp. payroll, unbeknownst to NJC's sole minority shareholder. Despite the fact that these employees did no work for NJC, the corporation provided them with full salaries and benefits, at a cost to the company of at least $5.7 million. The trial court found that tens of millions of dollars were diverted to Davidson family projects to "indulge [the Davidsons'] personal interests in the arts".

After failing to have the suit dismissed, the News-Journal Corp. decided to exercise its option to buy out the minority shares. In 2006, the federal court set a valuation of $129.2 million on Cox's interest in the paper. Newspaper management announced in April 2008 that the newspaper would be sold in order to satisfy the judgment. On April 17, 2009, the News-Journal announced its intention to declare bankruptcy, but the judge overseeing the case rejected that option. The board of directors was subsequently removed and the company was placed under court control, with James Hopson serving as the court-appointed manager.

== New ownership ==
Halifax Media Holdings purchased the News-Journal on March 1, 2010 for $20 million and assumed control on April 1, 2010. Michael Redding, Halifax Media's CEO and a former News-Journal department manager, welcomed Bill Offill as publisher of the paper on July 29, 2013.

Halifax Media became the 12th largest media company in the U.S., publishing 33 newspapers and affiliated websites in five states, mostly in the Southeast. The company was owned by a group of investors, including Stephens Capital Partners, of Little Rock, Arkansas; JAARSSS Media of Destin, Florida; and Redding Investments of Daytona Beach. On August 28, 2013, Halifax Media signed a letter of intent with HarborPoint Media for the acquisition of three additional Florida papers. In 2015, Halifax was acquired by New Media Investment Group.
