= Steinfort (disambiguation) =

Steinfort is a town in western Luxembourg.

Steinfort may also refer to:

- Lake Steinfort, in Mecklenburg-Vorpommern, Germany
- SC Steinfort, a football club from Luxembourg
- Testorf-Steinfort, a town in northern Germany
- Carl Steinfort (born 1977), Australian rules football player
- Casper Steinfort (1814–1899), 19th century American politician
- Fred Steinfort (born 1952), American football player

== See also ==
- Steinfortsee
