= Osceola, Polk County, Wisconsin =

Osceola, Wisconsin
- Town
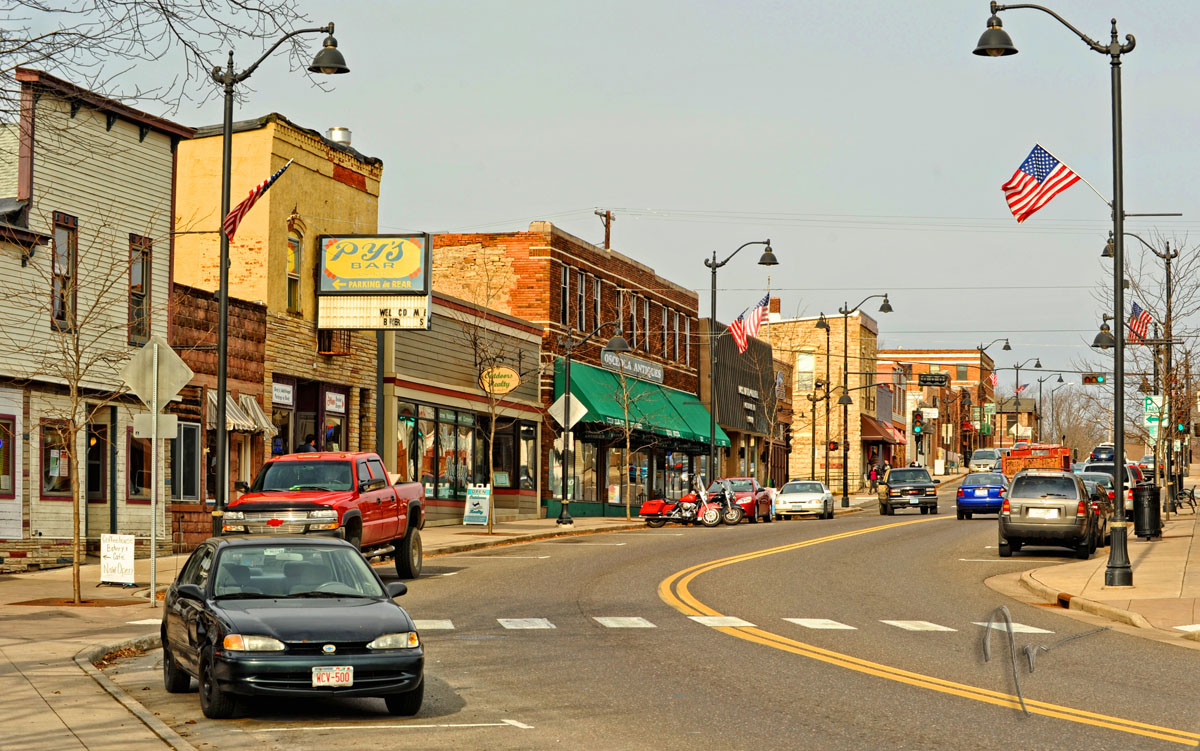
- West side of downtown Osceola (Facing north)

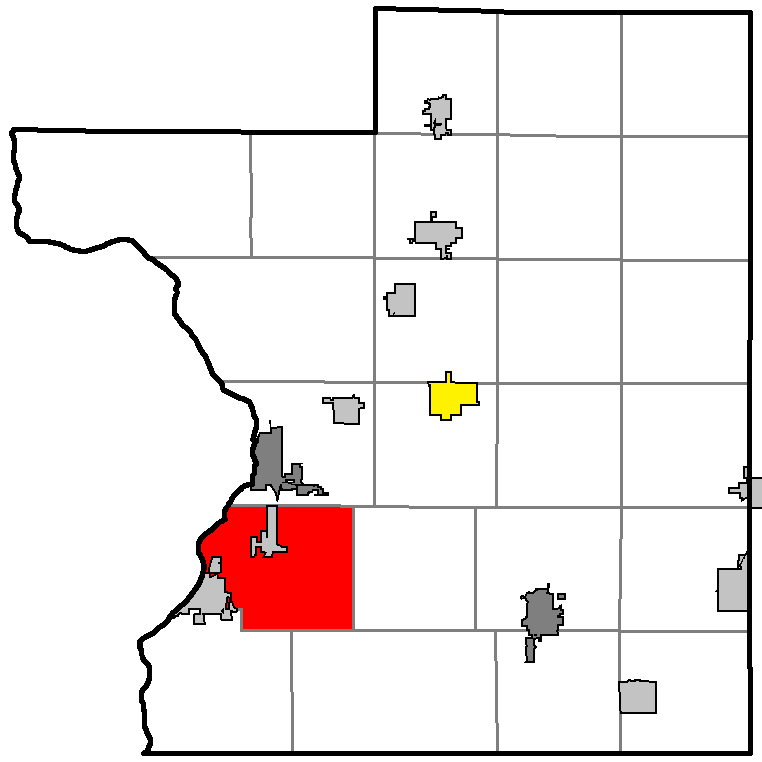
- Location of Osceola, within Polk County

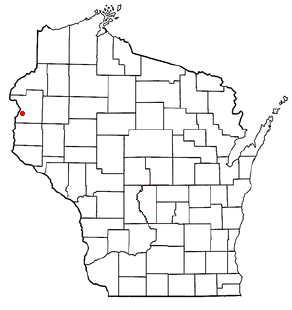
- Location of Osceola, Polk County, Wisconsin
- Coordinates: 45°20′29″N 92°37′19″W
- Country: United States
- State: Wisconsin
- County: Polk

Area
  - Total: 36.7 sq mi (95.1 km^{2})
  - Land: 34.9 sq mi (90.5 km^{2})
  - Water: 1.8 sq mi (4.6 km^{2})
- Elevation: 1,007 ft (307 m)

Population (2020)
  - Total: 3,023
  - Density: 86.5/sq mi (33.4/km^{2})
- Time zone: UTC-6 (Central (CST))
  - Summer (DST): UTC-5 (CDT)
- Area codes: 715 & 534
- FIPS code: 55-60475
- GNIS feature ID: 1583875
- Website: http://townofosceola.com/

Osceola is a town in Polk County, Wisconsin, United States. The population was 3,023 at the 2020 census. The village of Osceola is located mostly within the town. The unincorporated community of Nye is also located in the town.

== Geography ==
According to the United States Census Bureau, the town has a total area of 36.7 square miles (95.2 km^{2}), of which 35.0 square miles (90.5 km^{2}) is land and 1.8 square miles (4.6 km^{2}) (4.87%) is water.

== Demographics ==
As of the census of 2000, there were 2,085 people, 744 households, and 596 families residing in the town. The population density was 59.7 people per square mile (23.0/km^{2}). There were 829 housing units at an average density of 23.7 per square mile (9.2/km^{2}). The racial makeup of the town was 98.80% White, 0.14% Black or African American, 0.10% Native American, 0.19% Asian, 0.05% from other races, and 0.72% from two or more races. 0.48% of the population were Hispanic or Latino of any race.

There were 744 households, out of which 41.8% had children under the age of 18 living with them, 69.4% were married couples living together, 7.1% had a female householder with no husband present, and 19.8% were non-families. 15.3% of all households were made up of individuals, and 3.4% had someone living alone who was 65 years of age or older. The average household size was 2.80 and the average family size was 3.13.

In the town, the population was spread out, with 30.3% under the age of 18, 5.5% from 18 to 24, 33.7% from 25 to 44, 22.3% from 45 to 64, and 8.3% who were 65 years of age or older. The median age was 36 years. For every 100 females, there were 106.2 males. For every 100 females age 18 and over, there were 104.1 males.

The median income for a household in the town was $55,509, and the median income for a family was $59,688. Males had a median income of $41,200 versus $28,693 for females. The per capita income for the town was $21,865. About 1.5% of families and 2.2% of the population were below the poverty line, including 1.2% of those under age 18 and none of those age 65 or over.

== Notable people ==
- Samuel Dresser, farmer and member of the Wisconsin State Assembly, lived here
