= Pacific, Wisconsin =

- Town
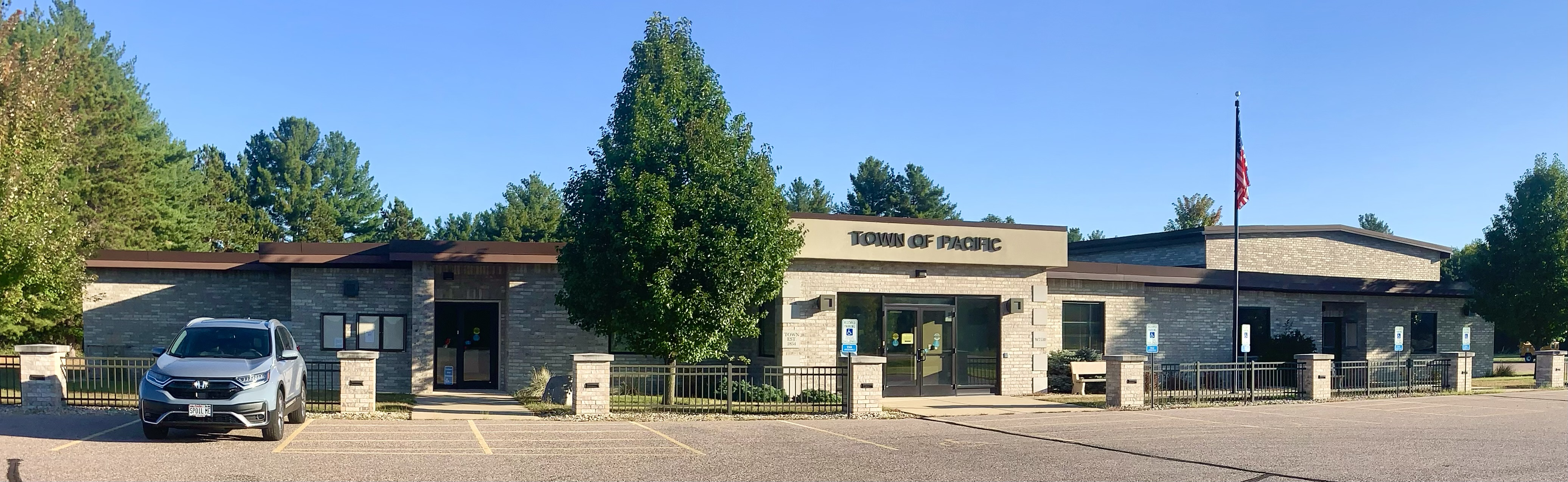
- Town hall

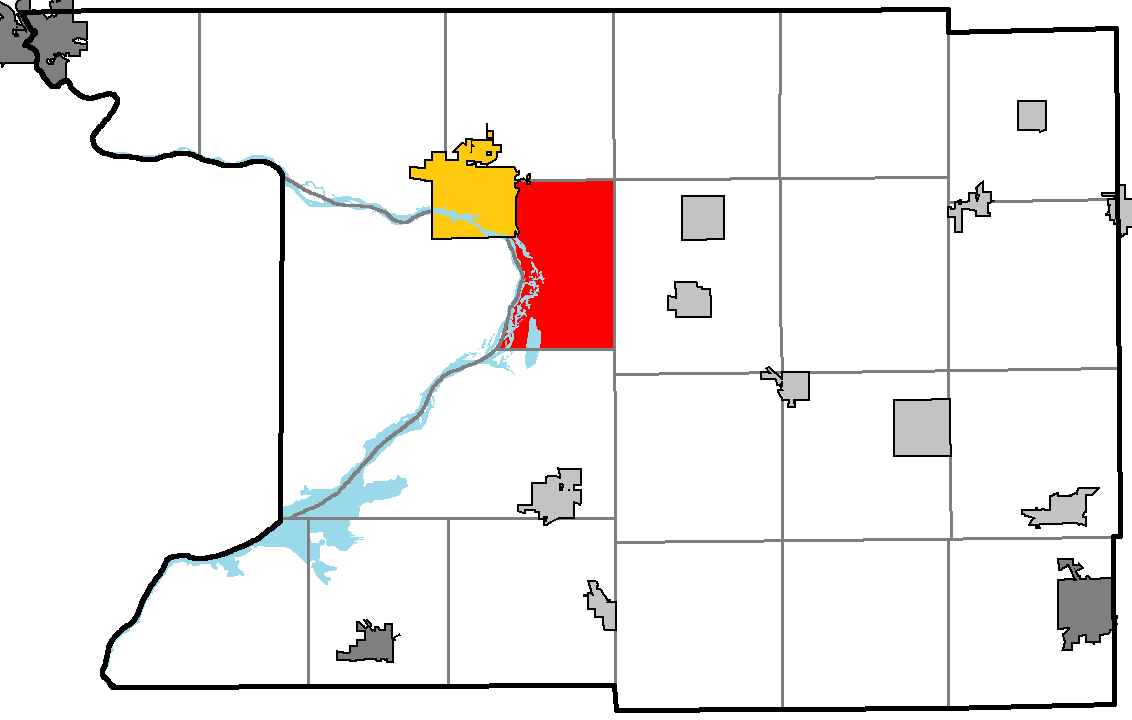
- Location of Pacific, within Columbia County, Wisconsin

- Location of Columbia County, Wisconsin
- Coordinates: 43°30′42″N 89°24′13″W
- Country: United States
- State: Wisconsin
- County: Columbia

Area
  - Total: 21.6 sq mi (55.9 km^{2})
  - Land: 20.3 sq mi (52.7 km^{2})
  - Water: 1.3 sq mi (3.3 km^{2})
- Elevation: 790 ft (240 m)

Population (2020)
  - Total: 2,791
  - Density: 137/sq mi (53.0/km^{2})
- Time zone: UTC-6 (Central (CST))
  - Summer (DST): UTC-5 (CDT)
- FIPS code: 55-60925
- GNIS feature ID: 1583887

Pacific is a town in Columbia County, Wisconsin, United States. The population was 2,791 at the 2020 census.

== History ==
Pacific was established in 1854 when it was sectioned off from the neighboring city of Portage. Its first elected official was N.H. Wood, the owner of a large portion of the land within the town's borders.

== Geography ==
According to the United States Census Bureau, the town has a total area of 21.6 square miles (55.9 km^{2}), of which 20.3 square miles (52.7 km^{2}) is land and 1.3 square miles (3.3 km^{2}) (5.88%) is water.

Over 2,000 acres (8.1 km^{2}) of the town are owned by the Wisconsin Department of Natural Resources, consisting mostly of the Swan Lake Wildlife Area.

== Demographics ==
As of the census of 2000, there were 2,518 people, 1,007 households, and 784 families residing in the town. The population density was 123.8 people per square mile (47.8/km^{2}). There were 1,108 housing units at an average density of 54.5 per square mile (21/km^{2}). The racial makeup of the town was 98.57% White, 0.08% African American, 0.08% Native American, 0.24% Asian, 0.12% from other races, and 0.91% from two or more races. Hispanic or Latino people of any race were 1.39% of the population.

There were 1,007 households, out of which 29.3% had children under the age of 18 living with them, 70.2% were married couples living together, 4.5% had a female householder with no husband present, and 22.1% were non-families. 17.6% of all households were made up of individuals, and 7.7% had someone living alone who was 65 years of age or older. The average household size was 2.5 and the average family size was 2.83.

In the town, the population was spread out, with 22.2% under the age of 18, 5.6% from 18 to 24, 26.2% from 25 to 44, 29.2% from 45 to 64, and 16.8% who were 65 years of age or older. The median age was 43 years. For every 100 females, there were 100.8 males. For every 100 females age 18 and over, there were 96.4 males.

The median income for a household in the town was $49,122, and the median income for a family was $54,318. Males had a median income of $40,250 versus $24,688 for females. The per capita income for the town was $22,489. About 4.9% of families and 4.9% of the population were below the poverty line, including 3.2% of those under age 18 and 5.6% of those age 65 or over.

== Economy ==
- The Columbia Energy Center is in the Town of Pacific.
