= John M. Evans (Wisconsin politician) =

19th century physician and politician

John M. Evans M.D.
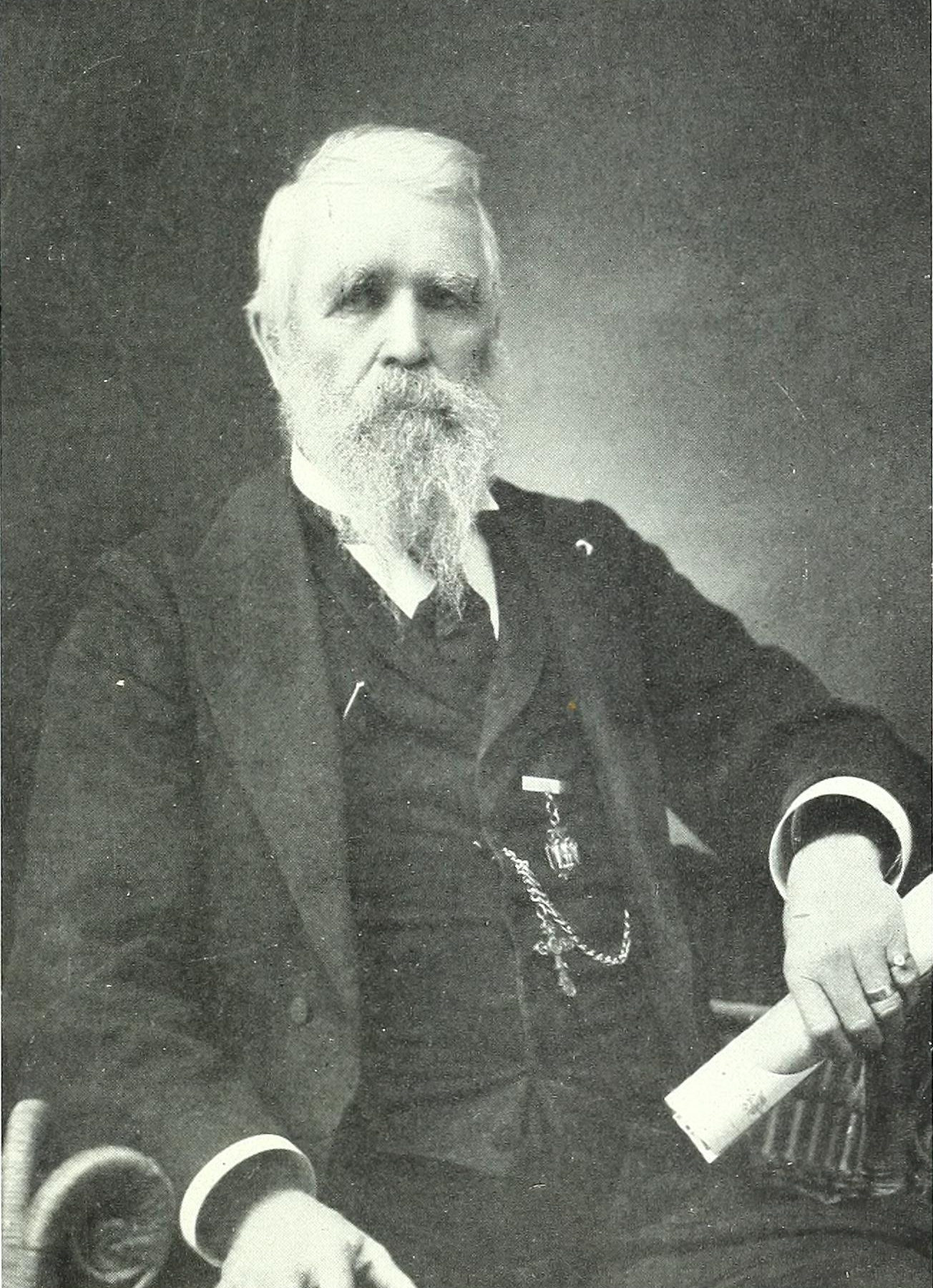

1st Mayor of Evansville, Wisconsin
- In office April 1896 – April 1897
- Preceded by: Position established

Member of the Wisconsin State Assembly
- In office January 6, 1873 – January 5, 1874
- Preceded by: Orlando F. Wallihan
- Succeeded by: Marvin Osborne
- Constituency: Rock 1st district
- In office January 7, 1856 – January 5, 1857
- Preceded by: Nathan B. Howard
- Succeeded by: William H. Tripp
- Constituency: Rock 4th district

Personal details
- Born: February 12, 1820 Addison, Vermont, U.S.
- Died: August 23, 1903 (aged 83) Evansville, Wisconsin, U.S.
- Resting place: Maple Hill Cemetery, Evansville, Wisconsin
- Party: Republican
- Spouse: Emma Clement (m. 1854; died 1899)
- Children: Elizabeth Emma (Griswold) (Cary)^{(b. 1855)}; Anna Penelope Evans^{(b. 1856; died 1858)}; John M. Evans, Jr.^{(b. 1859; died 1919)}
- Education: La Porte Medical College (M.D.)

Military service
- Allegiance: United States
- Branch/service: United States Volunteers; Union Army
- Years of service: 1861–1865
- Rank: Surgeon
- Unit: 13th Reg. Wis. Vol. Infantry
- Battles/wars: American Civil War

John M. Evans Sr., (February 12, 1820 – August 23, 1903) was an American physician, Republican politician, and Wisconsin pioneer. He is the namesake of Evansville, Wisconsin, in Rock County, and was the first mayor of that city. He also served two terms in the Wisconsin State Assembly and served as a Union Army surgeon during the American Civil War.

== Biography ==
Born in Addison, Vermont, Evans was one of five children of Calvin R. and Penelope Evans. When he was 13, his mother died. His father quickly remarried and moved to La Porte, Indiana, with his new wife. John became a ward of his maternal grandfather, Allen Goodrich, at Benson, Vermont. He received a public school education and, in 1838, went to reside with his father in La Porte, where he had become the proprietor of a hotel.

There, he trained as an apprentice carpenter for three years until chronic hip pain prevented him from working. A doctor advised him to seek a new career, and, in 1842, Evans began studying at the new La Porte Medical College, run by Dr. Daniel Meeker. In 1846, he earned his M.D. as a member of the first graduating class from the college.

Shortly after receiving his degree, Evans traveled to the Wisconsin Territory, joining a small frontier settlement in Rock County, then known as "The Grove". This would be his primary residence for the rest of his life. He was joined here by his father and stepmother in 1850. In 1848, an epidemic among the population caused a great deal of work for Dr. Evans as he rushed to treat people spread across the disparate homesteads of the area. His work won him great esteem among the residents, and, when a post office was established in the town, they named their settlement Evansville, in his honor.

From 1852 to 1855, Dr. Evans was also postmaster here. In 1855, he was elected representative of this part of Rock County to the Wisconsin State Assembly for the 9th Wisconsin Legislature.

At the outbreak of the American Civil War, in 1861, Dr. Evans volunteered for service and was enrolled as surgeon for the 13th Wisconsin Infantry Regiment. Dr. Evans served with the regiment through nearly the entire war, but was forced to resign due to health problems in 1865.

Following his Civil War service, Dr. Evans returned to Evansville, where he was elected to another term in the Assembly in 1872, and, when Evansville was incorporated as a city in 1896, he was elected the first Mayor.

Dr. Evans joined the Masons while living in La Porte, in 1841, and by the end of his life was one of the most prominent Masons in the state of Wisconsin. He was a member of several Masonic lodges throughout the southern part of the state, including the Tripoli Shrine Temple, in Milwaukee, and was grand high priest of the state in 1882 and 1883. In addition to his masonic activities, he was an avid member of the Episcopal Church, and was active in establishing the parish at Evansville, serving as senior warden from the time of its organization until his death.

He died at his home in Evansville in August 1903, at age 83. He continued his medical practice until just weeks before his death.

== Personal life and family ==
On June 1, 1854, Dr. Evans married Emma Clement at La Porte, Indiana. Together they had three children, though their second daughter, Anna Penelope, died in infancy. Their surviving children were Elizabeth Emma, who married D. C. Griswold, and later L. E. Cary, and John M. Evans Jr., who also became a physician and surgeon in Evansville. Mrs. Evans preceded Dr. Evans in death, in 1899.

A significant collection of his correspondence is archived with the Evansville Wisconsin Historical Society.

== Electoral history ==
=== Wisconsin Assembly (1872) ===
Wisconsin Assembly, Rock 1st District Election, 1872
Party	Candidate	Votes	%	±%
General Election, November 4, 1872
Republican	John M. Evans	822	59.39%	+2.28%
Democratic	David L. Mills	562	40.61%	
Plurality		260	18.79%	+4.55%
Total votes		1,384	100.0%	+28.74%
Republican hold				

Wisconsin State Assembly
Preceded by Nathan B. Howard	Member of the Wisconsin State Assembly from the Rock 4th district January 7, 1856 – January 5, 1857	Succeeded by William H. Tripp
Preceded by Orlando F. Wallihan	Member of the Wisconsin State Assembly from the Rock 1st district January 6, 1873 – January 5, 1874	Succeeded by Marvin Osborne
