= Daniel Hall (Wisconsin politician) =

19th century American politician

22nd Speaker of the Wisconsin State Assembly
- In office January 1, 1872 – January 6, 1873
- Preceded by: William E. Smith
- Succeeded by: Henry D. Barron

Member of the Wisconsin State Assembly from the Jefferson 1st district
- In office January 3, 1870 – January 6, 1873
- Preceded by: John Rutledge
- Succeeded by: Patrick Devy

District Attorney of Jefferson County, Wisconsin
- In office January 1, 1857 – January 1, 1859
- Preceded by: Lucien B. Caswell
- Succeeded by: Harlow Pease

Personal details
- Born: November 20, 1819 Greenwich, New York, U.S.
- Died: July 17, 1895 (aged 75) Watertown, Wisconsin, U.S.
- Resting place: Oak Hill Cemetery, Watertown
- Party: Republican
- Spouses: Elizabeth T. Flagler (m. 1846; died 1847); Lucy E. Newhall (m. 1852–1895)
- Children: Arthur D. Hall; (b. 1856; died 1883); Harriet Hall; (b. 1858; died 1858)
- Education: Union College
- Profession: Lawyer

Daniel Hall (November 20, 1819 – July 17, 1895) was an American lawyer, Republican politician, and Wisconsin pioneer. He was the 25th speaker of the Wisconsin State Assembly, and represented Jefferson County for three terms in the Assembly. Earlier in his career, he served as district attorney of Jefferson County from 1857 to 1859. Hall was largely responsible for shepherding an amendment to the state constitution to limit municipal indebtedness, responding to several local debt crises.

== Early life ==
Daniel Hall was born on November 20, 1819, in the town of Greenwich, New York. He was raised on his father's farm until age 18, when he entered the seminary at Lima, New York, to prepare for college. He went on to attend Union College in 1842 and graduated in 1845.

After graduating from college, Hall read law in the offices of Woods and Bowen, then in the office of Judge Gardner. He moved to the new state of Wisconsin in 1851, and was admitted to the bar in Milwaukee in August of that year. He moved west to Watertown, Wisconsin, a month later, where he remained for the rest of his life.

== Political career ==
Initially, Hall identified with the Whig Party, but became a Republican when that party was organized in 1854. He held his first public office in 1853, when he became the first city superintendent of schools after Watertown was incorporated as a city. In 1856, he was elected district attorney of Jefferson County, Wisconsin, and served a two-year term.

In the days after the outbreak of the American Civil War, Hall offered to pay $30,000 for the upkeep of Wisconsin's volunteer regiments in the Union Army (roughly $1,000,000 adjusted for inflation to 2024). After the bloody Battle of Shiloh, in April 1862, Wisconsin governor Louis P. Harvey traveled to the battlefield and summoned other Wisconsin men to come care for the wounded. Hall answered the call and traveled to the site. Governor Harvey died on his way back to Wisconsin.

In 1869, Hall was urged to run for Wisconsin State Assembly as an independent candidate to work in the Legislature to address Watertown's indebtedness. He won the election by 13 votes, and before being sworn in, he had already drafted a bill to address the city's bond issue and presented it to the city. Watertown's bond issue was not resolved in the 1870 term, but the city saw Hall as determined to continue work on the issue.

Hall ran for re-election in 1870 on the regular Republican Party ticket and won his second term in a landslide. In his second term, he was selected as chairman of the Assembly Judiciary Committee. Also during that term, he did further local service for his district, ensuring that all of the city of Watertown was united in a single Assembly district in the 1871 redistricting act (Watertown sits on the border of Jefferson and Dodge counties, so at various times has been split between districts along the county line). He was then elected to a third consecutive term that fall.

At the start of the 25th Wisconsin Legislature, the Republican caucus elected Hall as speaker. In that term, Hall pushed for a constitutional amendment prohibiting Wisconsin municipalities from issuing debt in excess of 5% of the taxable value of the property in the municipality, a proposal that was eventually ratified by voters in 1874. This was part of Hall's larger attempts to respond to Watertown's municipal indebtedness problem.

== Later years ==
In 1872, Hall was offered the Republican nomination for Wisconsin Senate in the 23rd Senate district. The 23rd district at the time comprised all of Jefferson County, which was at that time one of the most strongly Democratic counties in the state. Hall ultimately declined the nomination and did not run for public office again, devoting the rest of his working years to his legal career. His law partner of 20 years, Jacob J. Enos, died in 1874, and for much of the rest of his career, Hall partnered with Calvin B. Skinner in a firm known as Hall & Skinner.

Hall's most noteworthy case as a lawyer was a remnant of his legislative work. While he had been seeking legislative remedies for Watertown's municipal debt, he had also been retained as a lawyer for the city to fight off a lawsuit from one of the city's major creditors. The creditor, James R. Reese, had obtained several judgements from the U.S. district court ordering Watertown to repay the debt, and in 1872 sought an order from the federal court to empower the U.S. marshal to enforce a levy of the city's taxable property to satisfy the debt. Hall argued the case before a panel of two district judges, who disagreed on the ruling and thus did not order the levy. Rees then appealed his case to the Supreme Court of the United States. Hall traveled to Washington, D.C., to argue the case in February 1874, assisted by Henry L. Palmer and Matthew H. Carpenter. In the case Rees v. City of Watertown (86 U.S. 107), the Supreme Court ruled that it would not be within the constitutional power of the court to order the marshal to collect a municipal tax. This was not the end of Hall's work on behalf of the city in bond litigation. Cases continued for much of the rest of his legal career.

Hall fractured his hip on August 25, 1893, in a fall at his home, and the fracture never fully healed. He was essentially crippled after that time, and by early 1895 the injury caused him intense pain caused him to withdraw from the public. He died at his home in Watertown on July 17, 1895.

== Personal life and family ==
Daniel Hall was one of at least six sons born to Titus Hall and his wife Sarah (née Sybrandt). The Halls were descended from John Hall, one of the founders of Hartford, Connecticut.

Daniel Hall married twice. His first wife was Elizabeth T. Flagler of Lockport, New York; they were married in June 1846, but she died less than a year later on May 24, 1847. On September 1, 1852, Hall married Lucy B. Newhall, also from Lockport. They were married for 43 years until his death in 1895; they had two children, though both died young.

== Electoral history ==
=== Wisconsin Assembly (1869, 1870, 1871) ===
Year	Election	Date	Elected				Defeated				Total	Plurality
1869	General	Nov. 2	Daniel Hall	Ind. Republican	629	50.52%	Frank P. Brook	Dem.	616	49.48%	1,245	13
1870	General	Nov. 5	Daniel Hall (inc)	Republican	848	60.27%	Francis Smith	Dem.	559	39.73%	1,407	289
1871	General	Nov. 7	Daniel Hall (inc)	Republican	1,182	69.61%	Frank P. Brook	Dem.	516	30.39%	1,698	666

Wisconsin State Assembly
Preceded by John Rutledge	Member of the Wisconsin State Assembly from the Jefferson 1st district January 3, 1870 – January 6, 1873	Succeeded by Patrick Devy
Preceded by William E. Smith	Speaker of the Wisconsin State Assembly; January 1, 1872 – January 6, 1873	Succeeded by Henry D. Barron
Legal offices
Preceded by Lucien B. Caswell	District Attorney of Jefferson County, Wisconsin; January 1, 1857 – January 1, 1859	Succeeded by Harlow Pease
