= Fred A. Fredrich =

American politician

Fred A. Fredrich (August 23, 1870 – October 9, 1954) was an American farmer and politician.

He was born in the town of Maple Grove, Manitowoc County, Wisconsin, and owned a farm near Reedsville, Wisconsin, in the town of Maple Grove. Fredrich was also president of the Rockland Insurance Company. Fredrich served in the following capacities: as chairman of the Maple Grove Town Board; as the school district clerk; on the Manitowoc County Board of Supervisor from 1920 until his retirement in 1951. Here, he also served as chairman of the county board. From 1923 to 1927, he served in the Wisconsin State Assembly as a Republican.

Fredrich died in a hospital in Green Bay, Wisconsin after a long illness.
