= Patrick H. O'Rourk =

American politician (1847–1923)

Member of the Wisconsin Senate from the 1st district
- In office January 6, 1873 – January 4, 1875
- Preceded by: John H. Jones
- Succeeded by: Enos Eastman

Member of the Wisconsin State Assembly from the Sheboygan 2nd district
- In office January 1, 1872 – January 6, 1873
- Preceded by: Enos Eastman
- Succeeded by: Otto Puhlman

Personal details
- Born: August 28, 1847 Granville, Wisconsin, U.S.
- Died: October 6, 1923 (aged 76) Gordon, Nebraska, U.S.
- Resting place: Gordon Cemetery, Gordon, Nebraska
- Party: Democratic
- Spouse: Sarah Ellen Ashcraft (m. 1906–1923)
- Children: Sarah Jane (Hewett); (b. 1907; died 2008)
- Education: University of Wisconsin Law School (LL.B.)
- Profession: Lawyer

Patrick Henry O'Rourk (August 28, 1847 – October 6, 1923) was an American lawyer, Democratic politician, and pioneer of western Nebraska. Before going to Nebraska, he served two years in the Wisconsin Senate (1873, 1874), and one year in the Wisconsin State Assembly (1872), representing Sheboygan County, Wisconsin.

== Early life ==
O'Rourk was born on August 28, 1847, the son of Irish immigrants; he was born in what was then the town of Granville, Wisconsin. As a child, in 1849, he moved with his parents to a farm in the town of Lyndon, Sheboygan County, Wisconsin.

After completing his primary education, he taught school in the Lyndon area to raise money for higher education. He went on to attend the University of Wisconsin Law School, and while in Madison read law in the offices of Stevens & Flower. He received his LL.B., and was admitted to the bar in 1869.

== Career ==
In 1871, O'Rourk was the Democratic Party nominee for Wisconsin State Assembly in Sheboygan County's 2nd Assembly district, which then comprised the northwest quadrant of the county. He won the election and represented the district in the 1872 term.

The following election, O'Rourk was nominated for Wisconsin Senate, in the 1st Senate district, which then comprised all of Sheboygan County. O'Rourk defeated his Republican opponent, former state senator John A. Bentley, receiving 53% of the vote.

O'Rourk did not run for re-election in 1874, and instead moved to Milwaukee to focus on his legal practice. Around this time, he traveled through the West Indies, Australia, and the western United States, and made his first visit to the Platte River valley, where he would later settle. He later moved to Kansas, where he became an attorney for the Union Pacific Railroad.

In 1893, he moved to Gordon, Nebraska, which would be his primary residence for the rest of his life. In Nebraska, he became an attorney for the railroad businessman John Fitzgerald. He continued his legal practice nearly up to the date of his death. O'Rourke died at his home in Gordon on October 6, 1923, after a year of health difficulties.

== Personal life and family ==
Patrick O'Rourk was the eldest of at least 12 children born to Irish American immigrants Michael O'Rourk (1819–1874) and Elizabeth (née Rogers; 1820–1893). Both of O'Rourk's parents had emigrated to the United States as children, they met and married in Syracuse, New York, before moving to Milwaukee County.

In 1906, Patrick O'Rourk married Sarah Ellen Yockey (née Ashcraft; 1862–1953). They had one daughter together, Sarah Jane, and Sarah also brought one young child from her previous marriage and had at least two other older children.

== Electoral history ==
=== Wisconsin Assembly (1871) ===
Wisconsin Assembly, Sheboygan 2nd District Election, 1871
Party	Candidate	Votes	%	±%
General Election, November 7, 1871
Democratic	Patrick H. O'Rourk	829	59.51%	
Republican	Asa Carpenter	564	40.49%	
Plurality		265	19.02%	
Total votes		1,393	100.0%	
Democratic hold				

=== Wisconsin Senate (1872) ===
Wisconsin Senate, 1st District Election, 1872
Party	Candidate	Votes	%	±%
General Election, November 5, 1872
Democratic	Patrick H. O'Rourk	2,999	53.02%	+6.43pp
Republican	John A. Bentley	2,657	46.98%	
Plurality		342	6.05%	-0.76pp
Total votes		5,656	100.0%	+16.04%
Democratic gain from Republican				

Wisconsin State Assembly
Preceded by Enos Eastman	Member of the Wisconsin State Assembly from the Sheboygan 2nd district January 1, 1872 – January 6, 1873	Succeeded by Otto Puhlman
Wisconsin Senate
Preceded by John H. Jones	Member of the Wisconsin Senate from the 1st district January 6, 1873 – January 4, 1875	Succeeded by Enos Eastman
