= Samuel Dresser =

American politician

Samuel B. Dresser (November 23, 1831 – November 20, 1901) was an American businessman, farmer and politician.

== Background ==
Born in Bangor, Maine, Dresser received a public school education, and became a farmer. He moved to Taylors Falls, Minnesota Territory in 1851 and was in the lumber and merchant business. Dresser moved to a farm in a part of the township of Osceola, in Polk County, Wisconsin called Osceola Prairie, in 1862.

== Public office ==
Dresser was elected as a Republican to the Wisconsin State Assembly seat representing Ashland, Barron, Bayfield, Burnett, Douglas and Polk Counties for the 1870 session, with 620 votes against 305 for Democrat V. M. Babcock, replacing fellow Republican Henry D. Barron, who had just been appointed auditor of the United States Treasury. He was assigned to the standing committees on lumber and manufactures, and on legislative expenditures, chairing the latter. He was not a candidate for re-election in 1870, and was succeeded by another Republican, Samuel S. Vaughn. Dresser was sheriff of Polk County in 1877 and 1878. By the time of his death, he had also served in various town government offices in Osceola for a quarter of a century.

== Death and heritage ==
In 1871, he was appointed Deputy Lumber Agent for the St. Croix-Lake Superior railroad grant lands. He would spend some time acting to protect the timberlands of this district.

Dresser died in Osceola on November 20, 1901. Dresser had donated land for a railroad; when the area became a community, it was first called Dresser Junction and later simply Dresser, Wisconsin.
