= Otto Puhlman =

American politician (1837-1924)

1st, 3rd, & 5th Mayor of Plymouth, Wisconsin
- In office April 1883 – April 1886
- Preceded by: Joseph W. Dow
- Succeeded by: C. F. Albrecht
- In office April 1879 – April 1882
- Preceded by: Henry H. Huson
- Succeeded by: Joseph W. Dow
- In office May 1877 – April 1878
- Preceded by: Position established
- Succeeded by: Henry H. Huson

Member of the Wisconsin State Assembly from the Sheboygan 2nd district
- In office January 6, 1873 – January 5, 1874
- Preceded by: Patrick H. O'Rourk
- Succeeded by: Samuel Decius Hubbard

Personal details
- Born: June 12, 1837 Görzke, Brandenburg, Kingdom of Prussia
- Died: April 26, 1924 (aged 86) Sawtelle, California, U.S.
- Resting place: Union Cemetery, Plymouth, Wisconsin
- Party: Democratic
- Spouse: Anna T. Moore (died 1910)
- Children: Rudolph Puhlmann^{(b. 1867; died 1870)}; Grace Anna (Seymour)^{(b. 1870; died 1961)}; Alice Puhlmann^{(b. 1872; died 1894)}; Jessie Puhlmann^{(b. 1875; died 1876)}; Robert Newton Puhlman^{(b. 1877; died 1957)}; Clarence M. Puhlman^{(b. 1878; died 1928)}
- Education: Heidelberg University
- Occupation: Businessman

Military service
- Allegiance: United States
- Branch/service: United States Volunteers; Union Army
- Years of service: 1861–1865
- Rank: Captain, USV
- Unit: 4th Reg. Wis. Vol. Infantry; 19th Reg. Wis. Vol. Infantry
- Battles/wars: American Civil War

Otto Puhlman (June 12, 1837 – April 26, 1924) was a German American businessman and Democratic politician. He was the first mayor of Plymouth, Wisconsin, and served six additional terms as mayor. He represented much of western Sheboygan County in the Wisconsin State Assembly during the 1873 session. Earlier, he served as a Union Army officer in the American Civil War.

== Biography ==
Otto Pulman was born in Görzke, in what is now eastern Germany. At the time of his birth, it was the Province of Brandenburg in the Kingdom of Prussia. He was raised and educated there, and attended Heidelberg University. In 1859, Puhlman emigrated to the United States and settled in Plymouth, Wisconsin, where he started a flour mill.

At the outbreak of the American Civil War, Puhlman was among the first volunteers for the Union Army from Wisconsin. He was enrolled as a sergeant in Co. C of the 4th Wisconsin Infantry Regiment and served with that regiment through the first year of the war, on garrison duty in Maryland. In February 1862, he was commissioned second lieutenant of Co. G in the 19th Wisconsin Infantry Regiment and returned to Wisconsin for the organization of that regiment.

The 19th Wisconsin Infantry was assigned to guard Confederate prisoners at Camp Randall until May 1862, and then headed to Washington, D.C., in June for service in the eastern theater of the war. They were assigned to the Union garrison at Norfolk, Virginia, and participated in several of the sieges and battles along Virginia's Atlantic coast. In the Spring of 1864, they were assigned to XVIII Corps and proceeded up the James River to join the Siege of Petersburg. After nine months entrenched around Petersburg and Richmond, Virginia, they took the cities in April 1865, and were then assigned to garrison duty in northern Virginia until the end of the war. Puhlman was promoted to first lieutenant in June 1863, and captain in April 1864.

During the American Civil War, Puhlman served in the 19th Wisconsin Volunteer Infantry Regiment. Puhlman served as mayor of Plymouth, Wisconsin. In 1873, Puhlman served in the Wisconsin State Assembly and was a Democrat. In 1885, Puhlman sold his business and moved to Sanborn, Iowa, where he started a new mill. In 1887, Puhlman moved to Chicago, Illinois, and worked for the Chicago & Northwestern Railway Company until 1912. Puhlman died at a soldiers sanitarium in Sawtelle, California. He was buried in Plymouth, Wisconsin.

Wisconsin State Assembly
Preceded by Patrick H. O'Rourk	Member of the Wisconsin State Assembly from the Sheboygan 2nd district January 6, 1873 – January 5, 1874	Succeeded by Samuel Decius Hubbard
Political offices
New city government	Mayor of Plymouth, Wisconsin; May 1877 – April 1878	Succeeded by Henry H. Huson
Preceded by Henry H. Huson	Mayor of Plymouth, Wisconsin; April 1879 – April 1882	Succeeded by Joseph W. Dow
Preceded by Joseph W. Dow	Mayor of Plymouth, Wisconsin; April 1883 – April 1886	Succeeded by C. F. Albrecht
