= Jerome Bonaparte Cory =

American politician

Jerome Bonaparte Cory (June 17, 1837 – January 23, 1892) was a member of the Wisconsin State Assembly.

== Biography ==
Cory was born on June 17, 1837, in Greene Township, Trumbull County, Ohio. Following the outbreak of the American Civil War, he initially enlisted with the 19th Ohio Infantry of the Union Army and took part in events that include the Battle of Rich Mountain. Later, he settled in Patch Grove (town), Wisconsin, and served as an Army surgeon past the end of the war. Cory married Amanda McLean. They had nine children. He died on January 23, 1892.

== Assembly career ==
Cory was a member of the Assembly during the 1872 session. He was a Republican.
