= Thomas Duncan Grimmer =

American politician

Thomas Duncan Grimmer (March 27, 1828 – September 8, 1893) was a member of the Wisconsin State Assembly.

== Biography ==
Grimmer was born on March 27, 1828, in Charlotte County, New Brunswick, sources have differed on the exact location. He married Frances C. Cook on December 21, 1857.

== Career ==
Grimmer was a member of the Assembly in 1872. He was a Republican.
