= Maple Grove, Manitowoc County, Wisconsin =

Maple Grove, Wisconsin
- Town
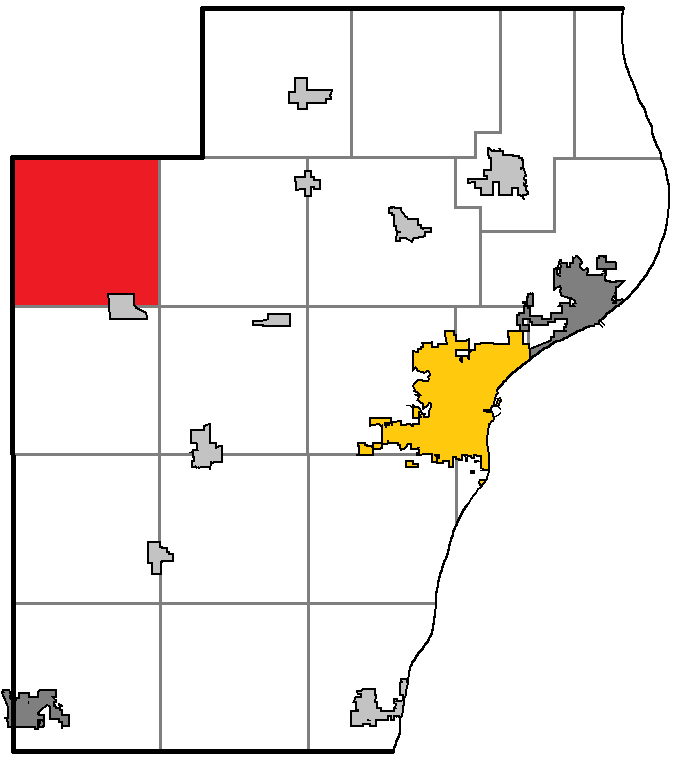
- Location of Maple Grove, within Manitowoc County
- Coordinates: 44°12′7″N 87°59′5″W
- Country: United States
- State: Wisconsin
- County: Manitowoc

Area
  - Total: 35.4 sq mi (91.7 km^{2})
  - Land: 35.4 sq mi (91.7 km^{2})
  - Water: 0 sq mi (0.0 km^{2})
- Elevation: 863 ft (263 m)

Population (2020)
  - Total: 773
  - Density: 21.8/sq mi (8.43/km^{2})
- Time zone: UTC-6 (Central (CST))
  - Summer (DST): UTC-5 (CDT)
- Area code: 920
- FIPS code: 55-48875
- GNIS feature ID: 1583643
- Website: https://maplegrovewi.gov/

Maple Grove is a town in Manitowoc County, Wisconsin, United States. The population was 773 at the 2020 census.

== Geography ==
According to the United States Census Bureau, the town has a total area of 35.4 square miles (91.7 km^{2}), all land.

== Demographics ==
As of the census of 2000, there were 852 people, 287 households, and 227 families residing in the town. The population density was 24.1 people per square mile (9.3/km^{2}). There were 308 housing units at an average density of 8.7 per square mile (3.4/km^{2}). The racial makeup of the town was 98.59% White, 0.35% Native American, 0.12% Asian, 0.23% from other races, and 0.70% from two or more races. Hispanic or Latino people of any race were 0.35% of the population.

There were 287 households, out of which 38.7% had children under the age of 18 living with them, 71.4% were married couples living together, 2.8% had a female householder with no husband present, and 20.6% were non-families. 16.7% of all households were made up of individuals, and 6.6% had someone living alone who was 65 years of age or older. The average household size was 2.97 and the average family size was 3.38.

In the town, the population was spread out, with 30.0% under the age of 18, 8.5% from 18 to 24, 30.5% from 25 to 44, 22.2% from 45 to 64, and 8.8% who were 65 years of age or older. The median age was 35 years. For every 100 females, there were 115.2 males. For every 100 females age 18 and over, there were 119.9 males.

The median income for a household in the town was $51,071, and the median income for a family was $57,656. Males had a median income of $34,083 versus $23,281 for females. The per capita income for the town was $21,734. About 0.9% of families and 2.3% of the population were below the poverty line, including 2.6% of those under age 18 and none of those age 65 or over.

== Notable people ==
- Fred A. Fredrich, Wisconsin State Representative, was born in the town
- Fred C. Maertz, Wisconsin State Representative, lived in the town
- Martin McNamara, Wisconsin State Representative, lived in the town
