= Casper Steinfort =

19th century American politician

Member of the Wisconsin State Assembly from the Jefferson 2nd district
- In office January 6, 1873 – January 5, 1874
- Preceded by: William Lawrence Hoskins
- Succeeded by: Austin Kellogg

Personal details
- Born: December 21, 1814 Dortmund, Grand Duchy of Berg
- Died: February 9, 1899 (aged 84) Lake Mills, Wisconsin, U.S.
- Resting place: Rock Lake Cemetery, Lake Mills, Wisconsin
- Party: Liberal Republican (1873)
- Spouse: Henriette Oberstewilms (died 1895)
- Children: Charles Steinfort^{(died 1917)}; Mary (Brignitz)^{(died after 1899)}; Henry Steinfort^{(b. 1847; died 1930)}; Alvina (Brennecke)^{(b. 1855; died 1912)}
- Occupation: Farmer

Casper Heinrich Steinfort (December 21, 1814 – February 9, 1899) was a German American immigrant, farmer, and Wisconsin pioneer. He was a member of the Wisconsin State Assembly during the 1873 session, representing northwest Jefferson County as a Liberal Republican.

== Biography ==
Casper Steinfort was born on December 21, 1814, in the city of Dortmund in what is now western Germany. Dortmund was then part of the Grand Duchy of Berg, but shortly after his birth it was absorbed into the Province of Westphalia, in the Kingdom of Prussia. He was raised and educated in his native city and was employed as superintendent of a silk manufactory for several years there.

He emigrated to the United States in 1848, coming directly to the town of Waterloo, Wisconsin, in Jefferson County. During the American Civil War, he served as a local recruiting officer for the Union Army.

He moved to the neighboring town of Lake Mills, Wisconsin, in 1867, where he was chairman of the town board for several years and served on the county board of supervisors.

He was elected to the Wisconsin State Assembly in 1872, running as a Liberal Republican. This made him a member of the Reform Party—a short-lived coalition among Wisconsin Democrats, Liberal Republicans, and other reformers. He served in the 26th Wisconsin Legislature and did not run for re-election in 1873. In the Legislature, he served on the committee on state lands.

== Personal life and family ==
Casper Steinfort married Henriette Oberstewilms when they were living in Prussia. They had three children before emigrating to the United States, and had at least one more after locating in Wisconsin.

After his term in the Legislature, he moved to Watertown, Wisconsin, but returned to Lake Mills after the death of his wife in 1895. He died at Lake Mills on February 9, 1899.

== Electoral history ==
=== Wisconsin Assembly (1872) ===
Wisconsin Assembly, Jefferson 2nd District Election, 1872
Party	Candidate	Votes	%	±%
General Election, November 5, 1872
Liberal Republican	Casper Steinfort	1,151	55.02%	
Republican	C. P. Mead	941	44.98%	−0.15%
Plurality		210	10.04%	+0.31%
Total votes		2,092	100.0%	+79.88%
Liberal Republican gain from Democratic				

Wisconsin State Assembly
Preceded by William Lawrence Hoskins	Member of the Wisconsin State Assembly from the Jefferson 2nd district January 6, 1873 – January 5, 1874	Succeeded by Austin Kellogg
