= Michael Gorman (Wisconsin politician) =

American politician

Michael Gorman (December 1816 – April 1, 1899) was a member of the Wisconsin State Assembly.

Gorman was born in County Kildare, Ireland in 1816. In 1844, he married Catherine Smith. They had nine children before her death on January 22, 1890. In 1856, Gorman settled on what became his farm in Lebanon, Waupaca County, Wisconsin.

Gorman was elected to the Assembly in 1872. He was a Democrat.
