= Swan Lake Wildlife Area =

State Wildlife Area in Columbia County, Wisconsin

- Swan Lake State Wildlife Area
- IUCN category V (protected landscape/seascape)
- Location within Wisconsin Location within the United States
- Location: Columbia County, Wisconsin
- Nearest city: Columbus, WI
- Coordinates: 43°32′3.9″N 89°23′48.4″W
- Area: 2,466 acres (9.98 km^{2})
- Established: 1963
- Governing body: Wisconsin Department of Natural Resources

The Swan Lake Wildlife Area is a 2,466 acres (998 ha) tract of protected land located in Columbia County, Wisconsin, managed by the Wisconsin Department of Natural Resources (WDNR). Land to be used for the wildlife area was first acquired in 1963 to provide for hunting and other outdoor recreational activities in the county. In addition to outdoor recreation activities, the wildlife area was established to protect the Fox River watershed.

== Swan Lake ==
The lake for which the wildlife area is named after has an area of 407 acres (165 ha) and has a maximum depth of 82 feet (25.0 m) with an average depth of 32 feet (9.8 m). The Lake is made up of 55% muck, 30% sand and 15% gravel. There is a single boat jetty that provides boating access to the Lake.

There are five different invasive species present in the Lake; the curly-leaf pondweed, eurasian water-milfoil, Japanese knotweed, purple loosestrife and zebra mussel. In addition to these invasive plants and animals, while not invasive, the Lake and surrounding Wildlife Area are dominated by large swathes of cattail marshes.

There are ten different types of cover in the wildlife area, including aspen, bottomland hardwood, developed, grassland, marsh, oak, shrub wetland, tamarack, upland conifer and the most common, Emergent Wetland.

Cover type acreage
Cover type	Acres	Percentage cover
Aspen	150	6%
Bottomland hardwood	50	2%
Developed	4	<1%
Emergent wetland	1,227	50%
Grassland	90	4%
Marsh	500	20%
Oak	190	7%
Shrub wetland	230	9%
Tamarack	20	1%
Upland conifer	5	<1%
Total acreage	2,466	100%

== Flora and fauna ==
There are several different types of trees residing in the wildlife area, the most prominent being oak, maple, hemlock, and red pine. In addition to the varied flora, in both Swan Lake and the surrounding marshland, musky, Northern pike, largemouth bass, walleye and northern pike are commonly found. Besides sea dwelling fauna, black tern, turkey and shorebirds have been known to frequent the area.

Other flora besides trees include bur-reed, common reed grass, various bulrush, pickerel-weed and wild rice.

== See also ==
- Porcupine Lake Wilderness
