= George Cowie (politician) =

American politician

George Cowie (August 25, 1828 – February 17, 1904) was an American farmer and politician.

Born in Edinburgh, Scotland, Cowie was a miner. In 1848, he emigrated to the United States and settled in Pottsville, Pennsylvania, where he continued to work as a miner. From 1850 to 1851, he lived in California, returning to Pottsville in 1851. In 1855, Cowie moved to Wisconsin and settled in Buffalo County, Wisconsin, where he had a farm. He helped set up the town of Glencoe, Wisconsin, which was named for the region in Scotland where Cowie's family came from. Cowie was the chairman of the Glencoe Town Board and was the postmaster of Glencoe. He also served on the Buffalo County Board of Supervisors. After defeating Republican candidate John Hauser in 1871, in 1872 Cowie served in the Wisconsin State Assembly and was the first Democrat. In 1894, he retired and moved with his wife to Arcadia, Wisconsin. Cowie died on February 17, 1904, in Longmont, Colorado, while visiting a daughter.
