= Columbus Caldwell =

American farmer and politician

Columbus Caldwell (September 25, 1830 – December 18, 1908) was an American farmer and politician.

Born in Charlotte, Chautauqua County, New York, Caldwell moved with his parents to Wisconsin Territory in 1836. Caldwell settled first in Kenosha, Wisconsin and then Rochester, Wisconsin. In 1849, Caldwell finally settled in Lind, Wisconsin. During the American Civil War, Caldwell enlisted in the 1st Wisconsin Volunteer Cavalry Regiment as a private. Caldwell served in the Lind Town Board and served as chairman of the town board. He also served as Waupaca County register of deeds and was a Republican. In 1873 and 1874, Caldwell served in the Wisconsin State Assembly. He was appointed the first commandant of the soldiers house at Waupaca, Wisconsin. Caldwell died in Waupaca, Wisconsin.
