= Courtland, Wisconsin =

- Town
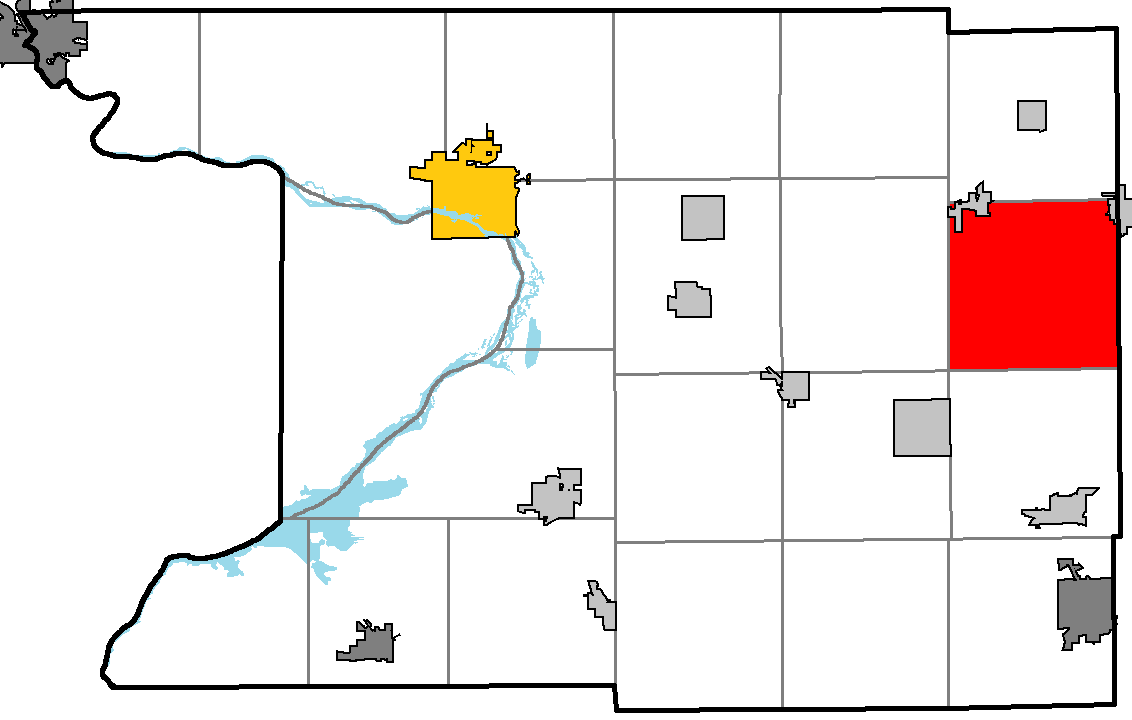
- Location of Courtland, within Columbia County, Wisconsin

- Location of Columbia County, Wisconsin
- Coordinates: 43°29′54″N 89°3′55″W
- Country: United States
- State: Wisconsin
- County: Columbia

Area
  - Total: 35.3 sq mi (91.5 km^{2})
  - Land: 35.2 sq mi (91.2 km^{2})
  - Water: 0.15 sq mi (0.4 km^{2})
- Elevation: 912 ft (278 m)

Population (2020)
  - Total: 491
  - Density: 13.9/sq mi (5.38/km^{2})
- Time zone: UTC-6 (Central (CST))
  - Summer (DST): UTC-5 (CDT)
- FIPS code: 55-17325
- GNIS feature ID: 1583022
- Website: https://www.courtlandtownship.com/

Courtland is a town in Columbia County, Wisconsin, United States. The population was 491 at the 2020 census.

== Geography ==
According to the United States Census Bureau, the town has a total area of 35.3 square miles (91.5 km^{2}), of which 35.2 square miles (91.2 km^{2}) is land and 0.2 square mile (0.4 km^{2}) (0.42%) is water.

== Demographics ==
As of the census of 2000, there were 463 people, 175 households, and 135 families residing in the town. The population density was 13.2 people per square mile (5.1/km^{2}). There were 185 housing units at an average density of 5.3 per square mile (2/km^{2}). The racial makeup of the town was 98.92% White, 0.22% Native American, 0.22% Asian, 0.65% from other races. Hispanic or Latino people of any race were 0.65% of the population.

There were 175 households, out of which 30.9% had children under the age of 18 living with them, 69.7% were married couples living together, 5.1% had a female householder with no husband present, and 22.3% were non-families. 21.1% of all households were made up of individuals, and 10.9% had someone living alone who was 65 years of age or older. The average household size was 2.65 and the average family size was 3.04.

In the town, the population was spread out, with 24.6% under the age of 18, 7.3% from 18 to 24, 27.2% from 25 to 44, 27.2% from 45 to 64, and 13.6% who were 65 years of age or older. The median age was 39 years. For every 100 females, there were 125.9 males. For every 100 females age 18 and over, there were 125.2 males.

The median income for a household in the town was $42,396, and the median income for a family was $44,375. Males had a median income of $29,375 versus $19,375 for females. The per capita income for the town was $18,355. About 6.7% of families and 7.2% of the population were below the poverty line, including 12.3% of those under age 18 and 2.5% of those age 65 or over.
