= Glencoe, Wisconsin =

- Town
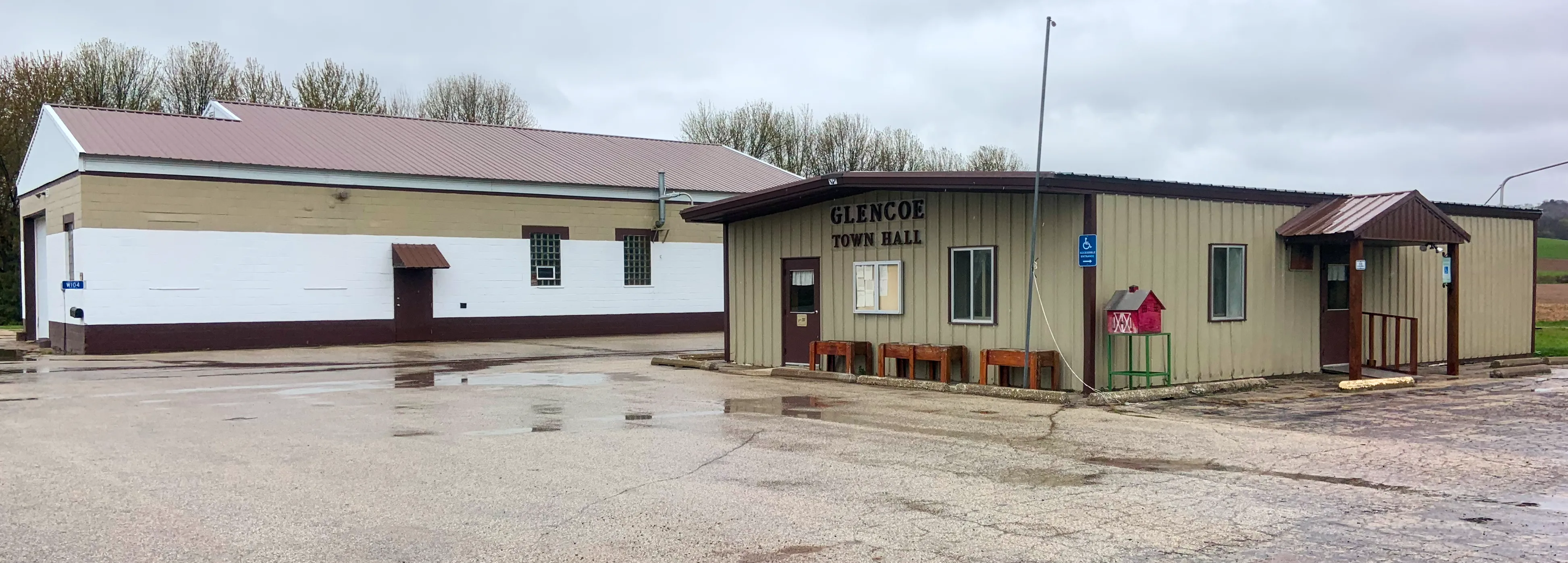
- Glencoe Town Hall

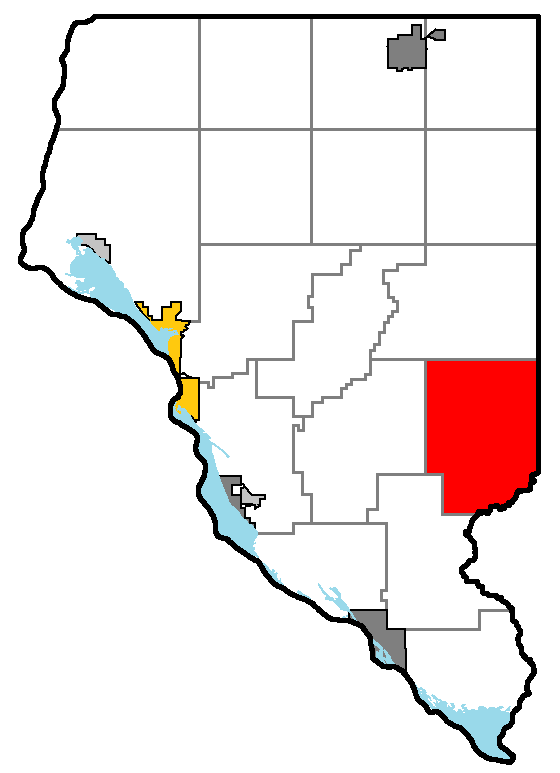
- Location of Glencoe, Buffalo County

- Location of Buffalo County, Wisconsin
- Coordinates: 44°16′31″N 91°35′42″W
- Country: United States
- State: Wisconsin
- County: Buffalo

Area
  - Total: 44.7 sq mi (115.7 km^{2})
  - Land: 44.5 sq mi (115.2 km^{2})
  - Water: 0.19 sq mi (0.5 km^{2})
- Elevation: 1,024 ft (312 m)

Population (2020)
  - Total: 402
  - Density: 9.04/sq mi (3.49/km^{2})
- Time zone: UTC-6 (Central (CST))
  - Summer (DST): UTC-5 (CDT)
- FIPS code: 55-29375
- GNIS feature ID: 1583280

Glencoe is a town in Buffalo County in the U.S. state of Wisconsin. The population was 402 at the 2020 census. The unincorporated community of Glencoe is located in the town.

== Geography ==
According to the United States Census Bureau, the town has a total area of 44.7 square miles (115.7 km^{2}), of which 44.5 square miles (115.2 km^{2}) is land and 0.19 square miles (0.5 km^{2}), or 0.42%, is water.

== Demographics ==
As of the census of 2000, there were 478 people, 171 households, and 133 families residing in the town. The population density was 10.7 people per square mile (4.1/km^{2}). There were 180 housing units at an average density of 4.0 per square mile (1.6/km^{2}). The racial makeup of the town was 99.58% White, and 0.42% from two or more races. Hispanic or Latino of any race were 0.42% of the population.

There were 171 households, out of which 38.6% had children under the age of 18 living with them, 70.2% were married couples living together, 5.3% had a female householder with no husband present, and 22.2% were non-families. 20.5% of all households were made up of individuals, and 5.3% had someone living alone who was 65 years of age or older. The average household size was 2.80 and the average family size was 3.23.

In the town, the population was spread out, with 28.9% under the age of 18, 6.5% from 18 to 24, 29.7% from 25 to 44, 26.4% from 45 to 64, and 8.6% who were 65 years of age or older. The median age was 37 years. For every 100 females, there were 111.5 males. For every 100 females age 18 and over, there were 112.5 males.

The median income for a household in the town was $36,750, and the median income for a family was $42,375. Males had a median income of $26,000 versus $19,750 for females. The per capita income for the town was $15,315. About 4.7% of families and 5.3% of the population were below the poverty line, including 2.1% of those under age 18 and 8.0% of those age 65 or over.

== Notable people ==
- George Cowie, lived in the town and helped organized the town
