= Henry D. Barron =

19th-century American politician

The Honorable Henry D. Barron
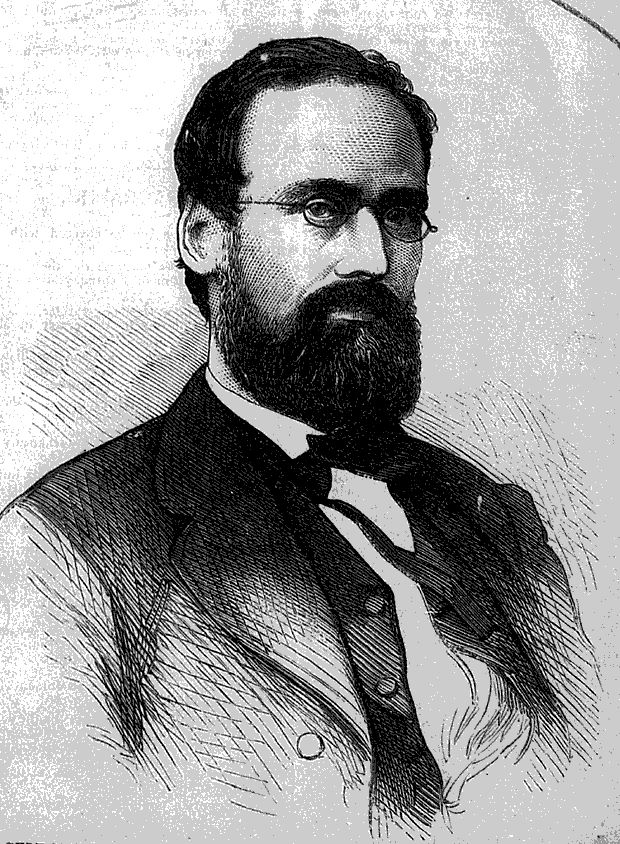

Wisconsin Circuit Court Judge for the 11th circuit
- In office July 1876 – January 22, 1882
- Preceded by: Solon H. Clough
- Succeeded by: Solon H. Clough

Wisconsin Circuit Court Judge for the 8th circuit
- In office July 1860 – January 1, 1861
- Appointed by: Alexander Randall
- Preceded by: S. S. N. Fuller
- Succeeded by: Lucien P. Wetherby

17th & 23rd Speaker of the Wisconsin State Assembly
- In office January 8, 1873 – January 14, 1874
- Preceded by: Daniel Hall
- Succeeded by: Gabriel Bouck
- In office January 10, 1866 – January 9, 1867
- Preceded by: William W. Field
- Succeeded by: Angus Cameron

Member of the Wisconsin Senate from the 24th district
- In office January 1, 1874 – July 1876
- Preceded by: Joseph E. Irish
- Succeeded by: Sam S. Fifield

Member of the Wisconsin State Assembly from the Ashland–Barron–Bayfield–Burnett–Douglas–Polk district
- In office January 1, 1872 – January 1, 1874
- Preceded by: Samuel S. Vaughn
- Succeeded by: Sam S. Fifield
- In office January 1, 1866 – January 1, 1870
- Preceded by: Albert C. Stuntz
- Succeeded by: Samuel B. Dresser

Member of the Wisconsin State Assembly from the Ashland–Burnett–Dallas–Douglas–La Pointe–Polk district
- In office January 1, 1863 – January 1, 1865
- Preceded by: George R. Stuntz
- Succeeded by: Amos S. Gray

Personal details
- Born: April 10, 1833 Wilton, New York, U.S.
- Died: January 22, 1882 (aged 48) St. Croix Falls, Wisconsin, U.S.
- Resting place: Prairie Home Cemetery, Waukesha, Wisconsin
- Party: Republican; National Union (1863-1865); Democratic (before 1863)
- Spouse: Ella Kellogg (died 1889)
- Profession: lawyer

Henry Danforth Barron (April 10, 1833 – January 22, 1882) was an American lawyer, politician, and judge. He was the 17th and 23rd speaker of the Wisconsin State Assembly, served six years as a Wisconsin circuit court judge, and was a member of the Wisconsin State Senate. He also held several local offices and was a member of the University of Wisconsin Board of Regents. He is the namesake of Barron County, Wisconsin.

== Biography ==
Born in Wilton, New York, he graduated from law school at Ballston Spa, New York, and moved to Wisconsin in 1851. After arriving in Wisconsin, he became a publisher of the Waukesha Democrat and its successor, the Chronotype. He was also appointed Postmaster of Waukesha by President Franklin Pierce. He relocated to Pepin County in 1857 and began a law practice. He was appointed Wisconsin circuit court judge by Governor Alexander Randall in 1860 and served until the election of a successor.

In 1862, he was elected to the Wisconsin State Assembly from the vast northwestern assembly district comprising the lightly populated counties of Ashland, Burnett, Dallas (now Barron), Douglas, La Pointe (now Bayfield), and Polk. He was re-elected in 1863, 1865, 1866, 1867, 1868, 1871, and 1872.

In 1869, he was offered appointment as chief justice for the Dakota Territory by President Ulysses S. Grant but turned it down. He was subsequently appointed fifth auditor of the United States Treasury, in April 1869, and served in that role until he returned to the Assembly in January 1872.

He was chosen as speaker for the 1866 and 1873 legislative sessions. In 1873, he was elected to the Wisconsin Senate, and was elected president pro tem of the Senate in 1875. He was re-elected to his senate seat in 1875, but was then elected to the Wisconsin circuit court again in the Spring of 1876, defeating incumbent judge Solon Clough. He remained on the court until his death in 1882.

In addition to his public offices, he was a Republican presidential elector in the 1868 and 1872 presidential elections and was chosen president of the electoral college for both elections. He was a Vice President of the Wisconsin Historical Society, and a member of the University of Wisconsin Board of Regents.

Barron lived in St. Croix County, Wisconsin. Barron County, Wisconsin, which he represented for many years as "Dallas County", was named after him by act of the legislature in 1869.

Wisconsin State Assembly
Preceded by Albert C. Stuntz	Member of the Wisconsin State Assembly from the Ashland–Barron–Bayfield–Burnett–Douglas–Polk district January 1, 1866 – January 1, 1870	Succeeded by Samuel B. Dresser
Preceded by Samuel S. Vaughn	Member of the Wisconsin State Assembly from the Ashland–Barron–Bayfield–Burnett–Douglas–Polk district January 1, 1872 – January 1, 1874	Succeeded by Sam S. Fifield
Preceded by George R. Stuntz	Member of the Wisconsin State Assembly from the Ashland–Burnett–Dallas–Douglas–La Pointe–Polk district January 1, 1863 – January 1, 1865	Succeeded by Amos S. Gray
Preceded by William W. Field	Speaker of the Wisconsin State Assembly; January 10, 1866 – January 9, 1867	Succeeded by Angus Cameron
Preceded by Daniel Hall	Speaker of the Wisconsin State Assembly; January 8, 1873 – January 14, 1874	Succeeded by Gabriel Bouck
Wisconsin Senate
Preceded by Joseph E. Irish	Member of the Wisconsin Senate from the 24th district January 1, 1874 – July 1876	Succeeded by Sam S. Fifield
Legal offices
Preceded by S. S. N. Fuller	Wisconsin Circuit Court Judge for the 8th circuit July 1860 – January 1, 1861	Succeeded by Alexander Randall
Preceded by Solon H. Clough	Wisconsin Circuit Court Judge for the 11th circuit July 1876 – January 22, 1882	Succeeded by Solon H. Clough
