= Martin McNamara (hurler) =

Irish hurler

Personal information
- Native name: Máirtín Mac Conmara (Irish)
- Born: 1864 Thurles, County Tipperary, Ireland
- Died: Unknown
- Occupation: General labourer

Sport
- Sport: Hurling
Club
- Years: Club
- 1880s-1900s: Thurles Blues
Club titles
- Tipperary titles: 1
Inter-county
- Years: County
- 1887: Tipperary
Inter-county titles
- All-Irelands: 1

Martin McNamara (born 1864) was an Irish hurler who played for the Tipperary senior team.

McNamara was a member of the team for just one season during the 1887 championship. It was a successful season as he secured an All-Ireland medal that year. It was Tipperary's first All-Ireland title.

At club level McNamara was a one-time county championship medalist with Thurles Blues.
