= Archibald D. Smith =

American politician

Archibald Dexter Smith (January 27, 1832 in Erie, Pennsylvania – September 30, 1904 in Waupaca, Wisconsin) was a member of the Wisconsin State Assembly during the 1872 session. Previously, he had been Chairman (similar to Mayor) of Lind, Wisconsin in 1857 and 1870 and Town Treasurer in 1860 and 1861. He was a Republican.
