= Steinfortsee =

Lake in Germany

- Location within Mecklenburg-Vorpommern
- Location: Mecklenburgische Seenplatte, Mecklenburg-Vorpommern
- Coordinates: 53°22′43″N 12°29′20″E
- Basin countries: Germany
- Surface area: 0.035 km^{2} (0.014 sq mi)
- Surface elevation: 73.5 m (241 ft)

Steinfortsee is a lake in the Mecklenburgische Seenplatte district in Mecklenburg-Vorpommern, Germany. At an elevation of 73.5 m, its surface area is 0.035 km^{2}.
