= Oliver A. Caswell =

American politician

Oliver A. Caswell (May 26, 1826 – May 1, 1885) was an American politician and member of the Wisconsin State Assembly.

== Biography ==
Oliver A. Caswell was born on May 26, 1826, in Norwich, Connecticut. He later settled in Mount Sterling, Wisconsin. Caswell died on May 1, 1885, at his home near Mount Sterling and was buried in McAuley-Halls-Branch Pioneer Cemetery.

== Political career ==
Caswell was elected to the Wisconsin State Assembly in 1872 as a member of the Democratic Party. He also served as deputy sheriff of Crawford County for 12 years and held the position of town chairman.

== See also ==
- The Political Graveyard
