= Orlando F. Wallihan =

American politician

Orlando F. Wallihan (December 31, 1833, in Trumbull County, Ohio – August 12, 1912), was a member of the Wisconsin State Assembly.

== Career ==
Wallihan was a member of the Assembly during the 1872 session. Other positions he held include justice of the peace. He was a Republican.
