= Martin McNamara (politician) =

Nineteenth-century American politician

Martin McNamara was a member of the Wisconsin State Assembly during the 1872 session. Other positions he held include Chairman (similar to Mayor) of Maple Grove, Manitowoc County, Wisconsin, in 1866. He was a Democrat. McNamara was born on November 7, 1811, in County Clare, Ireland.
