= Galen Seaman =

American politician

Galen Benjamin Seaman (August 8, 1837 – September 12, 1932) was an American lawyer and politician.

Born in Millport, Chemung County, New York, Seaman graduated from Dartmouth College in 1861. In 1862, Seaman moved to Milwaukee, Wisconsin, and was the principal of Mitchell Public School from 1862 to 1865, during which time he studied the law. From 1866 to 1872, Seaman was assistant assessor for the United States Internal Revenue Service. Seaman practiced law in Milwaukee. In 1873, Seaman served in the Wisconsin State Assembly and was a Republican. In 1886, Seaman served in the Milwaukee Light Horse Squadron during the Bay View Labor Riots of 1886. Seaman moved to Daytona Beach, Florida, in 1904 and served as mayor of Daytona Beach for one term. Seaman died at his home in Daytona Beach at age 95.
