= Joseph E. Irish =

American politician

Joseph E. Irish (August 7, 1833 – May 2, 1899) was an American politician and member of the Wisconsin State Senate.

Irish was born on August 7, 1833, in Paris, New York. He attended the Oneida Conference Seminary. In 1859, Irish became a preacher of the Methodist Episcopal Church. He was later chaplain to the 19th Infantry Regiment and the 8th Cavalry Regiment of the United States Army from 1892 to 1896. That year, Irish suffered a paralyzing stroke that he never fully recovered from. He died on May 2, 1899.

== Political career ==
Irish represented the 24th District from 1872 to 1873. He was the first clergyman to serve in the Senate. Other positions Irish held include County Surveyor of Richland County, Wisconsin, Register of the U.S. Land Office in Eau Claire, Wisconsin, and the U.S. Consul in Cognac, France. He was a Republican.
