= Wisconsin's Grant County 1st Assembly district =

Former American legislative district

Wisconsin's Grant County 1st State Assembly district
- Obsolete
- Notes: 1848–1954

Wisconsin's Grant County 1st Assembly district was a district in the Wisconsin State Assembly for several years in the early history of the state of Wisconsin, prior to the legislative redistricting reforms of 1972 which created the current numbered districts. Located in southwest Wisconsin, the district was one of the 66 original Assembly districts defined in Article XIV of the Constitution of Wisconsin. The Constitution originally allocated four districts for Grant County, Wisconsin; the 1st district originally comprised the southeast corner of Grant County.

The district was in use for the first 106 years of Wisconsin's history, from 1848 to 1954.

== List of representatives ==
List of representatives from the Grant County 1st district
Member	Party	Residence	Term start	Term end	Leg.
District created
James Gilmore	Whig	Jamestown	June 5, 1848	January 1, 1849	1st
Robert R. Young	Whig	Hazel Green	January 1, 1849	January 7, 1850	2nd
Henry D. York	Dem.	Hazel Green	January 7, 1850	January 6, 1851	3rd
James B. Johnson	Dem.	Fair Play	January 6, 1851	January 5, 1852	4th
William Richardson	Whig	Fair Play	January 5, 1852	January 3, 1853	5th
Henry D. York	Whig	Hazel Green	January 3, 1853	January 2, 1854	6th
Lewis Rood	Whig	Hazel Green	January 2, 1854	January 1, 1855	7th
Allen Taylor	Rep.	Hazel Green	January 1, 1855	January 4, 1858	8th 9th 10th
Henry D. York	Dem.	Hazel Green	January 4, 1858	January 3, 1859	11th
George Broderick	Dem.	Hazel Green	January 3, 1859	January 2, 1860	12th
James K. Spottswood	Rep.	Hazel Green	January 2, 1860	January 7, 1861	13th
Joseph Harris	Rep.	Hazel Green	January 7, 1861	January 6, 1862	14th
William Brandon	Rep.	Smeltzer's Grove	January 6, 1862	January 1, 1863	15th
John Harms	Dem.	Platteville	January 1, 1863	February 8, 1863	16th
John H. Rountree	Rep.	Platteville	February 8, 1863	January 4, 1864	16th
Hanmer Robbins	Union	Platteville	January 4, 1864	January 2, 1865	17th
William Brandon	Union	Smelser's Grove	January 2, 1865	January 1, 1866	18th
Hanmer Robbins	Union	Platteville	January 1, 1866	January 4, 1869	19th 20th 21st
Joseph Harris	Rep.	Fairview	January 4, 1869	January 3, 1870	22nd
Joel C. Squires	Dem.	Platteville	January 3, 1870	January 2, 1871	23rd
Joseph Harris	Rep.	Hazel Green	January 2, 1871	January 1, 1872	24th
George Cabanis	Rep.	Bigpatch	January 1, 1872	January 6, 1873	25th
Thomas G. Stephens	Lib.R.	Hazel Green	January 6, 1873	January 5, 1874	26th
Thomas Jenkins	Dem.	Platteville	January 5, 1874	January 4, 1875	27th
James Jeffrey	Rep.	Georgetown	January 4, 1875	January 3, 1876	28th
William D. Jones	Rep.	Hazel Green	January 3, 1876	January 1, 1877	29th
William E. Carter	Rep.	Platteville	January 1, 1877	January 5, 1880	30th 31st 32nd
Charles Watson	Rep.	Lima	January 5, 1880	January 3, 1881	33rd
James Cabanis	Rep.	Smelser	January 3, 1881	January 1, 1883	34th 35th
Ensign Dickinson	Rep.	Platteville	January 1, 1883	January 5, 1885	36th
James V. Hollman	Rep.	Platteville	January 5, 1885	January 3, 1887	37th
James B. McCoy	Rep.	Platteville	January 3, 1887	January 5, 1891	38th 39th
John Longbotham	Rep.	Paris	January 5, 1891	January 7, 1895	40th 41st
Adelbert L. Utt	Rep.	Platteville	January 7, 1895	January 4, 1897	42nd
Thomas McDonald Jr.	Rep.	Lancaster	January 4, 1897	January 7, 1901	43rd 44th
Delford Brunson	Rep.	Fennimore	January 7, 1901	January 5, 1903	45th
Sherman E. Smalley	Rep.	Cuba City	January 5, 1903	January 2, 1905	46th
Duncan McGregor	Rep.	Platteville	January 2, 1905	January 4, 1909	47th 48th
Allen Wells	Rep.	Livingston	January 4, 1909	January 6, 1913	49th 50th
James Dolan	Dem.	Platteville	January 6, 1913	January 4, 1915	51st
Allen Wells	Rep.	Livingston	January 4, 1915	January 1, 1917	52nd
Benjamin Webster	Rep.	Platteville	January 1, 1917	January 6, 1919	53rd
John L. Grindell	Rep.	Platteville	January 6, 1919	January 3, 1921	54th
Conrad J. Weittenhiller	Rep.	Platteville	January 3, 1921	January 1, 1923	55th
George Slack	Rep.	Platteville	January 1, 1923	January 3, 1927	56th 57th
Harry E. Stephens	Rep.	Platteville	January 3, 1927	January 2, 1933	58th 59th 60th
Bert A. Clemens	Rep.	Cuba City	January 2, 1933	January 7, 1935	61st
William H. Goldthorpe	Rep.	Cuba City	January 7, 1935	January 6, 1947	62nd 63rd 64th 65th 66th 67th
Robert S. Travis	Rep.	Platteville	January 6, 1947	January 3, 1955	68th 69th 70th 71st
District abolished by 1951 Wisconsin Act 728 (implemented 1954); Grant County was consolidated as a single-county Assembly district
