= National Register of Historic Places listings in Grant County, Wisconsin =

Location of Grant County in Wisconsin

This is a list of the National Register of Historic Places listings in Grant County, Wisconsin. It is intended to provide a comprehensive listing of entries in the National Register of Historic Places that are located in Grant County, Wisconsin. The locations of National Register properties for which the latitude and longitude coordinates are included below may be seen in a map.

There are 40 properties and districts listed on the National Register in the county, and one former listing.

This National Park Service list is complete through NPS recent listings posted November 6, 2026.

== Current listings ==
	Name on the Register	Image	Date listed	Location	City or town	Description
1	Agriculture and Manual Arts Building/Platteville State Normal School	Agriculture and Manual Arts Building/Platteville State Normal School	March 14, 1985 (#85000578)	Univ. of WI, Platteville; 42°44′03″N 90°29′10″W	Platteville	Designed by Van Ryn & DeGelleke in Neoclassical style and built in 1916, this hall contained a forge room, a farm carpentry room, a dairy lab, a stock judging room, a gym, etc. The specialized training it allowed was a milestone in the state normal school system. Now known as Ullrich Hall, oldest remaining academic building at UW-Platteville.
2	L. J. Arthur House	L. J. Arthur House	September 5, 1985 (#85001951)	210 N. Jefferson St. 42°50′57″N 90°42′39″W	Lancaster	2-story red brick Victorian home built in 1880 for Arthur, an attorney. Bought in 1889 by local merchant Charles Basford.
3	James Ballantine House	James Ballantine House	June 7, 1976 (#76000062)	720 North 4th Street; 42°53′16″N 90°55′34″W	Bloomington	1877 brick Italianate house with two 2-story bay windows. After losing a leg, James lent money and raised plants and livestock. His house is little changed, since it stood vacant from the death of his wife Abbie in 1937 until 1975.
4	Bass Site (47Gt25)		September 9, 1982 (#82000669)	Address Restricted	Lancaster	Site on a ridge where Early Archaic people quarried chert and formed it into projectiles.
5	Bayley Avenue Historic District	Bayley Avenue Historic District	July 19, 2007 (#07000708)	100-400 Bayley Av., 400 Blk. S Court St., 150, 210, 270 Rountree Av. & 65 Mitchell Av. 42°43′52″N 90°28′46″W	Platteville	J.H. Rountree, founder of Platteville, built his Greek Revival home in this district in 1853 and it was the only house there until 1890, when he died. Then his heirs subdivided the parcel and it quickly filled in with turn-of-the-century homes, including the 1890 Queen Anne Jenning house, the 1908 American Foursquare Webster house, the 1915 Craftsman W.N. Smith house, and the 1940 Georgian Revival L.A. Wills house.
6	Beebe House	Beebe House	August 7, 1979 (#79000078)	390 W. Adams St. 42°44′19″N 90°28′49″W	Platteville	2-story Victorian Gothic home built in 1870, clad with local brick. Captain William Beebe was a New York native, a Civil War vet, a lawyer, mayor of Platteville, and an inventor. By 1877 he had an electrical telephone communicating between Platteville and Lancaster, only a year after Alexander Graham Bell's first long-distance line.
7	Bode-Wad-Mi Rockshelter	Bode-Wad-Mi Rockshelter	June 23, 1995 (#95000760)	Address Restricted	Castle Rock	
8	Boscobel Grand Army of the Republic Hall	Boscobel Grand Army of the Republic Hall	December 27, 2007 (#07001329)	102 Mary Street; 43°07′55″N 90°42′23″W	Boscobel	Originally a Baptist church built in 1879, the building was bought by the GAR in 1896 and remodeled as a meeting hall. Still in use as a meeting hall and museum.
9	Boscobel High School	Boscobel High School	December 30, 1986 (#86003518)	207 Buchanan Street; 43°07′59″N 90°42′11″W	Boscobel	3-story Romanesque Revival building clad in local limestone, with a 4-story tower, designed by Van Ryn & DeGelleke and built in 1898. Now called Rock School.
10	Central House Hotel	Central House Hotel	November 27, 1996 (#96001361)	1005 Wisconsin Avenue; 43°08′04″N 90°42′20″W	Boscobel	3-story Italianate-styled hotel built of limestone from 1865 to 1873. The Gideons (which places Bibles in hotel rooms) was conceived here in 1898 when two businessmen shared room 19.
11	Leonard and Caroline Coates House	Leonard and Caroline Coates House	October 4, 2021 (#100007031)	250 Southwest Rd. 42°41′48″N 90°30′14″W	Platteville	Brick Italianate-style house built in 1868 by Coates, a miner from Yorkshire who moved into the lead smelting business and served Platteville as mayor and by helping bring the railroad.
12	Courthouse Square Historical District	Courthouse Square Historical District	April 7, 2006 (#06000233)	Cherry, Jefferson, Madison, and Maple Sts. 42°50′51″N 90°42′36″W	Lancaster	Intact historic downtown centered around the courthouse, including the 1868 Commercial Vernacular-styled Wright House Hotel, the 1888 Italianate Showalter Building, the 1894 Romanesque Revival Reed Opera House, the 1901 Richardsonian Romanesque I.O.O.F. Hall (pictured), the 1903 Neoclassical First National Bank of Lancaster, and the 1904 Queen Anne Louis Alt Building.
13	Edward and Mary Davies House	Edward and Mary Davies House	June 6, 2023 (#100009038)	315 North 2nd St. 42°44′11″N 90°28′34″W	Platteville	Modest 2-story brick house with the massing and simple window trim of Greek Revival style, built in 1864 for Welsh immigrant blacksmith Edward Davies, and little changed since then.
14	Division Street Historic District	Division Street Historic District	July 19, 2007 (#07000709)	200-300 Blk. Division St., 145, 170, 175, 190, 195, 220 S Chestnut St. 42°43′57″N 90°28′54″W	Platteville	Small residential historic district, including the 1895 Gabled Ell Nicklas house, 1906 Queen Anne Robinson house, the 1908 Queen Anne/American Foursquare Barden house, and the 1905 American Foursquare Grindell house.
15	Eagle Valley Mound District	Eagle Valley Mound District	July 11, 2001 (#01000736)	Address Restricted	Glen Haven	
16	Jonathan H. Evans House	Jonathan H. Evans House	June 1, 1982 (#82000670)	440 W. Adams St. 42°44′20″N 90°28′53″W	Platteville	1870 home which mixes elements of Italianate design with Queen Anne. Evans was a school teacher, storekeeper, civic leader, bank organizer, and an early shaper of Wisconsin's normal school system.
17	First Congregational Church	First Congregational Church	June 19, 1985 (#85001359)	80 Market; 42°44′09″N 90°28′42″W	Platteville	Red-brick Romanesque Revival church built in 1869 and expanded in 1895 by Platteville's Congregationals.
18	German Evangelical Lutheran Church of Peace	German Evangelical Lutheran Church of Peace	April 25, 2022 (#100007631)	350 East Furnace St. 42°44′04″N 90°28′21″W	Platteville	Gothic Revival-style red brick church built in 1856 by German Lutherans. Now the oldest surviving church building in Platteville.
19	Grant County Courthouse	Grant County Courthouse	October 19, 1978 (#78000096)	126 W. Main St. 42°50′51″N 90°42′36″W	Lancaster	3-story courthouse with glass and copper dome, designed by Armand D. Koch of Milwaukee in Neoclassical style and built in 1902.
20	Hazel Green Town Hall	Hazel Green Town Hall	January 26, 1989 (#88003231)	2130 N. Main St. 42°32′00″N 90°26′05″W	Hazel Green	1891 Boomtown-front frame building which originally housed the Town Clerk's office and a civic auditorium which hosted dances, church functions, vaudeville acts, patent medicine peddlers, commencements, movies, and a jail.
21	Hog Hollow Site	Hog Hollow Site	May 10, 1996 (#96000496)	Address Restricted	Potosi	
22	Patrick and Margaret Kinney House	Patrick and Margaret Kinney House	March 6, 2008 (#08000160)	424 N. Fillmore St. 42°51′06″N 90°43′10″W	Lancaster	Limestone clad home built for Patrick Kinney, a successful Lancaster attorney, his wife, Margaret, and their growing family, in 1951-1953 from a design supplied by Frank Lloyd Wright.
23	Paul Kuehl House	Paul Kuehl House	March 19, 2026 (#100012825)	1050 North Second Street; 42°44′39″N 90°28′22″W	Platteville	Tudor Revival-style home designed by architect Paul Kuehl for himself, built in 1937. The rough sandstone exterior and the shakes in the gable peaks show the influence of the National Parks' Rustic Style architecture. This is the only Tudor Revival home in Platteville.
24	Lancaster Municipal Building	Lancaster Municipal Building	March 10, 1983 (#83003397)	206 S. Madison St. 42°50′51″N 90°42′33″W	Lancaster	Brick Prairie School civic building trimmed in terra cotta, designed by Claude & Starck and build in 1923. Originally housed city offices, fire department, and 800-seat theater.
25	Lancaster Post Office	Lancaster Post Office	October 24, 2000 (#00001245)	236 W. Maple St. 42°50′52″N 90°42′43″W	Lancaster	Simplified Art Moderne post office built in 1938, containing a mural "Farm Yard" painted by Tom Rost in 1940 and supported by the New Deal Public Works of Art Project.
26	Main Street Commercial Historic District	Main Street Commercial Historic District	March 9, 1990 (#90000377)	Roughly bounded by Chestnut, Furnace, Bonson, Mineral, Oak, and Pine; 42°44′04″N 90°28′42″W	Platteville	Includes the area of Platteville's early business districts on Second Street and Main, platted like an English village with narrow streets, narrow lots, and a village green. Includes the 1847 Federal-styled Parnell Building (pictured), the 1853 Hendershot Harness Shop, the 1876 Italianate Kettler building, the 1906 Italianate Wedige Saloon, the 1906 Queen Anne Dr. Cunningham house, the 1914 Tudor Revival Carnegie Library, the 1924 Neoclassical First National Bank, and the 1938 Art Deco Municipal Building.
27	Mitchell-Rountree House	Mitchell-Rountree House	February 23, 1972 (#72000052)	Jewett and Lancaster Sts. 42°44′29″N 90°28′57″W	Platteville	Early 1.5-story cottage built of carefully fit dolomite for Rev. Samuel Mitchell in a style from his native Virginia. Mitchell had served in the Revolutionary War. John Rountree, founder of Platteville, married Mitchell's daughter, probably built the house, and Rountrees lived there for many years.
28	Dwight T. Parker Public Library	Dwight T. Parker Public Library	March 10, 1983 (#83003398)	925 Lincoln Ave. 42°59′00″N 90°39′18″W	Fennimore	1923 library building donated by local banker Parker and designed by Claude & Starck with Prairie Style massing, but a NeoClassical entrance and a Mediterranean Revival roof.
29	Platteville Army National Guard Armory	Platteville Army National Guard Armory	April 10, 2026 (#100012899)	475 North Water Street; 42°44′15″N 90°28′20″W	Platteville	National Guard armory designed by Henry C. Hengels in Art Deco style and built from 1940 to 1942 with supporting funds from the Works Progress Administration. Still serves as a community center.
30	Potosi Badger Huts Site	Potosi Badger Huts Site	December 27, 1996 (#96001532)	.5 mi. SW of jct. of WI 133 and WI U 42°41′10″N 90°42′45″W	Potosi	Lead-mining site on a ridge from at least 1833, consisting of the remains of two structures, over 100 test pits, and a possible adit. Possibly the only site of its kind remaining from the era.
31	Potosi Brewery	Potosi Brewery	November 19, 1980 (#80000138)	Main St. 42°40′37″N 90°43′32″W	Potosi	Limestone brewing plant begun by Gabriel Hail in 1852, and expanded over the years by the Schumachers. Once the 5th largest brewery in Wisconsin. Now a museum.
32	Rock School and Hanmer Robbins School Complex	Rock School and Hanmer Robbins School Complex	June 28, 2023 (#100009102)	405 East Main St. 42°43′58″N 90°28′22″W	Platteville	The Rock School was built 1858-63, a 2-story structure with walls of coursed limestone and roof and window treatments in Greek Revival style. The Hanmer Robbins School is a 2-story Richardsonian Romanesque high school built around 1905. Both are now part of a museum complex.
33	Rountree Hall	Rountree Hall	December 17, 1974 (#74000091)	30 North Elm St. 42°44′07″N 90°28′53″W	Platteville	Greek Revival-styled hall begun in 1853 to house the Platteville Academy, one of Wisconsin's earliest educational institutions. Also housed the state's first normal school in 1866. Wings and cupola were added in subsequent years. Now part of UW-Platteville.
34	J. H. Rountree Mansion	J. H. Rountree Mansion	June 13, 1986 (#86001307)	150 Rountree Ave. 42°43′56″N 90°28′41″W	Platteville	2-story brick mansion built in Greek Revival style in 1854, with a 2-story porch that gives it a southern flavor. Rountree was born in Kentucky, came to Wisconsin in 1827 prospecting for lead, opened the first store and lead-smelting furnace in 1828, served in the Black Hawk War, platted Platteville, and did much to develop the area. Now owned by UW-Platteville.
35	St. John Mine	St. John Mine	June 4, 1979 (#79000079)	WI 133; 42°41′10″N 90°42′56″W	Potosi	Natural cave where Native Americans and the French dug galena as early as 1700. Around 1828 Willis St. John began mining the veins that ran back into the hillside. He was broke by 1848 and sold the mine to Nelson Dewey and Henry Massey, who closed it, exhausted, in 1870.
36	Stonefield	Stonefield	May 19, 1970 (#70000034)	2.5 mi. W of Cassville, on CR VV; 42°44′03″N 91°01′18″W	Cassville	Farm/estate on a hillside above the Mississippi, started by Nelson Dewey in the 1860s after he was Wisconsin's first governor, with original Gothic Revival outbuildings. Now a museum, with agricultural museum and recreated farming village.
37	Trinity Episcopal Church	Trinity Episcopal Church	June 20, 2023 (#100009063)	250 Market St. 42°44′09″N 90°28′48″W	Platteville	Very-intact brick church designed by Garry Nettleton in Gothic Revival style and built in 1864, with a square tower, buttresses, and rose window. Has served its Episcopal congregation continuously ever since.
38	West Main Street Historic District	West Main Street Historic District	July 19, 2007 (#07000710)	Roughly bounded by N & S Elm, W Pine, N & S Hickory & W Mineral Sts. 42°44′06″N 90°28′55″W	Platteville	Old residential district, including the 1847 Greek Revival Lewis house, the Second Empire Pickard house, the 1859 Italianate Hodges house, the 1909 Queen Anne Burg Sr. house, the 1915 Arts and Crafts Kelley house, and the 1922 Dutch Colonial Revival Burg Jr house.
39	Wyalusing State Park Mounds Archeological District	Wyalusing State Park Mounds Archeological District	September 21, 1999 (#99001175)	13342 Cty. Hwy. C 42°58′52″N 91°06′42″W	Bagley	Conical, linear and effigy mounds, many arranged in lines, on bluffs above the Wisconsin and Mississippi Rivers, built by Middle and Late Woodland people.
40	John Young House	John Young House	September 26, 1994 (#94001157)	323 S. Wisconsin Ave. 43°10′57″N 90°26′35″W	Muscoda	2.5 story Queen Anne-styled house built in 1900 by John and Charles Wade for Young, a German immigrant, Civil War veteran, and Muscoda lumber dealer.

== Former listings ==
	Name on the Register	Image	Date listed	Date removed	Location	City or town	Description
1	Denniston House	Denniston House	February 20, 1975 (#75000213)	January 22, 2026	117 E. Front St; 42°42′45″N 90°59′25″W	Cassville	Brick hotel built in 1836 in hopes that Cassville would become the capital of Wisconsin Territory. Wisconsin's first governor Nelson Dewey lived here and died in 1889, after his financial ruin.

== See also ==
- List of National Historic Landmarks in Wisconsin
- National Register of Historic Places listings in Wisconsin
- Listings in neighboring counties: Clayton (IA), Crawford, Dubuque (IA), Iowa, Jo Daviess (IL), Lafayette, Richland
