= James Cabanis =

American politician

James Henry Cabanis (December 25, 1838 – 1920) was an American merchant from Georgetown, Grant County, Wisconsin who spent two years as a Republican member of the Wisconsin State Assembly from Grant County. His father George Cabanis had been elected from substantially the same district in 1871.

== Background ==
Cabanis was born in Springfield, Illinois on December 25, 1838. His family moved from Illinois to Wisconsin, in 1845, and settled in Grant County, where he received what was termed "an academic education". He became a merchant by occupation.

== Elective office ==
Cabanis was elected town clerk of the Town of Smelser (of which Georgetown is a part) in 1862, 1871 (the year in which his father George was elected to his only term in the Assembly), 1872, and 1878. James Cabanis was elected to the Assembly for 1881 to succeed fellow Republican Charles Watson, who was not a candidate for re-election, for the 1st Grant County Assembly district, substantially the same as that from which his father had been elected. He received 1,695 votes against 1,063 votes for former Democratic State Representative Thomas Jenkins. He was assigned to the standing committee on federal relations.

In 1882, he was re-elected, winning 940 votes to 493 for independent H. Robbins and 14 for Greenbacker E. Wetherbee. He moved to the committees on ways and means and on enrolled bills.

He was not a candidate for re-election in 1883, and was succeeded by fellow Republican Ensign Dickinson.

He also served on the Grant County Board of Supervisors and was Mayor of Platteville, Wisconsin.
