= Thomas G. Stephens =

American politician

Member of the Wisconsin State Assembly from Grant County's 1st district

Personal details
- Born: April 6, 1818 Cornwall, England
- Party: Liberal Reform Party
- Occupation: Lead smelter

Thomas G. Stephens (April 6, 1818 –?) was an American lead smelter from Hazel Green, Wisconsin who served one term as a member of the Wisconsin State Assembly from Grant County as part of the "Liberal Reform" or "People's Reform" Party in 1873.

== Background ==
Stephens was born in Cornwall England on April 6, 1818. He received a public school education, and went into the smelting trade. He came to Wisconsin in 1841 and settled in Hazel Green.

== Elective office ==
In 1866, and again from 1896 to 1872, he served as Town Chairman for the Town of Hazel Green.

In 1873 he was elected to the first Grant County Assembly district (the Towns of Harrison, Hazel Green, Jamestown, Paris, Platteville and Smelser) as part of the "Reform", "Liberal Reform" or "People's Reform" Party, a short-lived coalition of Democrats, reform and Liberal Republicans, and Grangers which secured the election of Stephens and a number of others, as well as of William Robert Taylor as Governor in 1873. He won 951 votes, to 775 for Hanmer Robbins, the Republican nominee (Republican incumbent George Cabanis was not a candidate). He was assigned to the standing committee on incorporations.

He was not a candidate for re-election the next year, and was succeeded by Democrat Thomas Jenkins.
