= George Cabanis =

19th century American politician

Member of the Wisconsin State Assembly from the Grant 1st district
- In office January 1, 1872 – January 6, 1873
- Preceded by: Joseph Harris
- Succeeded by: Thomas G. Stephens

Personal details
- Born: September 7, 1815 Greensburg, Kentucky, U.S.
- Died: February 7, 1892 (aged 76) Grant County, Wisconsin, U.S.
- Party: Republican
- Spouse: Mary Ann Lauterman (m. 1836–1892)
- Children: Jasper Cabanis^{(b. 1836; died 1862)}; James Henry Cabanis^{(b. 1838; died 1920)}

Military service
- Allegiance: United States
- Branch/service: Illinois militia
- Years of service: 1832
- Battles/wars: Black Hawk War

George Edwin Cabanis (September 7, 1815 – February 7, 1892) was an American carpenter and builder from Bigpatch, Wisconsin, who served one term as a Republican member of the Wisconsin State Assembly representing Grant County's First Assembly district (the Towns of Harrison, Hazel Green, Jamestown, Paris, Platteville and Smelser).

== Background ==
Cabanis was born in Greensburg, in Green County, Kentucky in 1815. When he was seven years old, his family moved to Sangamon County, Illinois, where they were some of the first white settlers.

During the Black Hawk War in 1832, he volunteered with the brigade of Samuel Whiteside in the Illinois militia.

In 1834 he moved to New Diggings, Wisconsin, to prospect for lead. In 1844 he moved to the Town of Smelser in Grant County, where he settled. He served as town clerk, school superintendent, and town chairman at various times.

== Legislature ==
In 1871, he was elected to the Assembly to succeed fellow Republican Joseph Harris, defeating former State Representative and State Senator Democrat John Rountree by a vote of 670 to 615. He was assigned to the standing committee on mining and smelting. He did not run for re-election in 1872, and was succeeded by Liberal Reform Party candidate Thomas G. Stephens.

== Personal life ==
He married Mary Ann Lauterman, a native of Illinois. They had two sons:

- Jasper N. Cabanis served in the 25th Wisconsin Infantry Regiment during the Civil War and died of disease in 1862.
- James Henry Cabanis was elected to his father's former seat in the Wisconsin Assembly, in 1881.

Cabanis died in Bigpatch or Georgetown, Wisconsin, on February 7, 1892.

It is unclear whether the "G. E. Cabanis" and "Geo. E. Cabanis" who is reported as principal of various area public high schools (Potosi, Mineral Point and Darlington) from 1887 to 1891 is the same man.
