= John H. Rountree =

American farmer, businessman, and politician (1805–1890)

Member of the Wisconsin Senate from the 16th district
- In office January 1, 1866 – January 6, 1868
- Preceded by: Milas K. Young
- Succeeded by: George Cochrane Hazelton

Member of the Wisconsin State Assembly from the Grant 1st district
- In office February 8, 1863 – January 4, 1864
- Preceded by: John Harms (challenged); William Brandon (previous term)
- Succeeded by: Hanmer Robbins

Member of the Wisconsin Senate from the 6th district
- In office January 7, 1850 – January 5, 1852
- Preceded by: George W. Lakin
- Succeeded by: Joel C. Squires

Member of the Council of the Wisconsin Territory from Grant County
- In office November 26, 1838 – January 4, 1847 Serving with James R. Vineyard (1838–1842) and Nelson Dewey (1842–1847)
- Preceded by: Position established
- Succeeded by: Orris McCartney

Personal details
- Born: March 24, 1805 Warren County, Kentucky, U.S.
- Died: June 27, 1890 (aged 85) Platteville, Wisconsin, U.S.
- Resting place: Hillside Cemetery, Platteville, Wisconsin
- Party: Republican; Natl. Union (1862–1867); Whig (before 1854)
- Spouses: Mary Grace Mitchell (m. 1828; died 1837); Lydia H. Southworth (m. 1839; died 1881)
- Children: with Mary Grace Mitchell; Hiram Samuel Rountree^{(b. 1831; died 1881)}; Ellen (Jewett)^{(b. 1834; died 1919)}; John M. Rountree^{(b. 1836; died 1886)}; Mary Grace Rountree^{(b. 1837; died 1838)}; with Lydia H. Southworth; George Hancock Rountree^{(b. 1840; died 1893)}; Mary Grace Rountree^{(b. 1845; died 1845)}; Mary Jane Rountree^{(b. 1846; died 1846)}; Philip Southworth Rountree^{(b. 1849; died 1916)}; Charles J. Rountree^{(b. 1858; died 1884)}

Military service
- Allegiance: United States
- Branch/service: Michigan Territory Militia
- Years of service: 1832
- Rank: Major
- Battles/wars: Black Hawk War

John Hawkins Rountree (March 24, 1805 – June 27, 1890) was an American farmer, businessman, politician, and Wisconsin pioneer. He was the founder of Platteville, Wisconsin, and was instrumental in the early development of that village. He was also one of the founders of the Northwestern Mutual Insurance Company, and remained a director in the company until his death. In politics, he represented Grant County for five years in the Wisconsin Legislature, and was a delegate to Wisconsin's 2nd constitutional convention in 1847.

== Founding Platteville ==
Born in Warren County, Kentucky, Rountree moved north in 1824 to Hillsboro, Illinois, where he served as deputy sheriff. In 1827, he continued north into the Michigan Territory to seek economic opportunity in the lead mining region in the area that is now southern Wisconsin. He staked a claim near the Platte River—where the city of Platteville, Wisconsin, now stands—and discovered rich deposits of lead in the area. He constructed a sod house for himself and, the next year, opened the first lead smelting furnace in the town, the first store, and a log boarding house for newcomers. In 1829 he was appointed the first postmaster for the village and helped organize Platteville's Methodist Episcopal congregation, and in 1836 he established the first sawmill and built the first hotel. In 1841, he platted the original village of Platteville. He also helped establish a creamery and a newspaper there, and had a hand in bringing the Chicago & Northwestern Railway to town in the 1870s.

Rountree owned large parcels of land around the village of Platteville and every five or ten years would plat another addition to the village, selling the lots for businesses and homes. Rountree at this time also owned slaves, something that was not legal in the area at the time. His slaves were named Rachel, Maria and Felix. All three were granted their freedom in 1841 by the US Government, although Rachel stayed with Rountree until her death in 1854. In 1853 he built his own fine home on a large parcel south of the downtown. The building still stands, and is now listed as the J. H. Rountree Mansion in the National Register of Historic Places. He had previously built a house for his father-in-law, Samuel Mitchell, now known as the Mitchell-Rountree House, that is also listed on the National Register of Historic Places. Despite its proximity to the downtown, his house remained the only house on that parcel until after Rountree died in 1890, when his heirs subdivided the parcel and the lots quickly filled. The fine homes of the Bayley Avenue Historic District now occupy part of Rountree's home parcel.

== Early service ==
Rountree served as judge in the Michigan Territory and later the Wisconsin Territory. He was a captain of the militia during the Black Hawk War of 1832, and was involved with Col. Henry Dodge's negotiations attempting to keep the Winnebago from allying with the Sauk.

He served on the Council (equivalent to a Senate) from the newly created Grant County in the Second through Fourth Wisconsin Territorial Legislatures (1838–1846) and as a delegate to the 1847-1848 Wisconsin State Constitutional Convention from Grant County (where he is recorded as insisting that a strong uniformity clause was "a matter of very great importance".

== State legislature ==
In 1850 and 1851, Rountree served as a Whig member of the Wisconsin State Senate from the original 6th Senate district, succeeding fellow Whig George W. Lakin; in 1852, he was replaced by Democrat Joel Squires.

In 1863, he was elected as a Republican member of the Wisconsin State Assembly from the 1st Grant County district (Towns of Hazle Green, Smeltzer and Plattville) to succeed William Brandon, after a contested election result initially awarded the seat to Democrat John Harms; at that time, he characterized his profession as "farmer." He was succeeded in 1864 by Hanmer Robbins of the Republican/National Union party.

In 1866 and 1867, Rountree served in the Wisconsin State Senate again, elected on the National Union ticket to represent the 16th Senate district (Grant County), succeeding Milas K. Young (another Whig-turned-Republican elected on the National Union ticket); he still described his profession as "farmer". He was assigned to the standing committees on finance, agriculture, and benevolent institutions. He was succeeded in 1868 by Republican George Hazelton.

== Personal life and family ==
Rountree was married twice, and had fifteen children. His first wife was Mary Grace Mitchell, the daughter of Reverend Samuel Mitchell, another of the pioneer settlers at Platteville. They married August 7, 1828, at Galena, Illinois, and had five children before her death in 1837. He subsequently married Lydia H. Southworth of Clinton, New York, the niece of New York politician Sylvester Gridley. Rountree and his second wife had ten children.

Though the Northwest Ordinance forbade slavery in the Northwest Territory—including Wisconsin—Rountree bought a woman named Rachael in 1827, in Galena, Illinois, to have her work as a servant to his new wife. "Aunt" Rachael was freed in the 1840s, but stayed with the family until her death. She was buried in the Rountree family plot, under the smallest stone, marked only with an initial "R."

Wisconsin State Assembly
| Preceded by John Harms (challenged); William Brandon (previous term) | Member of the Wisconsin State Assembly from the Grant 1st district February 8, 1863 – January 4, 1864 | Succeeded by Hanmer Robbins |
Wisconsin Senate
| Preceded by George W. Lakin | Member of the Wisconsin Senate from the 6th district January 7, 1850 – January 5, 1852 | Succeeded by Joel C. Squires |
| Preceded by Milas K. Young | Member of the Wisconsin Senate from the 16th district January 1, 1866 – January 6, 1868 | Succeeded by George Cochrane Hazelton |
