= Division Street Historic District =

Division Street Historic District may refer to:

- Division Street Historic District (Bridgeport, Connecticut), listed on the National Register of Historic Places in Fairfield County, Connecticut
- Division Street Historic District (Platteville, Wisconsin), listed on the National Register of Historic Places in Grant County, Wisconsin
