= Platteville Municipal Airport =

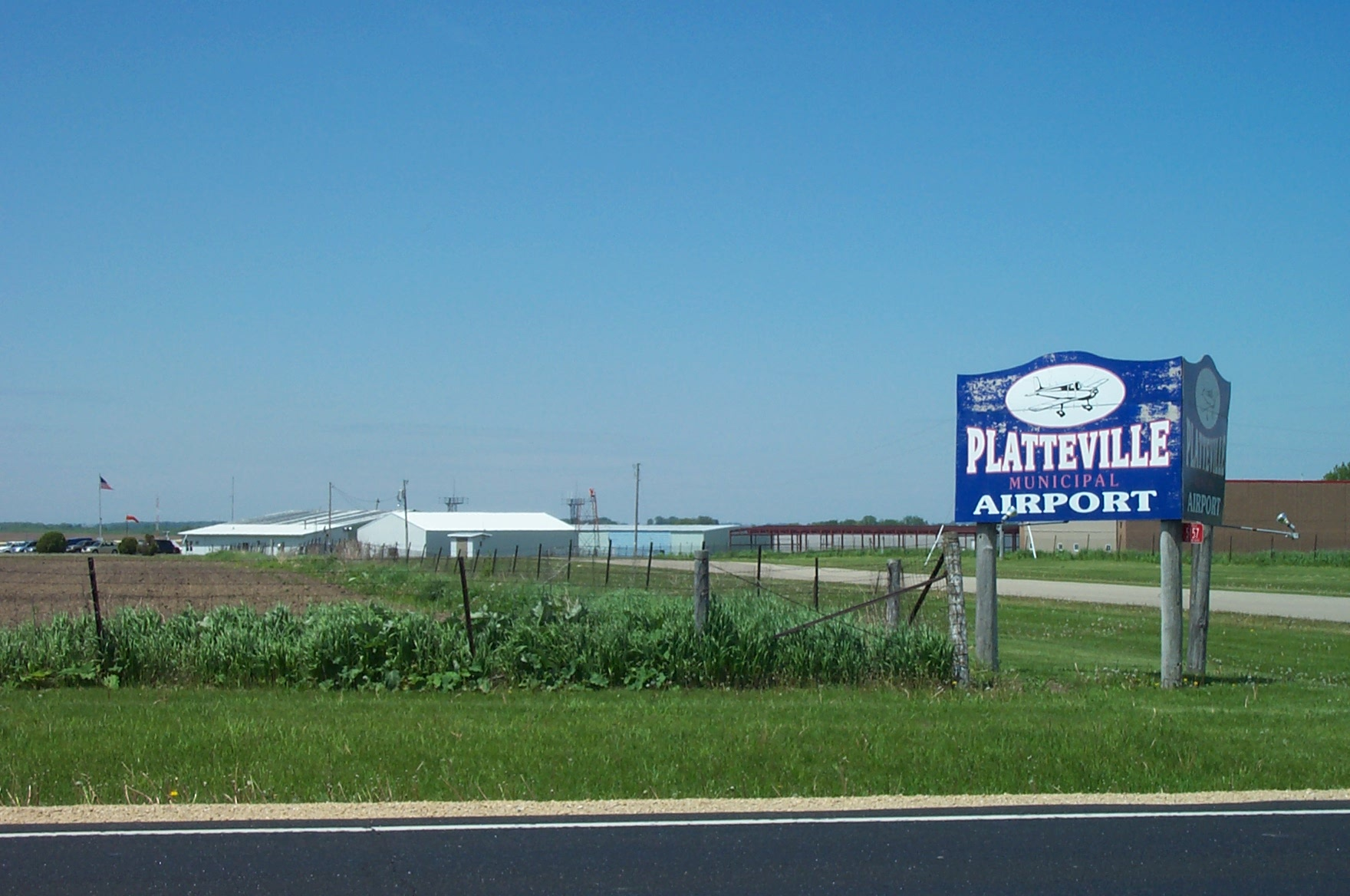
- IATA: none; ICAO: KPVB; FAA LID: PVB

Summary
- Airport type: Public
- Owner: City of Platteville
- Serves: Platteville, Wisconsin
- Opened: October 1965
- Time zone: CST (UTC−06:00)
  - Summer (DST): CDT (UTC−05:00)
- Elevation AMSL: 1,025 ft / 312 m
- Coordinates: 42°41′22″N 090°26′40″W

Map
- Location of airport in Wisconsin PVB (the United States)

Runways
Direction	Length		Surface
Direction	ft	m	Surface
15/33	4,000	1,219	Asphalt
7/25	3,600	1,097	Asphalt

Statistics
- Aircraft operations (2024): 20,550
- Based aircraft (2024): 19
- Source: Federal Aviation Administration

Platteville Municipal Airport (ICAO: KPVB, FAA LID: PVB) is a city owned public use airport located three nautical miles (6 km) southeast of the central business district of Platteville, a city in Grant County, Wisconsin, United States. It is included in the Federal Aviation Administration (FAA) National Plan of Integrated Airport Systems for 2025–2029, in which it is categorized as a local general aviation facility.

Although most U.S. airports use the same three-letter location identifier for the FAA and IATA, this airport is assigned PVB by the FAA but has no designation from the IATA.

== Facilities and aircraft ==
Platteville Municipal Airport covers an area of 533 acres (216 ha) at an elevation of 1,025 feet (312 m) above mean sea level. It has two asphalt paved runways: 15/33 is 4,000 by 75 feet (1,219 x 23 m); 7/25 is 3,600 by 75 feet (1,097 x 23 m).

A non-directional beacon was located at the facility, 203 kHz, ident PVB. It was decommissioned in 2011.

The fixed-base operator is Apex Aero Center.

For the 12-month period ending May 22, 2024, the airport had 20,550 aircraft operations, an average of 56 per day: 97% general aviation, 3% air taxi and less than 1% military.

In July 2024, there were 19 aircraft based at this airport: 17 single-engine and 2 multi-engine.

== See also ==
- List of airports in Wisconsin
- Platteville Public Transportation
