= Platte River (Wisconsin) =

Location
- Country: United States
- State: Wisconsin

Physical characteristics
- Source
  - coordinates: 42.9655°N 90.4235°W
- Mouth
  - coordinates: 42.612°N 90.665°W
- Length: 47.25 mi (76.04 km)
- Basin size: 197.74 mi^{2} (512.1 km^{2})

Basin features
- River system: Mississippi River

The Platte River is a tributary of the Mississippi River in southwestern Wisconsin in the United States. Its watershed lies almost entirely within Grant County, with only a small portion in neighboring Iowa County, and its main tributary is the Little Platte River. It is about 47 mi (76 km) long.

The name Platte is derived from the French meaning "flat" or "shallow".

== Course ==
The Platte River rises near Montfort and follows a generally southwesterly course through Grant County. It flows into the Mississippi River about 3 mi (5 km) southwest of Dickeyville, across from Mud Lake, Iowa. It is navigable from Ellenboro downstream to its confluence with the Mississippi. At one time, steamboats could navigate the lowest reaches of the river.

The Platte's largest tributary is the Little Platte River, which rises near Livingston. It joins the Platte River 42 miles (68 km) to the southwest about 2 miles (3 km) west of Paris.

== Geography ==
The Platte and Little Platte Rivers lie in exceptionally hilly terrain known as the Driftless Area. Many steep limestone bluffs dominate the landscape, often covered by white pine, which is uncharacteristic in the region. The vast majority of the area is covered in farmland and forest. The combination of the rugged terrain and extensive agriculture leads to significant runoff after storms, contributing to the many rapids along both rivers. One notable feature of the landscape is Platte Mound, which rises out of the relatively level surrounding terrain. This is the site of the world's largest letter M.

The rivers are part of the larger Grant-Platte Basin. The 455.07 miles (730 km) of streams comprising the Platte River watershed cover 197.74 square miles (512 km^{2}). The watershed of the Little Platte River, which spills into adjoining Iowa and Lafayette Counties, was considered part of the Platte River watershed when surveyed by the Wisconsin DNR in 1979. Its 184 miles (300 km) drain 154.94 square miles (401 km^{2}). All told, the combined watersheds drain 352.68 square miles (913 km^{2}), approximately 30% of Grant County.

== Communities ==
The largest communities within the combined watersheds are Platteville, Dickeyville, Potosi, Montfort, and Livingston. Dickeyville sits on the border of the two watersheds, while Livingston marks the three-way divide between the two watersheds and that of the Upper West Branch Pecatonica River.

U.S. Route 61 crosses immediately downstream of the confluence of the Platte and Little Platte Rivers. The University of Wisconsin–Platteville is the only four-year university or college in the basin.

Recreation in the area includes boating and whitewater canoeing and kayaking. Local fishing is also popular, with the most common species being smallmouth bass, channel catfish, and northern pike. Public access to the Platte River is limited. A county canoe trail was proposed in 2001, and the city of Platteville offers several parks and trails.

== Conservation ==
The regional importance of agriculture is reflected in the fact that cattle outnumber people in the area nearly 4 to 1. Farming's effect on natural resources in the watershed is described by the Wisconsin DNR: "Approximately 8.6 tons per acre per year of soil is lost from farm fields in the watershed. This watershed ranked second in the county as a 'priority area for erosion control.' DNR staff believe runoff from barnyards and feedlots, particularly in some headwaters areas, to be a severe problem in this watershed." According to a 2001 report, the main environmental issues are nonpoint source pollution in the forms of agricultural and urban runoff; soil erosion; mine waste; and a decline in the smallmouth bass population. The rivers empty into Pool 11 of the Mississippi River and are a major source of sediment. In 1997, the sedimentary discharge was estimated at 182 tons per square mile per year. In addition, Grant County has many abandoned galena mines that are cited as sources of pollution.

In addition to the DNR, local citizen groups are addressing conservation issues. The Friends of the Platte River, Inc. bills itself as a "group that exists to serve as a forum to address issues affecting the Platte/Little Platte River watershed and to seek impartial solutions that restore, enhance, and protect this valuable resource." Friends of the Platte River website

== See also ==
- List of rivers of Wisconsin
