= Saint Rose, Wisconsin =

- Unincorporated community
- Location within Wisconsin Location within the United States
- Coordinates: 42°37′26″N 90°26′04″W
- Country: United States
- State: Wisconsin
- County: Grant
- Town: Smelser
- Elevation: 1,024 ft (312 m)
- Time zone: UTC-6 (Central (CST))
  - Summer (DST): UTC-5 (CDT)
- Area code: 608
- GNIS feature ID: 1577808

Saint Rose is an unincorporated community located in the town of Smelser, Grant County, Wisconsin, United States.

== History ==
A post office called Saint Rose was in operation from 1856 until 1882. The community took its name from Saint Rose Catholic church.
