= Edward Rawlings =

American politician (1870–1955)

Edward Rawlings (4 May 1870 – 20 October 1955) was an American politician.

Rawlings was born in Platteville, Wisconsin, on 4 May 1870 and moved with his parents near Castana, Iowa, in 1875, where they farmed. By the time he was seventeen, both of Rawlings' parents had died. He was married to Effie Miller from 1896. The couple raised four sons, and moved to Onawa in 1903. Miller died on 8 January 1929.

Politically, Rawlings was affiliated with the Democratic Party. He served three terms, a total of seven years, as Monona County sheriff and was later elected to the school board. Between 1929 and 1935, Rawlings held the Iowa House of Representatives seat for District 57. He died on 20 October 1955 in Onawa and was buried in the local cemetery.
