= George Slack =

American politician

George W. Slack (April 2, 1874 – March 17, 1950) was an American farmer and politician.

Born in the Town of Smelser, Grant County, Wisconsin, Slack farmed near Big Patch, Wisconsin. Slack served on the town board and the Platteville, Wisconsin Common Council. He also served on the Grant County Board of Supervisors, the school board, and road commission.

In 1923 and 1925, Slack served in the Wisconsin State Assembly and was a Republican. Slack died at his home in Platteville, Wisconsin.
