= Elmo, Wisconsin =

- Unincorporated community
- Location within Wisconsin Location within the United States
- Coordinates: 42°38′34″N 90°26′09″W
- Country: United States
- State: Wisconsin
- County: Grant
- Town: Smelser
- Elevation: 1,014 ft (309 m)
- Time zone: UTC-6 (Central (CST))
  - Summer (DST): UTC-5 (CDT)
- Area code: 608
- GNIS feature ID: 1577587

Elmo is an unincorporated community located in the town of Smelser, Grant County, Wisconsin, United States.

== History ==
A post office called Elmo was established in 1875, and remained in operation until it was discontinued in 1924. The community was named after the 1866 novel St. Elmo by Augusta Jane Evans.
