= James Ballantine House =

Historic house in Wisconsin, United States

- U.S. National Register of Historic Places
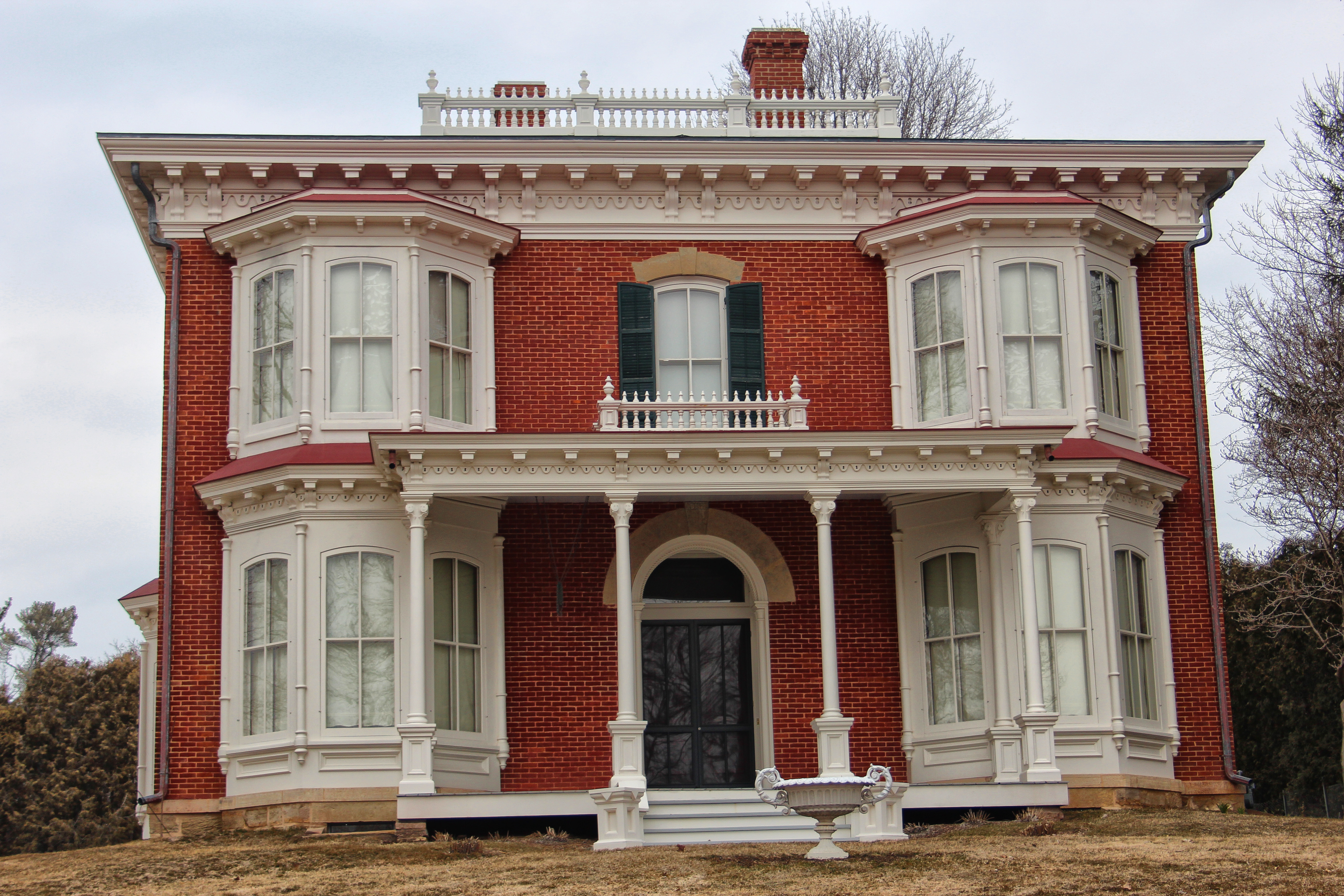
- James Ballantine House in 2013

- Location within Wisconsin Location within the United States
- Location: 720 North 4th Street, Bloomington, Wisconsin
- Coordinates: 42°53′16″N 90°55′34″W
- Area: less than one acre
- Built: 1877
- Architectural style: Italianate
- NRHP reference No.: 76000062
- Added to NRHP: June 7, 1976

The James Ballantine House is located in Bloomington, Wisconsin.

== History ==
After losing a leg earlier in life, James Ballantine would go on to become involved in money lending, along with growing plants and livestock. The house was listed on the National Register of Historic Places in 1976 and on the State Register of Historic Places in 1989.
