= Platteville (town), Wisconsin =

Town in Grant County, Wisconsin

Platteville, Wisconsin
- Town
- Town of Platteville
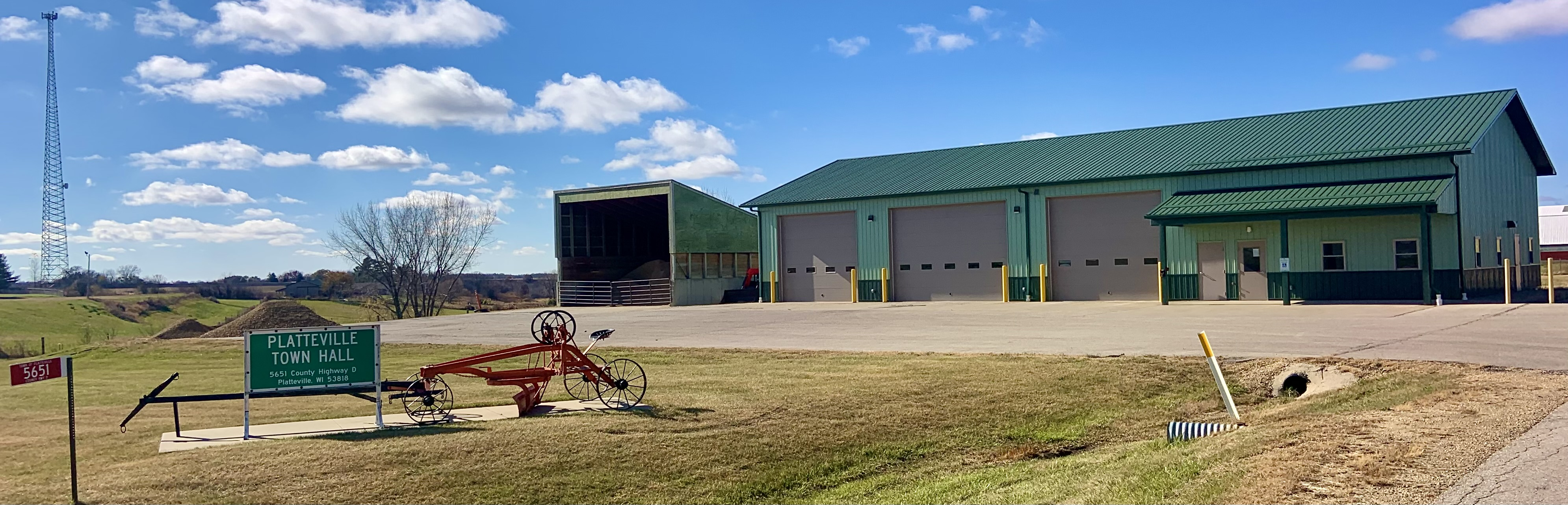
- Platteville Town Hall

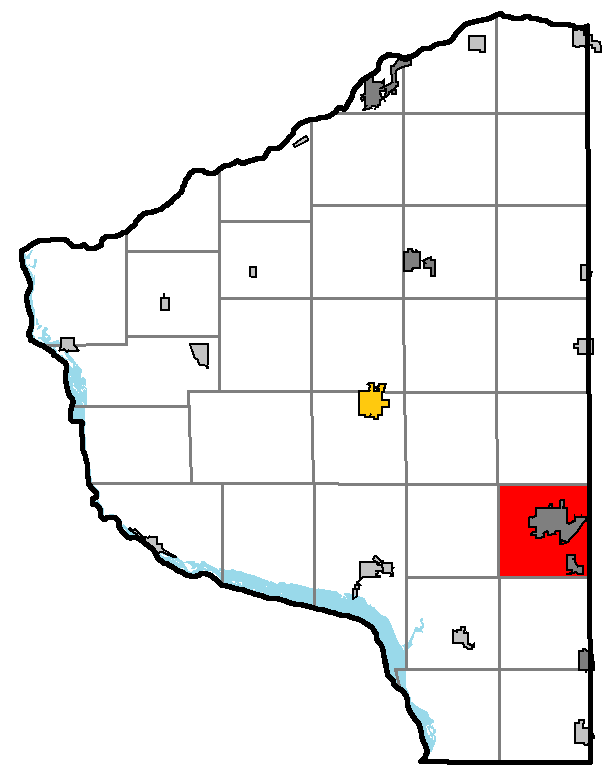
- Location of Platteville within Grant County, Wisconsin

- Location of Grant County, Wisconsin
- Coordinates: 42°42′13″N 90°30′55″W
- Country: United States
- State: Wisconsin
- County: Grant

Area
  - Total: 30.08 sq mi (77.9 km^{2})
  - Land: 30.08 sq mi (77.9 km^{2})
  - Water: 0 sq mi (0 km^{2})

Population (2020)
  - Total: 1,513
  - Density: 50.30/sq mi (19.42/km^{2})
- Time zone: UTC-6 (Central (CST))
  - Summer (DST): UTC-5 (CDT)
- ZIP Code: 53818
- Area code(s): 608 and 353
- GNIS feature ID: 1583934
- Website: www.townofplatteville.com

Platteville is a town in Grant County, Wisconsin, United States. The population was 1,513 at the 2020 United States census. The city of Platteville is within the town, but is politically independent.

== Geography ==
According to the United States Census Bureau, the town has a total area of 32.1 square miles (83.2 km^{2}), all land.

== Demographics ==
At the 2000 United States census there were 1,343 people, 475 households, and 378 families living in the town. The population density was 41.8 inhabitants per square mile (16.1/km^{2}). There were 493 housing units at an average density of 15.4 per square mile (5.9/km^{2}). The racial makeup of the town was 96.72% White, 0.30% Black or African American, 0.15% Native American, 1.56% Asian, 0.22% from other races, and 1.04% from two or more races. 0.22% of the population were Hispanic or Latino of any race. Of the 475 households 34.1% had children under the age of 18 living with them, 69.1% were married couples living together, 6.7% had a female householder with no husband present, and 20.4% were non-families. 16.0% of households were one person and 4.6% were one person aged 65 or older. The average household size was 2.81 and the average family size was 3.11.

The age distribution was 27.4% under the age of 18, 8.8% from 18 to 24, 25.1% from 25 to 44, 27.2% from 45 to 64, and 11.5% 65 or older. The median age was 38 years. For every 100 females, there were 103.8 males. For every 100 females age 18 and over, there were 101.9 males.

The median household income was $43,553 and the median family income was $47,639. Males had a median income of $33,750 versus $20,054 for females. The per capita income for the town was $18,886. About 8.3% of families and 12.2% of the population were below the poverty line, including 15.5% of those under age 18 and 6.5% of those age 65 or over.
