= Allen Wells =

American politician (1856–1918)

A. V. Wells
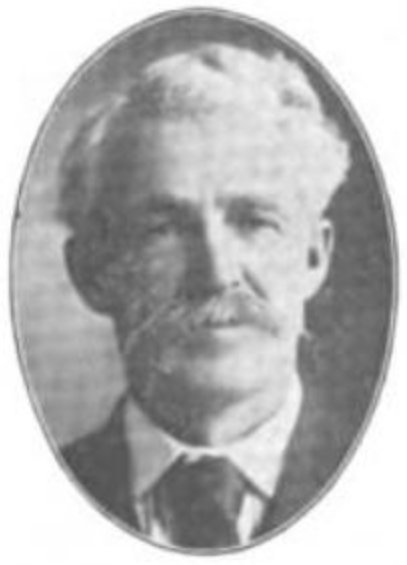

Member of the Wisconsin State Assembly
- In office 1908–1916
- Constituency: Grant County First District

Personal details
- Born: Allen Victor Wells; January 13, 1856 Grant County, Wisconsin
- Died: August 11, 1918 (aged 62) Livingston, Wisconsin
- Party: Republican
- Spouse: Laurinda Ann Hudson (m. 1899)
- Education: University of Wisconsin–Platteville; Columbia University College of Physicians and Surgeons; Rush Medical College
- Occupation: Farmer, politician

Allen Victor Wells (January 13, 1856 – August 11, 1918) was a member of the Wisconsin State Assembly.

== Biography ==
Wells was born on January 13, 1856, in Grant County, Wisconsin. He married Laurinda Ann Hudson in 1899. Wells served on the Grant County Board of Supervisors. He attended what is now the University of Wisconsin–Platteville, the Columbia University College of Physicians and Surgeons and Rush Medical College.

Wells died on his farm near Livingston in 1918. A memorial commemorating him was adopted by the Wisconsin legislature in January 1919.

== Career ==
Wells was elected to the Assembly in 1908 and re-elected in 1910 and 1914, where he served on the Towns and Counties Committee. He was a Republican.
