= Hazel Green Town Hall =

- U.S. National Register of Historic Places
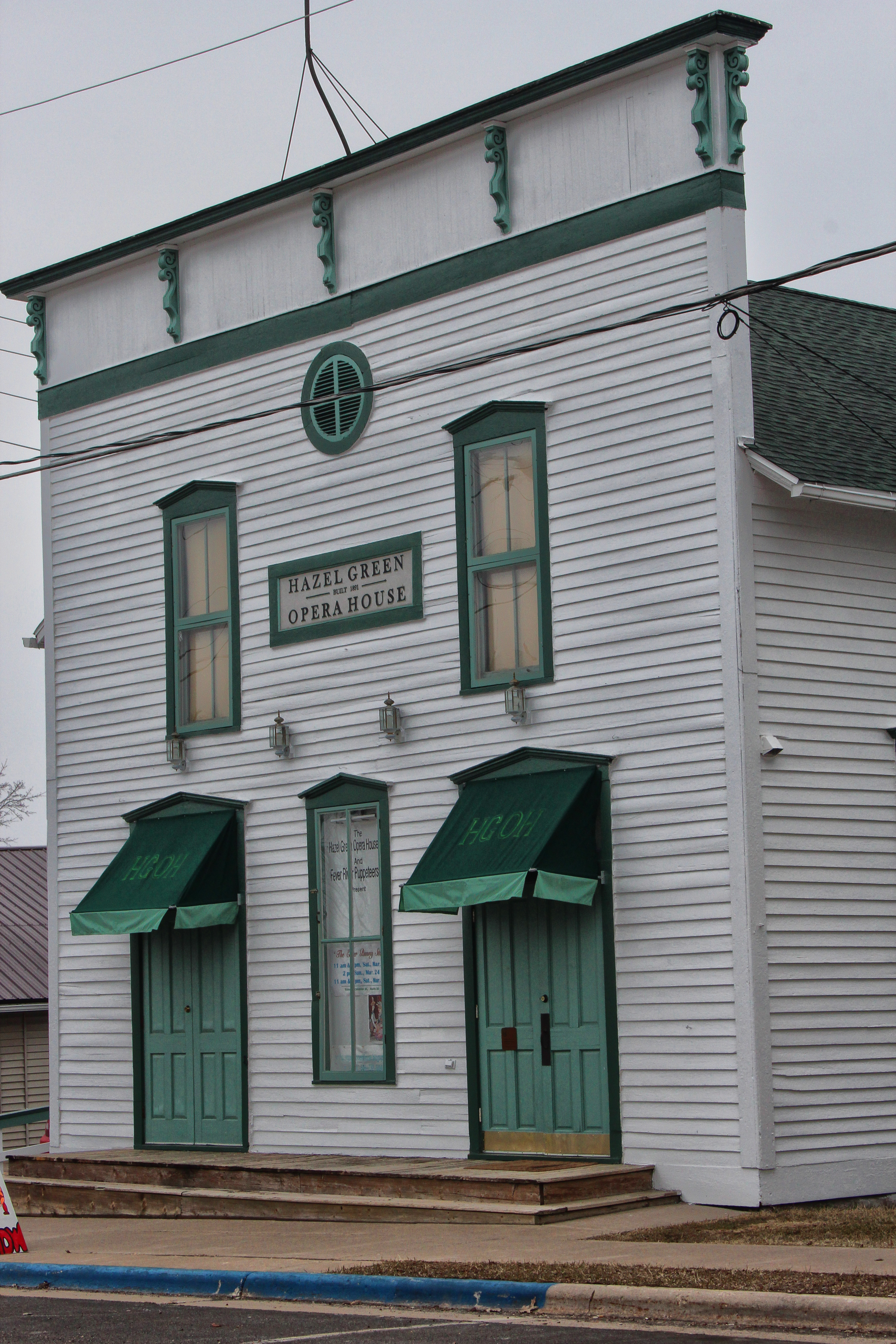
- Building in 2013

- Location within Wisconsin Location within the United States
- Interactive map showing the location of Hazel Green Town Hall
- Location: 2130 N. Main St., Hazel Green, Wisconsin
- Coordinates: 42°32′0″N 90°26′5″W
- Area: less than one acre
- Built: 1891
- Built by: William A. Hocking
- Architectural style: Boom Town vernacular
- NRHP reference No.: 88003231
- Added to NRHP: January 26, 1989

The Hazel Green Town Hall is a historic building in the village of Hazel Green, Wisconsin. Built in 1891, the building housed both the town clerk's office and the Hazel Green Opera House, a civic auditorium. The auditorium hosted town meetings, graduation ceremonies, religious events, and entertainers; it also served as the town's jail when necessary, as a cage could be added to the stage. The auditorium closed in the 1920s; the building is now private property.

The building was designed in the Boom Town style, which features a large facade in front of a smaller building. The facade has a tall bracketed cornice, while the building has a gable front.

The Hazel Green Town Hall was added to the National Register of Historic Places on January 26, 1989.
