= Main Street Commercial Historic District (Platteville, Wisconsin) =

Historic district in Wisconsin, United States

- U.S. National Register of Historic Places
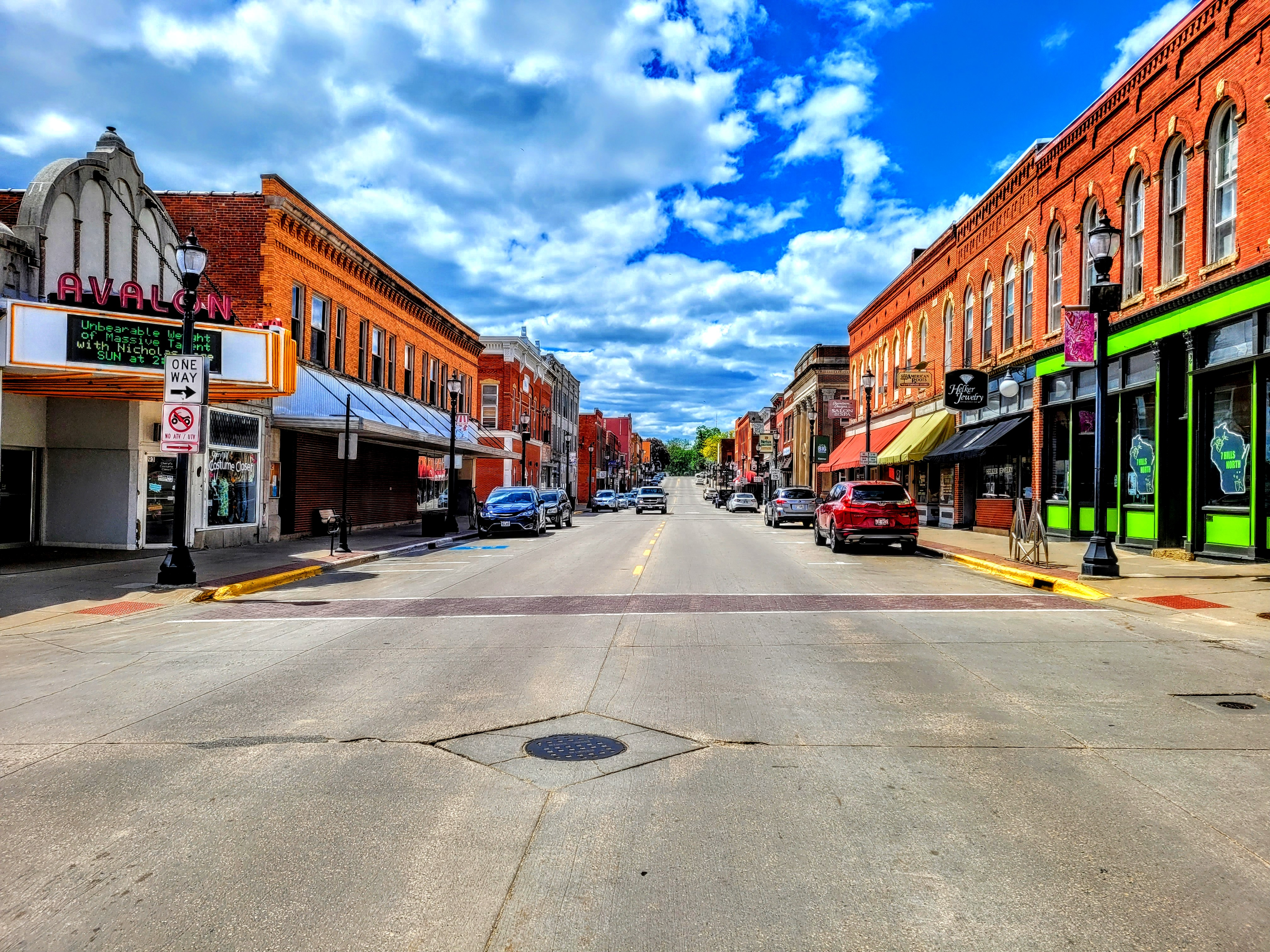
- Main Street facing west
- Location: Roughly bounded by Chestnut, Furnace, Bonson, Mineral, Oak, and Pine, Platteville, Wisconsin
- Area: 12 acres (4.9 ha)
- Built: 1848
- NRHP reference No.: 90000377
- Added to NRHP: March 9, 1990

The Main Street Commercial Historic District is located in Platteville, Wisconsin.

== Description ==
The district includes the area of Platteville's early business districts on Second Street and Main, platted like an English village with narrow streets, narrow lots, and a village green. Includes the 1847 Federal-styled Parnell Building (pictured), the 1853 Hendershot Harness Shop, the 1876 Italianate Kettler building, the 1906 Italianate Wedige Saloon, the 1906 Queen Anne Dr. Cunningham house, the 1914 Tudor Revival Carnegie Library, the 1924 Neoclassical First National Bank, and the 1938 Art Deco Municipal Building.

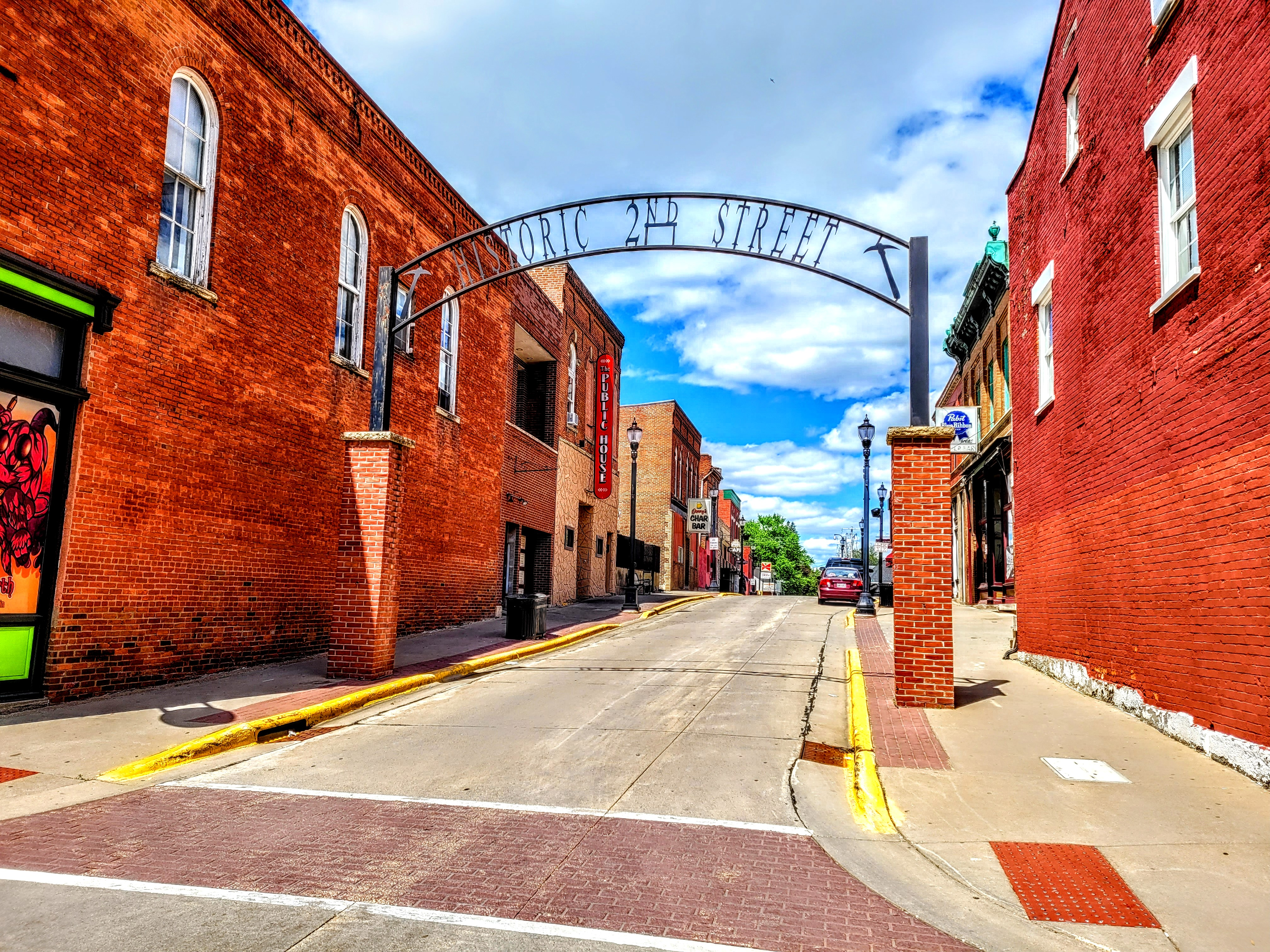
Platteville, Wisconsin Main Street looking West
