= J. H. Rountree Mansion =

Historic house in Wisconsin, United States

- Rountree, J. H., Mansion
- U.S. National Register of Historic Places
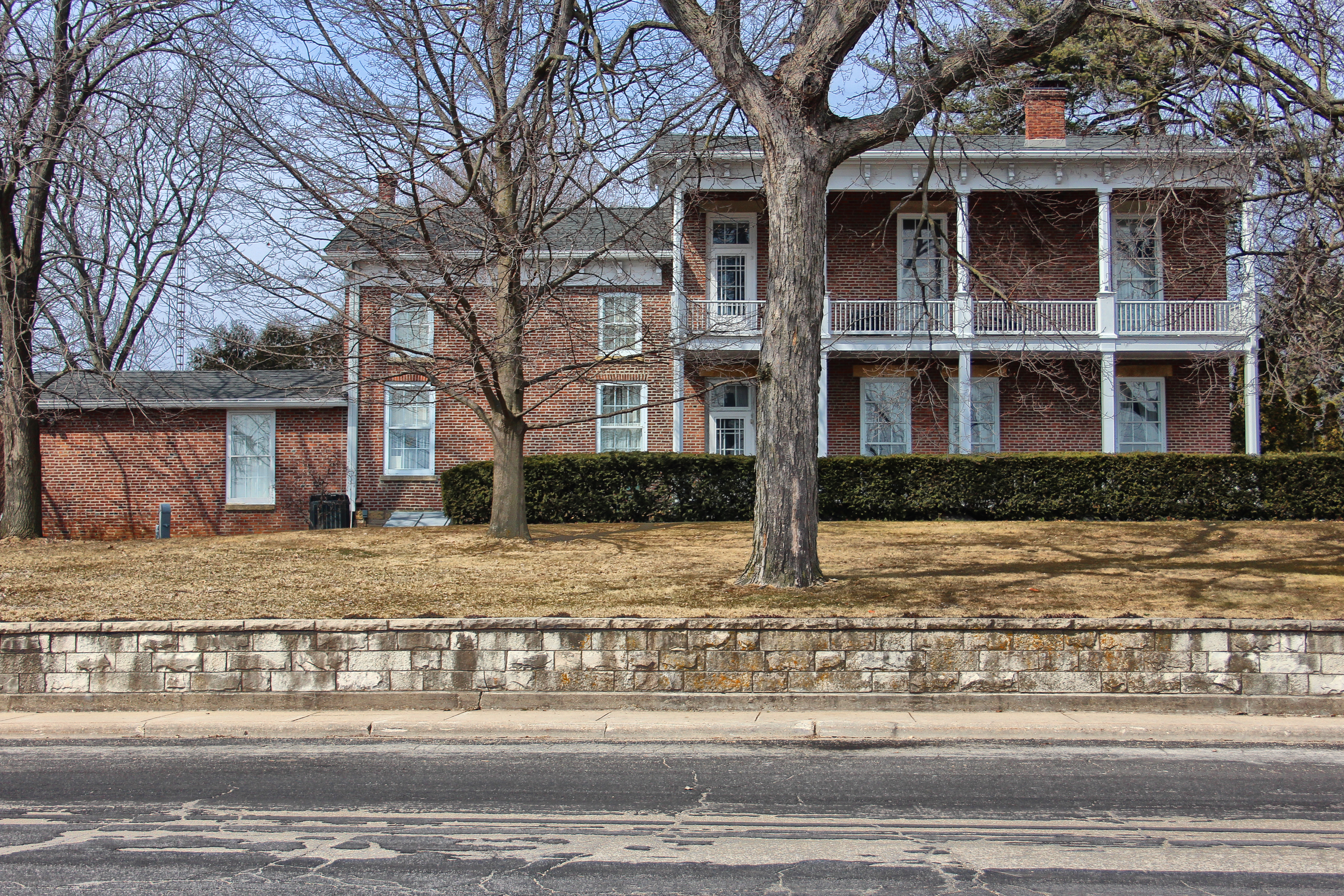
- J. H. Rountree Mansion
- Location: 150 Rountree Ave., Platteville, Wisconsin
- Coordinates: 42°43′56″N 90°28′41″W
- Area: less than one acre
- Built: 1854
- Architectural style: Neoclassical, Greek Revival
- NRHP reference No.: 86001307
- Added to NRHP: June 13, 1986

The J. H. Rountree Mansion is located in Platteville, Wisconsin.

== History ==
John H. Rountree was one of the founders of Platteville. He was a veteran of the Black Hawk War who served in the Wisconsin State Senate and the Wisconsin State Assembly. The house remained in Rountree's family for several decades before one of his descendants left the house to the state. For a number of years, it was used as the residence for the Chancellor of what is now the University of Wisconsin-Platteville.

The house was listed on the National Register of Historic Places in 1986 and on the State Register of Historic Places in 1989. The Mitchell-Rountree House is also located in Platteville. Rountree built it for his father-in-law, Samuel Mitchell, an American Revolutionary War veteran who served as a Methodist Episcopal clergyman.
