= Adelbert L. Utt =

American politician from Wisconsin (1856–1936)

Adelbert L. "Del" Utt (June 11, 1856 – April 8, 1936) was an American farmer, businessman, and politician.

Born in the town of Harrison, Grant County, Wisconsin, Utt went to public school and to Platteville State Normal School in Platteville, Wisconsin, where he lived. He was involved in farming and in livestock, and in the furniture, farm implement and hardware business. He worked for the Wisconsin Zinc Company and was an ore buyer. Utt was town treasurer and justice of the peace. From 1895 to 1899, he sat in the Wisconsin State Assembly as a Republican.

Utt died in a hospital in Platteville after a short illness.
