= Mitchell-Rountree House =

Historic building in Platteville, Wisconsin

- U.S. National Register of Historic Places
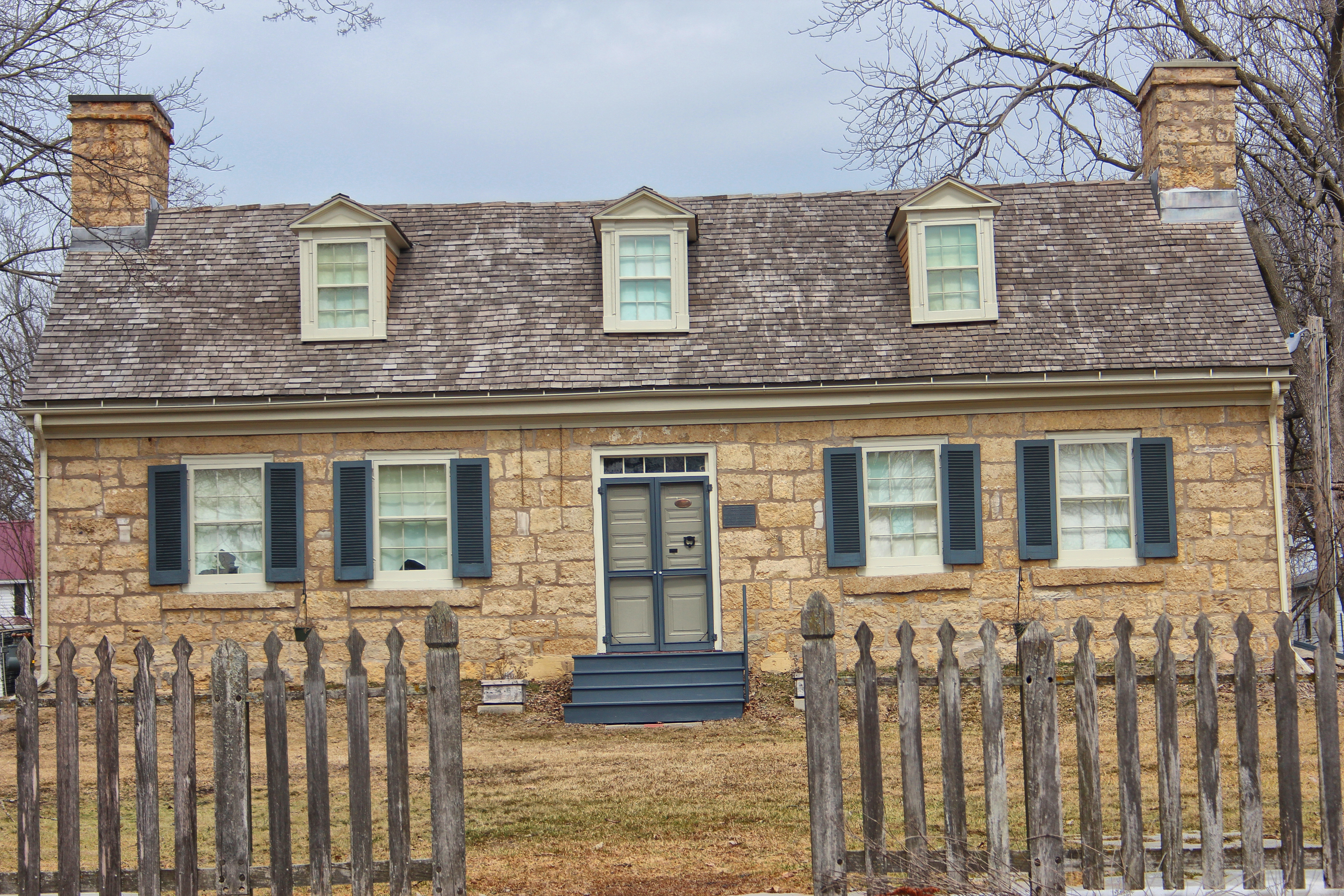
- Mitchell-Rountree House
- Location: Jewett and Lancaster Sts., Platteville, Wisconsin
- Coordinates: 42°44′29″N 90°28′57″W
- Area: 0.3 acres (0.12 ha)
- Built: 1837
- Architect: John H. Rountree
- Architectural style: American colonial
- NRHP reference No.: 72000052
- Added to NRHP: February 23, 1972

The Mitchell-Rountree House is located in Platteville, Wisconsin.

It is an early 1.5-story cottage built of carefully fit dolomite for Rev. Samuel Mitchell in a style from his native Virginia. Mitchell had served in the Revolutionary War. John Rountree, founder of Platteville, married Mitchell's daughter, probably built the house, and Rountrees lived there for many years.

== History ==
Samuel Mitchell was an American Revolutionary War veteran who had retired to the area after serving as Methodist Episcopal clergy in Virginia and Illinois. His son, Rev. John T. Mitchell, was appointed as the first pastor of the Platteville Methodist Episcopal Church in 1832. John H. Rountree was Mitchell's son-in-law. One of the founders of Platteville, he was a veteran of the Black Hawk War and served in the Wisconsin State Senate and the Wisconsin State Assembly. The house currently serves as a museum. It was listed on the National Register of Historic Places in 1972 and on the State Register of Historic Places in 1989.

The J. H. Rountree Mansion, a personal residence that Rountree later built for himself and his family, is also located in Platteville and listed on the National Register.
