= Bayley Avenue Historic District =

- U.S. National Register of Historic Places
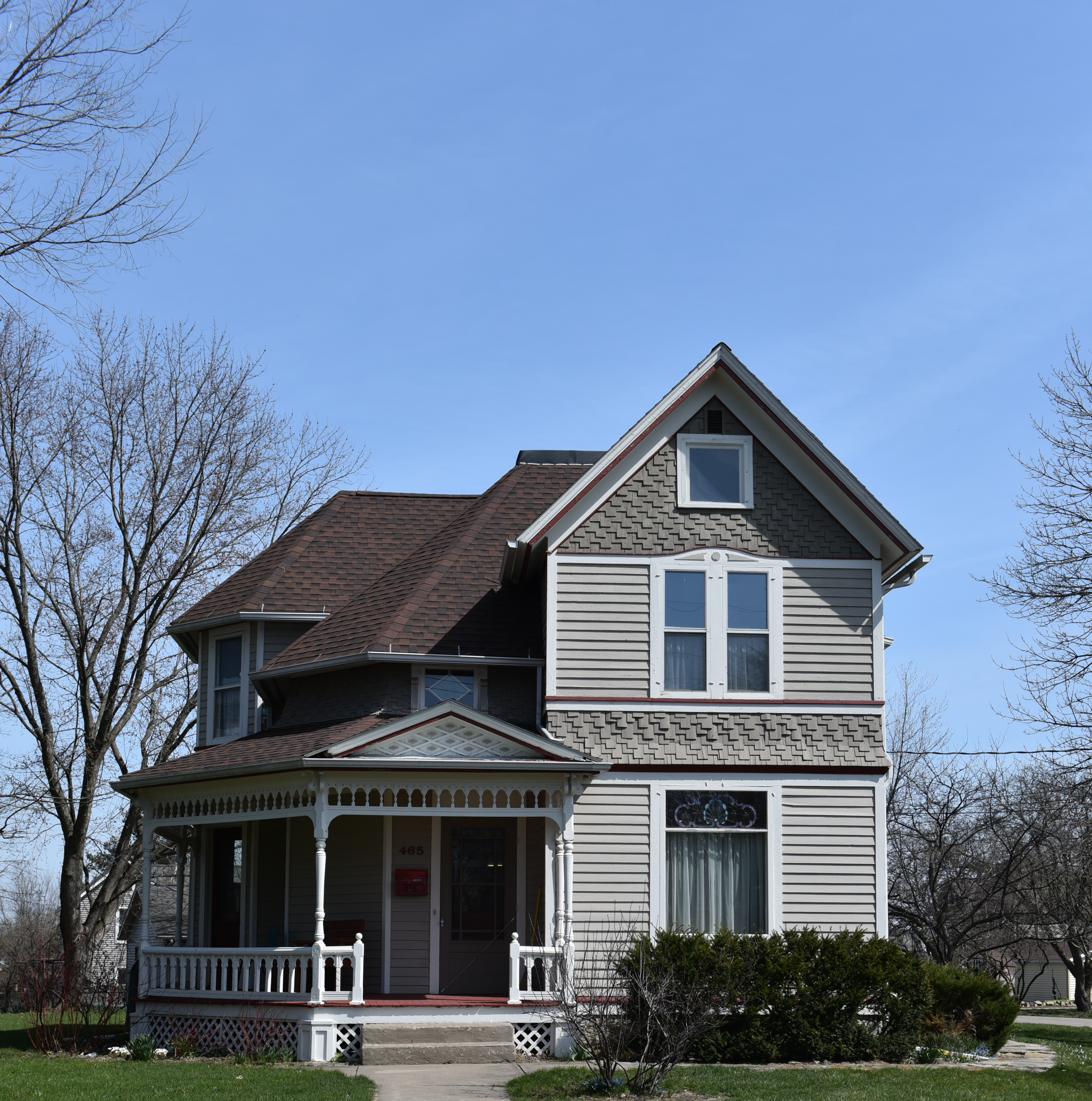

- Location within Wisconsin Location within the United States
- Location: 100-400 Bayley Av., 400 Blk. S Court St., 150, 210, 270 Rountree Av. & 65 Mitchell Av. Platteville, Wisconsin
- Coordinates: 42°43′52″N 90°28′46″W
- NRHP reference No.: 07000708
- Added to NRHP: July 19, 2007

The Bayley Avenue Historic District is a residential historic district in central Platteville, Wisconsin. The district encompasses 29 homes and a local park. It was added to the National Register of Historic Places in 2007.

== History ==
The land that the district is now located on was once owned by John H. Rountree, the founder of Platteville. Contributing buildings in the district were constructed from 1853 to 1940; the majority were built in the 1890s and 1910s, when Platteville experienced significant growth due to local zinc mining. Nearly half of the houses in the district have Queen Anne designs, as the style was popular across the United States in the 1890s. The district also includes examples of the Greek Revival, American Craftsman, and Georgian Revival styles and multiple vernacular homes.
