= Charles Watson (Wisconsin legislator) =

American politician

Charles Watson (September 1, 1836 – August 22, 1910) was a member of the Wisconsin State Assembly in 1880. A resident of Washburn, Wisconsin, he was a member of the Republican Party. He was born in County Wicklow, Ireland; he emigrated to the United States in 1852 and settled in Wisconsin in 1853.
