= Hanmer Robbins =

American politician

Hanmer Robbins (December 11, 1815 – July 9, 1890) was a teacher from Platteville, Wisconsin who served several times as a member of the Wisconsin State Assembly.

He was born in Deerfield, New York. He moved to Platteville, Wisconsin in May 1837 and began teaching the village school. Besides teaching, he also was a farmer and miner. On June 1, 1847, he married Annette L. Goodell. They had seven children.

== Career ==
Robbins opened a school in a log house with 60 students in attendance. He taught for a few years in that structure until additional schools were developed.

Robbins was town superintendent of schools from 1854 to 1860. He was a member of the State Board of Regents for Normal Schools for ten years and made significant contributions towards the creation of multiple normal schools across the state.

Robbins was a member of the Assembly on four occasions: from 1857 to 1858, in 1861, in 1864, and from 1867 to 1868. Later, Robbins was an unsuccessful candidate for the Assembly, losing to Thomas G. Stephens. He was a Republican.

He contributed to the development of the railroad through Platteville by gathering funds. The track, finished within three years, ran through Platteville in 1870.

His greatest contribution was his dedication to public education in Platteville. Fifteen years after his death, the Hanmer Robbins school was built in 1905. It was Platteville's first official high school. In 1981, the building was repurposed as part of the Rollo Jamison museum.
