= Division Street Historic District (Platteville, Wisconsin) =

Historic district in Wisconsin, United States

- U.S. National Register of Historic Places
- U.S. Historic district
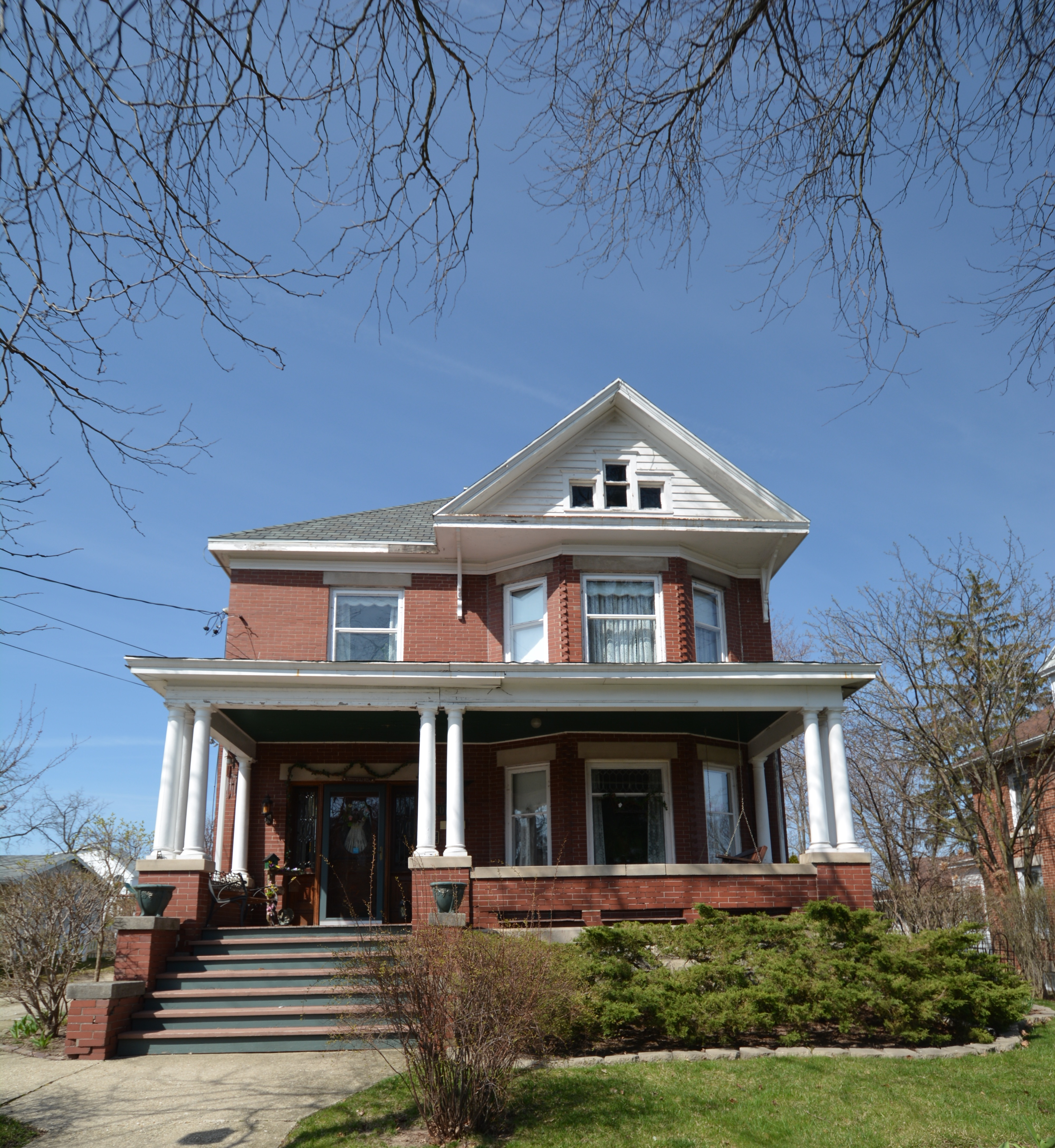

- Location within Wisconsin Location within the United States
- Location: Platteville, Wisconsin
- NRHP reference No.: 07000709
- Added to NRHP: July 19, 2007

The Division Street Historic District is a historic residential district in Platteville, Wisconsin, United States. It was added to the National Register of Historic Places in 2007.

== History ==
The land that the district is now on was once known as Henry's Addition, platted in 1858. Only four houses were built there until the 1890s, when Platteville's mining industry surged. Most of the houses that are still there were built between 1894 and 1908 - mostly Queen Anne style and American Foursquare. Contributing buildings in the district were constructed from 1894 to 1926.
