= Ensign Dickinson =

American politician

Ensign P. Dickinson (May 26, 1819 – October 10, 1897) was a member of the Wisconsin State Assembly.

== Biography ==
Dickinson was born on May 26, 1819, in Johnston Township, Trumbull County, Ohio. He moved to Platteville, Wisconsin, in 1844. He died on October 10, 1897.

== Career ==
Dickinson was a member of the Assembly in 1883. Additionally, he was Treasurer, Assessor and Chairman of the Board of Platteville. He was a Republican.
