= William Brandon (Wisconsin politician) =

American politician

William Brandon (September 23, 1815 – July 31, 1891) was a member of the Wisconsin State Assembly during the 1862 and 1865 sessions.

Brandon was born in Paris, Kentucky, the son of Joseph Brandon and Margaret Kelly Brandon. In Wisconsin, he was a Republican and was affiliated with the National Union Party during his second term. His address was in what is now officially Smelser, Wisconsin. He later relocated to Iowa, where he died in Kingsley in 1891.
