= Bigpatch, Wisconsin =

- unincorporated community
- Location within Wisconsin Location within the United States
- Coordinates: 42°40′00″N 90°28′34″W
- Country: United States
- State: Wisconsin
- County: Grant
- Town: Smelser
- Time zone: UTC-6 (Central (CST))
  - Summer (DST): UTC-5 (CDT)
- Area code: 608

Bigpatch or Big Patch (formerly Kaysville) is an unincorporated community located in the town of Smelser, in Grant County, Wisconsin, United States. Welsh miners in the area named the community for a “patch” of lead ore nearby.

== Notable people ==
- George Cabanis, Wisconsin State Assembly
- Arthur W. Kopp, United States House of Representatives
