= Harrison, Grant County, Wisconsin =

Town of Harrison
- Town
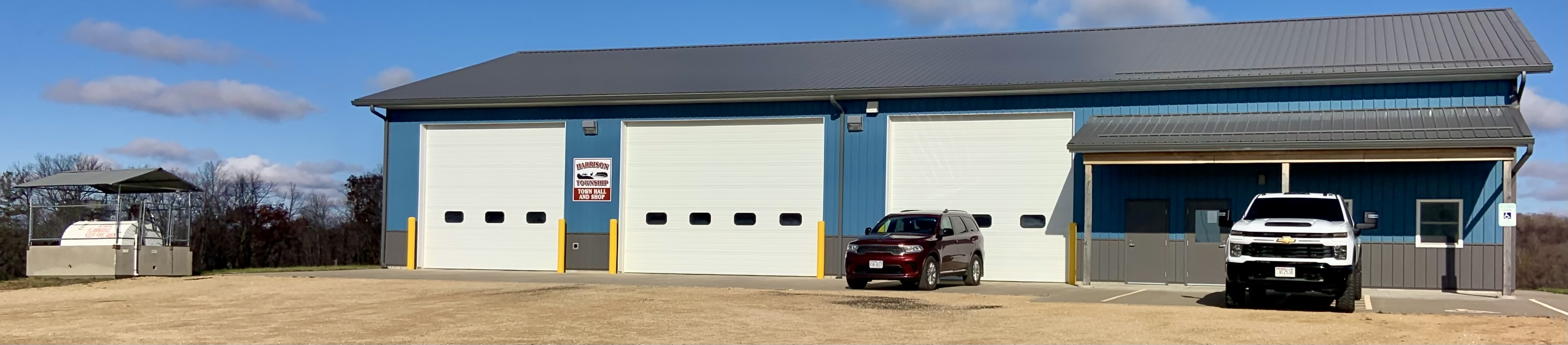
- Town hall

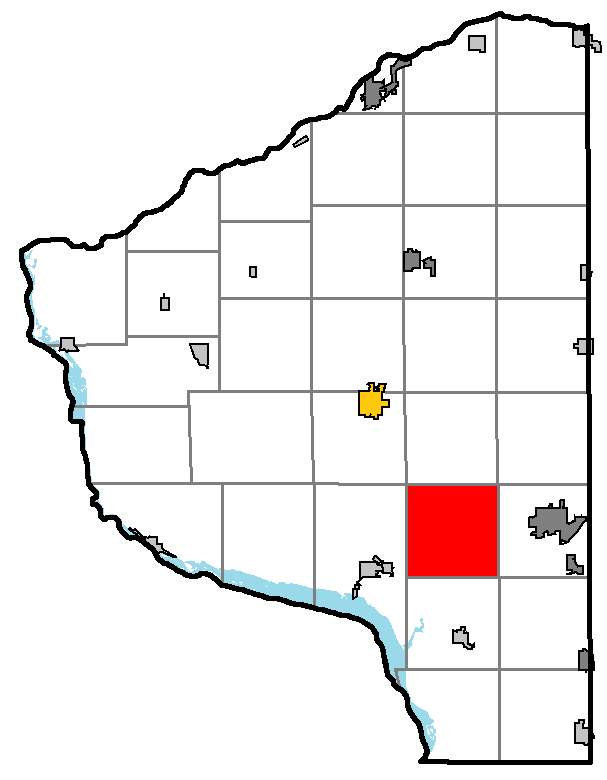
- Location of the Town of Harrison, within Grant County, Wisconsin

- Location of Grant County, Wisconsin
- Coordinates: 42°43′19″N 90°37′20″W
- Country: United States
- State: Wisconsin
- County: Grant

Area
  - Total: 36.1 sq mi (93.6 km^{2})
  - Land: 36.1 sq mi (93.6 km^{2})
  - Water: 0 sq mi (0.0 km^{2})
- Elevation: 889 ft (271 m)

Population (2020)
  - Total: 529
  - Density: 14.6/sq mi (5.65/km^{2})
- Time zone: UTC-6 (Central (CST))
  - Summer (DST): UTC-5 (CDT)
- Area code: 608
- FIPS code: 55-32825
- GNIS feature ID: 1583355

The Town of Harrison is a town in Grant County, Wisconsin, United States. The population was 529 at the 2020 census. The unincorporated community of Cornelia is located in the town.

== Geography ==
According to the United States Census Bureau, the town has a total area of 36.1 square miles (93.6 km^{2}), all land.

== Demographics ==
At the 2000 census there were 497 people, 176 households, and 148 families living in the town. The population density was 13.8 people per square mile (5.3/km^{2}). There were 186 housing units at an average density of 5.1 per square mile (2.0/km^{2}). The racial makeup of the town was 98.39% White, 0.20% Asian, 0.40% from other races, and 1.01% from two or more races. Hispanic or Latino of any race were 0.80%.

Of the 176 households 38.6% had children under the age of 18 living with them, 75.6% were married couples living together, 4.0% had a female householder with no husband present, and 15.9% were non-families. 11.9% of households were one person and 4.0% were one person aged 65 or older. The average household size was 2.82 and the average family size was 3.06.

The age distribution was 27.4% under the age of 18, 7.2% from 18 to 24, 28.6% from 25 to 44, 28.6% from 45 to 64, and 8.2% 65 or older. The median age was 38 years. For every 100 females, there were 106.2 males. For every 100 females age 18 and over, there were 111.1 males.

The median household income was $45,375 and the median family income was $47,125. Males had a median income of $26,000 versus $20,592 for females. The per capita income for the town was $16,647. About 4.5% of families and 6.9% of the population were below the poverty line, including 11.3% of those under age 18 and none of those age 65 or over.

== Notable people ==
- Adelbert L. Utt, farmer, businessman, politician, was born in the town
