= Thomas Jenkins (Wisconsin politician, born 1832) =

American politician

Thomas Jenkins (June 28, 1832 – August 15, 1911) was a member of the Wisconsin State Assembly.

Jenkins was born on June 28, 1832, in Cornwall, England. He settled in Platteville, Wisconsin, where he served as postmaster. He was also a member of the state board of normal school regents.
