= Smelser, Wisconsin =

Town of Smelser
- Town
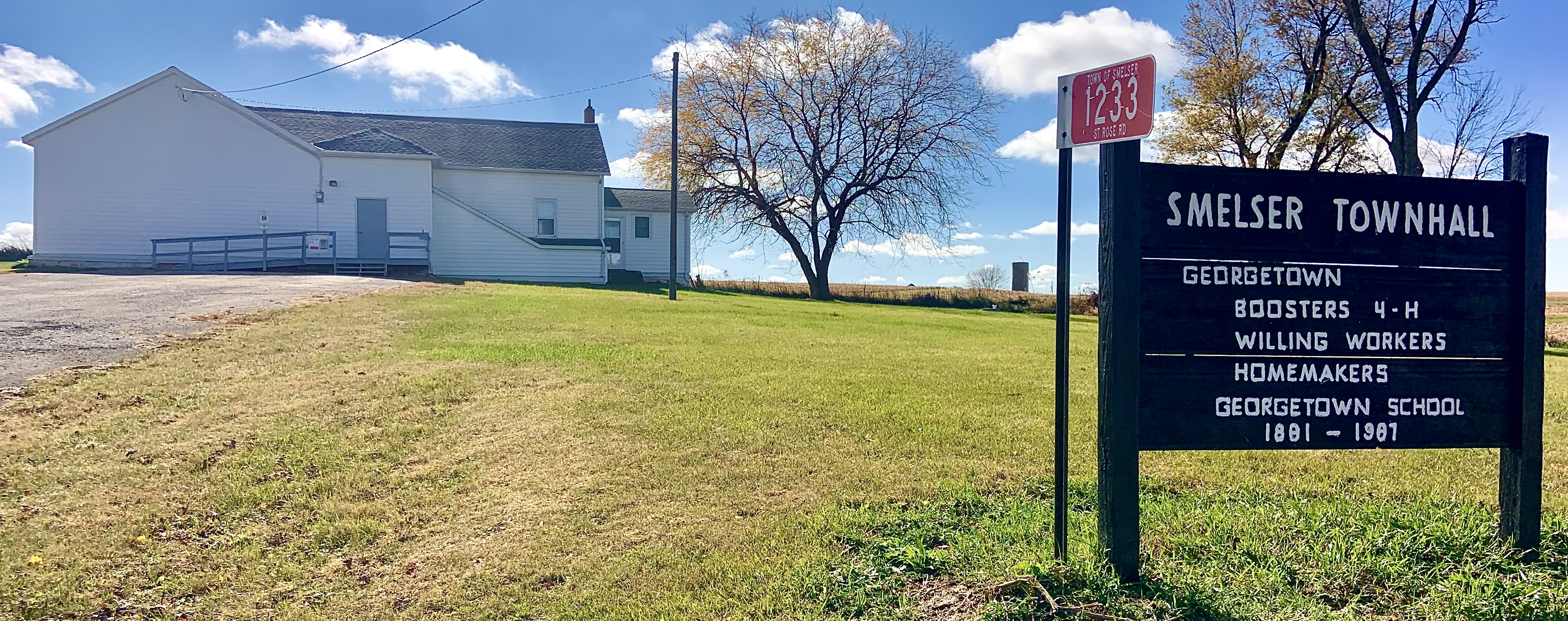
- Town hall

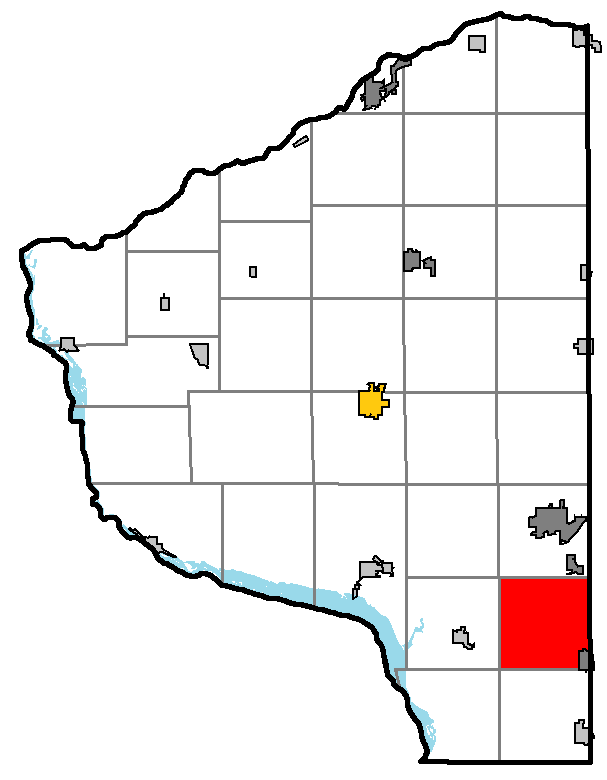
- Location of the Town of Smelser, within Grant County, Wisconsin

- Location of Grant County, Wisconsin
- Coordinates: 42°38′24″N 90°29′28″W
- Country: United States
- State: Wisconsin
- County: Grant

Area
  - Total: 35.1 sq mi (90.9 km^{2})
  - Land: 35.1 sq mi (90.9 km^{2})
  - Water: 0 sq mi (0.0 km^{2})
- Elevation: 925 ft (282 m)

Population (2020)
  - Total: 786
  - Density: 22.4/sq mi (8.65/km^{2})
- Time zone: UTC-6 (Central (CST))
  - Summer (DST): UTC-5 (CDT)
- Area code: 608
- FIPS code: 55-74450
- GNIS feature ID: 1584169
- Website: http://www.townofsmelser.com/

The Town of Smelser is located in southeastern Grant County, Wisconsin, United States. The population was 786 at the 2020 census. The unincorporated communities of Bigpatch, Elmo, Georgetown, and Saint Rose are located in the town.

== History of the name ==
The town was also known as Smeltzer or Smeltzer's Grove (the latter being technically the name of the post office in the town); this name appears, for instance in the original Wisconsin Constitution and the first edition of the Wisconsin Blue Book, and will occasionally be found in official use at least as late as 1870. Butterfield's 1881 History of Grant County describes early settler J. M. Smelser as "a native of Bourbon Co., Kentucky."

== Geography ==
According to the United States Census Bureau, the town has a total area of 35.1 square miles (90.9 km^{2}), all land.

== Demographics ==
As of the census of 2000, there were 756 people, 268 households, and 218 families residing in the town. The population density was 21.5 people per square mile (8.3/km^{2}). There were 276 housing units at an average density of 7.9 per square mile (3.0/km^{2}). The racial makeup of the town was 99.34% White, 0.13% African American, and 0.53% from two or more races.

There were 268 households, out of which 34.3% had children under the age of 18 living with them, 72.8% were married couples living together, 6.0% had a female householder with no husband present, and 18.3% were non-families. 15.7% of all households were made up of individuals, and 6.0% had someone living alone who was 65 years of age or older. The average household size was 2.82 and the average family size was 3.12.

The population was 27.8% under the age of 18, 6.6% from 18 to 24, 27.4% from 25 to 44, 25.7% from 45 to 64, and 12.6% who were 65 years of age or older. The median age was 39 years. For every 100 females, there were 99 males. For every 100 females age 18 and over, there were 104 males.

The median income for a household in the town was $41,429, and the median income for a family was $44,125. Males had a median income of $30,417 versus $20,682 for females. The per capita income for the town was $15,652. About 5.5% of families and 5.2% of the population were below the poverty line, including 5.5% of those under age 18 and 21.4% of those age 65 or over.

== Notable people ==
- William Brandon, state legislator
- George Cabanis, state legislator
- George Slack, state legislator
