= Platteville, Wisconsin =

City in Grant County, Wisconsin

- City
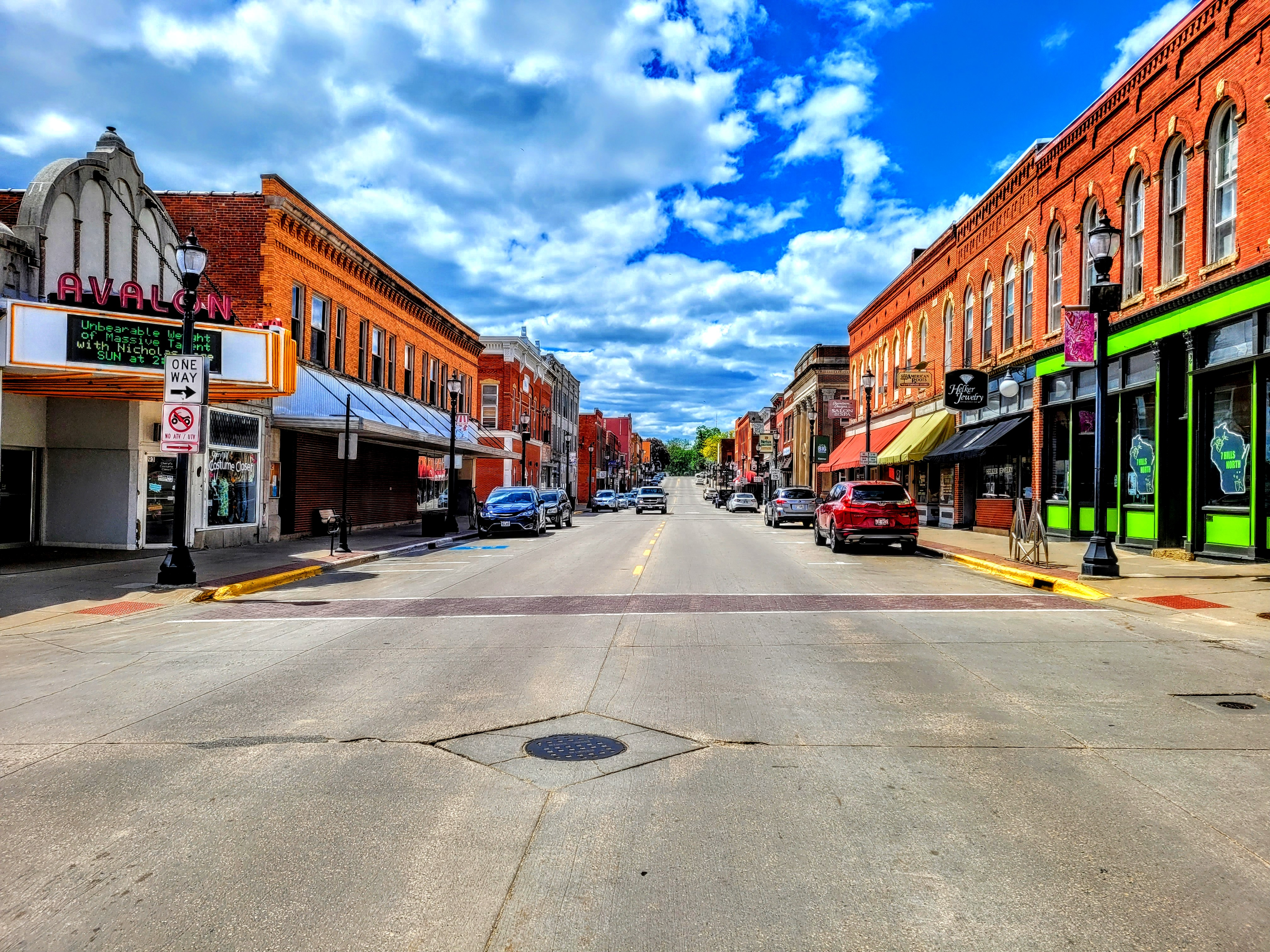
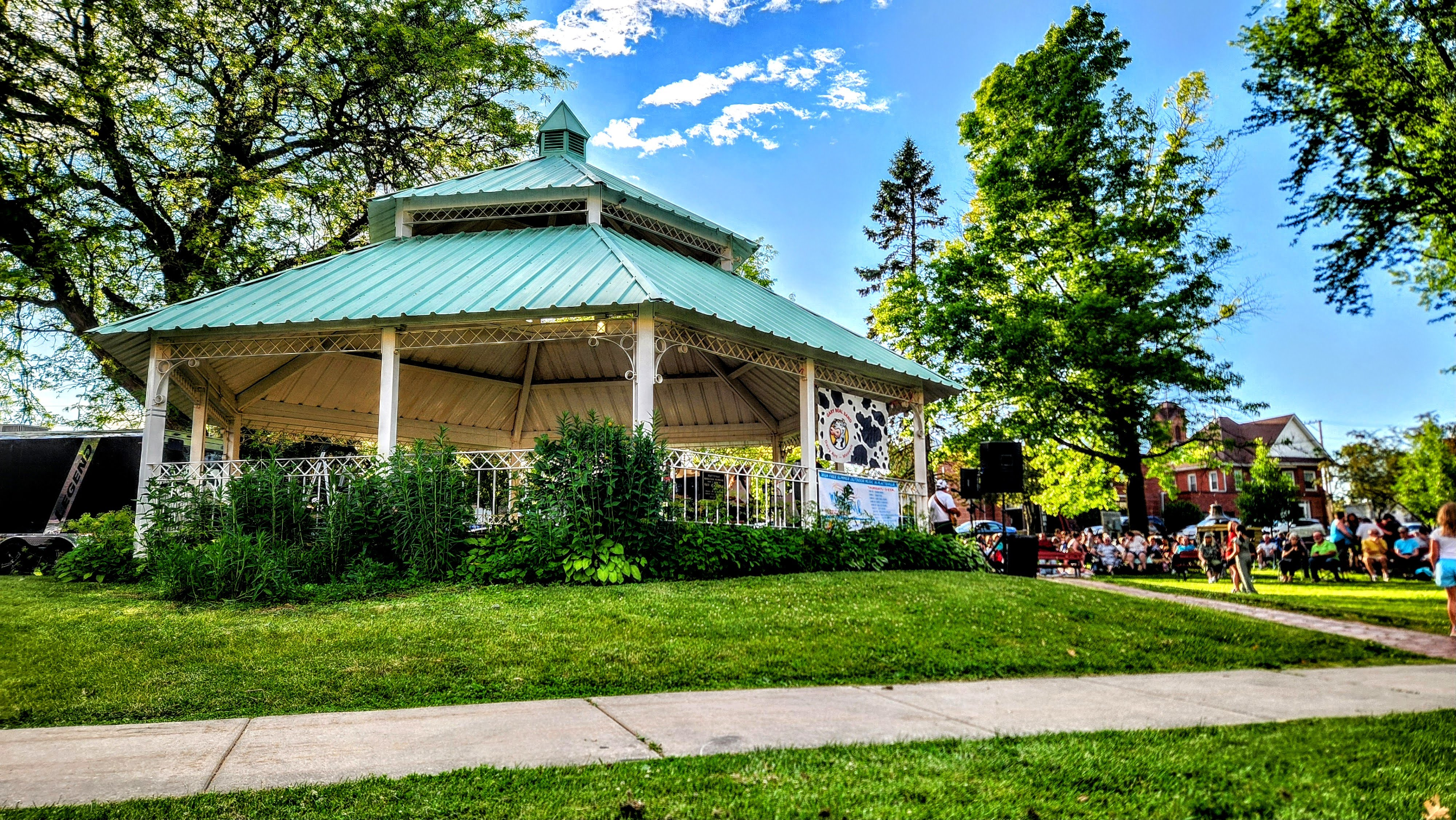
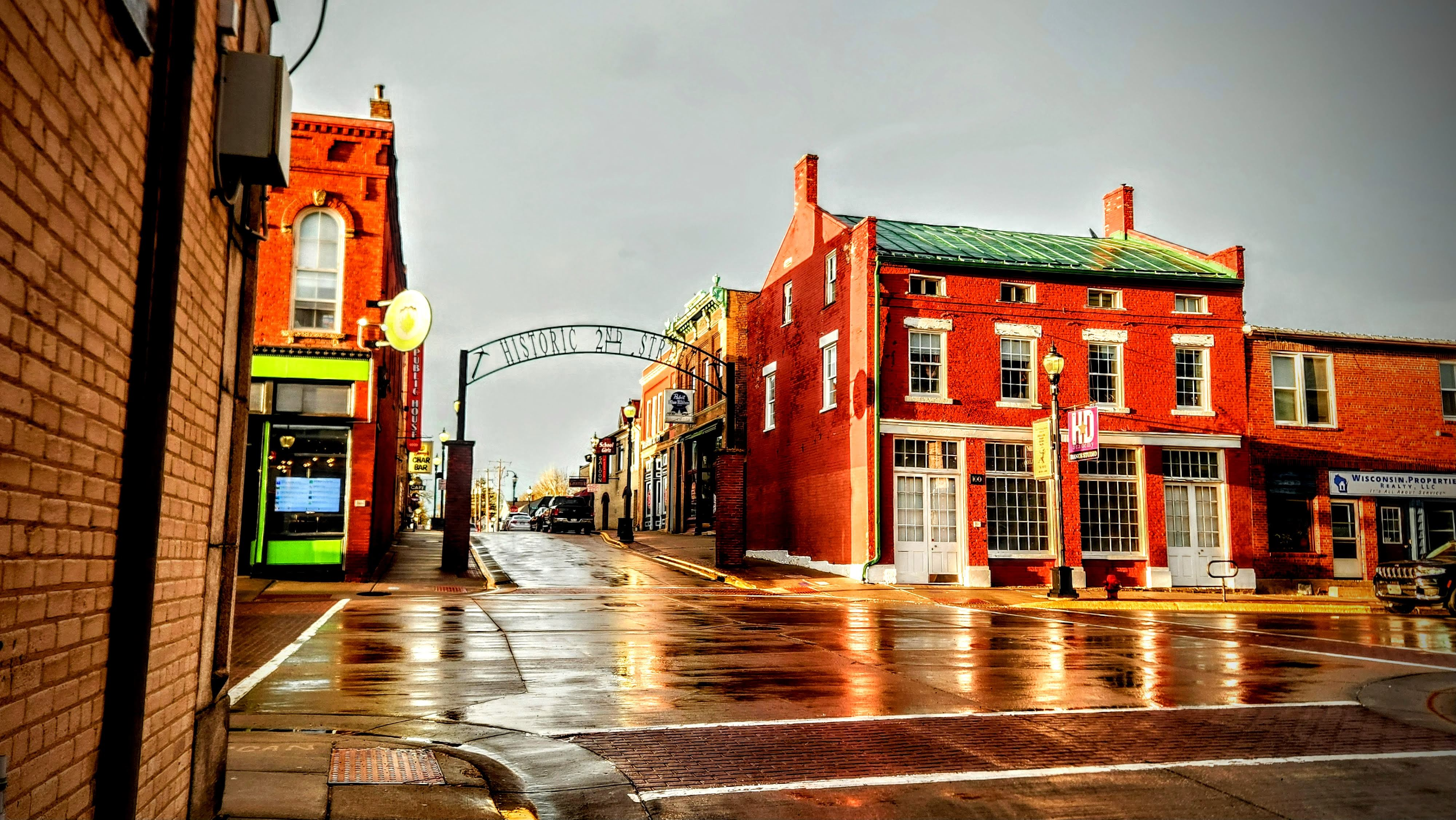
- Main Street Commercial Historic District City Hall Park Pine Street

- Location of Platteville in Grant County, Wisconsin.

- Location within Wisconsin Location within the United States
- Coordinates: 42°44′13.45″N 90°28′39.01″W
- Country: United States
- State: Wisconsin
- County: Grant
- Incorporated (village): 1841; 185 years ago
- Incorporated (city): March 4, 1880; 146 years ago

Government
  - City Manager: Caz Muske

Area
  - City: 6.18 sq mi (16.00 km^{2})
  - Land: 6.18 sq mi (16.00 km^{2})
  - Water: 0 sq mi (0.00 km^{2})
- Elevation: 991 ft (302 m)

Population (2020)
  - City: 11,836
  - Estimate (2021): 11,764
  - Density: 1,916/sq mi (739.7/km^{2})
  - Metro: 49,681
- Time zone: UTC-6 (CST)
  - Summer (DST): UTC-5 (CDT)
- ZIP code: 53818
- Area code: 608
- FIPS code: 55-63250
- Website: http://www.platteville.org/

Platteville is the largest city in Grant County, Wisconsin, United States. The population was 11,836 at the 2020 census. It is located atop the greater Platte River valley in the southern Driftless Region of Wisconsin, an area known for its karst topography and rolling hills. It is home to the University of Wisconsin–Platteville. It is the principal city of the Platteville micropolitan statistical area, which has an estimated population of 51,938.

== History ==
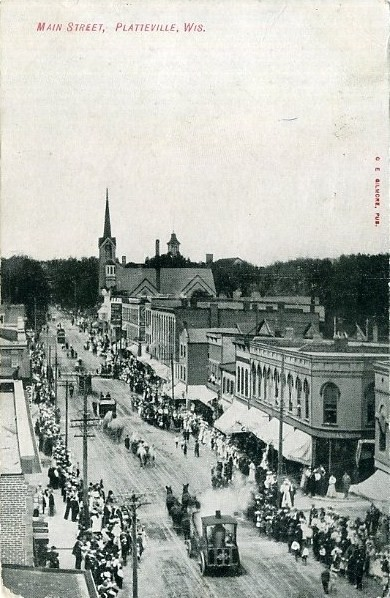
Main Street, 1910

Platteville was settled by pioneers and early lead miners; along inlets and flat groves of The Rountree Branch and Little Platte River. Part of the Platte River shed; these rivers flow into the greater Upper Mississippi River system. More specifically located in the Driftless Region of Southwestern Wisconsin. Due to its geographic location; areas of town are carved by ridges, narrow valleys, and steep hills. The influence of geography can also be seen in the irregularity of the streets in the community. As the town grew, roads were given odd routes, to avoid the steep ravines and mining shafts strewn about the locality.

Platteville was officially founded in 1829 by John H. Rountree, a southern businessman who had arrived in hopes of finding wealth during the area's lead rush. The town became a flourishing mining community in part due to its close proximity to Dubuque, Iowa, and Galena, Illinois. Both were thriving cities along the Mississippi River trade route that benefited from the rising demand for lead throughout the United States from the 1820s–1850s.

John H. Rountree and other wealthy southerners in the area, such as Wisconsin’s First Governor Henry Dodge; brought slaves with them during the lead rush. They also brought freed black laborers, with intentions for them to work the mines at a more affordable cost, often nothing. Although unpaid labor was illegal, it was practiced in the region until after the Civil War.

In 1850, a freed African-American man from Virginia, named Charles Shepard, settled a community known as Pleasant Ridge, Grant County, Wisconsin just west of Platteville. This served as a safe haven for many black people coming up the Mississippi River from Arkansas, Tennessee, Louisiana, etc. Some stayed and raised families but most continued on their way in hopes of finding success elsewhere.

By the 1860s lead ore production was decreasing. However, the mining of zinc ore quickly filled the void for prospective work. Platteville had become an established town, complete with schools, a private preparatory academy, newspaper, several churches, and a telegraph service as of November 1849.

During this time, both a teachers' college and a mining college were founded. The normal school was established on October 9, 1866 to train teachers for elementary school grades. The Wisconsin Mining Trade School opened in January 1908. In 1959, these two colleges were merged to become Wisconsin State College and Institute of Technology. Its curriculum was developed to add graduate programs and departments, particularly in engineering. In 1971 it was renamed as University of Wisconsin–Platteville, to reflect its expanded programs in graduate study. Other additions included criminal justice and, in the early 21st century, UW Platteville is also considered to have the best criminal justice college in the Midwest.

From 1984 until 2001 the Chicago Bears football team held summer training camp on the campus of University of Wisconsin–Platteville. Their program resulted in a substantial infusion of money into the local economy each summer. The town felt the decline after the Bears moved their training camp to Olivet Nazarene University in Illinois.

In 2004, U.S. Highway 151 was upgraded to a limited-access highway; it bypassed the city south of Platteville. Prior to the upgrade, the highway exits were closer to Platteville. The city made changes to adjust to the new southern US 151 bypass, and it has influenced subsequent development. A new hospital was built just north of US 151 and next to its off ramps. A Walmart Supercenter and a Menards have opened near the northern end of the US 151 bypass.

=== Historic places ===
- Bayley Avenue Historic District
- Beebe House
- Leonard and Caroline Coates House
- Edward and Mary Davies House
- Division Street Historic District
- Jonathan H. Evans House
- First Congregational Church
- German Evangelical Lutheran Church of Peace
- Main Street Commercial Historic District
- Mitchell-Rountree House
- Rock School and Hanmer Robbins School Complex
- Rountree Hall
- J. H. Rountree Mansion
- Trinity Episcopal Church
- Ullrich Hall
- West Main Street Historic District

== Geography ==
Platteville is located at 42°44′13″N 90°28′39″W (42.73707, −90.477501). It is in the Hollow Region, as named by early southern miners, in the rolling hills of southwestern Wisconsin.

According to the United States Census Bureau, the city has a total area of 6.18 square miles (16.01 km^{2}), all land.

Platteville is served by Wisconsin State Highways 80 and 81, as well as U.S. Highway 151.

The minerals in the area consist of galena, a sulfide of lead (lead 86.6, sulfur 13.4). Sphalerite or zinc sulfide is also, common in the region. Zinc and lead mining were in heavy production through the 1820s–1920s.

=== Climate ===
Climate data for Platteville, Wisconsin (1991–2020 normals, extremes 1872–present)
Month	Jan	Feb	Mar	Apr	May	Jun	Jul	Aug	Sep	Oct	Nov	Dec	Year
Record high °F (°C)	57 (14)	65 (18)	84 (29)	93 (34)	107 (42)	102 (39)	108 (42)	105 (41)	101 (38)	93 (34)	80 (27)	67 (19)	108 (42)
Mean daily maximum °F (°C)	25.7 (−3.5)	30.8 (−0.7)	43.3 (6.3)	57.1 (13.9)	68.7 (20.4)	78.2 (25.7)	81.8 (27.7)	80.1 (26.7)	73.2 (22.9)	60.3 (15.7)	44.6 (7.0)	31.6 (−0.2)	56.3 (13.5)
Daily mean °F (°C)	17.8 (−7.9)	22.3 (−5.4)	34.1 (1.2)	46.3 (7.9)	57.9 (14.4)	68.2 (20.1)	71.8 (22.1)	70.0 (21.1)	62.2 (16.8)	49.7 (9.8)	36.3 (2.4)	24.2 (−4.3)	46.7 (8.2)
Mean daily minimum °F (°C)	9.9 (−12.3)	13.7 (−10.2)	24.8 (−4.0)	35.4 (1.9)	47.1 (8.4)	58.3 (14.6)	61.8 (16.6)	59.8 (15.4)	51.2 (10.7)	39.1 (3.9)	28.0 (−2.2)	16.7 (−8.5)	37.1 (2.8)
Record low °F (°C)	−43 (−42)	−36 (−38)	−28 (−33)	7 (−14)	26 (−3)	33 (1)	44 (7)	35 (2)	24 (−4)	6 (−14)	−21 (−29)	−37 (−38)	−43 (−42)
Average precipitation inches (mm)	1.22 (31)	1.47 (37)	2.09 (53)	3.95 (100)	4.65 (118)	5.97 (152)	5.29 (134)	4.23 (107)	4.25 (108)	2.82 (72)	2.25 (57)	1.79 (45)	39.98 (1,015)
Average snowfall inches (cm)	11.0 (28)	9.8 (25)	6.1 (15)	1.6 (4.1)	0.1 (0.25)	0.0 (0.0)	0.0 (0.0)	0.0 (0.0)	0.0 (0.0)	0.4 (1.0)	1.9 (4.8)	11.9 (30)	42.8 (109)
Average precipitation days (≥ 0.01 in)	9.0	7.9	9.0	11.2	12.8	12.2	10.5	9.7	8.8	9.7	8.6	9.4	118.8
Average snowy days (≥ 0.1 in)	6.8	5.7	3.4	0.8	0.0	0.0	0.0	0.0	0.0	0.2	1.4	6.4	24.7
Source: NOAA

== Demographics ==
Historical population
Census	Pop.	Note	%±
1870	2,537		—
1880	2,687		5.9%
1890	2,740		2.0%
1900	3,340		21.9%
1910	4,452		33.3%
1920	4,353		−2.2%
1930	4,047		−7.0%
1940	4,762		17.7%
1950	5,751		20.8%
1960	6,957		21.0%
1970	9,599		38.0%
1980	9,580		−0.2%
1990	9,708		1.3%
2000	9,989		2.9%
2010	11,224		12.4%
2020	11,836		5.5%
2021 (est.)	11,764		−0.6%
U.S. Decennial Census

=== 2020 census ===
As of the 2020 census, Platteville had a population of 11,836. The population density was 1,915.8 inhabitants per square mile (739.7/km^{2}). The median age was 22.9 years. 13.5% of residents were under the age of 18 and 12.3% of residents were 65 years of age or older. For every 100 females there were 120.0 males, and for every 100 females age 18 and over there were 124.9 males age 18 and over.

99.7% of residents lived in urban areas, while 0.3% lived in rural areas. The 2020 census population of the city included 2,858 people in student housing.

There were 4,012 households in Platteville, of which 19.9% had children under the age of 18 living in them. Of all households, 32.1% were married-couple households, 27.5% were households with a male householder and no spouse or partner present, and 31.9% were households with a female householder and no spouse or partner present. About 36.1% of all households were made up of individuals and 11.5% had someone living alone who was 65 years of age or older.

There were 4,423 housing units at an average density of 715.9 per square mile (276.4/km^{2}), of which 9.3% were vacant. The homeowner vacancy rate was 1.5% and the rental vacancy rate was 9.4%.

Racial composition as of the 2020 census
Race	Number	Percent
White	10,756	90.9%
Black or African American	257	2.2%
American Indian and Alaska Native	29	0.2%
Asian	241	2.0%
Native Hawaiian and Other Pacific Islander	2	0.0%
Some other race	145	1.2%
Two or more races	406	3.4%
Hispanic or Latino (of any race)	371	3.1%

=== Socioeconomic characteristics ===
According to the American Community Survey estimates for 2016-2020, the median income for a household in the city was $42,626, and the median income for a family was $75,625. Male full-time workers had a median income of $43,303 versus $31,915 for female workers. The per capita income for the city was $20,781. About 7.5% of families and 30.0% of the population were below the poverty line, including 16.4% of those under age 18 and 13.8% of those age 65 or over. Of the population age 25 and over, 95.1% were high school graduates or higher and 41.8% had a bachelor's degree or higher.

=== 2010 census ===
As of the census of 2010, there were 11,224 people, 3,644 households, and 1,598 families residing in the city. The population density was 2,059.4 inhabitants per square mile (795.1/km^{2}). There were 3,840 housing units at an average density of 704.6 per square mile (272.0/km^{2}). The racial makeup of the city was 94.7% White, 2.1% African American, 0.2% Native American, 1.7% Asian, 0.3% from other races, and 1.0% from two or more races. Hispanic or Latino of any race were 1.6% of the population.

There were 3,644 households, of which 18.2% had children under the age of 18 living with them, 32.7% were married couples living together, 7.8% had a female householder with no husband present, 3.3% had a male householder with no wife present, and 56.1% were non-families. 31.4% of all households were made up of individuals, and 11.6% had someone living alone who was 65 years of age or older. The average household size was 2.32 and the average family size was 2.80.

The median age in the city was 22.4 years. 11.3% of residents were under the age of 18; 49.4% were between the ages of 18 and 24; 14.3% were from 25 to 44; 14.3% were from 45 to 64; and 10.7% were 65 years of age or older. The gender makeup of the city was 56.3% male and 43.7% female.

=== 2000 census ===
As of the census of 2000, there were 9,989 people, 3,312 households, and 1,692 families residing in the city. The population density was 2,376.4 people per square mile (918.3/km^{2}). There were 3,482 housing units at an average density of 828.4 per square mile (320.1/km^{2}). The racial makeup of the city was 96.15% White, 1.12% Black or African American, 0.27% Native American, 1.40% Asian, 0.04% Pacific Islander, 0.27% from other races, and 0.75% from two or more races. 0.88% of the population were Hispanic or Latino of any race. There were 3,312 households, out of which 22.2% had children under the age of 18 living with them, 40.0% were married couples living together, 8.0% had a female householder with no husband present, and 48.9% were non-families. 32.2% of all households were made up of individuals, and 13.0% had someone living alone who was 65 years of age or older. The average household size was 2.31 and the average family size was 2.86.

In the city, the population was spread out, with 14.4% under the age of 18, 41.3% from 18 to 24, 17.5% from 25 to 44, 14.4% from 45 to 64, and 12.3% who were 65 years of age or older. The median age was 23 years. For every 100 females, there were 119.3 males. For every 100 females age 18 and over, there were 120.6 males.

The median income for a household in the city was $35,742, and the median income for a family was $50,583. Males had a median income of $31,424 versus $21,896 for females. The per capita income for the city was $15,858. About 4.6% of families and 19.4% of the population were below the poverty line, including 12.2% of those under age 18 and 8.3% of those age 65 or over.

== Arts and culture ==
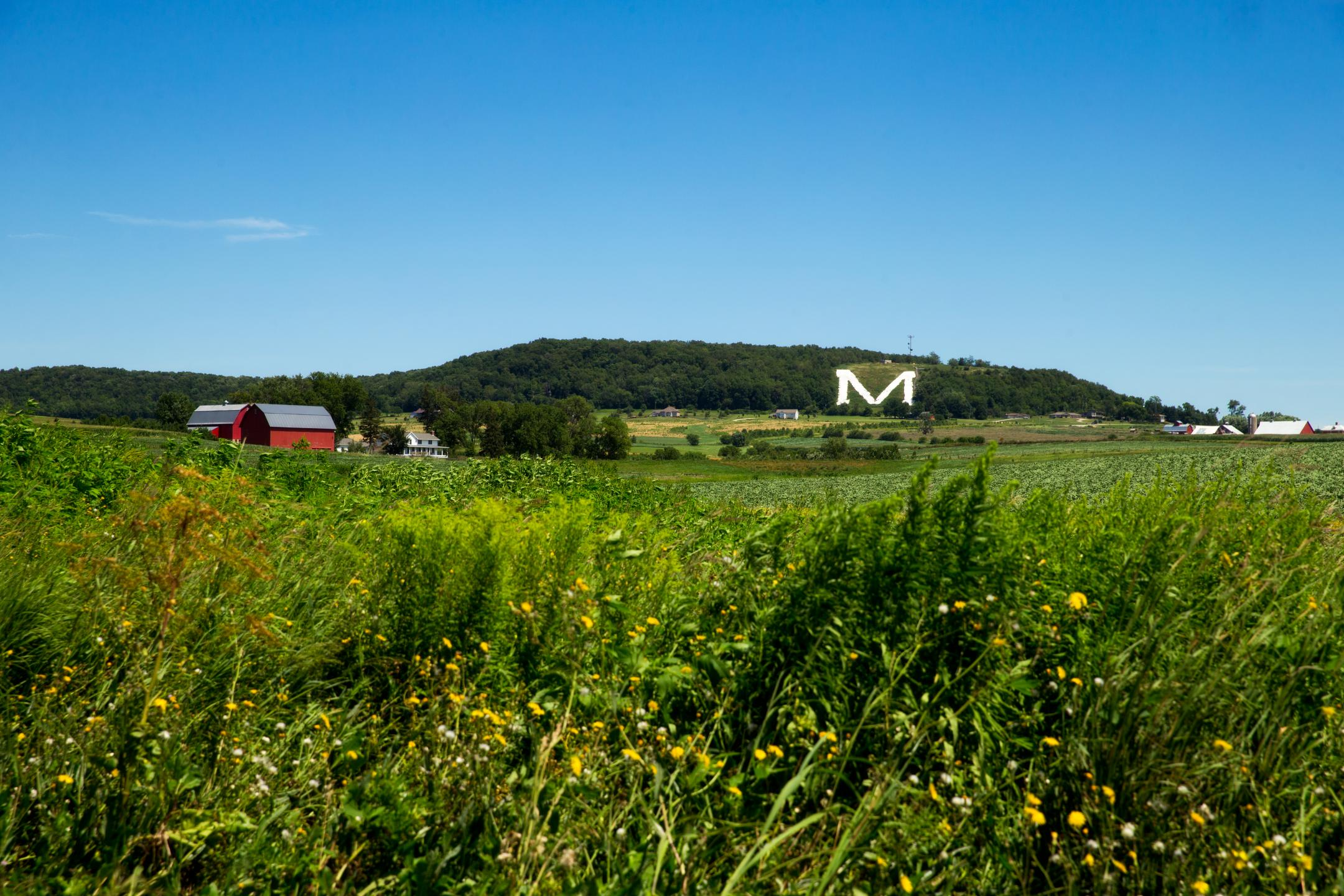
Giant M on the Platte Mound

The Mining and Rollo Jamison Museums examines Platteville's mining history.

Built in 1837 by Reverend Samuel Mitchell, the Stone Cottage still contains many of the original furnishings. The home was a home of the Major John Rountree, one of Platteville's founders. The walls are two feet thick and made of dolomite Galena limestone.

The Platte Mound M is the letter "M" written using whitewashed stones on Platte Mound about four miles east of downtown Platteville. It is the largest hillside letter "M" in the world. The letter is 241 feet (73 m) high, 214 feet (65 m) wide, with legs 25 feet (7.6 m) wide.

== Education ==
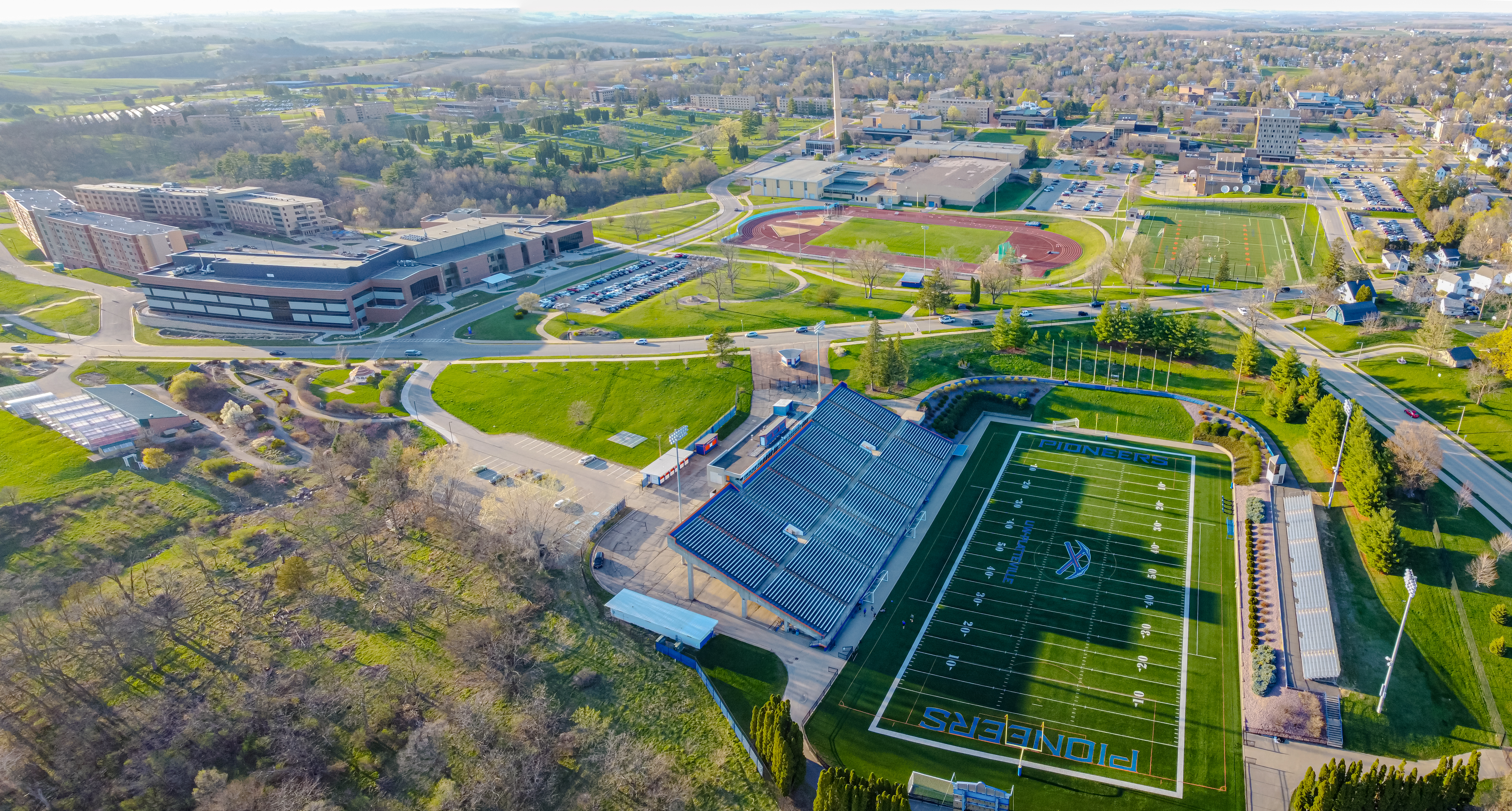
UW-Platteville campus

The Platteville School District serves the Platteville area. Platteville High School is the area's public high school. Platteville High School's mascot is "Henry Hillmen". The University of Wisconsin–Platteville is located in Platteville.

== Transportation ==
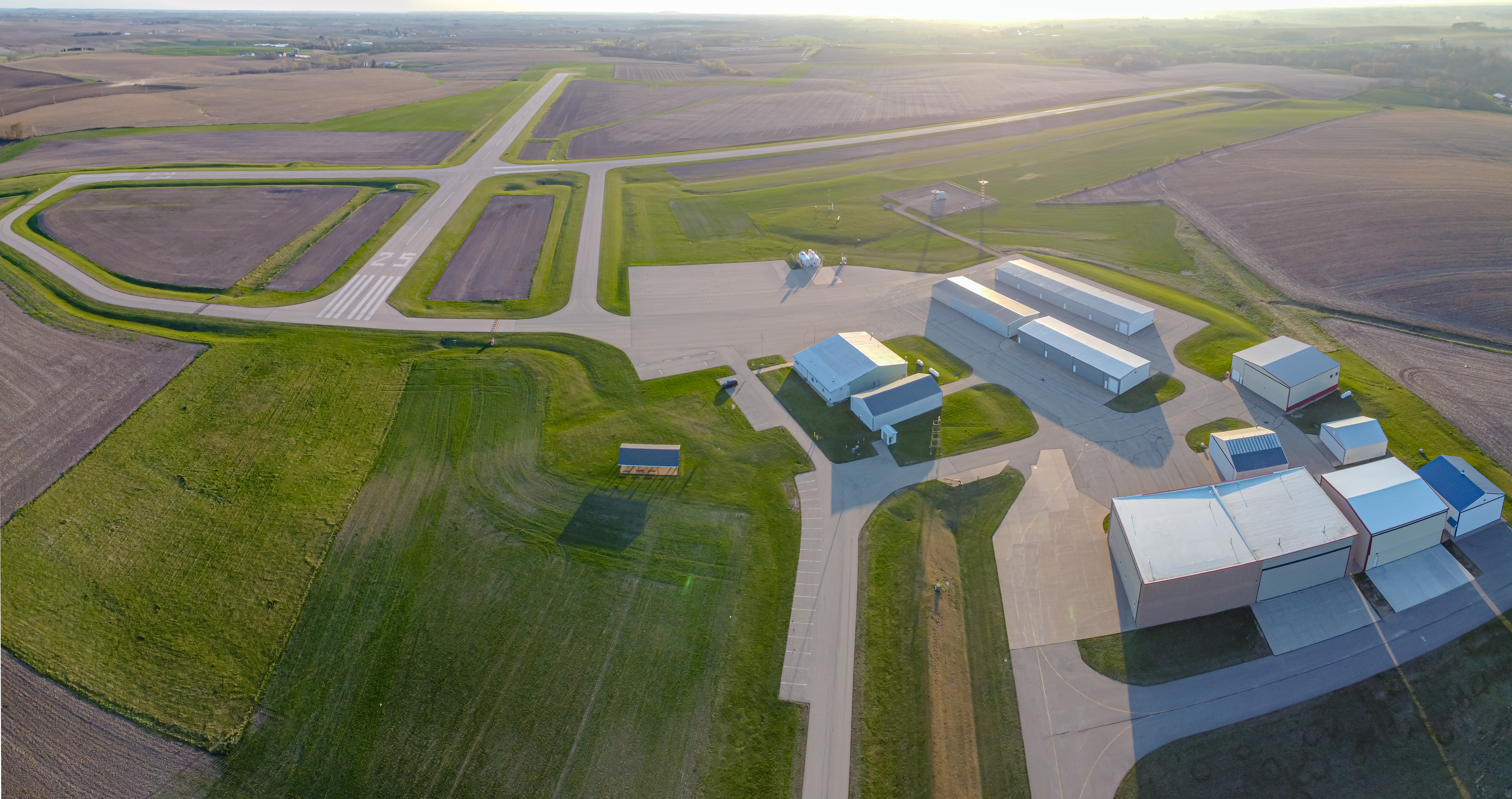
Platteville Municipal Airport

Aside from Platteville Municipal Airport (KPVB), which serves the city and surrounding communities for general aviation, Platteville has minimal commercial air access. The closest airport with any regularly scheduled commercial service is Dubuque Regional Airport, and the closest airport with regularly scheduled commercial international flights is Chicago O'Hare International Airport.

Platteville's primary road access is via U.S. Route 151, which acts as an expressway for the region; US 151 has three exits near the city center. Wisconsin state routes 80 and 81 also serve Platteville, cutting through the central business district as sort of a "main street".

Platteville Public Transportation provides the community with bus service and paratransit service.

Platteville no longer has railroad service. It was previously served by the Chicago and Northwestern Railway (C&NW) via an 8-mile branch off the Montfort Junction to Galena line at Ipswich. The line entered Platteville from the east-southeast and curved around to the north. The line then joined the Milwaukee Road. This in effect created a large 180° curve in the southeastern part of Platteville where the mines, depots and other rail-dependent industries were located. The Milwaukee Road branch continued on to the ENE then east for 17 miles where it branched off another Milwaukee Road branch line to Mineral Point at the town of Calamine. Passenger service ended on the C&NW in 1951 and was replaced by mixed train service on the Milwaukee Road in 1952. Freight service continued on the Milwaukee Road until 1974 when the line was abandoned and pulled up. It left the C&NW moving only a few cars per week which applied to abandon the route. The abandonment was granted in 1980 and the line was pulled up forever ending railroad service to Platteville.

== Notable people ==
=== Politicians ===
- William Carter, Wisconsin State Representative
- S. Wesley Clark, Attorney General of South Dakota
- Kearton Coates, Wisconsin State Representative
- Thomas Cruson, Wisconsin Territorial legislator
- James Dolan, Wisconsin State Representative
- Ensign Dickinson, Wisconsin State Representative
- Charles E. Estabrook, Wisconsin Attorney General
- Neely Gray, Wisconsin territorial legislator and businessman
- John L. Grindell, Wisconsin State Representative
- Jon R. Guiles, Wisconsin State Representative
- James V. Holland, Wisconsin State Representative
- Thomas Jenkins, Wisconsin State Representative
- Arthur W. Kopp, U.S. Representative
- James B. McCoy, Wisconsin State Representative
- Duncan McGregor, Wisconsin State Representative
- Ray Meiklejohn, Canadian politician
- Christopher C. Miller, Acting United States Secretary of Defense
- Jonathan Baker Moore, Wisconsin State Representative and Union Army general
- James William Murphy, U.S. Representative
- Edward Rawlings, Iowa State Representative
- Hanmer Robbins, Wisconsin State Representative
- Gordon Roseleip, Wisconsin State Senator
- John H. Rountree, Wisconsin State Senator
- A. C. Schultz, Wisconsin State Representative
- George Slack, Wisconsin State Representative
- Harry E. Stephens, Wisconsin State Representative
- Robert S. Travis, Wisconsin State Senator
- Adelbert L. Utt, Wisconsin State Representative
- James Russell Vineyard, Wisconsin and California politician
- Noah Virgin, Wisconsin State Senator
- Benjamin Webster, Wisconsin State Representative
- Conrad J. Weittenhiller, Wisconsin State Representative

=== Others ===
- Scott Adams, early computer game publisher and designer
- John Fiedler, voice actor and character actor in stage, film, television and radio
- Herbert Spencer Gasser, physiologist and recipient of the Nobel Prize for Physiology or Medicine in 1944
- Geoff Herbach, novelist
- Cosette Kies, librarian, writer, ad academic
- Herbert T. Perrin, U.S. Brigadier General and Distinguished Service Cross recipient
- Josiah Little Pickard, educator
- Pants Rowland, manager of 1917 World Series champion Chicago White Sox

== See also ==
- Platteville Municipal Airport
- Dick's Supermarket
