= Paris, Grant County, Wisconsin =

Paris, Wisconsin
- Town
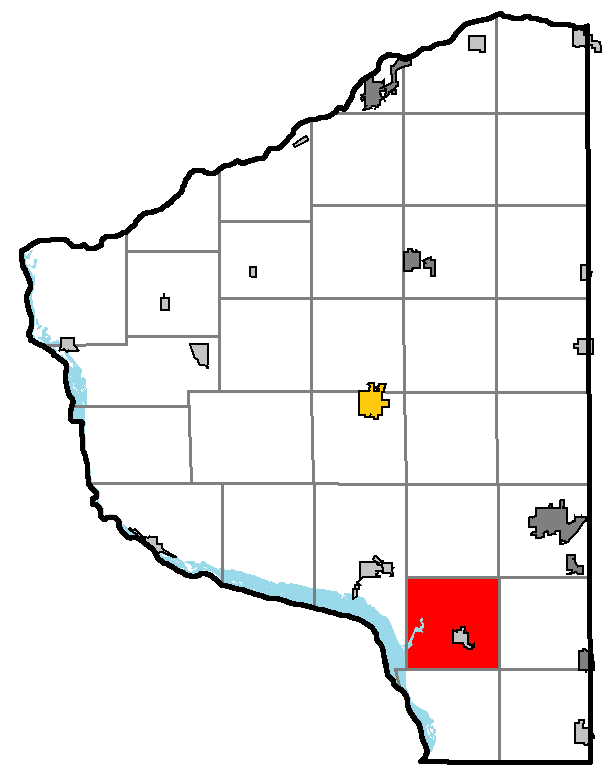
- Location of Paris within Grant County, Wisconsin

- Location of Grant County, Wisconsin
- Coordinates: 42°39′1″N 90°36′37″W
- Country: United States
- State: Wisconsin
- County: Grant

Area
  - Total: 35.5 sq mi (92.0 km^{2})
  - Land: 35.1 sq mi (91.0 km^{2})
  - Water: 0.42 sq mi (1.1 km^{2})
- Elevation: 912 ft (278 m)

Population (2020)
  - Total: 655
  - Density: 18.6/sq mi (7.20/km^{2})
- Time zone: UTC-6 (Central (CST))
  - Summer (DST): UTC-5 (CDT)
- Area code: 608
- FIPS code: 55-61150
- GNIS feature ID: 1583893

Paris is a town in Grant County, Wisconsin, United States. The population was 655 at the 2020 census. The village of Dickeyville is surrounded by the town's boundaries.

== Geography ==
According to the United States Census Bureau, the town has a total area of 35.5 square miles (92.0 km^{2}), of which 35.1 square miles (91.0 km^{2}) is land and 0.4 square mile (1.1 km^{2}) (1.15%) is water.

== Demographics ==
At the 2000 census there were 754 people, 264 households, and 210 families living in the town. The population density was 21.5 people per square mile (8.3/km^{2}). There were 278 housing units at an average density of 7.9 per square mile (3.1/km^{2}). The racial makeup of the town was 99.73% White, 0.13% African American and 0.13% Asian. Hispanic or Latino of any race were 0.27%.

Of the 264 households 40.5% had children under the age of 18 living with them, 69.3% were married couples living together, 5.3% had a female householder with no husband present, and 20.1% were non-families. 15.2% of households were one person and 4.9% were one person aged 65 or older. The average household size was 2.84 and the average family size was 3.19.

The age distribution was 29.0% under the age of 18, 6.5% from 18 to 24, 29.2% from 25 to 44, 27.2% from 45 to 64, and 8.1% 65 or older. The median age was 36 years. For every 100 females, there were 107.1 males. For every 100 females age 18 and over, there were 109.0 males.

The median household income was $41,111 and the median family income was $46,250. Males had a median income of $35,000 versus $18,542 for females. The per capita income for the town was $19,199. About 7.1% of families and 10.9% of the population were below the poverty line, including 18.3% of those under age 18 and 6.1% of those age 65 or over.
