= Wisconsin's Grant County 3rd Assembly district =

Former American legislative district

Wisconsin's Grant County 3rd State Assembly district
- Obsolete
- Notes: 1848–1892

Wisconsin's Grant County 3rd Assembly district was a district in the Wisconsin State Assembly for several years in the early history of the state of Wisconsin, prior to the legislative redistricting reforms of 1972 which created the current numbered districts. Located in southwest Wisconsin, the district was one of the 66 original Assembly districts defined in Article XIV of the Constitution of Wisconsin. The Constitution originally allocated four districts for Grant County, Wisconsin; the 3rd district originally comprised south-central Grant County.

The district was in use for the first 44 years of Wisconsin's history, from 1848 to 1892.

== List of representatives ==
List of representatives from the Grant County 3rd district
Member	Party	Residence	Term start	Term end	Leg.
District created
Armisted C. Brown	Whig	Potosi	June 5, 1848	January 1, 1849	1st
Davis Gillilan	Dem.	Potosi	January 1, 1849	January 7, 1850	2nd
Jeremiah Dodge	Dem.	Lancaster	January 7, 1850	January 6, 1851	3rd
William Biddlecome	Dem.	Potosi	January 6, 1851	January 5, 1852	4th
David McKee	Dem.	Potosi	January 5, 1852	January 3, 1853	5th
Titus Hayes	Whig	Platteville	January 3, 1853	January 2, 1854	6th
Edward Estabrook	Whig	Platteville	January 2, 1854	January 1, 1855	7th
Noah Virgin	Rep.	Beetown	January 1, 1855	January 7, 1856	8th
James T. Brown	Rep.	Clifton	January 7, 1856	January 5, 1857	9th
Hanmer Robbins	Rep.	Platteville	January 5, 1857	January 3, 1859	10th 11th
Jesse Waldorf	Rep.	Platteville	January 3, 1859	January 2, 1860	12th
Jonathan Baker Moore	Rep.	Muscoda	January 2, 1860	January 7, 1861	13th
Hanmer Robbins	Rep.	Platteville	January 7, 1861	January 6, 1862	14th
Joseph Trotter Mills	Rep.	Lancaster	January 6, 1862	January 1, 1863	15th
J. Allen Barber	Rep.	Lancaster	January 1, 1863	January 2, 1865	16th 17th
Henry Utt	Union	Platteville	January 2, 1865	January 1, 1866	18th
Alanson Hammond	Union	Montfort	January 1, 1866	January 7, 1867	19th
Joseph Allen	Union	Clifton	January 7, 1867	January 6, 1868	20th
Jeremiah Dodge	Rep.	Lancaster	January 6, 1868	January 4, 1869	21st
William P. Dewey	Rep.	Lancaster	January 4, 1869	January 2, 1871	22nd 23rd
John Chandler Holloway	Rep.	Lancaster	January 2, 1871	January 1, 1872	24th
Samuel Abbott Ferrin	Rep.	Wingville	January 1, 1872	January 6, 1873	25th
John Monteith	Rep.	Fennimore	January 6, 1873	January 5, 1874	26th
Gottlieb Wehrle	Lib.R.	Fennimore	January 5, 1874	January 4, 1875	27th
Benjamin M. Coates	Rep.	Boscobel	January 4, 1875	January 3, 1876	28th
George Brown	Rep.	Woodman	January 3, 1876	January 1, 1877	29th
Daniel Robbins Sylvester	Rep.	Castle Rock	January 1, 1877	January 7, 1878	30th
Thomas Jefferson Graham	Dem.	Muscoda	January 7, 1878	January 6, 1879	31st
John Brindley	Rep.	Boscobel	January 6, 1879	January 3, 1881	32nd 33rd
Edward I. Kidd	Rep.	Millville	January 3, 1881	January 5, 1885	34th 35th 36th
Rufus M. Day	Rep.	Mount Hope	January 5, 1885	January 7, 1889	37th 38th
A. C. V. Elston	Rep.	Muscoda	January 7, 1889	January 5, 1891	39th
Christopher Hinn	Dem.	Fennimore	January 5, 1891	January 2, 1893	40th
District abolished by 1892 Wisconsin Special Session 2 Act 1 Grant County was consolidated into the Grant 1st and Grant 2nd Assembly districts
