= Wehrle =

Wehrle may refer to:

== People ==
- Ann E. Wehrle (born 1956), American astronomer
- Emilian Wehrle (1832–1896), German clockmaker
- Gottlieb Wehrle (1822–1886), American farmer and politician
- Hermann Josef Wehrle (1899–1944), German resistance member
- John O. Wehrle (born 1941), American artist
- Martin Wehrle (born 1970), German journalist and author
- Paul Wehrle (1921–2004), American medical researcher
- R. W. Wehrle, American naturalist
- Timo Wehrle (born 1996), German footballer
- Vincent de Paul Wehrle OSB (born 1855), Catholic bishop

== Other uses ==
- A character in the 1954 West German Film Annie from Tharau
- Wehrle's salamander, a species of salamander endemic to the Eastern United States

== See also ==
- Gautier–Wehrlé, a former French manufacturer of vehicles
- Wehrli, a surname
- Wehrlite, an ultramafic rock
- Werle, a fiefdom in the Holy Roman Empire
- Werley, Wisconsin, United States
