= Platteville Subdivision =

Former railway line in Illinois and Wisconsin

History
- Opened: 1874
- Closed: 1980

Technical
- Track gauge: 1,435 mm (4 ft 8 1/2 in) standard gauge
- Old gauge: 3 ft (914 mm)

The Platteville Subdivision, also known as the Galena branch, was a railway line in the states of Illinois and Wisconsin. It ran approximately 46 miles (74 km) from Galena, Illinois, to Montfort, Wisconsin, with a 4-mile (6.4 km) branch from Ipswich, Wisconsin, to Platteville, Wisconsin. The line was initially built by the Galena and Southern Wisconsin Railroad as a 3 ft (914 mm) line; it was subsequently rebuilt as a 1,435 mm (4 ft 8 1/2 in) standard gauge line. The line opened in 1874 and was fully abandoned in 1980.

== History ==
The Galena and Southern Wisconsin Railroad began construction of a 3 ft (914 mm) line in 1874 and opened it between Galena, Illinois, and Platteville, Wisconsin, on January 1, 1875. Also serving Platteville was the Dubuque, Platteville and Milwaukee Railroad (a forerunner of the Milwaukee Road), which had opened in 1870.

The company extended the line further north in the direction of Montfort, Wisconsin, in 1877. (Note: This location is variously described as "McCormick's", "Conley", or "south of Rewey.) The line branched off the original line at Ipswich, Wisconsin, 4 miles (6.4 km) east of Platteville. (Note: Ipswich is also called Phillips Corners or Platteville Junction.) The Galena and Southern Wisconsin Railroad failed in 1879 and was reorganized as the Galena and Wisconsin Railroad, which was unable to complete the line to Montfort.

Under the auspices of the Chicago and North Western Railway, the Chicago and Tomah Railroad, another narrow gauge railroad, built east from Fennimore, Wisconsin, through Montfort and south to the northern end of the Galena and Wisconsin Railroad's line. This connection was completed in 1880. The line between Galena and Fennimore was converted to 1,435 mm (4 ft 8 1/2 in) standard gauge in 1882.

The Galena and Wisconsin Railroad and Chicago and Tomah Railroad were consolidated in 1880 as the Milwaukee and Madison Railway. In 1881, this company, along with the Sheboygan and Western Railway and the Chicago and Milwaukee Railway, was consolidated as the Chicago, Milwaukee and North Western Railway. That company was bought in 1883 by the Chicago and North Western Railway. The Chicago and North Western constructed a 2.7-mile (4.3 km) spur to Hazel Green, Wisconsin, in 1907.

Amid bankruptcy reorganization, the Chicago and North Western began abandoning the line in 1939, starting with the section between Galena and Hazel Green Junction in 1939. In 1940, the line was further cut back to Strawbridge, Wisconsin, and the branch line to Hazel Green, Wisconsin, was abandoned entirely. The line was further cut back to Benton, Wisconsin, in 1941. In 1967 it was cut back to Cuba City, Wisconsin, and then abandoned altogether in 1980.
