= Galena and Southern Wisconsin Railroad =

Overview
- Dates of operation: 1853–1879
- Successor: Chicago and Tomah Railroad

Technical
- Track gauge: 3 ft (914 mm)
- Length: 40 miles (64 km)

The Galena and Southern Wisconsin Railroad Company was a railroad company in the United States. It constructed and operated a narrow gauge line between Galena, Illinois, and near Rewey, Wisconsin, via Platteville, Wisconsin. The railroad went through multiple reorganizations in the early 1880s before becoming part of the Chicago and North Western Railway system. The line was unified with that of the Chicago and Tomah Railroad and rebuilt as a 4 ft 8 1/2 in (1,435 mm) line. As the Platteville Subdivision of the Chicago and North Western, it was eventually abandoned in 1980.

== History ==
The Galena and Southern Wisconsin Railroad was incorporated on January 26, 1853, in Illinois, and on March 2, 1857, in Wisconsin. After obtaining financing, construction work began in 1872 on a 3 ft (914 mm) line. The line was completely open between Galena, Illinois, and Platteville, Wisconsin, on January 1, 1875. Also serving Platteville was the Dubuque, Platteville and Milwaukee Railroad (a forerunner of the Milwaukee Road), which had opened in 1870. In 1877, the company extended its line further north toward–but short of–Montfort, Wisconsin. The line branched from the original line at Ipswich, Wisconsin, four miles east of Platteville.

In 1879 the company was reorganized as the Galena and Wisconsin Railroad. Separate companies of that name were incorporated in Illinois and Wisconsin, each owning the property of the original company in those respective states. The two companies were then consolidated into a single company, again with the same name. The Galena and Wisconsin Railroad undertook no new construction before being consolidated with the Chicago and Tomah Railroad on August 31, 1880.

== Line ==
The company's lines eventually became of the Chicago and North Western Railway's Platteville Subdivision (also known as the Galena branch). The connection with the Chicago and Tomah Railroad at Montfort was realized in 1880. The entirely of the former Galena and Southern Wisconsin Railroad line was converted to standard gauge in 1882. The last remnant of the line was abandoned in 1980.

== Rolling Stock ==
=== The Platteville (No. 1) ===
As for the railroad itself, a Galena Gazette story dated April 9, 1874 indicates that the first of two engines was delivered. It was named the Platteville and numbered as No.1. The description tells that the Platteville had 35,000 W.W.O., 6 drivers (drive wheels) each 3 feet (0.91 m) in diameter, and one pony truck in front. This makes it a Mogul-type engine, with a 2-6-0 configuration. Furthermore, the Platteville had 11-by-16-inch (280 by 410 mm) cylinders and tender water tank capacity of 1,100 US gallons (4,200 L). The tender had a pair of four-wheeled trucks. The Platteville was estimated to be able to pull 800 tons on a level grade, and at 75 feet per mile (1.42%), to draw 100 tons.

The Platteville 3 ft (914 mm) gauge locomotive was manufactured in Connellsville, Pennsylvania, at the National Locomotive Works. It cost $7,000 and would be used in the extension and construction of the line to Platteville, Wisconsin, which would eventually be completed on 1 January 1875. The article also mentions a second locomotive, The Galena, which would be delivered sometime in September 1874.

One interesting story from 6 November 1874 mentions an accident that involved the Platteville locomotive. "Mr. Geo W. Mortimer from the Steam Engine Works at Connellsville, Pa. where the Platteville was made" was slightly injured in a minor steam escape as he was overhauling the boiler.

=== The Galena (No. 2) ===
Unlike The Platteville locomotive, The Galena was a 4-4-0 American-type engine. The Galena had 44-inch (1.1 m) drivers and a similar tender to that of the Platteville but which could hold 1,000 US gallons (3,800 L) of water, (100 less than the Platteville's tender) yet still more than enough for the 31 mile trip along the full length of the line, and the locomotive is reported to have had similar traction power to No. 1.

=== Other Rolling Stock ===
The rolling stock of the G&SWRR came mostly from the Litchfield Car Works, originally in Litchfield, Illinois. In 1889 this company moved to Mount Vernon, Illinois and changed its name to the Mount Vernon Car Company. The company had earlier built rolling stock for several railroads, such as the Gulf, California and Santa Fe Railway

The Galena Gazette article of 27 November 1874 mentions a passenger car costing $1,500 being the first such added to the line. By this time the line reached well into Wisconsin, as far up as Cuba City, Wisconsin, and passenger service was vital to the operation of the G&SWRR. The passenger car was reported as 40 feet (12 m) long, with 10 feet (3.0 m) of its length dedicated to baggage, express & post office use, whilst the other 30 feet (9.1 m) had a 28-seat passenger compartment. There was a report of a minor incident involving the passenger coach, whereby it left the tracks near the tunnel close to Buncombe P.O. and sustained a few scratches, but was quickly returned to service.

A "comfortable caboose" was also added for freight service. Most of the freight service seems to have been mainly livestock, although Wisconsin cheese and dairy as well as lead and zinc mined in the region would have been an important source of income. There are also mentions in the Galena Gazette of "hay, flour, and other goods" being transported along the line. With connections to the Illinois Central in Galena, local goods reached Chicago and beyond. In later years, goods and passengers could ride from Platteville and Ipswich, Wisconsin, (located southeast of Platteville), all the way to Milwaukee, Wisconsin.

Before the G&SWRR ceased to exist independently, General and President Grant and his wife rode the train from Galena to Platteville, as described in a Galena Gazette article.

During the late 1870s, the railroad began losing revenue as flooding and snow storms were regularly stopping all traffic along the line.

== The route today ==
In 1878 the narrow gauge mainline stations in Illinois were Galena and Millbrig on the Galena River. Wisconsin stations were Buncombe, Benton, Cuba City, St. Rose, St. Elmo and Platteville. An 1877 extension ran from Phillips′ Corner, east of Platteville, to McCormick′s Corners via Grand View (Belmont).

The old right-of-way, now abandoned, can still be seen in some places, tracing what was once a small but prosperous locally owned and operated railroad empire stretching between Galena, Illinois, and Platteville as well as Montfort, Wisconsin. The fate of the Platteville was reported by the Galena Gazette to have been sent to the C&NW Proviso yards after it sustained damage due to wear and tear, but the Galena locomotive's fate is unknown.

The track ran through Millbrig, also called Bell′s Station, by the 1862 stone grist mill that served as post office and depot. William Bell was the miller and postmaster. The mill has been restored and converted into a barn located at Millbrig Hollow on West Council Hill Road.

There is a short tunnel, still intact, near where the old Buncombe depot once stood. It was built and used by the G&SWRR, also the site of a spur leading uphill northwest to small station near Hazel Green, Wisconsin.

Only a few of the structures that served as stations and depots for the G&SWRR exist today. Some bridge abutments can still be found where the roadbed snaked along and across the Galena River (Illinois) (also known as the Fevre River). In Cuba City a caboose and a few items from the C&NW days are on display.

The Rountree Branch Trail in Platteville follows some of the right-of-way. There are several concrete bridge abutments near the trail.

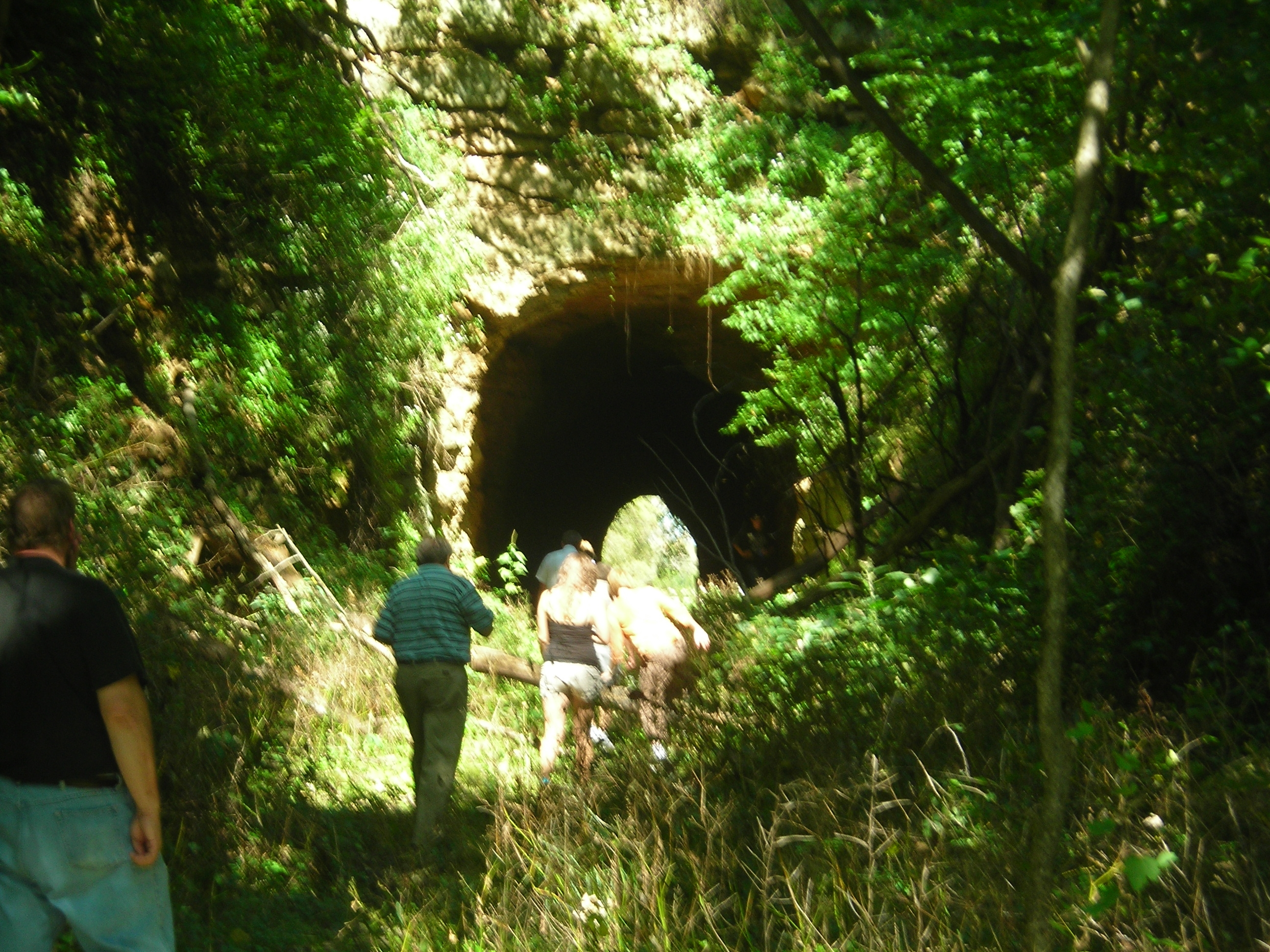
The Buncombe Tunnel as it exists today.

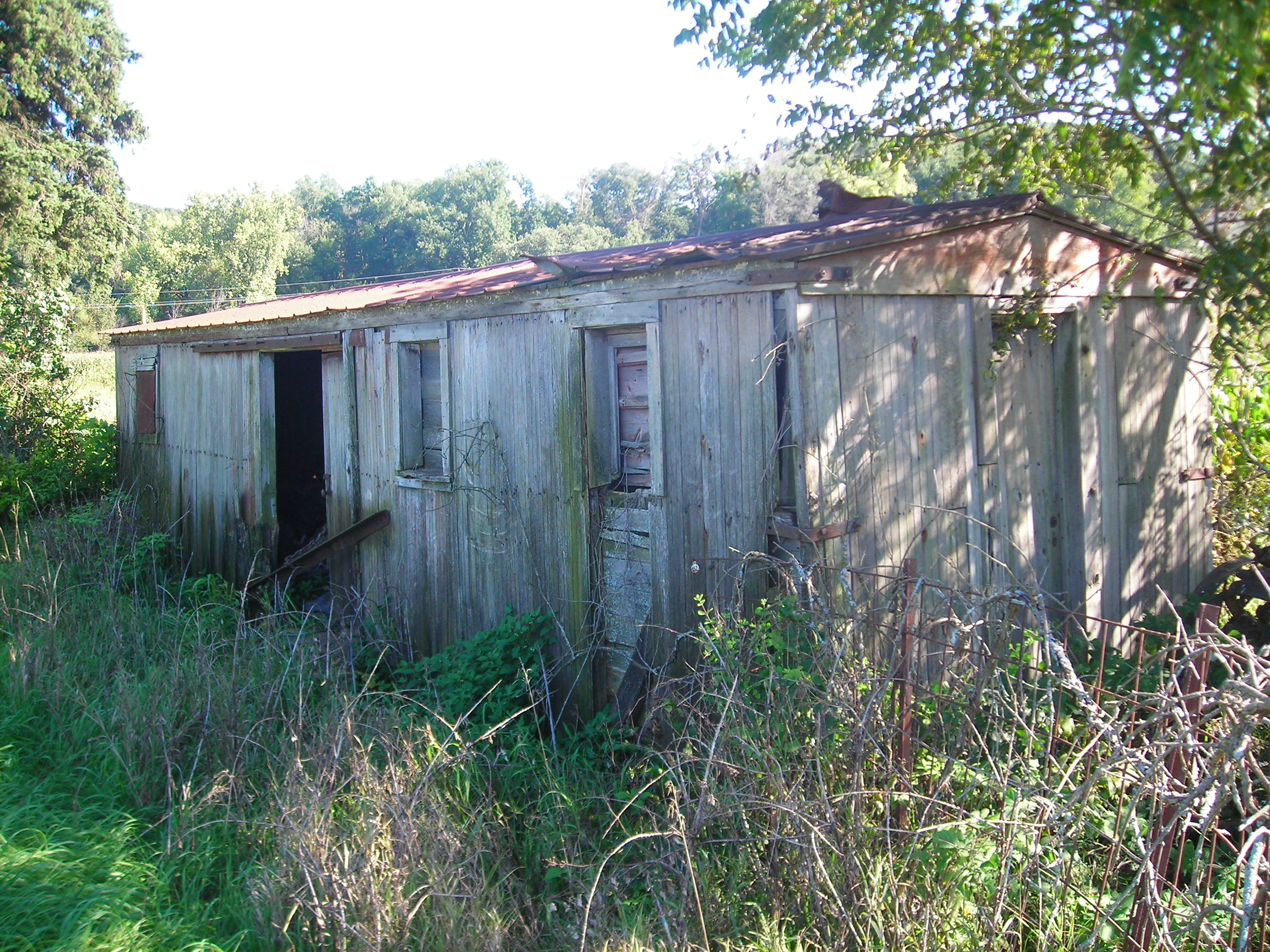
Once a rail car, now a storage shed.

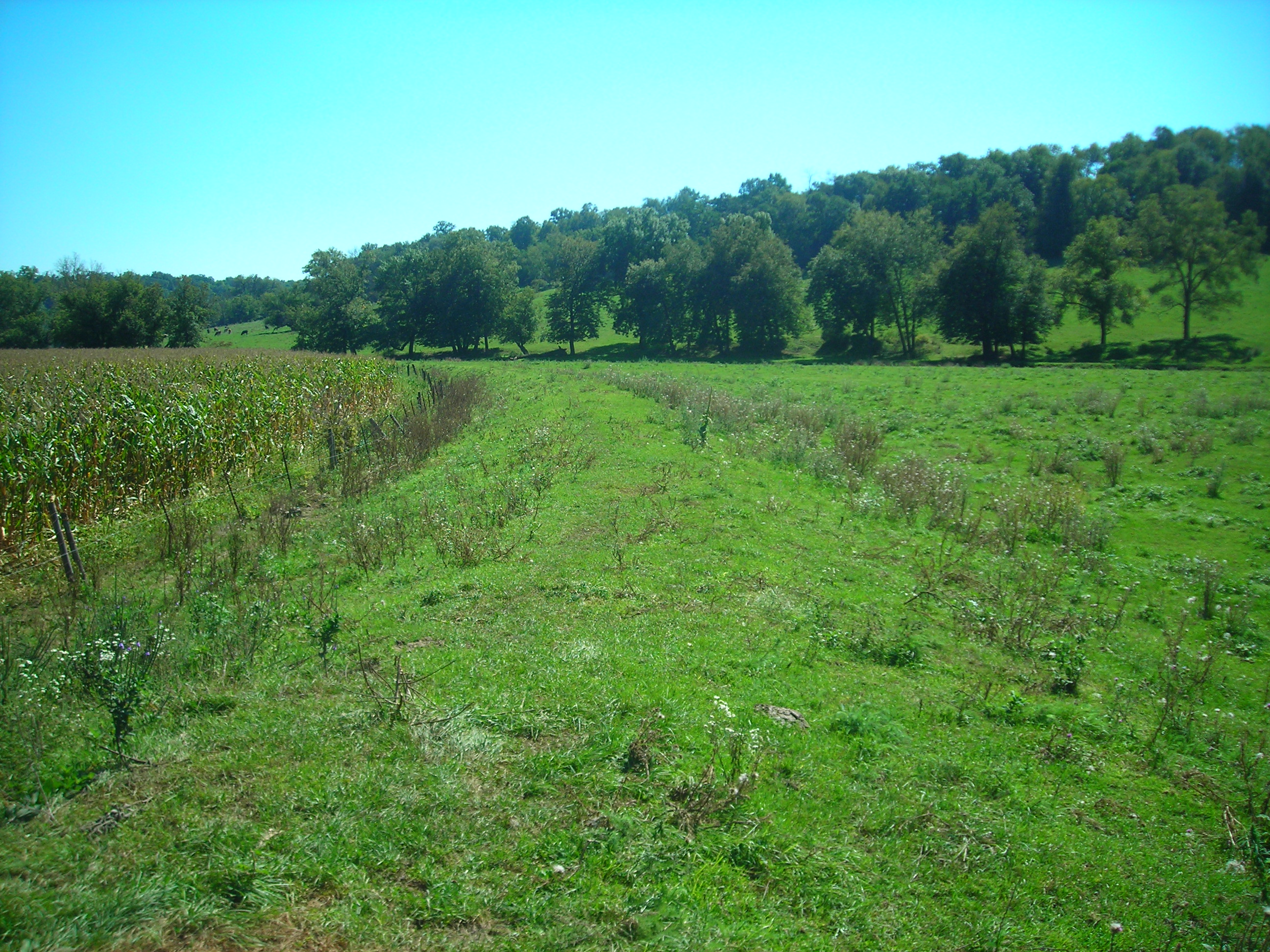
Some of the old roadbed near the Buncombe Tunnel.
