= Chicago and Tomah Railroad =

US railroad company

- The Chicago and Tomah Railroad in 1880; the lines of the Galena and Southern Wisconsin Railroad are not shown.

Overview
- Dates of operation: 1872–1880
- Successor: Milwaukee and Madison Railway

Technical
- Track gauge: 3 ft (914 mm)
- Length: 92.88 miles (149.48 km)

The Chicago and Tomah Railroad was a railroad company in the United States. It was incorporated in 1872 and was intended to connect the northern forests of Wisconsin around Tomah with Freeport and Chicago, Illinois. The company constructed a 3 ft (914 mm) narrow gauge line between Woodman and Montfort, Wisconsin, with a branch to Lancaster. The company came under Chicago and North Western Railway control in 1880, which built a connection with the narrow gauge Galena and Wisconsin Railroad. Both were consolidated into the Milwaukee and Madison Railway. None of the Chicago and Tomah's network exists today.

== History ==
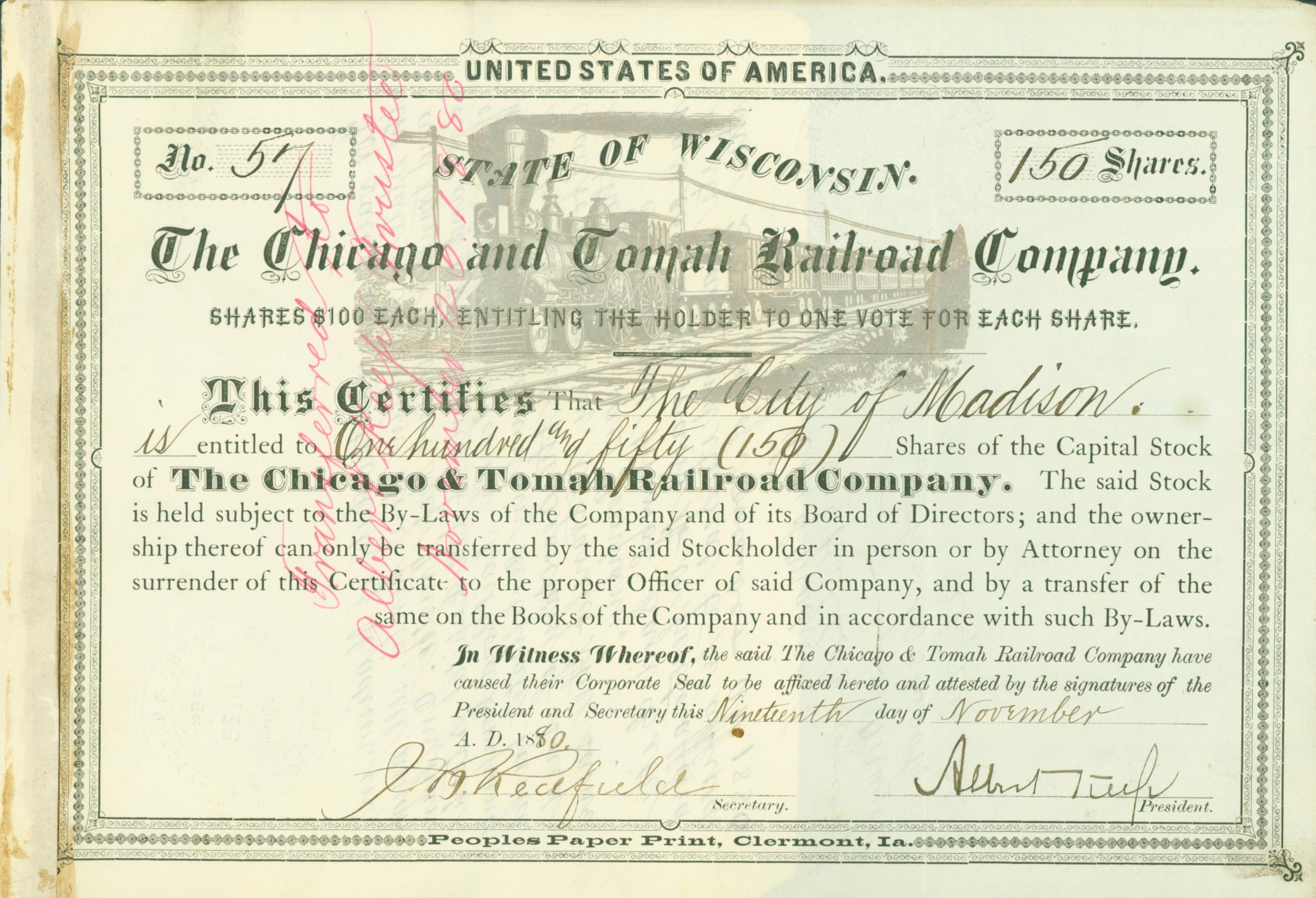
Share of the Chicago and Tomah Railroad Company, issued 19 November 1880

The primary forces behind the Chicago and Tomah Railroad were William Larrabee and D. R. W. Williams, both from Clermont, Iowa. The company's line was to run from Tomah, Wisconsin, to Chicago, via Mineral Point, Wisconsin, and Freeport, Illinois. The company was incorporated in Wisconsin on October 21, 1872. The company completed a 31-mile (50 km) 3 ft (914 mm) narrow gauge line between Woodman, on the Wisconsin River, and Lancaster, in 1877. In 1879 the company built east from Fennimore through Montfort, toward the northern end of the narrow gauge Galena and Southern Wisconsin Railroad. The company also graded a line north from Wauzeka, but never laid rail nor bridged the Wisconsin River. This grade was later taken over by the Kickapoo Valley and Northern Railway.

At this point the Chicago and North Western Railway took a financial interest in both narrow gauge companies. The Galena and Southern Wisconsin Railroad was reorganized as the Galena and Wisconsin Railroad and was consolidated with the Chicago and Tomah Railroad to create a new company of the same name, but incorporated in both Illinois and Wisconsin. This was effective on August 3, 1880. The new Chicago and Tomah constructed the 8 miles (13 km) between Montfort Junction and Rewey to connect the two networks.

Meanwhile, the Chicago and Tomah was building a new 60-mile (97 km) standard gauge line from Madison to Montfort, in order to connect the narrow gauge system with the rest of the North Western's network. This work was ongoing when the Chicago and Tomah was consolidated with the Milwaukee and Madison Railway on December 3, 1880, to form a new company of that name. That line was completed in 1881. Most of the narrow gauge network was converted to standard gauge in 1882. The exception was the Chicago and Tomah's line between Fennimore and Woodman, which remained a narrow gauge line until its abandonment in 1926.

== Lines ==
The Chicago and Tomah's line between Fennimore and Woodman was never converted to standard gauge and was abandoned on January 30, 1926. The line from Lancaster to Montfort, together with the Milwaukee and Madison's from Monfort to Madison, was known as the Lancaster Subdivision. Most of that line, including all of the former Chicago and Tomah trackage, was abandoned in 1980.
