= Fennimore (town), Wisconsin =

Fennimore, Wisconsin
- Town
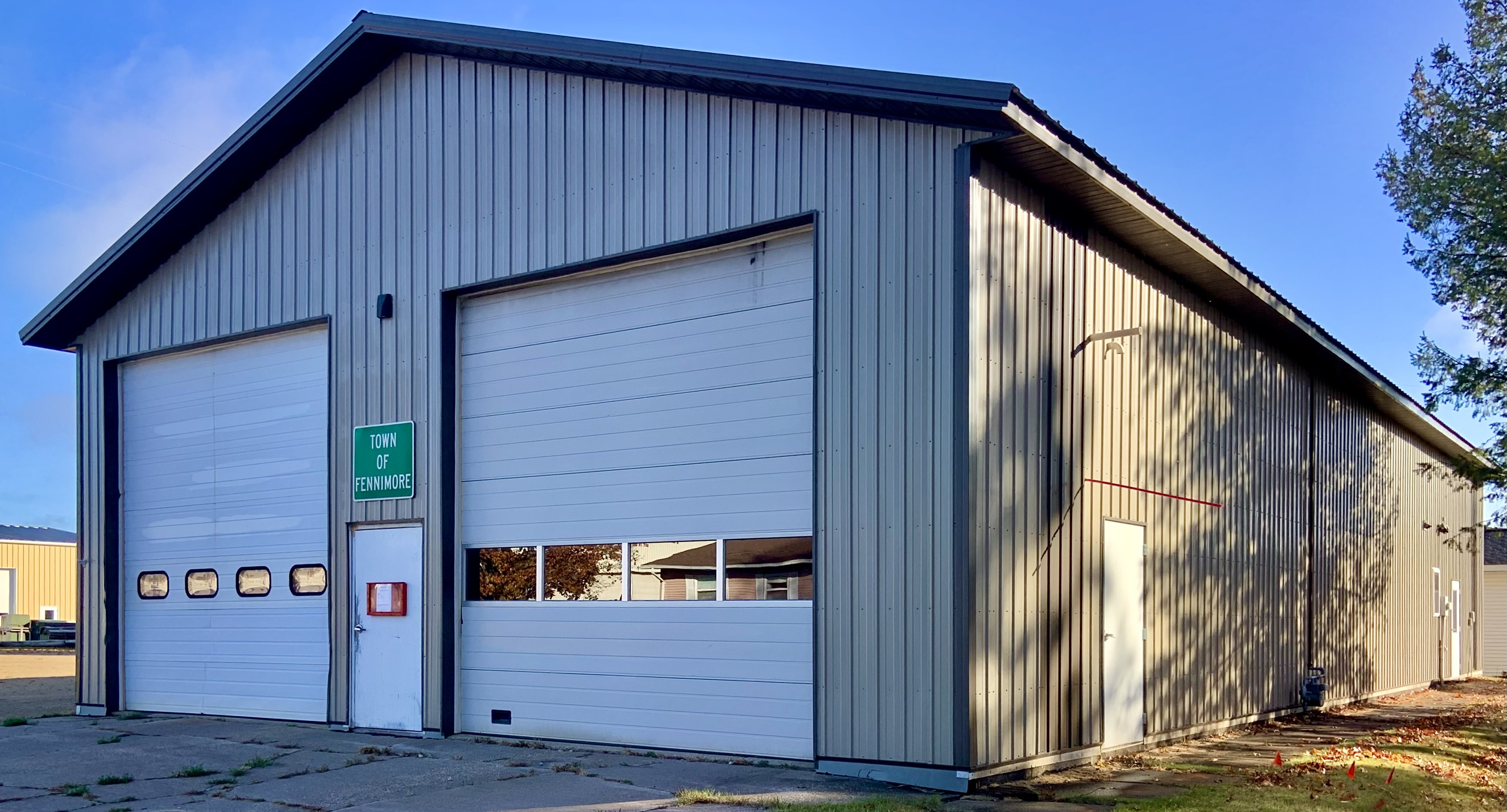
- Town hall

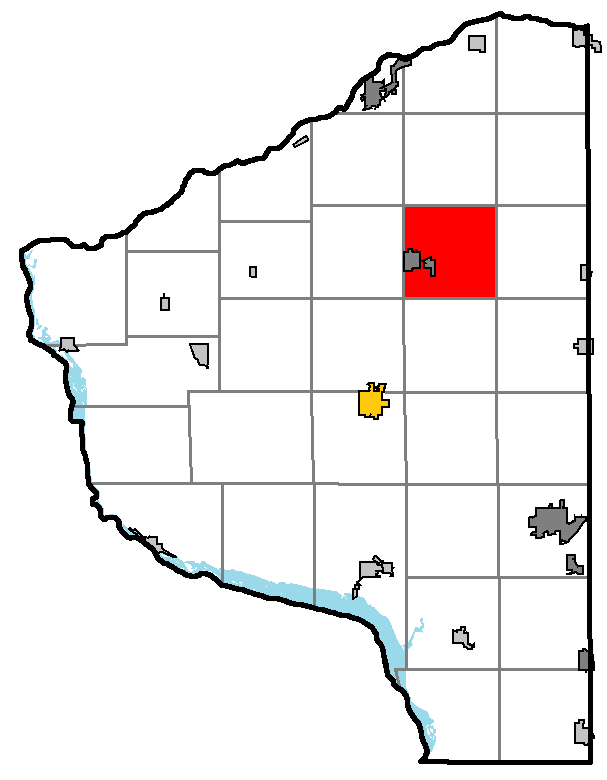
- Location of Fennimore, within Grant County, Wisconsin
- Coordinates: 42°59′5″N 90°36′22″W
- Country: United States
- State: Wisconsin
- County: Grant

Area
  - Total: 34.7 sq mi (90.0 km^{2})
  - Land: 34.7 sq mi (90.0 km^{2})
  - Water: 0 sq mi (0.0 km^{2})
- Elevation: 1,135 ft (346 m)

Population (2000)
  - Total: 594
  - Density: 17.1/sq mi (6.60/km^{2})
- Time zone: UTC-6 (Central (CST))
  - Summer (DST): UTC-5 (CDT)
- Area code: 608
- FIPS code: 55-25625
- GNIS feature ID: 1583198

Fennimore is a town in Grant County, Wisconsin, United States. The population was 594 at the 2020 census. The size of the town was reduced when Mount Ida was split off, and when the City of Fennimore was incorporated from a part of the town. The unincorporated community of Lancaster Junction, Wisconsin is located in the town. The unincorporated community of Preston is also located partially in the town.

== History ==
Fennimore was named for a settler who disappeared during the Black Hawk War.

== Geography ==
According to the United States Census Bureau, the town has a total area of 34.8 square miles (90.0 km^{2}), all land.

== Demographics ==
As of the census of 2000, there were 599 people, 199 households, and 157 families residing in the town. The population density was 17.2 people per square mile (6.7/km^{2}). There were 216 housing units at an average density of 2.4 persons/km^{2} (6.2 persons/sq mi). The racial makeup of the town was 100.00% White, 0.00% African American, 0.00% Native American, 0.00% Asian, 0.00% Pacific Islander, 0.00% from other races. 0.33% of the population were Hispanic or Latino of any race.

There were 199 households, out of which 33.7% had children under the age of 18 living with them, 69.3% were married couples living together, 7.5% have a woman whose husband does not live with her, and 21.1% were non-families. 12.6% of all households were made up of individuals, and 5.5% had someone living alone who was 65 years of age or older. The average household size was 3.01 and the average family size was 3.27.

In the town, the population was spread out, with 29.0% under the age of 18, 9.7% from 18 to 24, 25.9% from 25 to 44, 24.5% from 45 to 64, and 10.9% who were 65 years of age or older. The median age was 37 years. For every 100 females, there were 112.4 males. For every 100 females age 18 and over, there were 113.6 males.

The median income for a household in the town was $36,400, and the median income for a family was $38,393. Males had a median income of $25,536 versus $20,833 for females. The per capita income for the town was $13,360. 17.2% of the population and 11.5% of families were below the poverty line. Out of the total people living in poverty, 30.6% are under the age of 18 and 3.3% are 65 or older.

== Notable people ==
- Edward Heathcote, State legislator; was Chairman of the town and a member of the Town Board
- Gottlieb Wehrle, State legislator and farmer; lived in the portion of the town which became Mount Ida, and was twice chairman of the Town Board; the unincorporated community of Werley is named after him
