= John Monteith (disambiguation) =

John Monteith (1929–2012) was a British scientist.

John Monteith may also refer to:

- John Monteith (actor) (1948–2018), American actor and comedian
- John Monteith (footballer) (1883–1918), Scottish footballer
- John Monteith (minister) (1788–1868), co-founder of the University of Michigan
- John Monteith (Wisconsin politician) (1829–1901), Wisconsin politician
- John C. Monteith (1853–1940), Canadian politician
