= John Monteith (Wisconsin politician) =

American politician (1829–1901)

Member of the Wisconsin State Assembly from the Grant 3rd district
- In office January 6, 1873 – January 5, 1874
- Preceded by: Samuel Abbott Ferrin
- Succeeded by: Gottlieb Wehrle

Personal details
- Born: July 11, 1829 Newton Stewart, Wigtownshire, Scotland, UK
- Died: January 16, 1901 (aged 71) Wingville, Wisconsin, U.S.
- Resting place: Ebenezer Cemetery, Clifton, Grant County, Wisconsin
- Party: Republican
- Occupation: Farmer

Military service
- Allegiance: United States
- Branch/service: United States Volunteers; Union Army
- Years of service: 1861–1863
- Rank: Sergeant, USV
- Unit: 7th Reg. Wis. Vol. Infantry
- Battles/wars: American Civil War

John Monteith (July 11, 1829 – January 16, 1901) was a Scottish American immigrant, farmer, and Republican politician. He was a member of the Wisconsin State Assembly, representing northeast Grant County during the 1873 session. He also served as a non-commissioned officer in the Iron Brigade of the Army of the Potomac during the American Civil War.

== Early life ==
John Monteith was born in the town of Newton Stewart, Wigtownshire, Scotland, in July 1829. He received a common school education in his native country and emigrated to the United States in 1850, along with his parents and siblings. They originally settled in Vermont, then moved to western New York and to Indiana in 1851. In the Winter of 1851–1852, he worked in Texas, before finally coming to Wisconsin in the Spring of 1852, where his family was temporarily settled in Janesville. He moved to the town of Liberty, in Grant County; he left Wisconsin to work in California in 1853, but returned to Liberty in 1857.

== Civil War service ==
In the first summer after the outbreak of the American Civil War, Monteith volunteered for service in the Union Army, along with his brother Samuel. They were enlisted in Company H of the 7th Wisconsin Infantry Regiment, which went east and was organized into a brigade in the Army of the Potomac which would soon become known as the Iron Brigade.

Monteith was promoted to corporal in his company while the brigade was in northern Virginia. In August 1862, their brigade saw their first major combat of the war. They were marching north from the Rappahannock with three other Union brigades near Gainesville, Virginia, where they encountered several brigades of Stonewall Jackson's corps. The 7th Wisconsin and its brigade engaged the enemy, withstanding the combined assault of five brigades for the entire afternoon and evening. This is where the brigade earned the nickname "Iron Brigade". The engagement came to be known as the "Battle of Gainesville" and is considered the first day of the Second Battle of Bull Run. Monteith was one of dozens of men wounded at Gainesville.

Monteith was subsequently promoted to sergeant, but due to his injury, he missed the subsequent Battle of Antietam, where his brother, Samuel, died. John Monteith ultimately resigned due to disability a few months later, in January 1863.

== Political career ==
Monteith returned to Grant County, Wisconsin, and in 1864 settled on a farm in the town of Fennimore, where he remained for much of the rest of his life. He became active in the Republican Party of Wisconsin, and was considered a Radical Republican. He was elected to the town board in 1870, and was chairman of the board in 1871 and 1872. As chairman of his town board, he was also a member of the Grant County Board of Supervisors in 1871 and 1872.

In the Fall of 1872, Monteith was the Republican nominee for Wisconsin State Assembly in Grant County's 3rd Assembly district, which then comprised roughly the northeast quadrant of the county. He went on to win the general election in November and represented that district in the 26th Wisconsin Legislature. He did not run for re-election in 1873.

He went on to serve two more years on the town board, in 1880 and 1886. Due to poor health, he largely retired from politics after this.

== Personal life and family ==
John Monteith was the fourth son of Andrew Monteith and his wife Isabelle (née Henry). John Monteith's parents and siblings also emigrated to the United States and lived out their lives in Grant County. His younger brothers, Samuel and Robert, served alongside him in the 7th Wisconsin Infantry; Samuel died at Antietam. His elder brother, William, served as postmaster of Willet, Wisconsin. Several nephews also served in local office in Grant County.

John Monteith married Elizabeth Dinsdale in 1866. They had four children together, though one child died in infancy.

In 1896, John Monteith moved to Linden, Wisconsin, to maintain the home of his wife's uncle, Reverend Matthew Dinsdale. They returned to Grant County in the Spring of 1900, moving to a new home in the unincorporated community of Preston. He suffered a steady decline in health and was largely confined to his bed from October 1900 until his death on January 16, 1901.

== Electoral history ==
=== Wisconsin Assembly (1872) ===
Wisconsin Assembly, Grant 3rd District Election, 1872
Party	Candidate	Votes	%	±%
General Election, November 5, 1872
Republican	John Monteith	948	57.49%	−2.48%
Liberal Republican	Gottleib Weherley	701	42.51%	
Plurality		247	14.98%	-4.95%
Total votes		1,649	100.0%	+39.27%
Republican hold				

Wisconsin State Assembly
Preceded by Samuel Abbott Ferrin	Member of the Wisconsin State Assembly from the Grant 3rd district January 6, 1873 – January 5, 1874	Succeeded by Gottlieb Wehrle
