= John Wehrle =

John Wehrle may refer to:

- John Baptist Vincent de Paul Wehrle (1855–1941), Swiss-born bishop
- John O. Wehrle (born 1941), American artist
