= Preston, Wisconsin =

Preston is the name of some places in the U.S. state of Wisconsin:

- Preston, Adams County, Wisconsin, a town
- Preston, Grant County, Wisconsin, an unincorporated community
- Preston, Trempealeau County, Wisconsin, a town
