= George Washington Ryland =

American politician

George Ryland
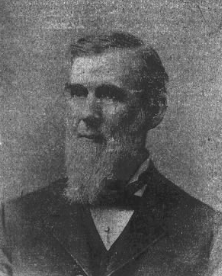

15th Lieutenant Governor of Wisconsin
- In office January 3, 1887 – January 5, 1891
- Governor: Jeremiah McLain Rusk; William D. Hoard
- Preceded by: Sam Fifield
- Succeeded by: Charles Jonas

Member of the Wisconsin Senate from the 16th district
- In office January 5, 1880 – January 5, 1885
- Preceded by: Oscar Clark Hathaway
- Succeeded by: Edward I. Kidd

Personal details
- Born: December 19, 1827 Garrett County, Maryland, U.S.
- Died: July 4, 1910 (aged 82) Lancaster, Wisconsin, U.S.
- Resting place: Hillside Cemetery, Lancaster, Wisconsin
- Party: Republican; Democratic (before 1860)
- Spouses: Nancy A. Logsdon (m. 1855; died 1856); Elvira M. Holloway (m. 1860; died 1910)
- Children: C. H. Ryland^{(b. 1856; died 1860)}

George Washington Ryland (December 19, 1827 – July 4, 1910) was an American merchant, banker, and Republican politician. He served as the 15th lieutenant governor of Wisconsin (1887–1891) and operated the first bank in Lancaster, Wisconsin.

== Biography ==
George W. Ryland was born near Selbysport in Garrett County, Maryland. He was raised and educated there, teaching country school in the winters to pay for his own education.

In April 1853 he moved to Lancaster, Wisconsin, which would be his home for the rest of his life. He was employed by former Wisconsin governor Nelson Dewey to mow hay, earning a dollar a day. Later that year, he was employed as a clerk in the store of John Alcorn, and from there became a partner in a general goods store with the brothers John and Simon Lewis. In 1860, he and his brother-in-law, John Chandler Holloway, bought out a grocery business and its building and constructed a new brick store in its place. In that building, they also began operating a bank in 1865.

They eventually closed their mercantile business, sold the old building, and expanded their banking business into a new two-story building under the business name "Ryland & Holloway".

In politics, Ryland was originally a Democrat, and was appointed postmaster at Lancaster during the administration of Franklin Pierce. He subsequently became a Republican, and was reappointed postmaster under presidents Abraham Lincoln and Andrew Johnson. As a Republican, Ryland was elected to two terms in the Wisconsin State Senate, serving from 1880 until 1885. He was subsequently elected Lieutenant Governor of Wisconsin in 1886 and re-elected in 1888. He was chairman of the town board for 20 years and chairman of the county board for 17 years, leaving both positions in 1891, when his term as Lieutenant Governor expired.

Also during his term as Lieutenant Governor, he became involved in the effort to organize the State Bank of Grant County, which was established in 1888 with Ryland serving as president. Ryland operated the bank for the next ten years, retiring in 1899.

Ryland died at his home in Lancaster, July 4, 1910.

== Electoral history ==
=== Wisconsin Senate (1879, 1881) ===
Wisconsin Senate, 16th District Election, 1879
Party	Candidate	Votes	%	±%
General Election, November 4, 1879
Republican	George W. Ryland	3,129	57.65%	+4.03%
Democratic	James Wilson Seaton	1,676	30.88%	−0.14%
Greenback	S. N. Jones	623	11.48%	−3.89%
Plurality		1,453	26.77%	+4.18%
Total votes		5,428	100.0%	-17.42%
Republican hold				

Wisconsin Senate, 16th District Election, 1881
Party	Candidate	Votes	%	±%
General Election, November 8, 1881
Republican	George W. Ryland (incumbent)	2,868	65.61%	+7.97%
Democratic	George S. Whitcher	1,370	31.34%	+0.47%
Greenback	S. N. Jones	133	3.04%	−8.43%
Plurality		1,498	34.27%	+7.50%
Total votes		4,371	100.0%	-19.47%
Republican hold				

=== Wisconsin Lieutenant Governor (1886, 1888) ===
Wisconsin Lieutenant Gubernatorial Election, 1886
Party	Candidate	Votes	%	±%
General Election, November 2, 1886
Republican	George W. Ryland	131,063	45.38%	−4.90%
Democratic	John Day Putnam	116,424	40.31%	−4.73%
Labor	George A. Loyd	21,772	7.54%	
Prohibition	Charles Alexander	17,188	5.95%	+3.34%
Plurality		14,639	5.07%	-0.17%
Total votes		288,840	100.0%	-10.38%
Republican hold				

Wisconsin Lieutenant Gubernatorial Election, 1888
Party	Candidate	Votes	%	±%
General Election, November 6, 1886
Republican	George W. Ryland (incumbent)	176,488	49.78%	+4.40%
Democratic	Andrew Kull	154,735	43.64%	+3.33%
Prohibition	Chris Nelson	14,533	4.10%	−1.85%
Labor	Nelson E. Allen	8,763	2.47%	−5.07%
	Scattering	46	0.01%	
Plurality		21,753	6.14%	+1.07%
Total votes		354,565	100.0%	+22.75%
Republican hold				

Party political offices
Preceded by Sam Fifield	Republican nominee for Lieutenant Governor of Wisconsin; 1886, 1888	Succeeded by Joseph B. Treat
Wisconsin Senate
Preceded by Oscar Clark Hathaway	Member of the Wisconsin Senate from the 16th district January 5, 1880 – January 5, 1885	Succeeded by Edward I. Kidd
Political offices
Preceded by Sam Fifield	Lieutenant Governor of Wisconsin; January 3, 1887 – January 5, 1891	Succeeded by Charles Jonas
