= Woodman (town), Wisconsin =

Town in Grant County, Wisconsin

Woodman, Wisconsin
- Town
- Town of Woodman
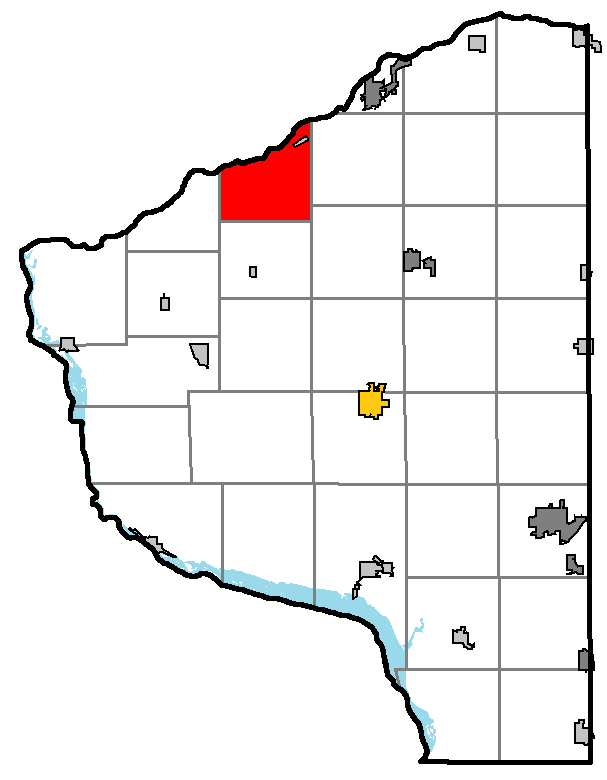
- Location of Woodman, within Grant County, Wisconsin

- Location of Grant County, Wisconsin
- Coordinates: 43°03′09″N 90°50′13″W
- Country: United States
- State: Wisconsin
- County: Grant

Area
  - Total: 27.49 sq mi (71.2 km^{2})
  - Land: 26.81 sq mi (69.4 km^{2})
  - Water: 0.68 sq mi (1.8 km^{2})

Population (2020)
  - Total: 158
  - Density: 5.89/sq mi (2.28/km^{2})
- Time zone: UTC-6 (Central (CST))
  - Summer (DST): UTC-5 (CDT)
- ZIP Code: 53827
- Area code(s): 608 and 353
- GNIS feature ID: 1584476

Woodman is a town in Grant County in the U.S. state of Wisconsin. The population was 158 at the 2020 census. The Village of Woodman is located within the town.

== Geography ==
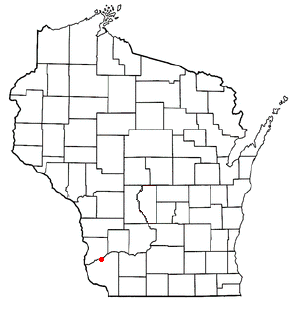
Location of Woodman (town), Wisconsin

According to the United States Census Bureau, the town has a total area of 27.5 square miles (71.2 km^{2}), of which 26.7 square miles (69.2 km^{2}) is land and 0.8 square mile (2.0 km^{2}) (2.80%) is water.

== Demographics ==
At the 2000 United States census there were 194 people, 75 households, and 57 families living in the town. The population density was 7.3 people per square mile (2.8/km^{2}). There were 89 housing units at an average density of 3.3 per square mile (1.3/km^{2}). The racial makeup of the town was 100.00% White. 0.00% of the population were Hispanic or Latino of any race. Of the 75 households 28.0% had children under the age of 18 living with them, 64.0% were married couples living together, and 24.0% were non-families. 21.3% of households were one person and 10.7% were one person aged 65 or older. The average household size was 2.59 and the average family size was 2.95.

The age distribution was 24.7% under the age of 18, 9.8% from 18 to 24, 22.2% from 25 to 44, 24.7% from 45 to 64, and 18.6% 65 or older. The median age was 42 years. For every 100 females, there were 115.6 males. For every 100 females age 18 and over, there were 111.6 males.

The median household income was $33,333 and the median family income was $38,125. Males had a median income of $23,750 versus $25,625 for females. The per capita income for the town was $13,024. About 10.9% of families and 21.5% of the population were below the poverty line, including 41.8% of those under the age of eighteen and 11.5% of those sixty five or over.
