= John Chandler Holloway =

American politician (1826–1901)

John C. Holloway

Member of the Wisconsin Senate from the 16th district
- In office January 1, 1872 – January 3, 1876
- Preceded by: George Cochrane Hazelton
- Succeeded by: Oscar Clark Hathaway

Member of the Wisconsin State Assembly from the Grant 3rd district
- In office January 2, 1871 – January 1, 1872
- Preceded by: William P. Dewey
- Succeeded by: Samuel Abbott Ferrin

Personal details
- Born: July 7, 1826 York, New York, U.S.
- Died: February 26, 1901 (aged 74) Cloverdale, California, U.S.
- Resting place: Cloverdale Cemetery, Cloverdale
- Party: Republican
- Spouse: Mary E. Baldwin (m. 1853; died 1896)
- Relatives: George Washington Ryland (brother-in-law)

John Chandler Holloway (July 7, 1826 – February 26, 1901) was an American farmer, businessman, Republican politician, and Wisconsin pioneer. He served four years in the Wisconsin Senate (1872–1876) and one year in the Wisconsin State Assembly (1871), representing Grant County.

== Biography ==
Holloway was born on July 7, 1826, in York, New York. Later, he moved to Lancaster, Wisconsin. Chandler died in Cloverdale, California, on February 26, 1901.

== Career ==
Holloway was a member of the Assembly during the 1871 session and of the Senate from the 16th District during the 1872, 1873, 1874 and 1875 session. In 1874, he was chosen to be President Pro Tem. Previously, Holloway was Chairman of the Town Board of Lancaster from 1857 to 1861. He was a Republican.
