= Thomas Jefferson Graham =

19th century American politician

Thomas J. Graham

Member of the Wisconsin State Assembly from the Grant 3rd district
- In office January 7, 1878 – January 6, 1879
- Preceded by: Daniel R. Sylvester
- Succeeded by: John Brindley

Personal details
- Born: April 17, 1832 Candor, New York, U.S.
- Died: October 1, 1902 (aged 70) Spokane, Washington, U.S.
- Cause of death: Tuberculosis
- Resting place: Greenwood Memorial Terrace, Spokane, Washington
- Party: Democratic
- Spouse: Mary E. Sharpe (m. 1853)
- Children: Charles M. Graham; Carrie Belle (Birdsall); at least 2 others

Thomas Jefferson Graham (April 17, 1832 – October 1, 1902) was an American cattle rancher, politician, and pioneer of Wisconsin and Montana. He served one term in the Wisconsin State Assembly, representing Grant County during the 1878 session.

== Biography ==
Thomas Jefferson Graham was born in Tioga County, New York, in April 1832. He moved west with his parents as a child, stopping in Illinois in 1835, then settling in Platteville, Wisconsin, in 1836. He worked on his father's farm until age 17, when he went to California for the California Gold Rush. He returned to Wisconsin and went to work as a merchant in Richland County. He then relocated to Muscoda, Wisconsin, in 1864 and established a company, known as Graham & Bremer, which operated as general merchants and dealers of grain and livestock for over a decade. In addition to their general store, they operated three warehouses in the town.

At Muscoda, Graham became involved in local affairs and served several terms on the town board and the Grant County board of supervisors. In 1877, he was elected to the Wisconsin State Assembly from Grant County's 3rd Assembly district—the northern half of the state—and served in the 31st Wisconsin Legislature. The 1877 election and 1878 session were unique for the emergence of the Greenback movement as a significant third party in Wisconsin, and the Democratic Party embraced a tighter coalition with the new party in subsequent elections. For his part, Graham was narrowly elected in a three-way race in 1877. In 1878, Graham ran for re-election as a Greenback-Democrat fusion candidate, but lost to Republican John Brindley.

During the 1880s, Graham traveled to the Montana Territory and decided to establish a cattle ranch in Custer County. As of 1885, he managed about 700 head of cattle. He served on the county board here in the 1890s, but came to Spokane, Washington, in 1895, looking to permanently relocate.

Graham suffered from Tuberculosis for nearly a year and finally died at his home in Spokane on October 1, 1902.

== Personal life and family ==
Thomas J. Graham married Mary E. Sharpe of Indiana in 1853. They had at least four children, two sons and two daughters, though at the time of his death only three children were living. His son, Charles M. Graham, moved to Hot Springs, Arkansas, and managed a furniture company and estate, of which Thomas J. Graham was a part-owner.

Graham was active in Freemasonry throughout his adult life.

== Electoral history ==
=== Wisconsin Assembly (1877, 1878) ===
Wisconsin Assembly, Grant 3rd District Election, 1877
Party	Candidate	Votes	%	±%
General Election, November 6, 1877
Democratic	Thomas J. Graham	648	36.57%	−10.48%
Republican	Jos. Horsfall	569	32.11%	−20.84%
Greenback	L. G. Armstrong	555	31.32%	
Plurality		79	4.46%	-1.44%
Total votes		1,772	100.0%	-25.89%
Democratic gain from Republican				

Wisconsin Assembly, Grant 3rd District Election, 1878
Party	Candidate	Votes	%	±%
General Election, November 5, 1878
Republican	John Brindley	1,110	54.84%	+22.73%
Democratic	Thomas J. Graham (incumbent)	914	45.16%	+8.59%
Plurality		196	9.68%	+5.23%
Total votes		2,024	100.0%	+14.22%
Republican gain from Democratic				

Wisconsin State Assembly
Preceded by Daniel R. Sylvester	Member of the Wisconsin State Assembly from the Grant 3rd district January 7, 1878 – January 6, 1879	Succeeded by John Brindley
