= Mount Ida, Wisconsin =

- Town
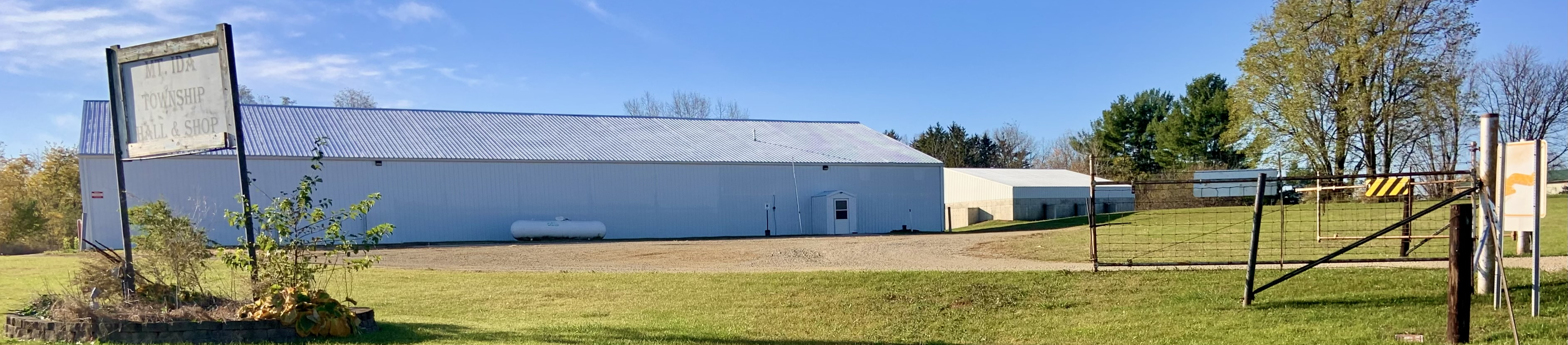
- Town hall on US 18

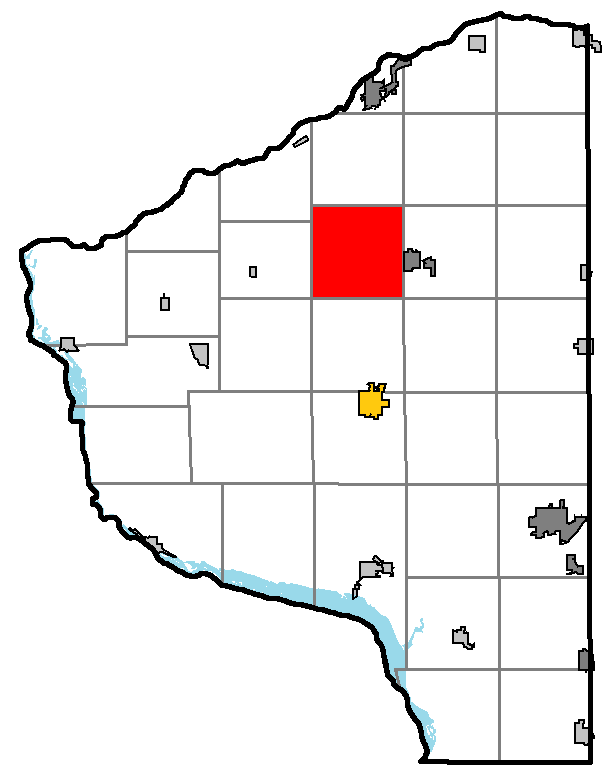
- Location of Mount Ida in Grant County, Wisconsin

- Location of Grant County, Wisconsin
- Coordinates: 42°59′10″N 90°43′30″W
- Country: United States
- State: Wisconsin
- County: Grant

Area
  - Total: 36.3 sq mi (94.0 km^{2})
  - Land: 36.3 sq mi (94.0 km^{2})
  - Water: 0 sq mi (0.0 km^{2})
- Elevation: 1,198 ft (365 m)

Population (2020)
  - Total: 561
  - Density: 15.5/sq mi (5.97/km^{2})
- Time zone: UTC-6 (Central (CST))
  - Summer (DST): UTC-5 (CDT)
- Area code: 608
- FIPS code: 55-54775
- GNIS feature ID: 1583764

Mount Ida is a town in Grant County, Wisconsin, United States. The population was 561 at the 2020 census. The unincorporated communities of Mount Ida and Werley are located in the town.

== Geography ==
According to the United States Census Bureau, the town has a total area of 36.3 square miles (94.0 km^{2}), all land.

== Demographics ==
As of the 2000 census, there were 523 people, 187 households, and 147 families living in the town. The population density was 14.4 people per square mile (5.6/km^{2}). There were 204 housing units at an average density of 5.6 per square mile (2.2/km^{2}). The racial makeup of the town was 99.62% White, 0.19% Asian, and 0.19% from two or more races. Hispanic or Latino of any race were 0.57% of the population.

There were 187 households, out of which, 35.8% had children under the age of 18 living with them, 70.1% were married couples living together, 2.7% had a female householder with no husband present, and 20.9% were non-families. 17.1% of households were one person, and 8.6% were one person aged 65 or older. The average household size was 2.80 and the average family size was 3.14.

The age distribution was 27.7% under the age of 18, 9.4% from 18 to 24, 24.5% from 25 to 44, 27.7% from 45 to 64, and 10.7% 65 or older. The median age was 38 years. For every 100 females, there were 110.0 males. For every 100 females age 18 and over, there were 110.0 males.

The median household income was $41,250 and the median family income was $44,750. Males had a median income of $25,441 versus $25,938 for females. The per capita income for the town was $18,700. About 7.3% of families and 13.3% of the population were below the poverty line, including 33.1% of those under age 18 and none of those age 65 or over.

== Notable people ==
- Joshua B. Bradbury, farmer, teacher, and Wisconsin State Representative
- Richard Kreul, farmer and member of the Wisconsin State Senate
- Gottlieb Wehrle, State Representative and farmer; Werley is named after him
