= Mount Ida (community), Wisconsin =

Mount Ida, Wisconsin
- Unincorporated community
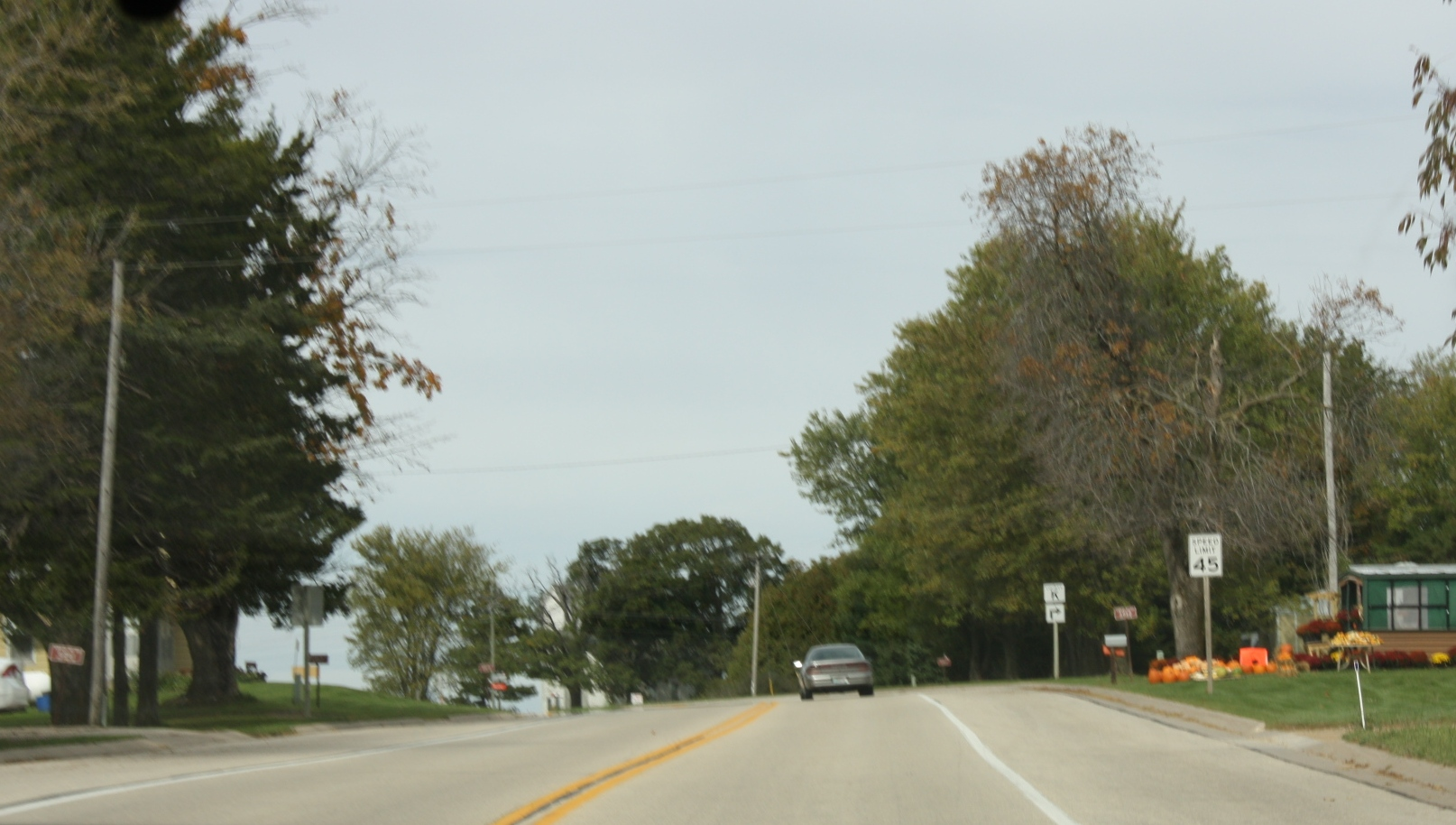
- Downtown Mount Ida

- Location within Wisconsin Location within the United States
- Coordinates: 42°58′19″N 90°45′39″W
- Country: United States
- State: Wisconsin
- County: Grant
- Town: Mount Ida
- Elevation: 1,207 ft (368 m)
- Time zone: UTC-6 (Central (CST))
  - Summer (DST): UTC-5 (CDT)
- Area code: 608
- GNIS feature ID: 1569818

Mount Ida is an unincorporated community located in the town of Mount Ida in Grant County, Wisconsin, United States. It is located along U.S. Route 18.

== Images ==
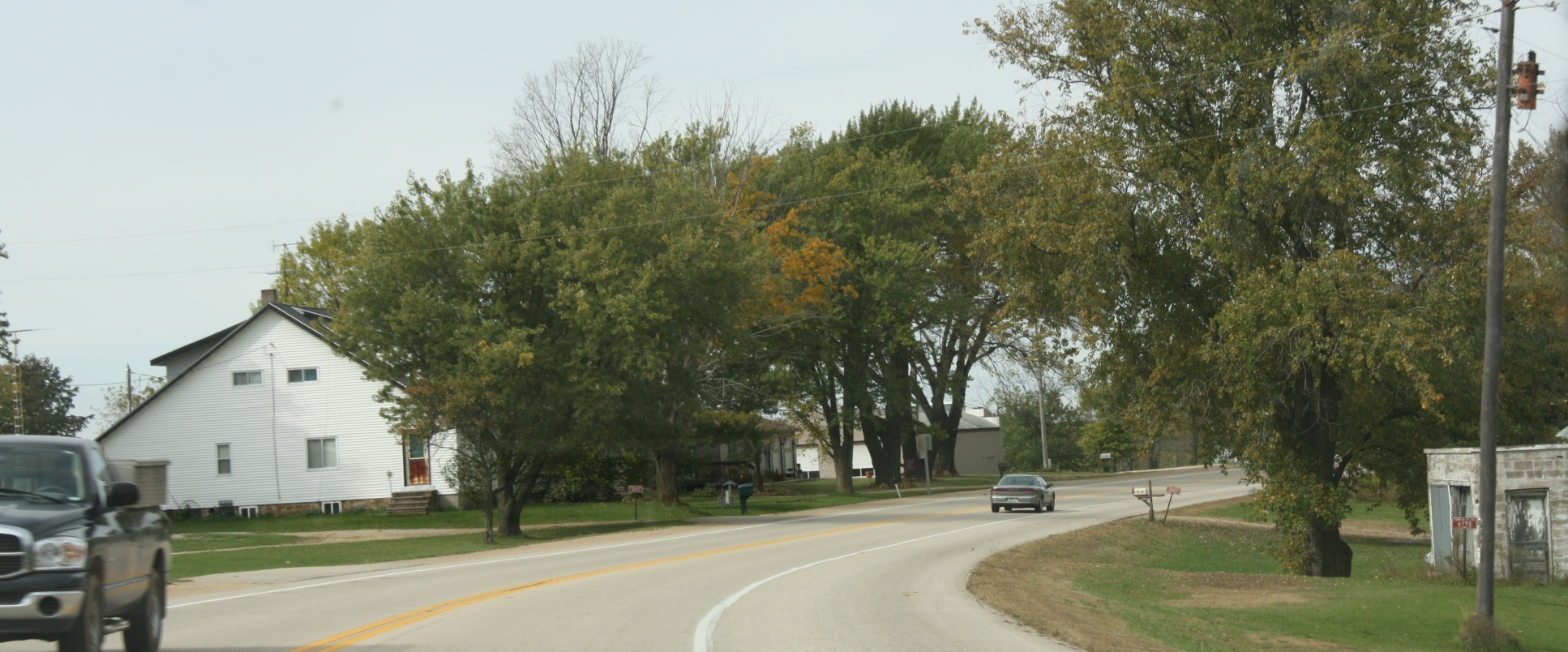
A curve on US 18 in Mount Ida

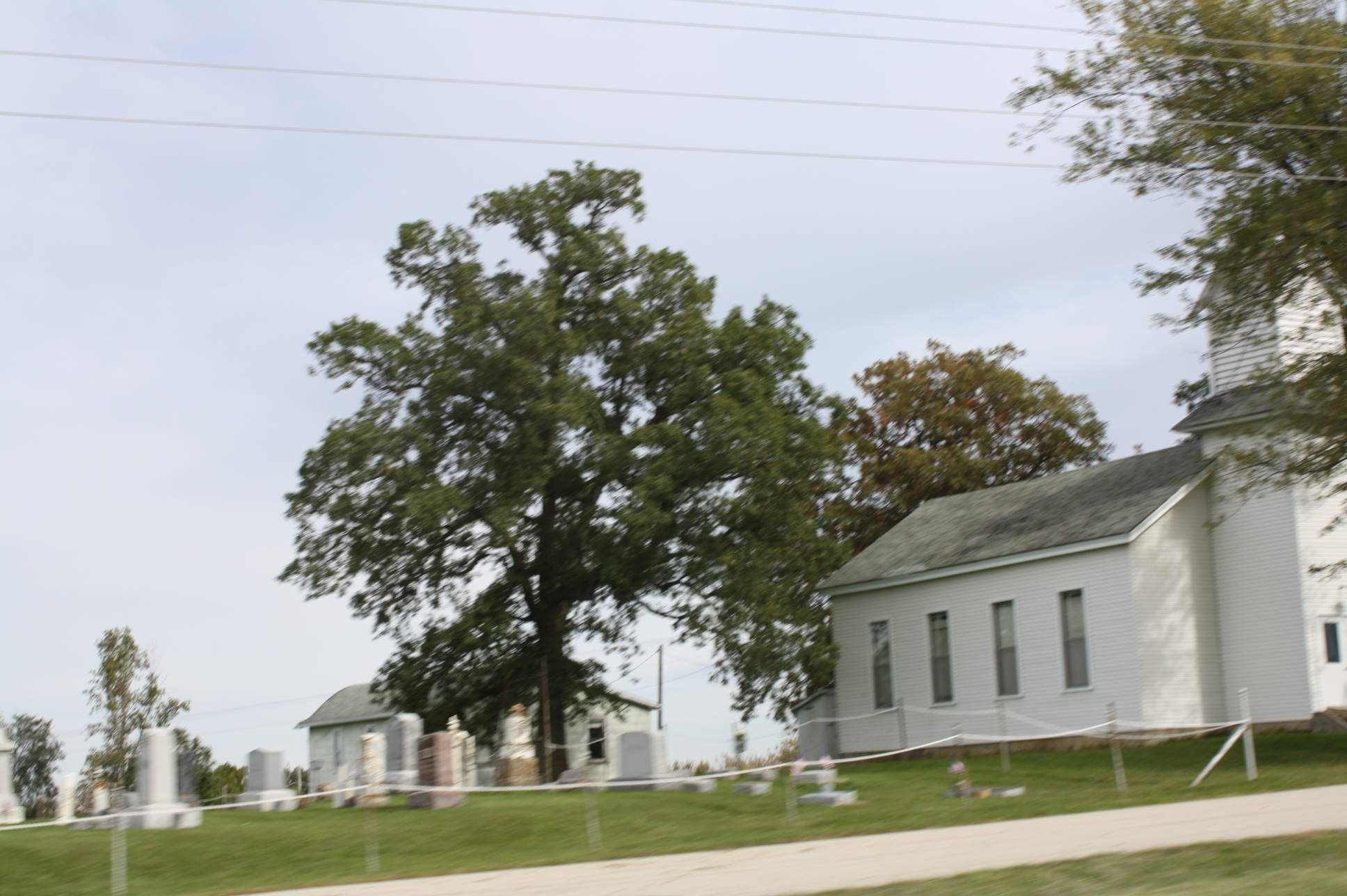
Church in Mount Ida
