= Edward Heathcote =

American politician

Edward Heathcote (April 15, 1859 – January 17, 1944) was a member of the Wisconsin State Assembly.

== Biography ==
Heathcote was born on April 15, 1859, in Monterey, Wisconsin. He later moved to the Town of Fennimore, Wisconsin.

== Career ==
Heathcote was elected to the Assembly in 1914, where he served on the finance committee. Additionally, he was Chairman of Fennimore and a member of the Fennimore Town Board. He was a Republican.
