= Oscar Clark Hathaway =

19th century American politician

Oscar C. Hathaway

Member of the Wisconsin Senate from the 16th district
- In office January 3, 1876 – January 5, 1880
- Preceded by: John C. Holloway
- Succeeded by: George W. Ryland

Personal details
- Born: March 1, 1833 Swanton, Vermont, U.S.
- Died: November 1, 1909 (aged 76) Exeter, California, U.S.
- Resting place: Home of Peace Cemetery,Porterville, California
- Party: Republican
- Spouse: Mary Jane Hodge (died 1919)
- Children: Harry May Hathaway; (b. 1868; died 1939)
- Occupation: Miner, businessman

Oscar Clark Hathaway (March 1, 1833 – November 1, 1909) was an American miner, ore merchant, and Republican politician. He served four years in the Wisconsin State Senate, representing Grant County.

== Biography ==
Hathaway was born on March 1, 1833, in Swanton (town), Vermont. He moved to Wisconsin in 1853, and engaged in iron manufacturing in Mayville, Wisconsin, and lead mining in Beetown, Wisconsin.

He died in Exeter, California, on November 1, 1909. He was buried at Home of Peace Cemetery in Porterville, California.

== Political career ==
A Republican, Hathaway was Chairman of the Town Board of Beetown in 1872 and 1873. He represented the 16th District in the State Senate during the 1876, 1877, 1878, and 1879 sessions.

Wisconsin Senate
Preceded by John C. Holloway	Member of the Wisconsin Senate from the 16th district January 3, 1876 – January 5, 1880	Succeeded by George W. Ryland
