= Samuel Abbott Ferrin =

19th century American physician and politician

Samuel A. Ferrin

Member of the Wisconsin State Assembly from the Grant 3rd district
- In office January 1, 1872 – January 6, 1873
- Preceded by: John Chandler Holloway
- Succeeded by: John Monteith

Personal details
- Born: January 19, 1831 Saint-Thomas, Upper Canada
- Died: March 29, 1875 (aged 44) Mineral Point, Wisconsin, U.S.
- Resting place: Union Grove Cemetery, Darlington, Wisconsin
- Party: Republican
- Spouse: Mary Margaret Mason
- Children: Harriett E. (Osborne)^{(b. 1853; died 1936)}; Charles Andrews Ferrin^{(b. 1855; died 1948)}; Frank A. Ferrin^{(b. 1857; died 1928)}
- Education: Rush Medical College
- Profession: Physician

Military service
- Allegiance: United States
- Branch/service: United States Volunteers; Union Army
- Years of service: 1862–1865
- Rank: 1st Assistant Surgeon, USV
- Unit: 32nd Reg. Wis. Vol. Infantry; 44th Reg. Wis. Vol. Infantry
- Battles/wars: American Civil War

Samuel Abbott Ferrin (January 19, 1831 – March 29, 1875) was a Canadian American, immigrant, medical doctor, and Republican politician. He was a member of the Wisconsin State Assembly, representing Grant County during the 1872 session. He also served as a hospital steward and surgeon in the Union Army during the American Civil War.

== Biography ==
Ferrin was born on January 19, 1831, in what is now Saint-Thomas, Quebec. He graduated from Rush Medical College. During the American Civil War, Ferrin originally enlisted with the 32nd Wisconsin Infantry Regiment of the Union Army. He later became a surgeon in Wingville, Wisconsin and was commissioned First Assistant Surgeon of the 44th Wisconsin Infantry Regiment.

== Political career ==
Ferrin was a member of the Assembly during the 1872 session. He was a Republican.
