= Millville, Wisconsin =

Town of Millville
- Town
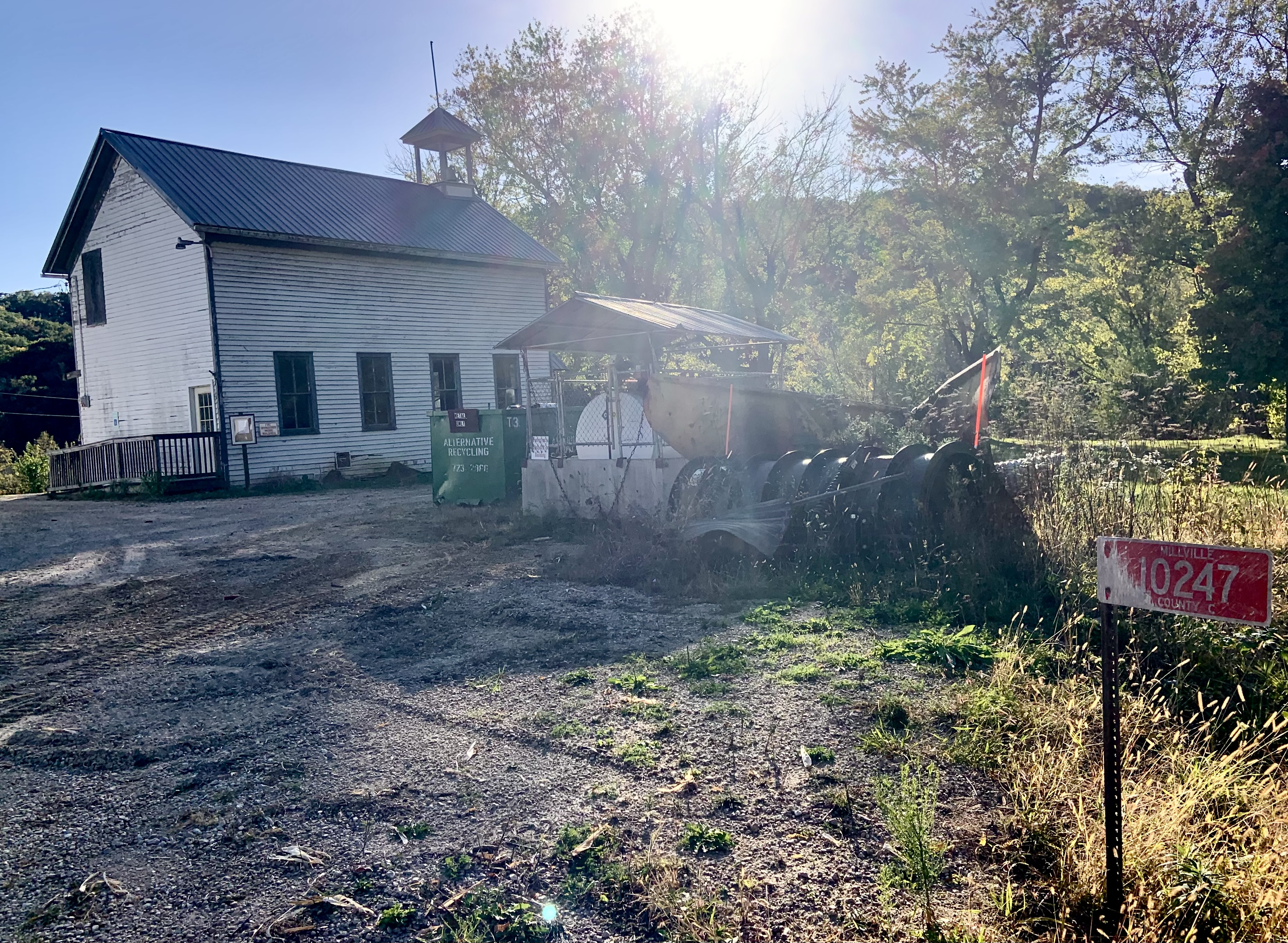
- Town hall

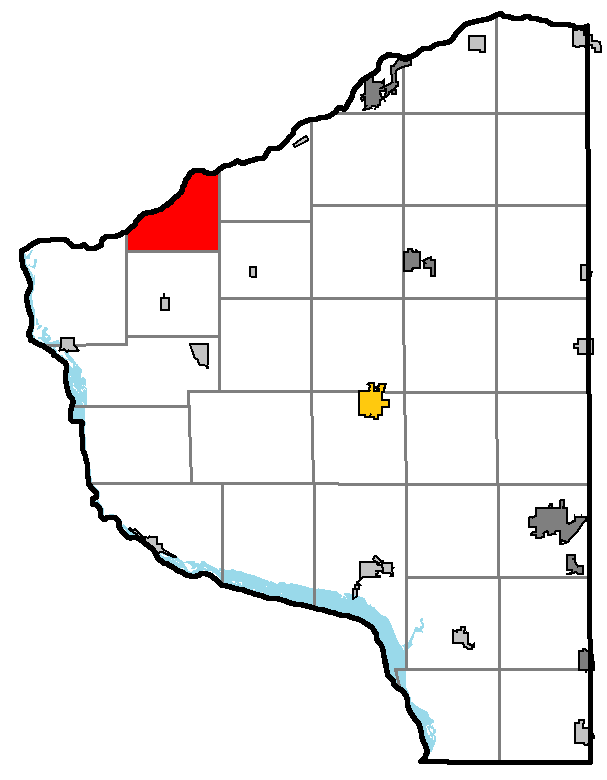
- Location of the Town of Millville in Grant County, Wisconsin

- Location of Grant County, Wisconsin
- Coordinates: 43°0′53″N 90°56′17″W
- Country: United States
- State: Wisconsin
- County: Grant

Area
  - Total: 21.7 sq mi (56.3 km^{2})
  - Land: 21.0 sq mi (54.3 km^{2})
  - Water: 0.73 sq mi (1.9 km^{2})
- Elevation: 699 ft (213 m)

Population (2020)
  - Total: 127
  - Density: 6.06/sq mi (2.34/km^{2})
- Time zone: UTC-6 (Central (CST))
  - Summer (DST): UTC-5 (CDT)
- Area code: 608
- FIPS code: 55-52150
- GNIS feature ID: 1583720

The Town of Millville is a town in Grant County, Wisconsin, United States. The population was 127 at the 2020 census.

== Geography ==
According to the United States Census Bureau, the town has a total area of 21.7 square miles (56.3 km^{2}), of which 21.0 square miles (54.3 km^{2}) is land and 0.8 square mile (1.9 km^{2}) (3.45%) is water.

== Demographics ==
At the 2000 census there were 147 people, 63 households, and 45 families living in the town. The population density was 7.0 people per square mile (2.7/km^{2}). There were 75 housing units at an average density of 3.6 per square mile (1.4/km^{2}). The racial makeup of the town was 99.32% White, and 0.68% from two or more races. Of the 63 households 31.7% had children under the age of 18 living with them, 68.3% were married couples living together, 3.2% had a female householder with no husband present, and 27.0% were non-families. 23.8% of households were one person and 7.9% were one person aged 65 or older. The average household size was 2.33 and the average family size was 2.76.

The age distribution was 21.1% under the age of 18, 6.1% from 18 to 24, 27.9% from 25 to 44, 32.0% from 45 to 64, and 12.9% 65 or older. The median age was 42 years. For every 100 females, there were 107.0 males. For every 100 females age 18 and over, there were 114.8 males.

The median household income was $43,750 and the median family income was $53,750. Males had a median income of $27,500 versus $18,750 for females. The per capita income for the town was $20,618. There were none of the families and 1.3% of the population living below the poverty line, including no under eighteens and none of those over 64.

== Notable people ==
- Edward I. Kidd, Wisconsin state legislator and businessman, was born in Millville
- Clifford D. Simak, science fiction author; often set his stories in Millville, notably in Way Station and All Flesh is Grass. In Time and Again the hero goes back in time to nearby Bridgeport, Wisconsin. Also, in Simak's classic novel City, the location of the fictional Webster house is thought to be set in the vicinity of Millville.
