= R. W. Wehrle =

American naturalist

R. W. Wehrle was a naturalist who resided in Indiana, Pennsylvania. Wehrle's salamander was named in his honour. He collected many of the specimens from which the species was first described.
