= Wehrli =

Wehrli is a Swiss surname. Notable people with the surname include:

- Betty Wehrli-Knobel (1904–1998), Swiss journalist and writer
- Grant Wehrli, American politician
- Hans Wehrli (1927–2011), Swiss sprinter
- Heinz Wehrli (born 1953), Swiss equestrian
- Johann Jakob Wehrli (1790–1855), Swiss educator
- Josef Wehrli (born 1954), Swiss racing cyclist
- Max Wehrli (1909–1998), Swiss Germanist
- Max Wehrli (athlete) (1930–2014), Swiss decathlete
- Mathias Wehrli (born 1962), Swiss football defender
- Roger Wehrli (born 1947), American football player
- Roger Wehrli (footballer) (born 1956), Swiss football midfielder
- Ursus Wehrli (born 1969), Swiss comedian and artist
- Werner Wehrli (1892–1944), Swiss composer
