= John Monteith (footballer) =

Scottish footballer

Personal information
- Full name: John Buchanan Monteith
- Date of birth: 5 December 1883
- Place of birth: Dennistoun, Scotland
- Date of death: 27 September 1918 (aged 34)
- Place of death: Pas-de-Calais, France
- Position: Right back

Senior career*
Years	Team	Apps	(Gls)
1911–1912	Queen's Park	3	(0)
- * Club domestic league appearances and goals

John Buchanan Monteith (5 December 1883 – 27 September 1918) was a Scottish professional footballer who played as a right back in the Scottish League for Queen's Park.

== Personal life ==
Monteith served as a gunner in the Royal Garrison Artillery during the First World War and was killed in action in Pas-de-Calais on 27 September 1918. He was buried in Quéant Communal Cemetery British Extension.

== Career statistics ==
Appearances and goals by club, season and competition
Club	Season	League			Scottish Cup		Total	
Club	Season	Division	Apps	Goals	Apps	Goals	Apps	Goals
Queen's Park	1911–12	Scottish First Division	3	0	0	0	3	0
Career total			3	0	0	0	3	0
