= Preston, Grant County, Wisconsin =

Preston, Wisconsin
- Unincorporated community
- Location within Wisconsin Location within the United States
- Coordinates: 42°58′30″N 90°32′49″W
- Country: United States
- State: Wisconsin
- County: Grant
- Towns: Fennimore, Wingville
- Elevation: 1,161 ft (354 m)
- Time zone: UTC-6 (Central (CST))
  - Summer (DST): UTC-5 (CDT)
- Area code: 608
- GNIS feature ID: 1571923

Preston is an unincorporated community in the towns of Fennimore and Wingville, Grant County, Wisconsin, United States.

== History ==
A post office called Preston was established in 1880, and remained in operation until it was discontinued in 1920. The community was named for Matthew Preston, a pioneer settler.
