= Woodman, Wisconsin =

- Village
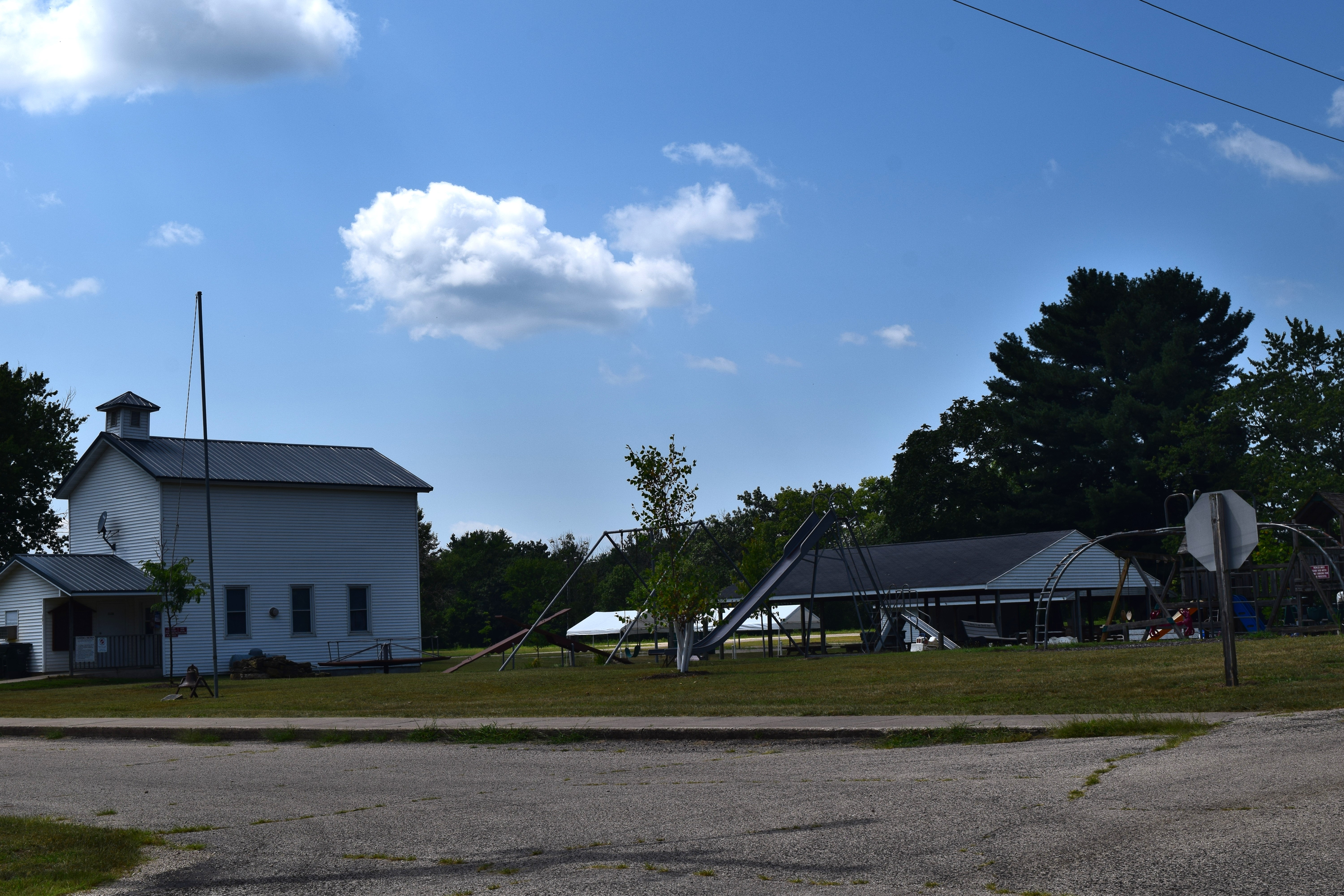
- Woodman village office and public park

- Location of Woodman in Grant County, Wisconsin.
- Coordinates: 43°3′49″N 90°49′23″W
- Country: United States
- State: Wisconsin
- County: Grant

Area
  - Total: 0.25 sq mi (0.64 km^{2})
  - Land: 0.25 sq mi (0.64 km^{2})
  - Water: 0 sq mi (0.00 km^{2})
- Elevation: 659 ft (201 m)

Population (2020)
  - Total: 118
  - Density: 480/sq mi (180/km^{2})
- Time zone: UTC-6 (Central (CST))
  - Summer (DST): UTC-5 (CDT)
- Area code: 608
- FIPS code: 55-88850
- GNIS feature ID: 1584476

Woodman is a village in Grant County in the U.S. state of Wisconsin. The population was 118 at the 2020 census. The village is located within the Town of Woodman.

== History ==
A post office called Woodman was established in 1863, and remained in operation until it was discontinued in 1995. The village was named for Captain E. E. Woodman, a railroad official.

== Geography ==
Woodman is located at 43°5′31″N 90°48′3″W (43.092098, -90.801077).

According to the United States Census Bureau, the village has a total area of 0.24 square miles (0.62 km^{2}), all land.

== Demographics ==
Historical population
Census	Pop.	Note	%±
1880	111		—
1920	138		—
1930	101		−26.8%
1940	108		6.9%
1950	149		38.0%
1960	112		−24.8%
1970	102		−8.9%
1980	116		13.7%
1990	120		3.4%
2000	96		−20.0%
2010	132		37.5%
2020	118		−10.6%
U.S. Decennial Census

=== 2010 census ===
As of the census of 2010, there were 132 people, 49 households, and 33 families living in the village. The population density was 550.0 inhabitants per square mile (212.4/km^{2}). There were 58 housing units at an average density of 241.7 per square mile (93.3/km^{2}). The racial makeup of the village was 93.2% White, 1.5% African American, 1.5% Native American, and 3.8% from two or more races. Hispanic or Latino of any race were 3.0% of the population.

There were 49 households, of which 34.7% had children under the age of 18 living with them, 49.0% were married couples living together, 6.1% had a female householder with no husband present, 12.2% had a male householder with no wife present, and 32.7% were non-families. 26.5% of all households were made up of individuals, and 6.1% had someone living alone who was 65 years of age or older. The average household size was 2.69 and the average family size was 3.30.

The median age in the village was 34.7 years. 28% of residents were under the age of 18; 6% were between the ages of 18 and 24; 25.7% were from 25 to 44; 28.8% were from 45 to 64; and 11.4% were 65 years of age or older. The gender makeup of the village was 55.3% male and 44.7% female.

=== 2000 census ===
As of the census of 2000, there were 96 people, 45 households, and 25 families living in the village. The population density was 407.6 people per square mile (154.4/km^{2}). There were 52 housing units at an average density of 220.8 per square mile (83.7/km^{2}). The racial makeup of the village was 100.00% White. 0.00% of the population were Hispanic or Latino of any race.

There were 45 households, out of which 24.4% had children under the age of 18 living with them, 48.9% were married couples living together, 4.4% had a female householder with no husband present, and 44.4% were non-families. 42.2% of all households were made up of individuals, and 26.7% had someone living alone who was 65 years of age or older. The average household size was 2.13 and the average family size was 3.00.

In the village, the population was spread out, with 17.7% under the age of 18, 7.3% from 18 to 24, 24.0% from 25 to 44, 27.1% from 45 to 64, and 24.0% who were 65 years of age or older. The median age was 46 years. For every 100 females, there were 95.9 males. For every 100 females age 18 and over, there were 102.6 males.

The median income for a household in the village was $27,500, and the median income for a family was $41,875. Males had a median income of $28,750 versus $21,875 for females. The per capita income for the village was $16,363. There were no families and 8.8% of the population living below the poverty line, including no under eighteens and 21.7% of those over 64.
