= Edward I. Kidd =

American politician and businessman

Edward Isaac Kidd (May 10, 1845 – February 25, 1902) was an American politician and businessman.

Born in the town of Millville, Grant County, Wisconsin, Kidd went to public school and to college. During the American Civil War, Kidd served in the 25th Wisconsin Volunteer Infantry Regiment. Kidd was in the banking business and served on the Grant County Board of Supervisors. From 1881 to 1885, Kidd served in the Wisconsin State Assembly and was a Republican. Then, Kidd served in the Wisconsin State Senate from 1885 to 1893. In 1889, Kidd moved to Prairie du Chien, Wisconsin. Kidd was president of the Prairie du Chien Bank. He also served on the Crawford County Board of Supervisors. Kidd was appointed Wisconsin State Bank Examiner and served until his death. Kidd died at his home in Prairie du Chien, Wisconsin from stomach problems.
