= John O. Wehrle =

American artist (born 1941)

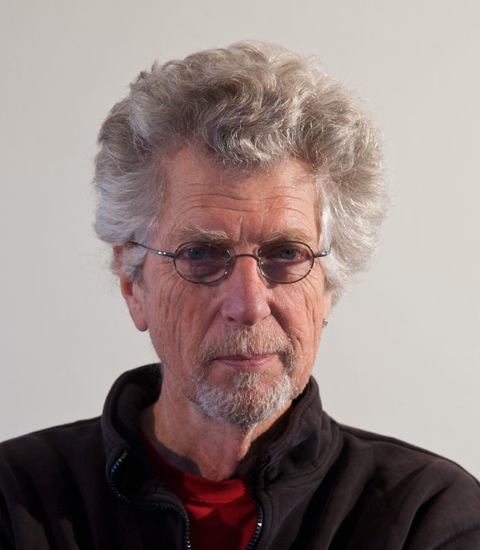
- Artist John O. Wehrle
- Born: John O. Wehrle; 1941 (age 84–85); San Antonio, Texas
- Education: Texas Tech University, Pratt Institute
- Known for: Painter
- Notable work: Fall of Icarus, mural, 1978, Venice Beach, California; Positively Fourth Street, mural, 1976, De Young Museum; Galileo Jupiter Apollo, 1983, mural for 1984 Olympic Games, no longer extant;
- Awards: Lifetime Achievement Award, Contra Costa Arts and Culture Commission

John Wehrle (born 1941 in San Antonio, Texas) is an American artist currently living in Richmond, California. Wehrle is best known as a muralist and site-specific installation artist, predominantly active in California. Proficient in painting, sculpture and photography, his work is in public and private collections. Several of his exterior mural works, Fall of Icarus, Positively Fourth Street, and Galileo Jupiter Apollo achieved underground iconic status during their existence. Wehrle's interior murals and surviving installations have been internationally collected.

== Early years and education ==
Wehrle is the son of an educator and a salesman. His father, Larry Wehrle, graduated from Texas A&M University, where he was Captain of the Aggie Band, receiving a commission in the US Army Signal Corps. He served in Europe during World War II with the Ordnance Division, promoted to Major. Upon returning to civilian life he entered the feed business in Mineola, Texas, becoming Sales Manager for progressively larger companies in different Texas cities until his retirement in 1980. Betty Wehrle, a journalism graduate from Baylor University, began a second career as an educator in the 1960s, eventually serving as a dean of El Centro College in Dallas, Texas. Both won numerous awards in their field.

Growing up in various Texas towns and cities, John Wehrle developed artistic skills to compensate for constantly being the new kid on the block. Living in Waco, Texas, as a teenager, he participated in a nationally recognized youth theater at Baylor University. Fellow students in the program included Robert Wilson, now celebrated avant-garde theater director. He attended Texas Tech University in Lubbock, Texas, where he was cartoonist for the school paper and named outstanding senior art student there. Actively showing work during his later school years, he was accepted in exhibitions of the Texas Fine Arts Association and had work purchased by the Dallas Museum of Art. At his father's insistence he was enrolled in ROTC.

== Military service and Combat Artists Program ==
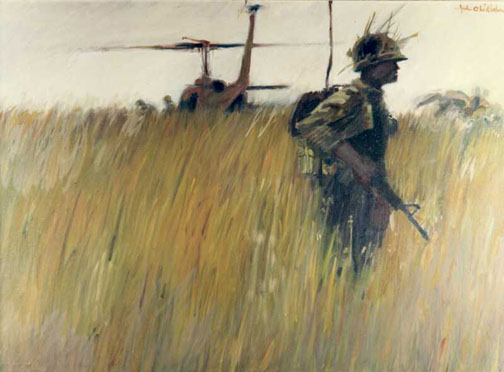
LANDING ZONE by John O. Wehrle, CAT I, 1966, Vietnam Combat Artists Program. Courtesy of the National Museum of the U.S. Army

Following graduation he was commissioned a Lieutenant in the US Army and served 22 months at Sacramento Army depot managing the Zero Defects program and the Officers club, before being chosen for the Vietnam Combat Artists Program's first Combat Art Team sent to Vietnam in July 1966. As officer in charge of Team One, he was responsible for choosing locations to visit, arranging transportation and explaining the team's mission to Public Information Officers throughout the country. Wehrle designed the unofficial combat art pin later adopted by other teams. Team One artists were : John Wehrle, Roger Blum, Paul Rickert, Robert Knight and Ronald Pepin. Felix Sanchez joined the team in Hawaii. Following two months of sketching and photographing in various provinces with different units, Team One was flown to Hawaii and given warehouse studio space at Schofield Barracks to create finished paintings of their experience for the Army's Military History Division. He then returned to Sacramento Army Depot to serve the final months of his service.

== Art career ==
After Wehrle's discharge he enrolled in a Master of Fine Arts graduate program at Pratt Institute in Brooklyn, New York. There, in collaboration with fellow students, he helped devise a multimedia theatrical experience involving film, dance, and projections in a theater designed by James Petrillo.

After graduation in 1969, Wehrle moved to San Francisco, where he taught at the De Young Museum and California College of Arts and Crafts. In 1973, he quit his teaching position to follow an opportunity to build a wilderness log cabin in Montana. After a winter in Whiskey Gulch, he returned to the Bay Area, where he worked as a baker and carpenter for a brief time. He was hired under the comprehensive Employees Training Act in 1974 to work, once again, at the De Young Museum. Here Wehrle devised and painted his first exterior mural EB-1942, a 16x 48 oil painting on panels drawn from his Montana experiences.

During this project, he met painter John Rampley and together they designed and painted the second mural Positively Fourth Street in the De Young staff parking lot in 1976. Wehrle describes the inspiration for this painting as the result of being stuck in rush hour traffic on the 101 freeway approach to the Bay Bridge.

Following this period of relative stability Wehrle resumed his nomadic existence, moving between Montana and Los Angeles. In 1978 he received a California Arts Council grant to paint Fall of Icarus on a 20x90 foot wall in Venice Beach'. During this period, he met other members of the Los Angeles mural movement, Terry Schoonhoven, Vic Henderson, Art Mortimer, Kent Twitchell and Judy Baca. After painting a private commission for movie producer Carl Borack on his residence in Beverly Hills, Wehrle moved back to Bay Area. There he painted Ancisco, on the wall of a Berkeley bakery, the first of many projects still extant in California.

In 1980, scientists Tom White and Kary Mullis commissioned Wehrle to paint a mural for their biotech lab at newly formed Cetus Corporation. After completing and installing Return of Jonah, Cetus CEO, Ron Cape commissioned Wehrle to paint …paging Dr. Crick in situ at their Berkeley Headquarters. Subsequently, these paintings were transferred, along with the furniture, to Chiron Corporation; later Novartis bought the company. The paintings have now been moved to the Novartis corporate collection in Switzerland, no longer viewable by the general public. Kary Mullis later won the Nobel Prize for his discovery of Polymerase chain reaction. An image of Return of Jonah serves as the home page header of the PCR website and is also used as the cover of Paul Rabinow's entertaining story of Cetus's scientific milieu, Making PCR.

In 1983, Wehrle was chosen as one of 10 official muralists for the 1984 Summer Olympic Games in Los Angeles. These were the first artworks that Caltrans allowed directly on the freeway. Richard Wyatt, Alonzo Davis, Judy Baca, Kent Twitchell Glenna Boltuch, Roderick Sykes, Terry Schoonhoven, Willie Heron, Frank Romero, and John Wehrle were each commissioned to decorate retaining walls on the 110 and 101 freeways connecting the Olympic venues. The works survived until the mid-1990s, when graffiti tagging took its toll on the public works. In 2004 the state of California funded restoration of some of the murals including Wehrle's 207-foot mural Galileo, Jupiter, Apollo. Subsequent vandalism caused Caltrans to paint over the artworks, substituting smaller digital prints on their previous locations. After a 2013 vote by the Los Angeles City Council on lifting a ban against mural painting, the Mural Conservancy of Los Angeles (MCLA), in cooperation with Caltrans, began to restore the work.

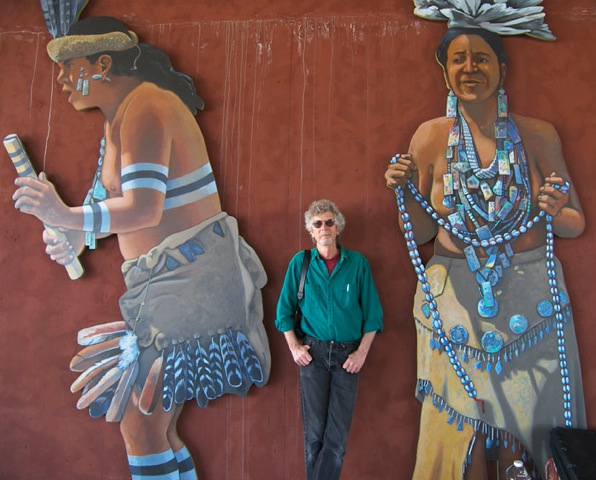
John O. Wehrle stands between figures of his mural Mak Roote at the Berkeley Transit Plaza in Berkeley, California

During the 1980s, Wehrle exhibited work with Koplin Gallery. This led to a commission Knockout for Kate Mantilini Restaurant, a modern-day roadhouse on Wilshire and Doheney in Los Angeles, designed by Morphosis architects for owner Marilyn Lewis. The building was given a Progressive Architecture Award and architect Thom Mayne later won the Pritzker Prize. Wehrle also completed War and Peace TV a 14-unit installation of hand crafted wooden TV sculptures containing die-cut outlines of iconic images of the Vietnam War including a helicopter and the Pulitzer Prize-winning photograph of the execution of a Viet Cong suspect. He again used the TV format in a piece titled Saigon Rotomatic Managua that contained a figure of a Viet Cong that revolved to reveal the face of a Sandanista. These were exhibited in various venues including an exhibit entitled The War Room at the Intersection for the Arts gallery in San Francisco, culminating in A Different War, a national traveling exhibition, curated by Lucy Lippard.

During the 1990s, Wehrle accomplished a number of corporate and civic commissions including banks, libraries, shopping malls and convention centers. Scribes, a visual narrative installation integrated throughout Los Angeles’ Mid Valley Public Library, received an award of excellence from that city. He began painting the first of a series of freeway overpass mural gateways for the City of Richmond. Wehrle continued exhibiting at galleries and art centers in San Francisco and Los Angeles. He had a Djerassi residency in 1998.

Since 2000, Wehrle has worked steadily on public art projects, primarily on the West Coast of the United States. He has been creating murals and gateways for the cities of Richmond, Hayward, Dublin, and Pinole, alongside interior installations for Ocean View Library, Encino Fire Station #83 and other California locations. He received a grant from the Maxwell H. Gluck Foundation to create a series of nine murals depicting important scientific discoveries and contributions to the fine arts of alumnae of the University of California, Riverside. In 2007 he produced Neptune’s Ghost, a time blended painting of historic Neptune Beach and present day shoppers in Alameda, California, (which was removed as of 2018). Other works include Mak Roote, a landmark installation for Berkeley Transit Plaza. Featuring poetic words by Betsy Davids and images by Wehrle that include native Ohlone, union railroad porters, writer Chiori Santiago and humanitarian clown Wavy Gravy, the work was given an award by the city of Berkeley. Recent works include installations in public schools for Washington State Arts Commission, murals for Richmond's City Council Chambers and the newly restored Richmond Plunge.

In 2003, Wehrle worked under art supervisor Kurt Wold to create murals with inmates at Vacaville State Prison and painted with Daniel Galvez and John Pugh four extensive murals under Dublin, California, overpasses. He has served on Richmond, California’s public art advisory committee and board of directors of the Richmond Art Center.

In 2006, Wehrle was given a lifetime achievement award by AC5, Contra Costa’s Arts and Culture Commission. Later in 2018, he was proclaimed the "greatest single contributor to public art murals in Richmond" by the Richmond City Council.

In November 2011, Wehrle presented "Rising Tide: A Post-Cautionary Tale, a Work in Progress" as artist-in-residence at the De Young Museum in San Francisco, California.

"Time & Tide", a retrospective of Wehrle's work across his career, showed at the Richmond Art Center in spring 2025.

== Image gallery ==
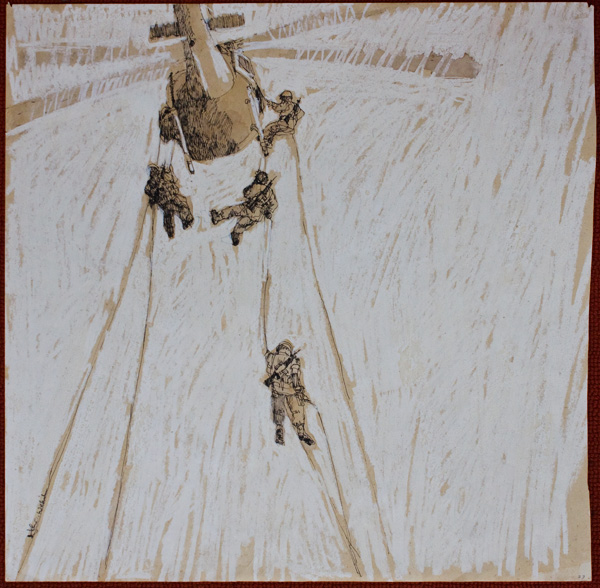
Rappeling Vietnam Combat Artists Program CAT 1, 1966.

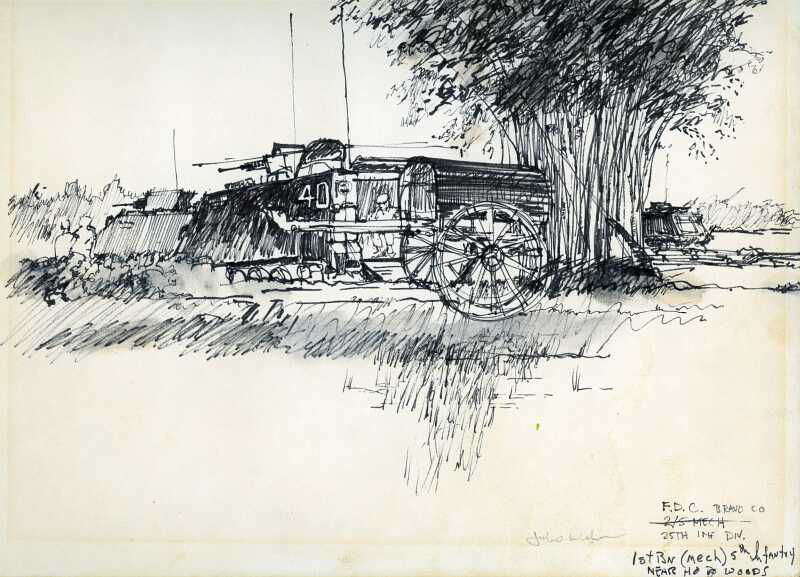
FDC Bravo Company, 25th Infantry Division Vietnam Combat Artists Program CAT 01, 1966.

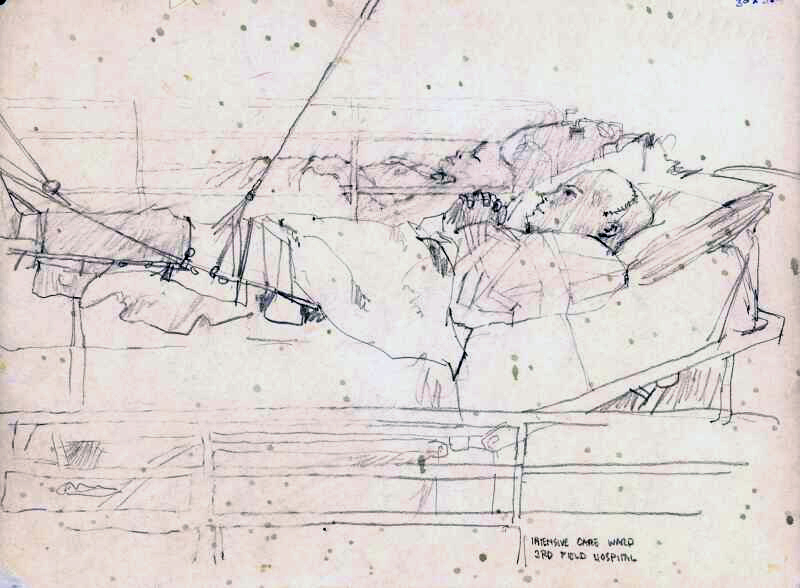
Intensive Care Ward, 3rd Field Hospital, RVN Vietnam Combat Artists Program CAT 1, 1966.

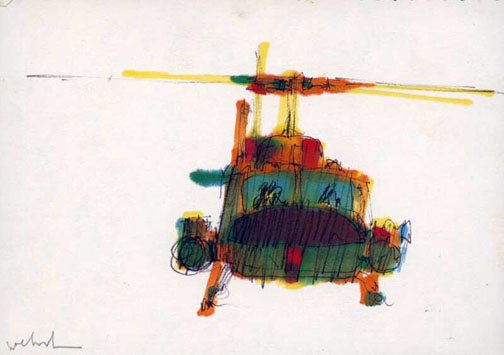
Gunship Vietnam Combat Artists Program CAT 1, 1966.

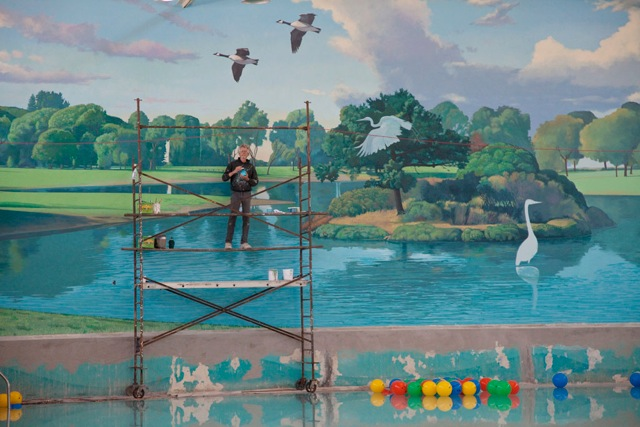
John O. Wehrle painting a mural for the Richmond Plunge in Richmond, CA.

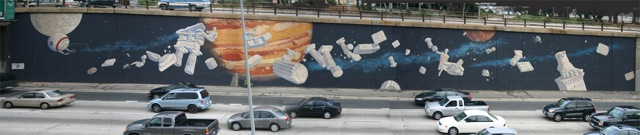
Galileo, Jupiter, Apollo mural painted for the 1984 Summer Olympic Games in Los Angeles, CA.

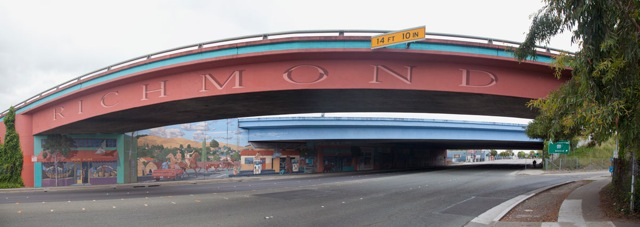
Gateway and Mural painted for the city of Richmond, CA.

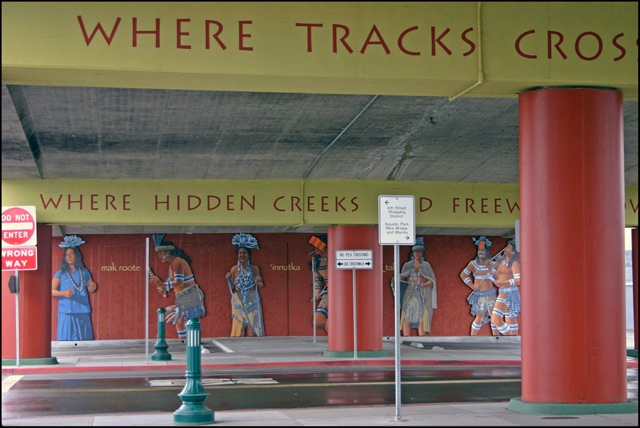
Mak Roote painted for the Berkeley Transit Plaza in Berkeley, CA.

== See also ==
- Vietnam Combat Artists Program
