= Werley, Wisconsin =

- Unincorporated community
- Location within Wisconsin Location within the United States
- Coordinates: 43°01′10″N 90°45′55″W
- Country: United States
- State: Wisconsin
- County: Grant
- Town: Mount Ida
- Elevation: 771 ft (235 m)
- Time zone: UTC-6 (Central (CST))
  - Summer (DST): UTC-5 (CDT)
- Area code: 608
- GNIS feature ID: 1577875

Werley is an unincorporated community in the town of Mount Ida, Grant County, Wisconsin, United States, at latitude 43.019 and longitude -90.765, where Star Lane feeds into County Road K, roughly five miles west-northwest of Fennimore.

There used to be a narrow gauge railway run by the Chicago and Northwestern Railway which ran nearby.

Werley was named after local settler and legislator Gottlieb Wehrle, whose name was pronounced "Werley" by the local residents. The community used to be called Climbing Rock.
