= John Brindley =

American politician

John Brindley (April 18, 1850 – February 11, 1926) was an American jurist and politician.

Born on a farm near Boscobel, Grant County, Wisconsin, Brindley graduated from University of Wisconsin in 1874. He was principal of grade and high schools in Lone Rock. Lancaster, and Boscobel, Wisconsin. In 1879 and 1880, Brindley served in the Wisconsin State Assembly and was a Republican. In 1880, Brindley moved to La Crosse, Wisconsin and practiced law. He was the La Crosse city attorney. From 1897 until his death in 1926, Brindley served as county judge for La Crosse. Brindley died in La Crosse after a long illness.
