= Ipswich, Wisconsin =

- Unincorporated community
- Location within Wisconsin Location within the United States
- Coordinates: 42°42′27″N 90°24′37″W
- Country: United States
- State: Wisconsin
- County: Lafayette
- Town: Elk Grove
- Elevation: 1,033 ft (315 m)
- Time zone: UTC-6 (Central (CST))
  - Summer (DST): UTC-5 (CDT)
- Area code: 608
- GNIS feature ID: 1577658

Ipswich is an unincorporated community located in the town of Elk Grove, Lafayette County, Wisconsin, United States.

== History ==
A post office called Ipswich was established in 1886, and remained in operation until it was discontinued in 1921. The community was named after the town of Ipswich in England via Ipswich, Massachusetts.
