= Wingville, Wisconsin =

Town of Wingville
- Town
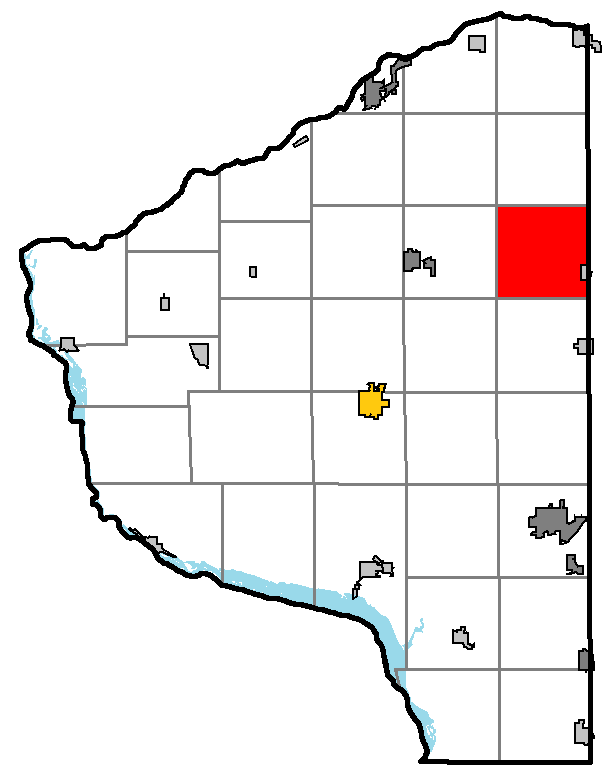
- Location of the Town of Wingville within Grant County, Wisconsin

- Location of Grant County, Wisconsin
- Coordinates: 42°59′30″N 90°29′30″W
- Country: United States
- State: Wisconsin
- County: Grant

Area
  - Total: 35.5 sq mi (91.9 km^{2})
  - Land: 35.4 sq mi (91.8 km^{2})
  - Water: 0 sq mi (0.0 km^{2})
- Elevation: 1,102 ft (336 m)

Population (2020)
  - Total: 378
  - Density: 10.7/sq mi (4.12/km^{2})
- Time zone: UTC-6 (Central (CST))
  - Summer (DST): UTC-5 (CDT)
- Area code: 608
- FIPS code: 55-87800
- GNIS feature ID: 1584456

The Town of Wingville is located in northeastern Grant County, Wisconsin, United States. The population was 378 at the 2020 census. The unincorporated community of Centerville is located in the town. The unincorporated community of Preston is also located partially in the town.

== Geography ==
According to the United States Census Bureau, the town has a total area of 35.5 square miles (91.9 km^{2}), of which 35.5 square miles (91.8 km^{2}) is land and 0.03% is water.

== Demographics ==
At the 2000 census there were 394 people, 126 households, and 100 families living in the town. The population density was 11.1 people per square mile (4.3/km^{2}). There were 136 housing units at an average density of 3.8 per square mile (1.5/km^{2}). The racial makeup of the town was 98.22% White, 0.25% African American, 0.25% Asian, 1.02% from other races, and 0.25% from two or more races. Hispanic or Latino of any race were 1.02%.

Of the 126 households 43.7% had children under the age of 18 living with them, 73.0% were married couples living together, 2.4% had a female householder with no husband present, and 20.6% were non-families. 15.1% of households were one person and 6.3% were one person aged 65 or older. The average household size was 3.13 and the average family size was 3.56.

The age distribution was 35.8% under the age of 18, 5.3% from 18 to 24, 26.4% from 25 to 44, 20.8% from 45 to 64, and 11.7% 65 or older. The median age was 33 years. For every 100 females, there were 120.1 males. For every 100 females age 18 and over, there were 130.0 males.

The median household income was $30,893 and the median family income was $30,357. Males had a median income of $24,375 versus $22,188 for females. The per capita income for the town was $12,733. About 10.6% of families and 17.3% of the population were below the poverty line, including 28.9% of those under age 18 and none of those age 65 or over.

== Notable people ==
- John J. Blaine, Governor of Wisconsin and U.S. Senator
- Samuel Abbott Ferrin, member of Wisconsin State Assembly
