= Rewey, Wisconsin =

Village in the United States

- Village
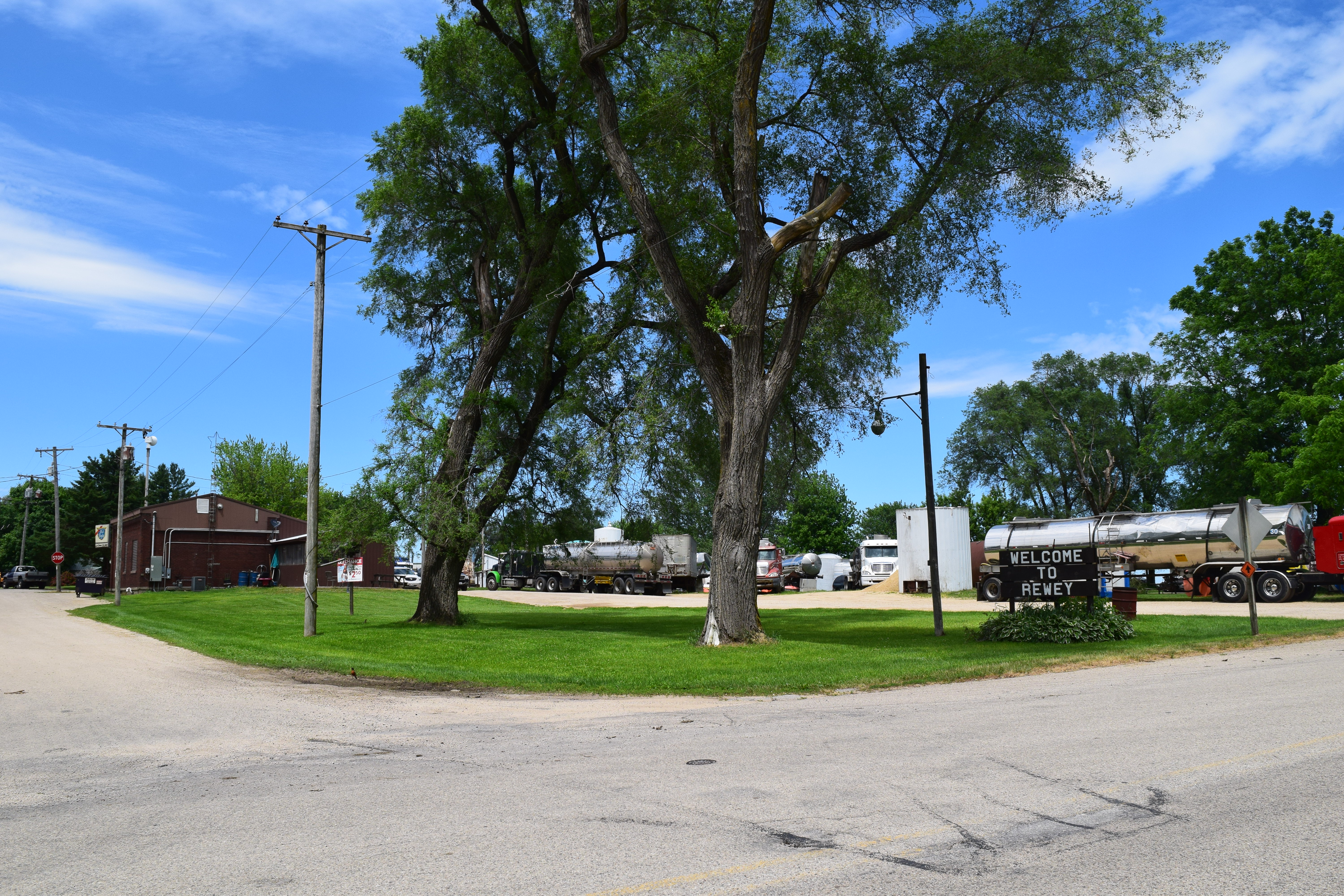

- Location of Rewey in Iowa County, Wisconsin.
- Coordinates: 42°50′34″N 90°23′47″W
- Country: United States
- State: Wisconsin
- County: Iowa

Area
  - Total: 0.51 sq mi (1.31 km^{2})
  - Land: 0.51 sq mi (1.31 km^{2})
  - Water: 0 sq mi (0.00 km^{2})
- Elevation: 1,129 ft (344 m)

Population (2020)
  - Total: 258
  - Density: 510/sq mi (197/km^{2})
- Time zone: UTC-6 (Central (CST))
  - Summer (DST): UTC-5 (CDT)
- Area code: 608
- FIPS code: 55-67100
- GNIS feature ID: 1572225

Rewey is a village in Iowa County, Wisconsin, United States. The population was 258 at the 2020 census. It is part of the Madison Metropolitan Statistical Area.

== History ==
A post office called Rewey has been in operation since the village was platted in 1880. The community was named for J. W. Rewey, the owner of the original town site.

== Geography ==
Rewey is located at 42°50′34″N 90°23′47″W (42.842679, -90.396486).

According to the United States Census Bureau, the village has a total area of 0.50 square miles (1.29 km^{2}), all land.

== Demographics ==
Historical population
Census	Pop.	Note	%±
1910	329		—
1920	324		−1.5%
1930	249		−23.1%
1940	267		7.2%
1950	252		−5.6%
1960	219		−13.1%
1970	232		5.9%
1980	233		0.4%
1990	220		−5.6%
2000	311		41.4%
2010	292		−6.1%
2020	258		−11.6%
U.S. Decennial Census

=== 2010 census ===
As of the census of 2010, there were 292 people, 119 households, and 73 families living in the village. The population density was 584.0 inhabitants per square mile (225.5/km^{2}). There were 129 housing units at an average density of 258.0 per square mile (99.6/km^{2}). The racial makeup of the village was 99.7% White and 0.3% Native American.

There were 119 households, of which 39.5% had children under the age of 18 living with them, 41.2% were married couples living together, 14.3% had a female householder with no husband present, 5.9% had a male householder with no wife present, and 38.7% were non-families. 31.9% of all households were made up of individuals, and 7.6% had someone living alone who was 65 years of age or older. The average household size was 2.45 and the average family size was 3.14.

The median age in the village was 35 years. 30.1% of residents were under the age of 18; 9.2% were between the ages of 18 and 24; 23.9% were from 25 to 44; 25.3% were from 45 to 64; and 11.3% were 65 years of age or older. The gender makeup of the village was 48.3% male and 51.7% female.

=== 2000 census ===
As of the census of 2000, there were 311 people, 118 households, and 71 families living in the village. The population density was 626.8 people per square mile (240.2/km^{2}). There were 128 housing units at an average density of 258.0 per square mile (98.8/km^{2}). The racial makeup of the village was 96.46% White, 0.32% Native American, and 3.22% from two or more races. Hispanic or Latino of any race were 0.32% of the population.

There were 118 households, out of which 35.6% had children under the age of 18 living with them, 47.5% were married couples living together, 9.3% had a female householder with no husband present, and 39.0% were non-families. 30.5% of all households were made up of individuals, and 8.5% had someone living alone who was 65 years of age or older. The average household size was 2.64 and the average family size was 3.49.

In the village, the population was spread out, with 32.8% under the age of 18, 10.0% from 18 to 24, 29.9% from 25 to 44, 15.8% from 45 to 64, and 11.6% who were 65 years of age or older. The median age was 30 years. For every 100 females, there were 90.8 males. For every 100 females age 18 and over, there were 90.0 males.

The median income for a household in the village was $24,643, and the median income for a family was $28,333. Males had a median income of $25,714 versus $23,333 for females. The per capita income for the village was $12,298. About 5.9% of families and 10.6% of the population were below the poverty line, including 5.2% of those under age 18 and 16.7% of those age 65 or over.
