= Montfort, Wisconsin =

- Village
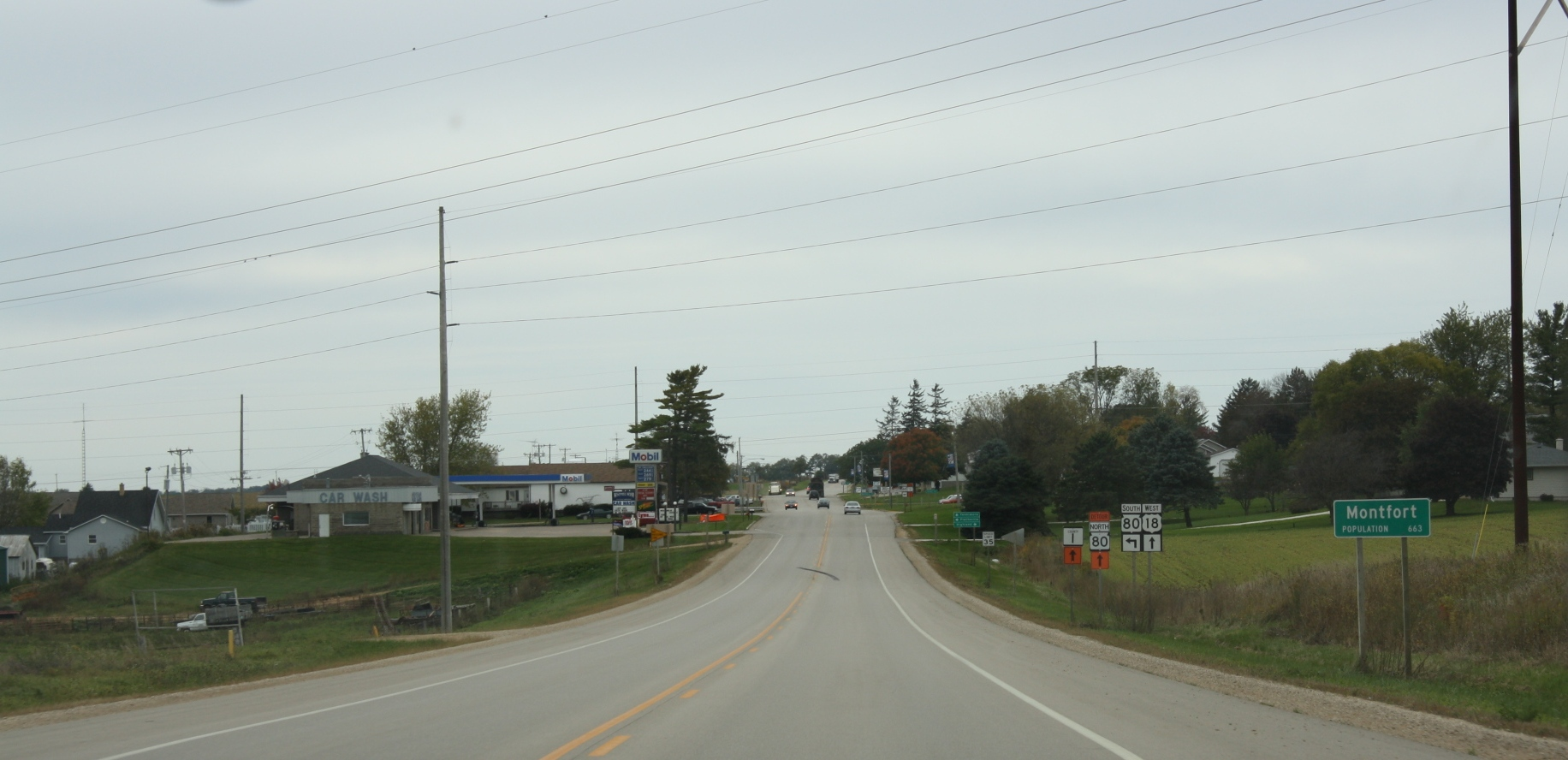
- Looking west at Montfort

- Location of Montfort in Grant County, Wisconsin.
- Coordinates: 42°58′17″N 90°25′59″W
- Country: United States
- State: Wisconsin
- Counties: Grant, Iowa
- Incorporated: 1893

Area
  - Total: 0.54 sq mi (1.39 km^{2})
  - Land: 0.54 sq mi (1.39 km^{2})
  - Water: 0 sq mi (0.00 km^{2})
- Elevation: 1,109 ft (338 m)

Population (2020)
  - Total: 705
  - Density: 1,310/sq mi (507/km^{2})
- Time zone: UTC-6 (Central (CST))
  - Summer (DST): UTC-5 (CDT)
- Area code: 608
- FIPS code: 55-53950
- GNIS feature ID: 1569677
- Website: https://villageofmontfort.com/

Montfort is a village in Grant and Iowa Counties in the U.S. state of Wisconsin. The population was 705 at the 2020 census. Of which, 633 lived in Grant County, while 72 lived in Iowa County.

The Iowa County portion of Montfort is part of the Madison, Wisconsin metropolitan area, while the Grant County portion is part of the Platteville Micropolitan Statistical Area.

== History ==
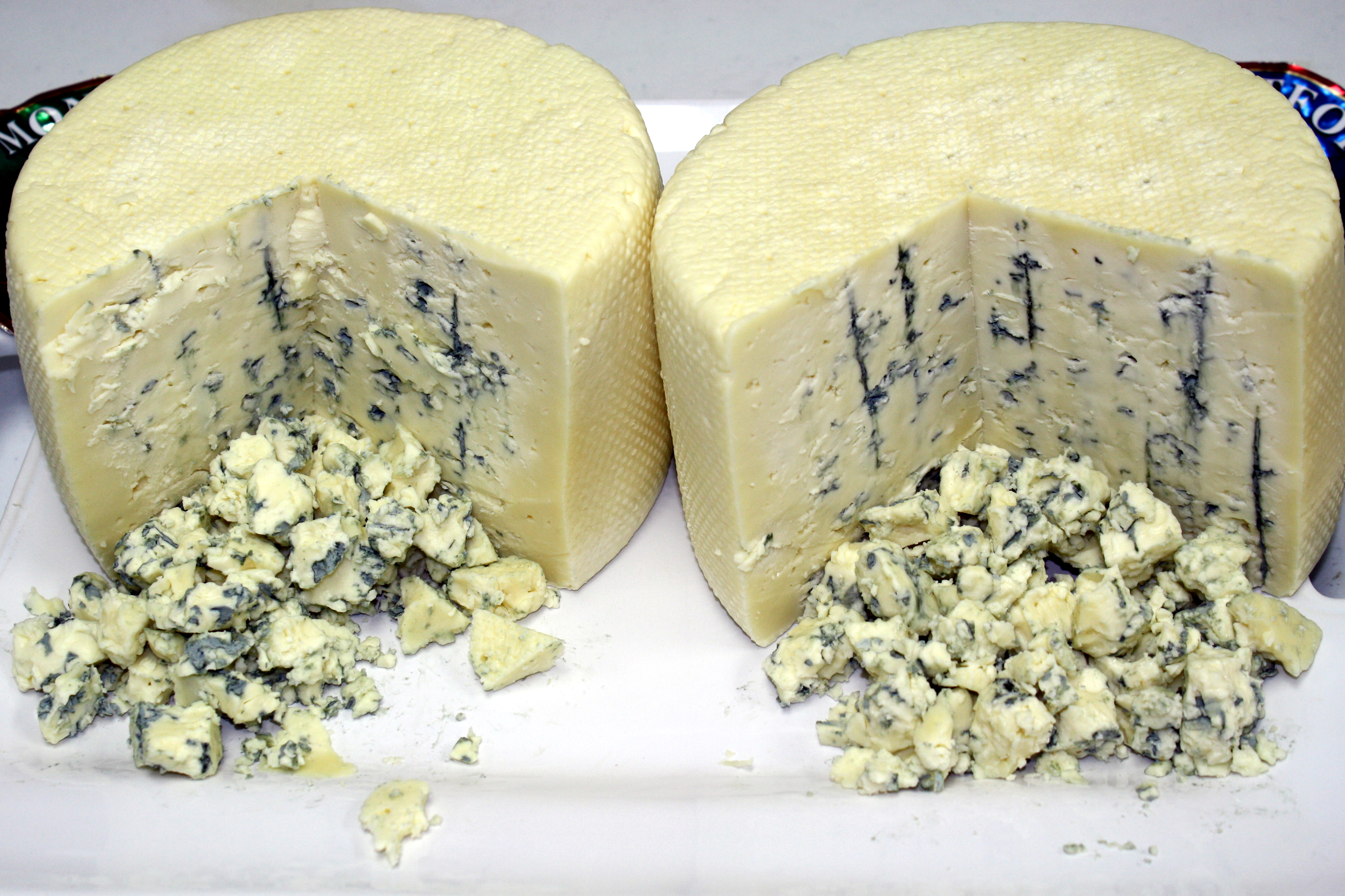
Award-winning Montforte blue cheese made in Montfort, USDA 2013

Montfort was named from an old fort situated on a nearby hill. The site of the village was first platted and laid out on April 3, 1848, by Ben C. Eastman and Francis J. Dunn, who owned much of the land in this area of the town of Wingville. There were about 125 residents at the time of the plat. It was operated as an unincorporated settlement until it was formally incorporated as a village in 1893. The population remained quite small until the first railroad reached Montfort in 1879. It was struck by a tornado on July 28, 1885, but only one home was destroyed.

The Wisconsin Farmers Union Specialty Cheese Company in Montfort produces the award-winning Montforte Blue Cheese.

== Geography ==
Montfort is located at 42°58′17″N 90°25′59″W (42.971399, -90.432937). It is bounded on the west, north, and south, by the town of Wingville, Wisconsin, and is bounded on the east by the town of Highland, Iowa County, Wisconsin.

According to the United States Census Bureau, the village has a total area of 0.54 square miles (1.40 km^{2}), all land.

=== Adjacent municipalities ===
- Town of Wingville (west, north, and south)
- Town of Highland (east)

== Demographics ==
Historical population
Census	Pop.	Note	%±
1880	64		—
1890	407		535.9%
1900	627		54.1%
1910	558		−11.0%
1920	598		7.2%
1930	554		−7.4%
1940	615		11.0%
1950	576		−6.3%
1960	538		−6.6%
1970	518		−3.7%
1980	616		18.9%
1990	676		9.7%
2000	663		−1.9%
2010	718		8.3%
2020	705		−1.8%
2023 (est.)	715	▲	1.4%
U.S. Decennial Census

=== 2010 census ===
As of the census of 2010, there were 718 people, 279 households, and 192 families living in the village. The population density was 1,329.6 inhabitants per square mile (513.4/km^{2}). There were 298 housing units at an average density of 551.9 per square mile (213.1/km^{2}). The racial makeup of the village was 98.6% White, 0.8% African American, and 0.6% from other races. Hispanic or Latino of any race were 1.3% of the population.

There were 279 households, of which 34.1% had children under the age of 18 living with them, 53.8% were married couples living together, 10.0% had a female householder with no husband present, 5.0% had a male householder with no wife present, and 31.2% were non-families. 22.2% of all households were made up of individuals, and 10% had someone living alone who was 65 years of age or older. The average household size was 2.56 and the average family size was 2.98.

The median age in the village was 35.9 years. 24.8% of residents were under the age of 18; 10.5% were between the ages of 18 and 24; 24.5% were from 25 to 44; 28.3% were from 45 to 64; and 11.8% were 65 years of age or older. The gender makeup of the village was 50.6% male and 49.4% female.

=== 2000 census ===
At the 2000 census, there were 663 people, 252 households and 179 families living in the village. The population density was 1,252.1 per square mile (483.0/km^{2}). There were 273 housing units at an average density of 515.6 per square mile (198.9/km^{2}). The racial makeup of the village was 99.25% White, 0.15% African American, and 0.60% from two or more races.

There were 252 households, of which 37.7% had children under the age of 18 living with them, 55.2% were married couples living together, 11.5% had a female householder with no husband present, and 28.6% were non-families. 23.0% of all households were individuals, and 13.5% had someone living alone who was 65 years of age or older. The average household size was 2.63 and the average family size was 3.12.

In terms of age distribution, 30.3% were under the age of 18, 8.3% from 18 to 24, 26.2% from 25 to 44, 20.5% from 45 to 64, and 14.6% were 65 years of age or older. The median age was 36 years. For every 100 females, there were 95.6 males. For every 100 females age 18 and over, there were 87.0 males.

The median income for a household in the village was $37,500, and the median income for a family was $43,295. Males had a median income of $28,125 versus $21,442 for females. The per capita income for the village was $16,126. About 1.7% of families and 5.7% of the population were below the poverty line, including 4.7% of those under age 18 and 7.1% of those age 65 or over.
