= Gottlieb Wehrle =

American politician

Member of the Wisconsin State Assembly from the Grant 3rd district
- In office January 5, 1874 – January 4, 1875
- Preceded by: John Monteith
- Succeeded by: Benjamin M. Coates

Personal details
- Born: March 14, 1822 Grand Duchy of Baden, German Confederation
- Died: July 31, 1886 (aged 64) Fennimore, Wisconsin, U.S.
- Resting place: Fennimore, Wisconsin
- Party: Democratic; Liberal Rep. (1873)
- Occupation: Farmer
- Known for: Namesake of Werley, Wisconsin

Gottlieb Wehrle (March 14, 1822 – July 31, 1886) was a German American immigrant, farmer, and pioneer of Grant County, Wisconsin. He served one term in the Wisconsin State Assembly, representing Grant County 3rd Assembly district in the 27th Wisconsin Legislature (1874). He is the namesake of the unincorporated community Werley, Wisconsin, in Grant County.

== Background ==
Wehrle was born in the Grand Duchy of Baden, Germany, on March 14, 1822. He received a common school education and became a farmer. He came to the United States on March 10, 1854, in steerage, having embarked in Le Havre, eventually moved to Wisconsin in 1855 and settled on a farm in Fennimore. Wehrle died in 1886 and was buried in Fennimore.

== Public office ==
He was twice elected chairman of the Fennimore town board, before being elected to the Assembly in 1873 on the Reform ticket (in the same election which brought William Robert Taylor to power), with 584 votes to 530 for Republican former Assemblyman Jonathan Baker Moore. (The incumbent, Republican John Monteith, was not a candidate for re-election.) He was assigned to the standing committee on education.

In 1874 he sought re-election as a Democrat, but lost by 645 votes to 838 for former Republican Assemblyman Benjamin M. Coates.

== Heritage ==
The unincorporated community of Werley, Wisconsin was named after him.
