= Countryman (surname) =

Countryman is a surname. Notable people with the surname include:

- B. W. Countryman (1867–1946), American politician
- Carl Countryman (1946–2006), American audio engineer
- Dana Countryman (born 1954), American electronic musician
- Dayton Countryman (1918–2011), American politician
- Edward Countryman (1944–2025), American historian
- Gratia Countryman (1866–1953), American librarian
- Kaylee Countryman (born 2010), American racing driver
- John R. Countryman (1933–2024), American child actor, and career officer for the United States Foreign Service
- Peter J. Countryman (1942–1992), American social activist and civil rights leader
- Rick Countryman (born 1957), American jazz saxophonist
- Robbie Countryman, American television director
- Thomas M. Countryman (born 1957), American diplomat
- Vern Countryman (1917–1999), American legal scholar
