= Glen Haven =

Glen Haven may refer to:

- Glen Haven, Alberta
- Glen Haven, Nova Scotia
- Glen Haven, Colorado
- Glen Haven, Michigan
- Glen Haven, New York
- Glen Haven, Wisconsin, a town
- Glen Haven (CDP), Wisconsin, an unincorporated community
