= Hickory Grove =

Hickory Grove may refer to several places in the United States:

- Hickory Grove, Alabama
- Hickory Grove, Arkansas
- Hickory Grove Township, Indiana
- Hickory Grove, Iowa
- Hickory Grove, Kentucky
- Hickory Grove, Mississippi
- Hickory Grove, New York
- Hickory Grove, North Carolina
- Hickory Grove, Ohio
- Hickory Grove, Pennsylvania
- Hickory Grove, South Carolina
- Hickory Grove, Tennessee
- Hickory Grove, Virginia
- Hickory Grove, West Virginia
- Hickory Grove, Hampshire County, West Virginia
- Hickory Grove (Romney, West Virginia), a historic house
- Hickory Grove, Wisconsin, a town
- Hickory Grove, Grant County, Wisconsin, an unincorporated community
- Hickory Grove, Manitowoc County, Wisconsin, an unincorporated community
