= Countryman =

Countryman may refer to:

== Arts and media ==
- Countryman (album), an album by Willie Nelson
- Countryman (film), a motion picture set in Jamaica
- Countryman (magazine), a British magazine
- Countryman (newspaper), a rural-themed newspaper in Western Australia
- Countryman (skitz album), an album by DJ Skitz

== Other uses ==
- Countryman, a brand of microphones designed by Carl Countryman
- Countryman (surname)
- Mini Countryman, a car
- Operation Countryman, an investigation into police corruption in the Greater London area, UK

== See also ==
- Countrymen, a 2021 Franco-Norwegian TV series written and directed by Izer Aliu
