= Thomas B. Larkin =

US Army general (1890–1968)

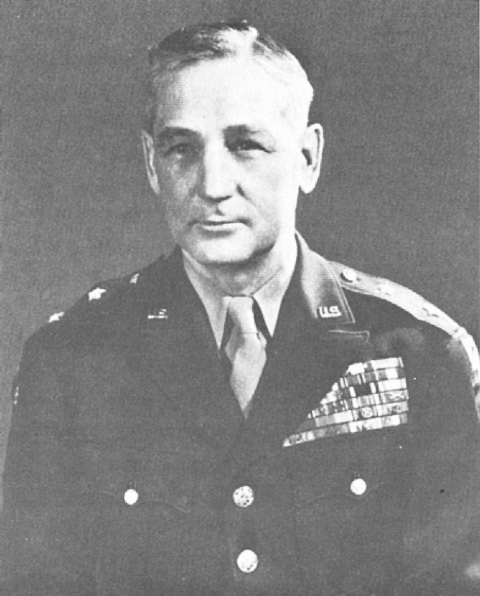
- Born: December 12, 1890; Louisburg, Wisconsin
- Died: October 17, 1968 (aged 77) Washington, D.C.
- Buried: Arlington National Cemetery
- Allegiance: United States of America
- Branch: United States Army
- Service years: 1915–1952
- Rank: Lieutenant general
- Commands: Services of Supply, North African Theater of Operations; Southern Line of Communications, European Theater of Operations; Quartermaster Corps
- Awards: Distinguished Service Medal; Silver Star; Legion of Merit; Bronze Star

Lieutenant General Thomas Bernard Larkin (December 15, 1890 – October 17, 1968) was a military officer who served as the 32nd Quartermaster General of the United States Army.

== Early life ==
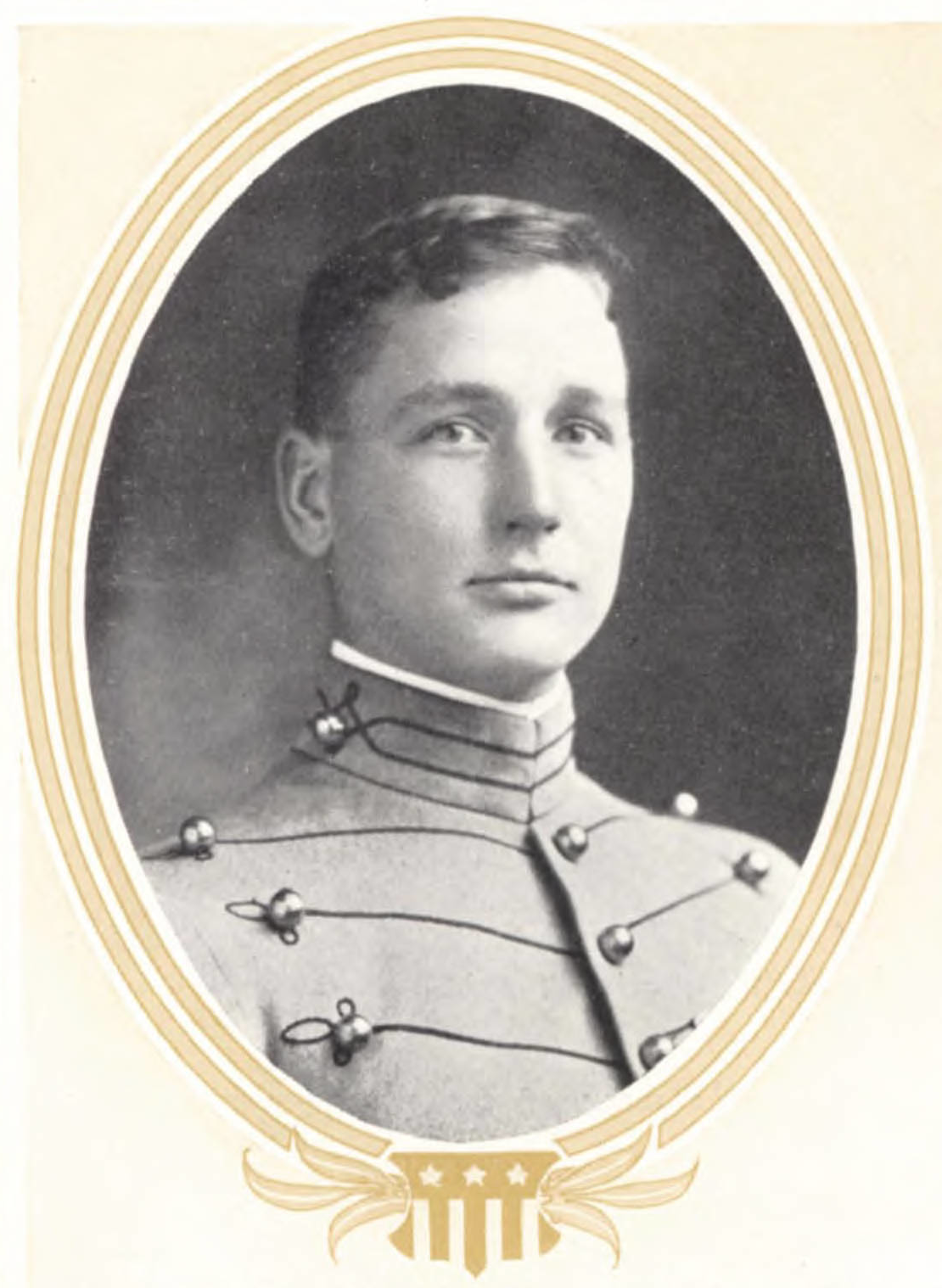
Larkin as a West Point cadet in 1915

Larkin was born in Louisburg, Wisconsin and attended the Gonzaga University in Spokane, Washington. In 1915 he graduated from the US Military Academy at West Point ("the class the stars fell on") and was sent to Mexico in 1916 with the 2nd Engineers. After returning to the US he graduated in 1917 from the Engineer School at Washington Barracks, Washington, D.C. and in December was sent to France. He was awarded the Silver Star for his reconnaissance efforts during the Second Battle of the Marne during July 1918.

From 1921 to 1923 he served as the Assistant Military Attache for the American Embassy in Tokyo, Japan. In 1927 he graduated from the Army Industrial College; in 1929 from the Command and General Staff School at Fort Leavenworth, Kansas; and in 1938 from the Army War College.

== Marriage and children ==
Larkin married Mary Irwin. She was the daughter of William, a United States Navy commander, and Elizabeth Irwin. One of their sons, Harrison S. Larkin, was a first lieutenant in the United States Air Force and was killed when his plane crashed on April 28, 1950. The Larkin Conference Center at Fort Lee was named for Lieutenant Larkin. Another son, Thomas B. Larkin Jr., was a lieutenant in the United States Navy. All four Larkins, as well as the Irwins, are buried at Arlington National Cemetery.

Through the Irwins, Larkin was also a relative of Rear Admiral Harold Percival Norton, also buried at Arlington.

== Military career ==
Larkin served a tour of duty in the Panama Canal Zone as Supervisory Engineer in charge of Third Locks Project, and as Special Assistant to the Governor of the Canal Zone in charge of special civil defense.

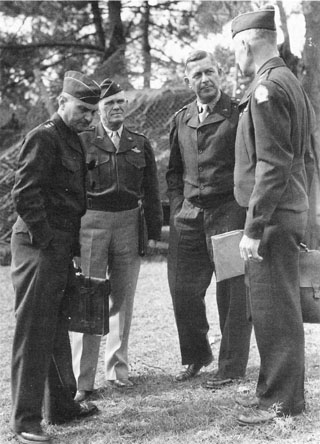
Lieutenant General Ira C. Eaker, Major General John K. Cannon, Lieutenant General Jacob L. Devers, and Major General Thomas B. Larkin, 1944

After the Attack on Pearl Harbor, he was personally selected by Major General John C. H. Lee in May 1942 to serve as Chief of Staff, Headquarters, Services of Supply, United States Army Forces in the British Isles. He served under Lee in the opening months of the Operation Bolero buildup in Britain, until (USMA classmate) Lt. Gen. Dwight D. Eisenhower requested he be detached for Operation Torch, the invasion of North Africa, beginning on 8 November 1942. In February 1943 he became Commanding General, Services of Supply, North African Theater of Operations, United States Army, and later Commander for the Communications Zone in North Africa, and continued in this role through the invasions of Sicily, Italy, and then southern France in August 1944. For his efforts in supplying the combat troops during the Tunisian campaign he was awarded the Distinguished Service Medal in June 1943. He was also awarded an Oak Leaf Cluster to the Distinguished Service Medal in November 1944 for his support of the 5th Army in Italy, and his role in planning the invasion of southern France. He remained in this capacity for the Operation Dragoon France invasion, and served under Lt. Gen. Jacob L. Devers, who took over in January 1944, in the now-larger Mediterranean Theater of Operations until the fall of Nazi Germany.

On February 1, 1946, he became Quartermaster General of the US Army, serving in this position until March 20, 1949. He retired with grade of lieutenant general in 1952.

Larkin died at Walter Reed Army Hospital on October 17, 1968, and was buried at Arlington National Cemetery.

== Awards and decorations ==
Larkin was the recipient of numerous awards including the Distinguished Service Medal with two Oak Leaf Clusters, Silver Star, Legion of Merit, Bronze Star, Mexican Campaign Medal, World War I Victory Medal, World War I Occupation Medal, American Defense Medal, American Campaign Medal; European, African, Middle East Campaign Medal, World War II Victory Medal, and World War II Occupation Medal.

Foreign decorations: French Croix de Guerre with Palm, the Brazilian Order of Military Merit, the Order of the Crown of Italy (Grand Order), the British Order of the Bath Companion, and the Polish Gold Cross with Sword.
