= Ellenboro =

Ellenboro may refer to:

United States

- Ellenboro, North Carolina
- Ellenboro, West Virginia
- Ellenboro, Wisconsin, a town
- Ellenboro (community), Wisconsin, an unincorporated community
