= Rufus M. Day =

American politician

Rufus Morgan Day (November 18, 1835 – May 20, 1909) was an American farmer and politician.

Born in West Liberty, Morgan County, Kentucky, Day moved with his family to Lancaster, Grant County, Wisconsin Territory in 1840. He then settled on a farm, in Mount Hope, Wisconsin, in 1866. During the American Civil War, Day served in the 20th Wisconsin Volunteer Infantry Regiment. Day served on the Mount Hope Town Board and the Grant County Board of Supervisors. In 1885 and 1887, Day served in the Wisconsin State Assembly and was a Republican. Day died at his home in Mount Hope, Wisconsin.
