= Daniel Raymond Burt =

American politician

Daniel Raymond Burt February 29, 1804 – January 7, 1884) was an American legislator and businessman.

Born in Florida, New York, in Montgomery County, New York, he moved to Ontario in 1826 and then to Tecumseh, Michigan, in 1830. He married Lydia Ashley (1805–1864) in 1831. Burt then moved to Wisconsin Territory settling in the town of Waterloo, in Grant County, Wisconsin, in 1835, where he developed roads, gristmills, and sawmills. The unincorporated community of Burton, Wisconsin, in the town of Waterloo, was platted and named for him. He served in the Wisconsin Territorial Legislature from 1840 to 1842 and 1847 to 1848 as a Whig. Burt then moved to Dunleith, Illinois (now East Dubuque, Illinois), in 1856, where he started the Burt Machine Company, which produced agricultural machinery. He married his second wife, Mary J. Ennor, in 1866. Burt died on January 7, 1884, in Wenona, Illinois, and was buried in East Dubuque, Illinois.
