= Admiral Norton =

Admiral Norton may refer to:

- Harold Percival Norton (1855–1933), U.S. Navy rear admiral
- James Norton (admiral) (1789–1835), English-born Imperial Brazilian Navy rear admiral
- Nancy A. Norton (born 1964), U.S. Navy vice admiral
- Peter Hill-Norton (1915–2004), Royal Navy admiral of the fleet
- Stanley C. Norton (1894–1978), U.S. Navy rear admiral
