= Liberty, Grant County, Wisconsin =

Liberty, Wisconsin
- Town
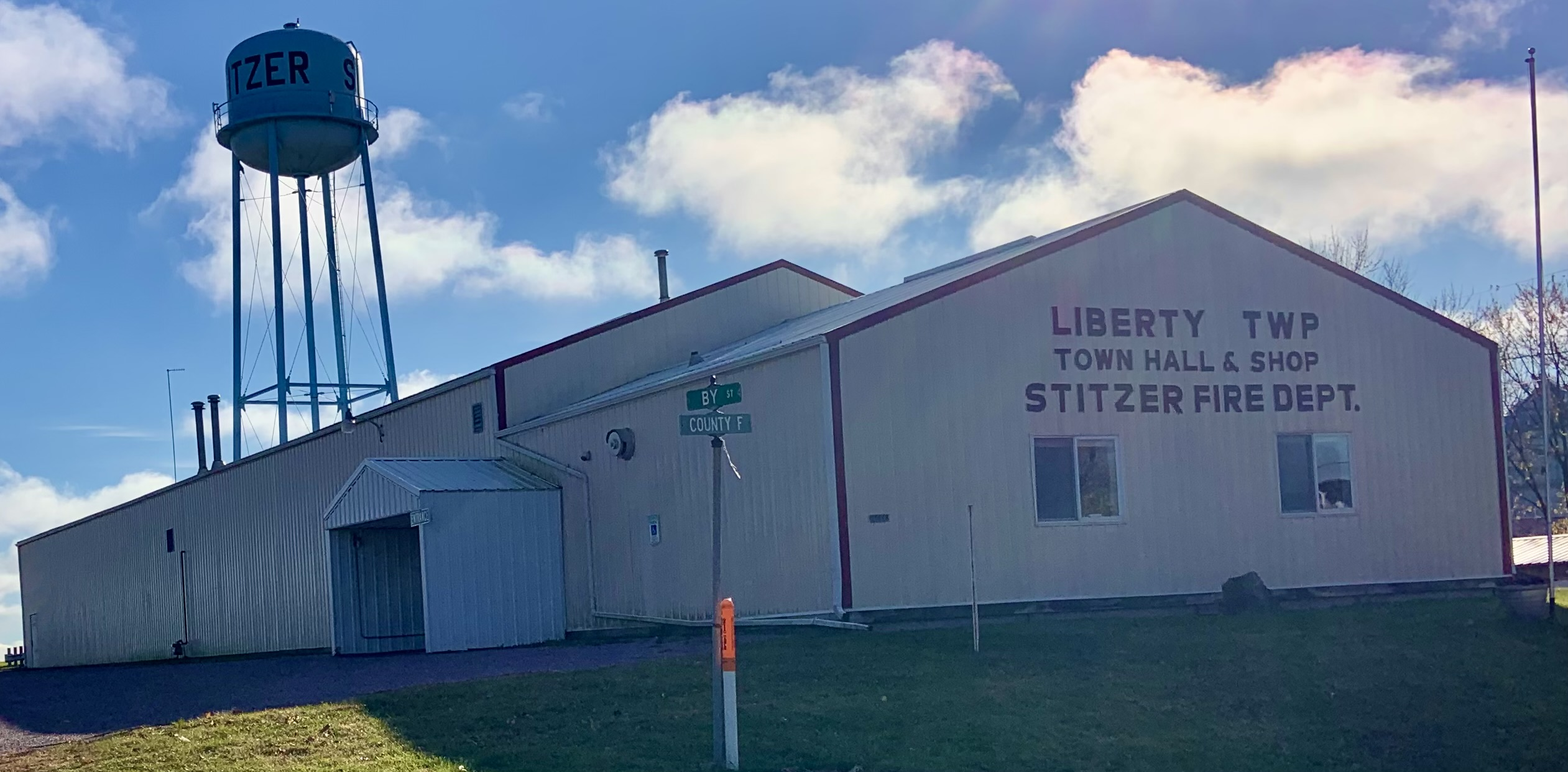
- Liberty Town Hall in Stitzer

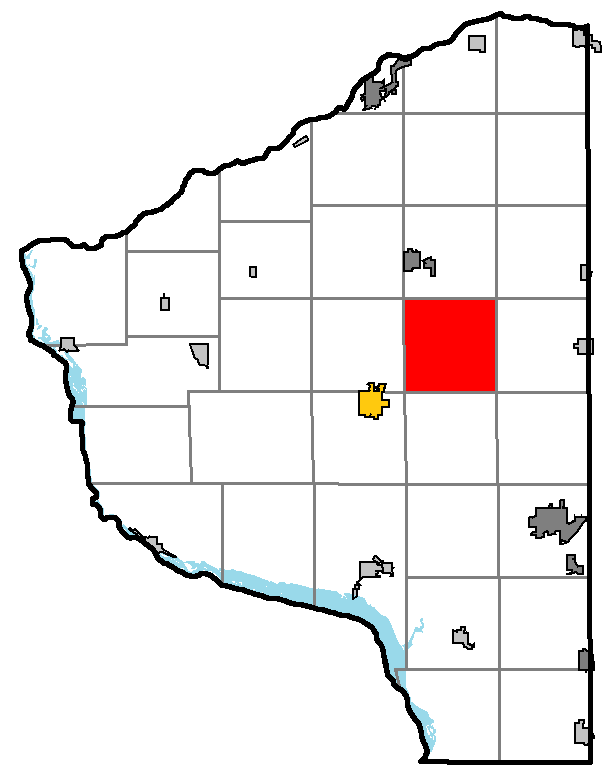
- Location of Liberty within Grant County, Wisconsin

- Location of Grant County in Wisconsin
- Coordinates: 42°53′38″N 90°36′32″W
- Country: United States
- State: Wisconsin
- County: Grant

Area
  - Total: 36.5 sq mi (94.5 km^{2})
  - Land: 36.5 sq mi (94.5 km^{2})
  - Water: 0 sq mi (0.0 km^{2})
- Elevation: 945 ft (288 m)

Population (2020)
  - Total: 543
  - Density: 14.9/sq mi (5.75/km^{2})
- Time zone: UTC-6 (Central (CST))
  - Summer (DST): UTC-5 (CDT)
- Area code: 608
- FIPS code: 55-43825
- GNIS feature ID: 1583550

Liberty is a town in Grant County, Wisconsin, United States. The population was 543 at the 2020 census. The unincorporated community of Stitzer, Wisconsin is in the town. The town was named from the American ideal of liberty.

== Geography ==
According to the United States Census Bureau, the town has a total area of 36.5 square miles (94.5 km^{2}), all land.

== Demographics ==
As of the census of 2000, there were 552 people, 189 households, and 147 families living in the town. The population density was 15.1 people per square mile (5.8/km^{2}). There were 204 housing units at an average density of 5.6 per square mile (2.2/km^{2}). The racial makeup of the town was 99.28% White, 0.54% African American, 0.18% from other races. Hispanic or Latino of any race were 1.09% of the population.

There were 189 households, out of which 41.3% had children under the age of 18 living with them, 69.8% were married couples living together, 4.2% had a female householder with no husband present, and 22.2% were non-families. 19.6% of all households were made up of individuals, and 7.9% had someone living alone who was 65 years of age or older. The average household size was 2.92 and the average family size was 3.37.

In the town, the population was spread out, with 32.8% under the age of 18, 6.5% from 18 to 24, 28.3% from 25 to 44, 22.6% from 45 to 64, and 9.8% who were 65 years of age or older. The median age was 34 years. For every 100 females, there were 111.5 males. For every 100 females age 18 and over, there were 105.0 males.

The median income for a household in the town was $37,000, and the median income for a family was $44,688. Males had a median income of $23,068 versus $23,750 for females. The per capita income for the town was $15,560. About 12.1% of families and 16.3% of the population were below the poverty line, including 20.2% of those under age 18 and 13.7% of those age 65 or over.
