= Mount Hope (town), Wisconsin =

Town in Grant County, Wisconsin, United States

Mount Hope, Wisconsin
- Town of Mount Hope
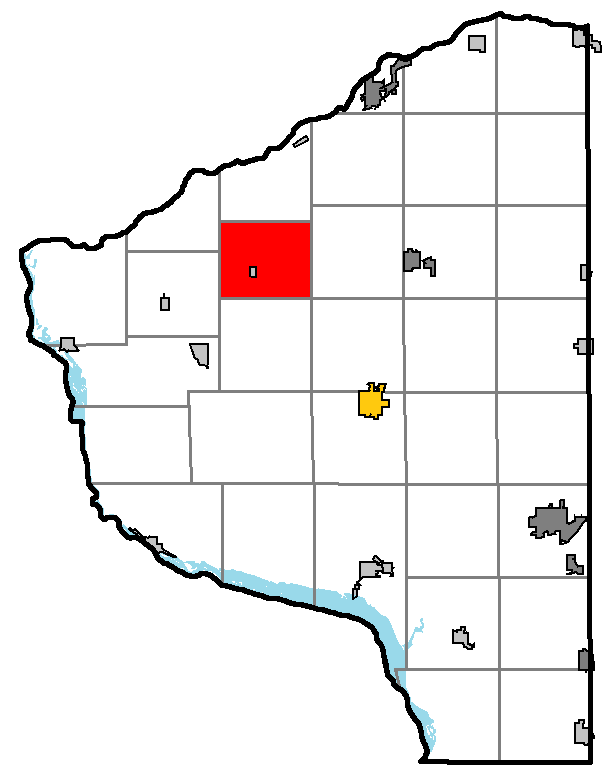
- Location of Mount Hope in Grant County, Wisconsin

- Location of Grant County, Wisconsin
- Coordinates: 42°58′54″N 90°50′37″W
- Country: United States
- State: Wisconsin
- County: Grant

Area
  - Total: 29.83 sq mi (77.3 km^{2})
  - Land: 29.83 sq mi (77.3 km^{2})
  - Water: 0 sq mi (0 km^{2})

Population (2020)
  - Total: 282
  - Density: 9.45/sq mi (3.65/km^{2})
- Time zone: Central (CST)
- ZIP Code: 53816
- Area code(s): 608 and 353
- GNIS feature ID: 1583762

The Town of Mount Hope is a town in Grant County, Wisconsin, United States. The population was 282 at the 2020 census. The village of Mount Hope and the unincorporated community of Shady Dell are located in the town.

== Geography ==
According to the United States Census Bureau, the town has a total area of 29.9 square miles (77.4 km^{2}), all land.

== Demographics ==
At the 2000 census, there were 225 people, 84 households, and 60 families living in the town. The population density was 7.5 per square mile (2.9/km^{2}). There were 92 housing units at an average density of 3.1 per square mile (1.2/km^{2}). The racial makeup of the town was 99.56% White, and 0.44% from two or more races. 0.00% of the population were Hispanic or Latino of any race.

There were 84 households, of which 29.8% had children under the age of 18 living with them, 65.5% were married couples living together, 3.6% had a female householder with no husband present, and 27.4% were non-families. 20.2% of all households were made up of individuals, and 10.7% had someone living alone who was 65 years of age or older. The average household size was 2.68 and the average family size was 3.18.

25.3% of the population were under the age of 18, 6.7% from 18 to 24, 28.9% from 25 to 44, 27.1% from 45 to 64, and 12.0% who were 65 years of age or older. The median age was 40 years. For every 100 females, there were 106.4 males. For every 100 females age 18 and over, there were 118.2 males.

The median household income was $35,000, and the median family income was $38,750. Males had a median income of $27,500 versus $22,500 for females. The per capita income for the town was $18,442. About 11.0% of families and 9.7% of the population were below the poverty line, including 3.9% of those under the age of 18 and 15.6% of those 65 or over.
