= Rutledge, Wisconsin =

- Unincorporated community
- Location within Wisconsin Location within the United States
- Coordinates: 42°33′17″N 90°38′01″W
- Country: United States
- State: Wisconsin
- County: Grant
- Town: Jamestown
- Elevation: 614 ft (187 m)
- Time zone: UTC-6 (Central (CST))
  - Summer (DST): UTC-5 (CDT)
- Area code: 608
- GNIS feature ID: 1577804

Rutledge is an unincorporated community located in the town of Jamestown, Grant County, Wisconsin, United States.
