= Watterstown, Wisconsin =

- Town
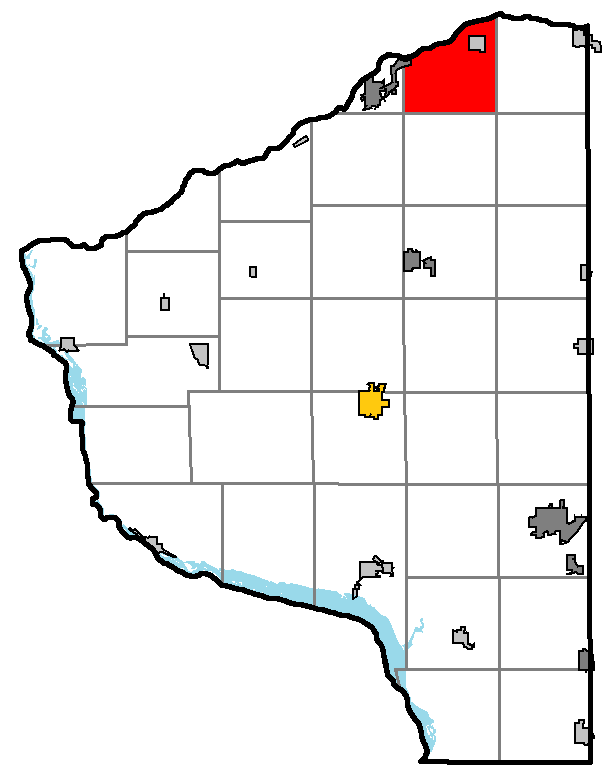
- Location of Watterstown within Grant County, Wisconsin

- Location of Grant County, Wisconsin
- Coordinates: 43°9′49″N 90°35′40″W
- Country: United States
- State: Wisconsin
- County: Grant

Area
  - Total: 28.8 sq mi (74.5 km^{2})
  - Land: 27.7 sq mi (71.8 km^{2})
  - Water: 1.0 sq mi (2.7 km^{2})
- Elevation: 735 ft (224 m)

Population (2020)
  - Total: 372
  - Density: 13.4/sq mi (5.18/km^{2})
- Time zone: UTC-6 (Central (CST))
  - Summer (DST): UTC-5 (CDT)
- Area code: 608
- FIPS code: 55-84075
- GNIS feature ID: 1584368

Watterstown is a town in Grant County, Wisconsin, United States. The population was 372 at the 2020 census.

== Geography ==
According to the United States Census Bureau, the town has a total area of 28.8 square miles (74.5 km^{2}), of which 27.7 square miles (71.8 km^{2}) is land and 1.0 square mile (2.7 km^{2}) (3.61%) is water.

== Demographics ==
At the 2000 census there were 362 people, 134 households, and 99 families living in the town. The population density was 13.1 people per square mile (5.0/km^{2}). There were 171 housing units at an average density of 6.2 per square mile (2.4/km^{2}). The racial makeup of the town was 96.13% White, 0.28% Native American, 3.31% Asian, and 0.28% from two or more races. Of the 134 households 35.8% had children under the age of 18 living with them, 61.9% were married couples living together, 4.5% had a female householder with no husband present, and 25.4% were non-families. 21.6% of households were one person and 9.7% were one person aged 65 or older. The average household size was 2.70 and the average family size was 3.07.

The age distribution was 28.2% under the age of 18, 8.8% from 18 to 24, 24.9% from 25 to 44, 25.1% from 45 to 64, and 13.0% 65 or older. The median age was 40 years. For every 100 females, there were 114.2 males. For every 100 females age 18 and over, there were 109.7 males.

The median household income was $41,806 and the median family income was $44,107. Males had a median income of $27,500 versus $21,771 for females. The per capita income for the town was $15,726. About 11.5% of families and 14.3% of the population were below the poverty line, including 15.7% of those under age 18 and 23.1% of those age 65 or over.
