= Stitzer, Wisconsin =

- Unincorporated community
- Location within Wisconsin Location within the United States
- Coordinates: 42°55′36″N 90°37′23″W
- Country: United States
- State: Wisconsin
- County: Grant
- Town: Liberty
- Time zone: UTC-6 (Central (CST))
  - Summer (DST): UTC-5 (CDT)
- ZIP code: 53825
- Area code: 608

Stitzer is an unincorporated community in the town of Liberty in Grant County, Wisconsin, United States.

== History ==
A post office called Stitzer has been in operation since 1879. The community was named for Bernard Stizer, a local farmer.

== In popular culture ==
Wisconsin-native comedian Chris Farley appeared on The Tonight Show with Jay Leno in 1996, playing a character "Cheddar McFarley", who was said to be the mayor alternatively of either Stitzer or "Cheeseopolis", on a night when Super Bowl XXXI champions Andre Rison, Edgar Bennett and Dwight Sean Jones of the Green Bay Packers were being interviewed by Leno. Wearing a Reggie White No. 92 jersey, Farley presented the three players with cheesehead hats.
