= Sandy Hook, Wisconsin =

Census-designated place in Wisconsin, United States

- Census-designated place
- Location within Wisconsin Location within the United States
- Coordinates: 42°32′36″N 90°36′36″W
- Country: United States
- State: Wisconsin
- County: Grant
- Town: Jamestown

Area
  - Total: 1.398 sq mi (3.62 km^{2})
  - Land: 1.398 sq mi (3.62 km^{2})
  - Water: 0 sq mi (0 km^{2})
- Elevation: 879 ft (268 m)

Population (2020)
  - Total: 293
  - Density: 210/sq mi (80.9/km^{2})
- Time zone: UTC-6 (Central (CST))
  - Summer (DST): UTC-5 (CDT)
- Zip: 53822
- Area code: 608
- GNIS feature ID: 1573720

Sandy Hook is a census-designated place in the town of Jamestown, Grant County, Wisconsin, United States. Its population was 293 as of the 2020 census, up from 185 at the 2010 census.
