= British Hollow, Wisconsin =

- Unincorporated community
- Location within Wisconsin Location within the United States
- Coordinates: 42°42′21″N 90°41′12″W
- Country: United States
- State: Wisconsin
- County: Grant
- Town: Potosi
- Elevation: 823 ft (251 m)
- Time zone: UTC-6 (Central (CST))
  - Summer (DST): UTC-5 (CDT)
- Area code: 608
- GNIS feature ID: 1562221

British Hollow is an unincorporated community originally located in the northeastern corner of the Town of Potosi, Grant County, Wisconsin, United States.

== History ==
The first white residents were Terence Coyle and his family, who built a cabin there and were in permanent occupancy by the spring of 1832. In 1836, when Grant County was organized, it was made a separate precinct from the rest of Potosi, and named Pleasant Valley, a name which it still held at the time of the passage of the original (1848) Constitution of Wisconsin. The etymology of the name "British Hollow" is unclear; it may have been to distinguish this settlement from the nearby Dutch Hollow, whose inhabitants were primarily Germans in origin.

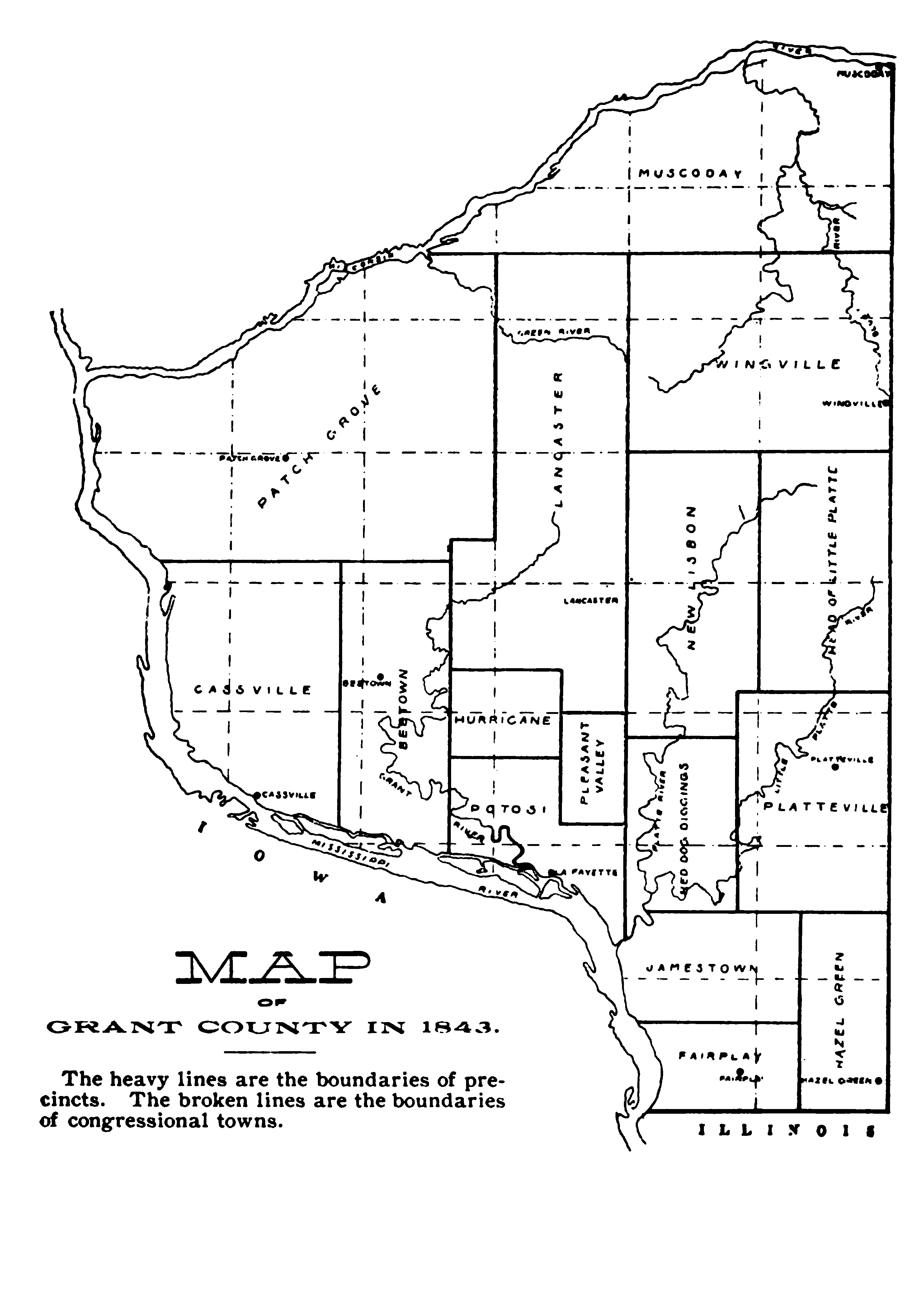
Map showing the "precinct" of Pleasant Valley and others, and the town ("congressional townships") boundaries in 1843

At one time British Hollow (sometimes shortened to British) (which by 1848 also included most of Harrison, Grant County, Wisconsin and the north half of Paris, Grant County, Wisconsin townships) had several stores, a brewery (which went out of business about 1885), and a hotel. The old "precinct" was abolished by 1860; and by 1900, British Hollow had declined to one store (with post office), one church, one school, and three saloons.
