= Sinnipee, Wisconsin =

- Ghost town
- Location within Wisconsin Location within the United States
- Coordinates: 42°34′31″N 90°39′25″W
- Country: United States
- State: Wisconsin
- County: Grant
- Town: Jamestown
- Elevation: 892 ft (272 m)

Sinnipee (also called Sinipee) is a former settlement in Grant County, Wisconsin, United States. Sinnipee was a port community on the Mississippi River at the mouth of the Sinnipee Creek; it played a significant role in the lead trade. The community was first settled prior to 1832 by Payton Vaughan of North Carolina and was founded by the Sinnipee Company in 1835. A hotel called the Old Stone House opened in the community in 1839; both US president Zachary Taylor and Confederate president Jefferson Davis stayed at the hotel during its operation. The community suffered a flood and an outbreak of fever in 1840, which hurt the town's businesses; all but two families left Sinnipee, and by 1859, only one building remained in the town's business district. After a fire, the hotel was dismantled to build a dam on the Mississippi River. The community was located in the town of Jamestown. In 1934, the site of the community was flooded due to the construction of Lock and Dam No. 11 on the Mississippi.
