= Louisburg, Wisconsin =

- Unincorporated community
- Location within the state of Wisconsin Louisburg (the United States)
- Coordinates: 42°34′45″N 90°33′20″W
- Country: United States
- State: Wisconsin
- County: Grant
- Town: Jamestown
- Time zone: UTC-6 (Central (CST))
  - Summer (DST): UTC-5 (CDT)
- Area code: 608
- GNIS feature ID: 1568698

Louisburg is an unincorporated community in Grant County, Wisconsin, United States, located within the town of Jamestown. The zipcode is 53807. Louisburg Creek flows through the area.

Louisburg is located 1.5 miles east of Kieler, 2.5 miles southeast of Dickeyville, eight miles west of Cuba City and 10 miles northeast of Dubuque, Iowa. There are approximately 30 residences and seven rental properties in Louisburg which are home to an estimated 110 people.

== Notable people ==
- Thomas B. Larkin, United States Army officer
