= Jamestown, Wisconsin =

Town of Jamestown
- Town
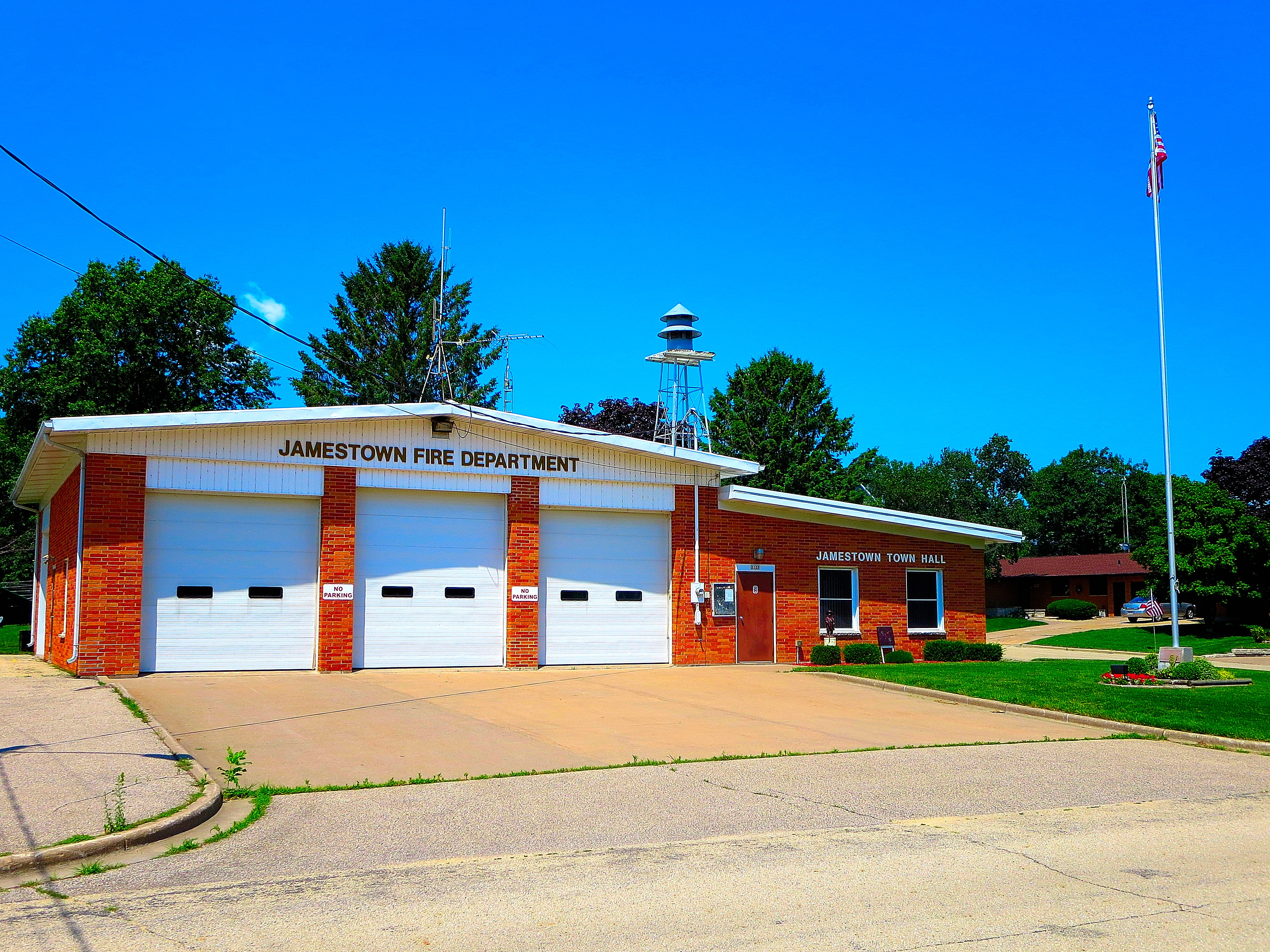
- Town hall and fire department

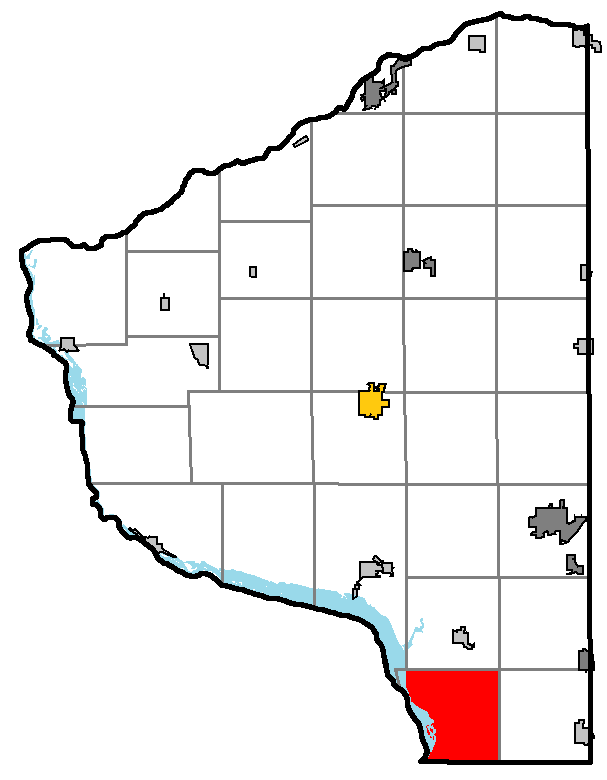
- Location of Jamestown in Grant County, Wisconsin

- Location of Grant County in Wisconsin
- Coordinates: 42°33′24″N 90°35′33″W
- Country: United States
- State: Wisconsin
- County: Grant

Area
  - Total: 32.7 sq mi (84.7 km^{2})
  - Land: 30.1 sq mi (77.9 km^{2})
  - Water: 2.6 sq mi (6.8 km^{2})
- Elevation: 863 ft (263 m)

Population (2020)
  - Total: 2,181
  - Density: 72.5/sq mi (28.0/km^{2})
- Time zone: UTC-6 (Central (CST))
  - Summer (DST): UTC-5 (CDT)
- Area code: 608
- FIPS code: 55-37800
- GNIS feature ID: 1583447
- Website: https://jamestownkieler.com/

The Town of Jamestown is located in Grant County, Wisconsin, United States. The population was 2,181 at the 2020 census. The census-designated places of Kieler and Sandy Hook and the unincorporated communities of Fair Play, Louisburg, and Rutledge are located within the town; The unincorporated community of Sinsinawa is located partially in the town. The ghost town of Sinnipee was located in the town.

== Geography ==
According to the United States Census Bureau, the town has a total area of 32.7 square miles (84.7 km^{2}), of which 30.1 square miles (77.9 km^{2}) is land and 2.6 square miles (6.8 km^{2}) (8.01%) is water.

== Demographics ==
As of the census of 2000, there were 2,077 people, 753 households, and 598 families living in the town. The population density was 69.1 people per square mile (26.7/km^{2}). There were 773 housing units at an average density of 25.7 per square mile (9.9/km^{2}). The racial makeup of the town was 98.99% White, with three African Americans, one Native American, two Asians, one from other races, and thirteen from two or more races. Seven were Hispanic or Latino of any race.

There were 753 households, out of which 35.1% had children under the age of 18 living with them, 70.4% were married couples living together, 5.7% had a female householder with no husband present, and 20.5% were non-families. 15.9% of all households were made up of individuals, and 5.7% had someone living alone who was 65 years of age or older. The average household size was 2.76 and the average family size was 3.10.

The population was 27.1% under the age of 18, 7.7% from 18 to 24, 26.4% from 25 to 44, 27.4% from 45 to 64, and 11.4% who were 65 years of age or older. The median age was 39 years. For every 100 females, there were 103 males. For every 100 females age 18 and over, there were 103 males.

The median income for a household in the town was $45,625, and the median income for a family was $49,844. Males had a median income of $32,935 versus $21,944 for females. The per capita income for the town was $18,733. About 2.1% of families and 2.3% of the population were below the poverty line, including 1.3% of those under age 18 and 6.5% of those age 65 or over.
