= Mount Hope, Wisconsin =

- Village
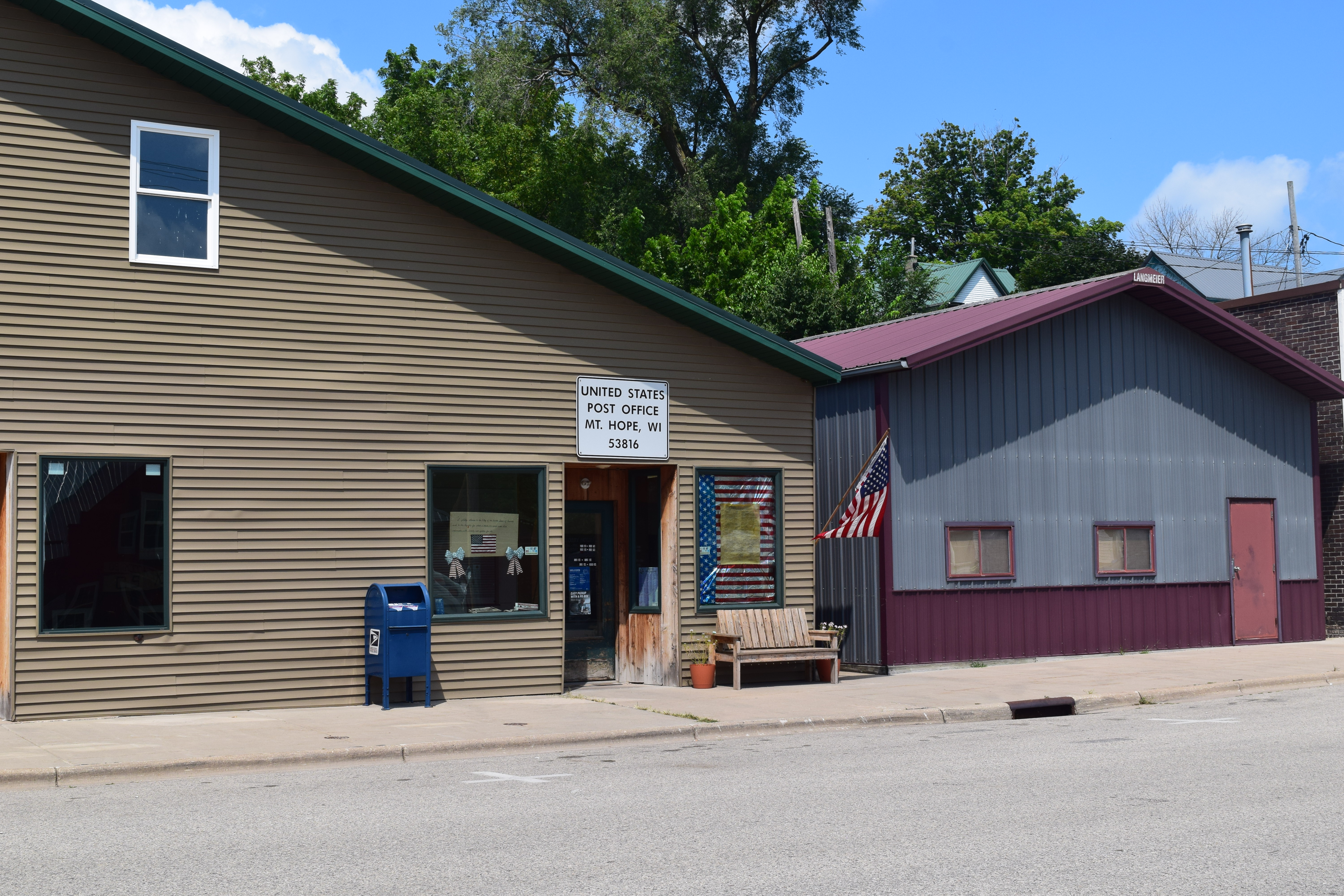
- Mount Hope post office

- Location of Mount Hope in Grant County, Wisconsin.
- Coordinates: 42°58′51″N 90°50′4″W
- Country: United States
- State: Wisconsin
- County: Grant

Government
  - Village President: Judy Hazen

Area
  - Total: 0.28 sq mi (0.72 km^{2})
  - Land: 0.28 sq mi (0.72 km^{2})
  - Water: 0 sq mi (0.00 km^{2})
- Elevation: 1,047 ft (319 m)

Population (2020)
  - Total: 215
  - Density: 770/sq mi (300/km^{2})
- Time zone: UTC-6 (Central (CST))
  - Summer (DST): UTC-5 (CDT)
- Area code: 608
- FIPS code: 55-54700
- GNIS feature ID: 1583762

Mount Hope is a village in Grant County, Wisconsin, United States. The population was 215 at the 2020 census. The village is located within the Town of Mount Hope.

== Geography ==
Mount Hope is located at 42°58′4″N 90°51′31″W (42.967871, -90.858694).

According to the United States Census Bureau, the village has a total area of 0.31 square miles (0.80 km^{2}), all land.

== Demographics ==
Historical population
Census	Pop.	Note	%±
1880	75		—
1920	215		—
1930	256		19.1%
1940	256		0.0%
1950	232		−9.4%
1960	218		−6.0%
1970	176		−19.3%
1980	197		11.9%
1990	173		−12.2%
2000	186		7.5%
2010	225		21.0%
2020	215		−4.4%
U.S. Decennial Census

=== 2010 census ===
At the 2010 census, there were 225 people, 92 households and 51 families living in the village. The population density was 725.8 per square mile (280.2/km^{2}). There were 98 housing units at an average density of 316.1 per square mile (122.0/km^{2}). The racial make-up of the village was 92.0% White, 0.4% Asian, 7.1% from other races, and 0.4% from two or more races. Hispanic or Latino of any race were 7.6% of the population.

There were 92 households, of which 33.7% had children under the age of 18 living with them, 43.5% were married couples living together, 7.6% had a female householder with no husband present, 4.3% had a male householder with no wife present, and 44.6% were non-families. 37.0% of all households were made up of individuals, and 10.9% had someone living alone who was 65 years of age or older. The average household size was 2.45 and the average family size was 3.31.

The median age was 33.5 years. 33.3% of residents were under the age of 18; 5.3% were between the ages of 18 and 24; 28.9% were from 25 to 44; 20.5% were from 45 to 64; and 12% were 65 years of age or older. The sex make-up of the village was 54.7% male and 45.3% female.

=== 2000 census ===
At the 2000 census, there were 186 people, 80 households and 50 families living in the village. The population density was 583.9 per square mile (225.4/km^{2}). There were 92 housing units at an average density of 288.8 per square mile (111.5/km^{2}). The racial make-up of the village was 100.00% White. 1.61% of the population were Hispanic or Latino of any race.

There were 80 households, of which 30.0% had children under the age of 18 living with them, 51.3% were married couples living together, 7.5% had a female householder with no husband present, and 37.5% were non-families. 33.8% of all households were made up of individuals, and 20.0% had someone living alone who was 65 years of age or older. The average household size was 2.33 and the average family size was 3.00.

22.6% of the population were under the age of 18, 9.1% from 18 to 24, 28.0% from 25 to 44, 24.7% from 45 to 64, and 15.6% who were 65 years of age or older. The median age was 39 years. For every 100 females, there were 102.2 males. For every 100 females age 18 and over, there were 105.7 males.

The median household income was $37,813 and the median family income was $39,583. Males had a median income of $26,500 and females $18,214. The per capita income was $15,141. None of the families and 1.4% of the population were living below the poverty line, including no under eighteens and 15.0% of those over 64.

== Notable people ==
- Rufus M. Day, Wisconsin State representative and farmer, lived in Mount Hope.
- Harriet Pullen (1860–1947), American entrepreneur and hotelier in Skagway, Alaska; born in Mount Hope
