= Northern Student Movement =

American civil rights organization

- Founded: 1961
- Founder: Peter J. Countryman
- Dissolved: 1966?
- Type: Civil rights organization
- Purpose: Tutoring 3,500 inner city youth in northeastern cities (1963); later sent students to sit-ins in the South and organized direct-action protests in the North.
- Location(s): New Haven, Connecticut and New York City
- Origins: Conference of the New England Student Christian Movement (1961)
- Method: Volunteerism, education, community organizing
- Key people: Peter J. Countryman; William L. Strickland
- Employees: 50 (1963)
- Volunteers: 2,200 (1963)

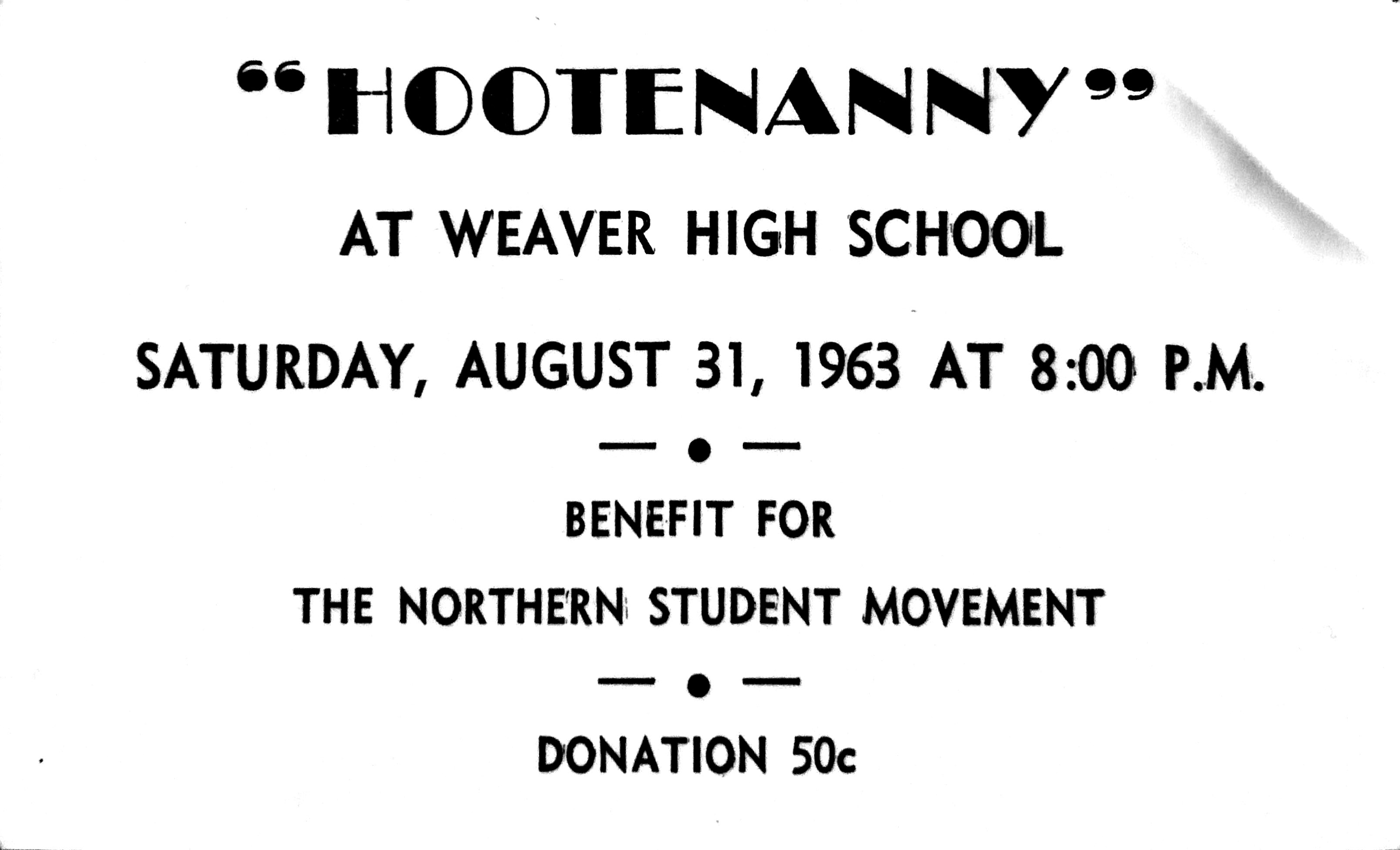
Northern Student Movement Hootenanny

The Northern Student Movement (NSM) was an American civil rights organization that drew inspiration from sit-ins and lunch counter protests led by students in the south. NSM was founded at Yale University in 1961 by Peter J. Countryman, which grew out of the work of a committee formed by the New England Student Christian Movement, and was affiliated with the Student Nonviolent Coordinating Committee (SNCC). Countryman began NSM's work by collecting books for a predominantly African-American college and raising funds for SNCC. He then turned to organizing tutoring programs for inner city youth in northeastern cities. By 1963, NSM was reported to be helping as many as 3,500 children using 2,200 student volunteers from 50 colleges and universities. NSM also encouraged direct-action protests, sending volunteers to sit-ins in the South and organizing rent strikes in the North. In the early 60's, NSM's work was divided into three areas which were each headed by an executive committee: "the campus, the community, and the south."

== History ==
Peter J. Countryman, a white Yale student, helped assemble the NSM in the fall of 1961 from “existing networks of the Student Christian Movement of New England.” The mission of the NSM was to support the work of the SNCC and to "challenge discrimination in the North". The Northern Student Movement soon began organizing projects in the communities of the North to fight against injustice in Black communities.

Countryman stepped down as NSM's executive director in 1963 and was replaced by William L. Strickland.

=== Early work ===
The organization started some tutoring and community programs in the most segregated and poverty-stricken urban areas up past the Mason-Dixon line. “In the Roxbury-South End area of Boston, NSM led a voter registration drive, preschool programs, and a Black history workshop.” In Philadelphia, a Northern Student Movement freedom library was started to “have books by and about black people.”

The NSM had 50 fulltime employees with different sources reporting of somewhere between 2,200 and 2,500 college student volunteers. These college students focused on helping the communities like tutoring and establishing the North End Community Action Project “that organized protests against discriminatory hiring practices.”

Also, the Northern Student Movement focused more on organizing locally. However, while advocates of Black Power acknowledged the achievements and dedication of the hard working white NSM members, and a dramatic shift taken place of creating an all-Black organization because many felt that blacks really needed to be the ones determining what their communities needed. Bill Strickland, the second executive director of the NSM, was the leadman in “rent strikes, school boycotts, and neighborhood-initiated community projects”.

=== Later years ===
After a shooting that wounded NSM volunteer, Bruce Payne, who was with a group of fellow volunteers in Mississippi to help with a voter registration campaign, sparked a visit by Dr. Martin Luther King to where it NSM all started, Yale University. He wrote a letter to the Universities chaplain, an advocate of the NSM, which he writes that he was “really heartened by the movement in the right direction I sense at Yale.”

The NSM declined later in the decade as Black students began to protest and negotiate for the successful temporary removal of police from campuses, amnesty for striking students, and the creation of Black studies courses like the ones the NSM started provided in other cities.

== Archives ==
The records of the Northern Student Movement, including a complete run of its periodical, Freedom North, are on file with the Manuscripts, Archives and Rare Books Division of the New York Public Library.

Oral History interviews with several NSM organizers are available through the Columbia Center for Oral History Research.
