= Burton, Wisconsin =

- Unincorporated community
- Location within Wisconsin Location within the United States
- Coordinates: 42°43′04″N 90°49′02″W
- Country: United States
- State: Wisconsin
- County: Grant
- Town: Waterloo
- Elevation: 669 ft (204 m)
- Time zone: UTC-6 (Central (CST))
  - Summer (DST): UTC-5 (CDT)
- Area code: 608
- GNIS feature ID: 1562456

Burton is an unincorporated community located in the town of Waterloo, Grant County, Wisconsin, United States. The community was platted in 1876 and named for Daniel Raymond Burt, a businessman and Wisconsin Territorial legislator.
