= Harriet Pullen =

American entrepreneur and hotelier

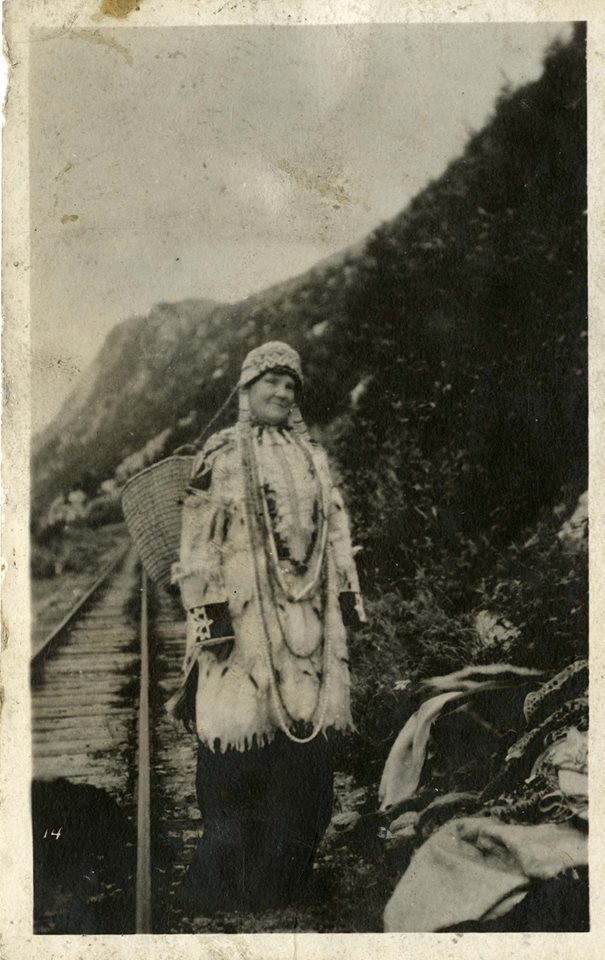
- Born: August 13, 1860; Mount Hope, Wisconsin
- Died: August 9, 1947 (aged 86)
- Other names: "Ma" Pullen
- Occupations: Businesswoman, hotelier
- Era: Klondike Gold Rush

Harriet "Ma" Pullen (August 13, 1860 – August 9, 1947), was an American entrepreneur and hotelier in Skagway, Alaska. After running a freighting company, she bought a house and converted it into the luxurious Pullen House Hotel.

== Early life ==
She was born to Andrew Jackson and Mary Jane Stewart Smith in Mount Hope, Wisconsin, on August 13, 1860. On February 23, 1881, she married Daniel Webster Pullen. They had a farm in Cape Flattery, Washington, and had four children, Dan, Royal, Mildred and Chester. (Eldest son Dan would later become the first appointment to West Point from Alaska and an All-American football right tackle in 1909, as well as a colonel in World War I.)

By 1881, her husband was reportedly the richest man in Clallam County. He lost his fortune on court costs while trying to steal the Quileute Indian Reservation. She left her children with friends in Seattle and traveled to Skagway to earn enough money to support them.

== Career ==
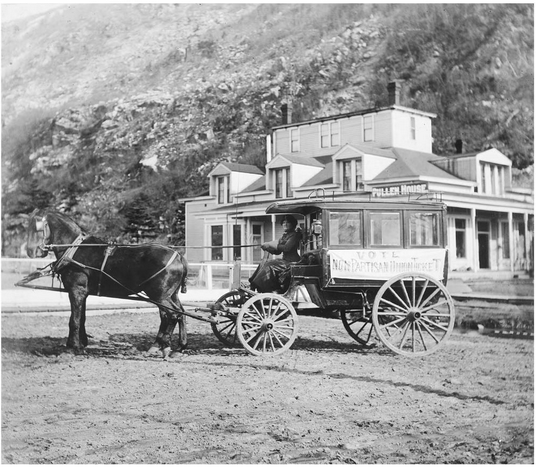
Harriet Pullen and her "Pullen House Bus" in 1914, with her hotel in the background

Arriving in Skagway in early 1897 with only $7 (according to her), she quickly found work as a cook for the workers of Captain William Moore, one of the founders of the settlement. In her spare time, she took discarded tin cans and beat them into pie pans. She baked and sold apple pies to prospectors passing through on their way to the Klondike Gold Rush. She used her profits to start a freighting company, which provided transportation on the White Pass trail. When the White Pass and Yukon Route railroad opened, her business waned, so she purchased a house from Moore and turned it into the luxurious and very successful Pullen House Hotel. With her finances secured, she sent for her children. Her husband arrived sometime later, but left, seeking his own fortune in the Klondike. She became famous for her hospitality and acquired the nickname "Ma".

Pullen was also a suffragist. A women's suffrage bill was the first bill passed by both the House and Senate of the Alaskan Territory, being signed into law on March 21, 1913. After the bill passed, she used a wagon, called the "Pullen House Bus", to help women reach polling locations in Alaska. Pullen supported temperance and her wagon had a sign that read, "Vote Dry and Protect Your Home."

When she died in 1947, she was buried near her hotel.

Her great-granddaughter Eleanor Phillips Brackbill wrote a biography about her, The Queen of Heartbreak Trail: The Life and Times of Harriet Smith Pullen, Pioneering Woman.
