= Potosi (town), Wisconsin =

Town in Grant County, Wisconsin

Potosi, Wisconsin
- Town
- Town of Potosi
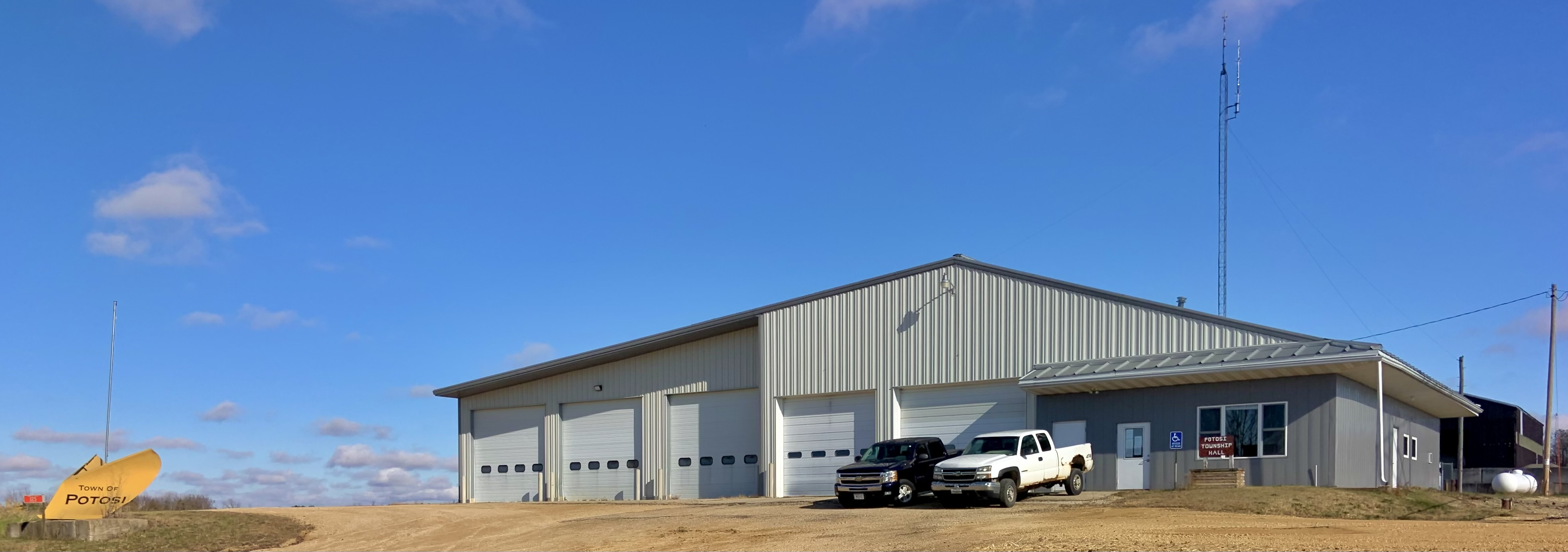
- Town Hall

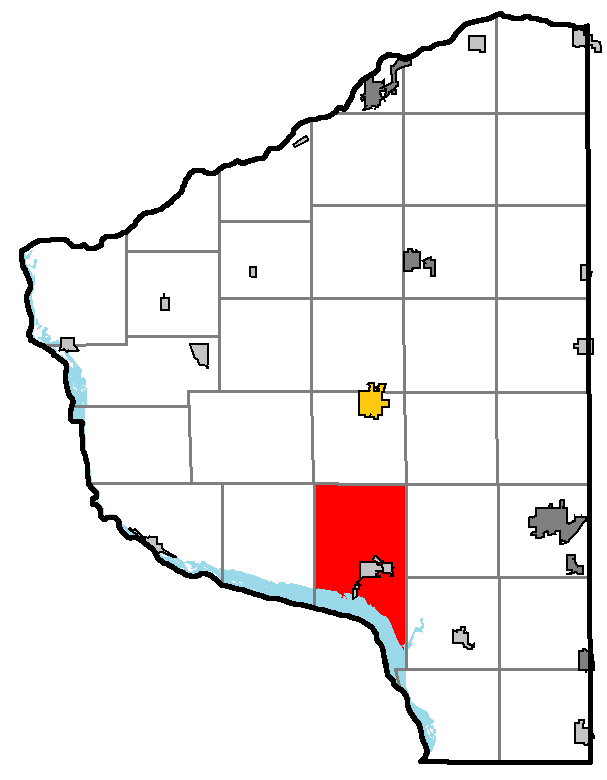
- Location of Potosi within Grant County, Wisconsin

- Location of Grant County, Wisconsin
- Coordinates: 42°40′04″N 90°42′57″W
- Country: United States
- State: Wisconsin
- County: Grant

Area
  - Total: 56.13 sq mi (145.4 km^{2})
  - Land: 46.08 sq mi (119.3 km^{2})
  - Water: 10.5 sq mi (27 km^{2})

Population (2020)
  - Total: 813
  - Density: 17.6/sq mi (6.81/km^{2})
- Time zone: UTC-6 (Central (CST))
  - Summer (DST): UTC-5 (CDT)
- ZIP Code: 53820
- Area code(s): 608 and 353
- GNIS feature ID: 1583964
- Website: townofpotosiwi.org

The Town of Potosi is located in Grant County, Wisconsin, United States. The population was 813 at the 2020 census. The Village of Potosi and the unincorporated communities of British Hollow, Buena Vista, Rockville, and Van Buren are located in the town.

== Geography ==
According to the United States Census Bureau, the town has a total area of 57.7 square miles (149.4 km^{2}), of which 46.5 square miles (120.3 km^{2}) is land and 11.2 square miles (29.1 km^{2}) (19.45%) is water.

== Demographics ==
At the 2000 United States census there were 831 people, 299 households, and 232 families living in the town. The population density was 17.9 people per square mile (6.9/km^{2}). There were 337 housing units at an average density of 7.3 per square mile (2.8/km^{2}). The racial makeup of the town was 99.40% White, and 0.60% from two or more races. 0.00% of the population were Hispanic or Latino of any race. Of the 299 households 36.1% had children under the age of 18 living with them, 67.9% were married couples living together, 5.0% had a female householder with no husband present, and 22.4% were non-families. 17.4% of households were one person and 4.3% were one person aged 65 or older. The average household size was 2.78 and the average family size was 3.16.

The age distribution was 28.5% under the age of 18, 7.0% from 18 to 24, 28.9% from 25 to 44, 26.6% from 45 to 64, and 9.0% 65 or older. The median age was 37 years. For every 100 females, there were 114.2 males. For every 100 females age 18 and over, there were 116.0 males.

The median household income was $42,697 and the median family income was $44,141. Males had a median income of $28,056 versus $18,929 for females. The per capita income for the town was $16,379. About 1.7% of families and 3.9% of the population were below the poverty line, including 5.9% of those under age 18 and 1.4% of those age 65 or over.
