= Clifton, Grant County, Wisconsin =

Clifton, Wisconsin
- Town
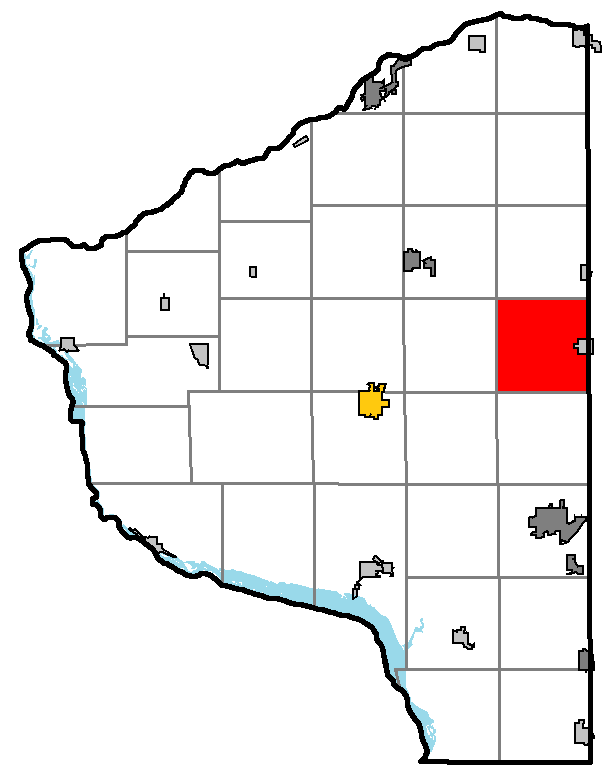
- Location of Clifton, within Grant County, Wisconsin

- Location of Grant County, within Wisconsin
- Coordinates: 42°54′41″N 90°30′10″W
- Country: United States
- State: Wisconsin
- County: Grant

Area
  - Total: 35.7 sq mi (92.5 km^{2})
  - Land: 35.7 sq mi (92.5 km^{2})
  - Water: 0 sq mi (0 km^{2})
- Elevation: 1,010 ft (308 m)

Population (2020)
  - Total: 380
  - Density: 11/sq mi (4.1/km^{2})
- Time zone: UTC-6 (Central (CST))
  - Summer (DST): UTC-5 (CDT)
- Area code: 608
- FIPS code: 55-15500
- GNIS feature ID: 1582979

Clifton is a town in Grant County, Wisconsin, United States. The population was 380 at the 2020 census. The unincorporated community of Annaton is located in the town. The town was named for Bosmon Clifton, a community and religious benefactor who was born in Delaware and came north from St. Charles County, Missouri in 1834.

== Geography ==
According to the United States Census Bureau, the town has a total area of 35.7 square miles (92.5 km^{2}), of which 35.7 square miles (92.5 km^{2}) is land and 0.03% is water.

== Demographics ==
At the 2000 census there were 304 people, 108 households, and 77 families living in the town. The population density was 8.5 people per square mile (3.3/km^{2}). There were 112 housing units at an average density of 3.1 per square mile (1.2/km^{2}). The racial makeup of the town was 99.01% White, and 0.99% from two or more races. Hispanic or Latino people of any race were 0.33%.

Of the 108 households 37% had children under the age of 18 living with them, 66.7% were married couples living together, 4.6% had a female householder with no husband present, and 27.8% were non-families. 20.4% of households were one person and 7.4% were one person aged 65 or older. The average household size was 2.81 and the average family size was 3.36.

The age distribution was 32.2% under the age of 18, 8.2% from 18 to 24, 30.9% from 25 to 44, 18.8% from 45 to 64, and 9.9% 65 or older. The median age was 34 years. For every 100 females, there were 100 males. For every 100 females age 18 and over, there were 114.6 males.

The median household income was $45,625 and the median family income was $50,833. Males had a median income of $28,750 versus $22,250 for females. The per capita income for the town was $16,978. About 14% of families and 17.2% of the population were below the poverty line, including 27.6% of those under the age of 18 and none of those 65 or over.
