= Waterloo, Grant County, Wisconsin =

Waterloo, Wisconsin
- Town
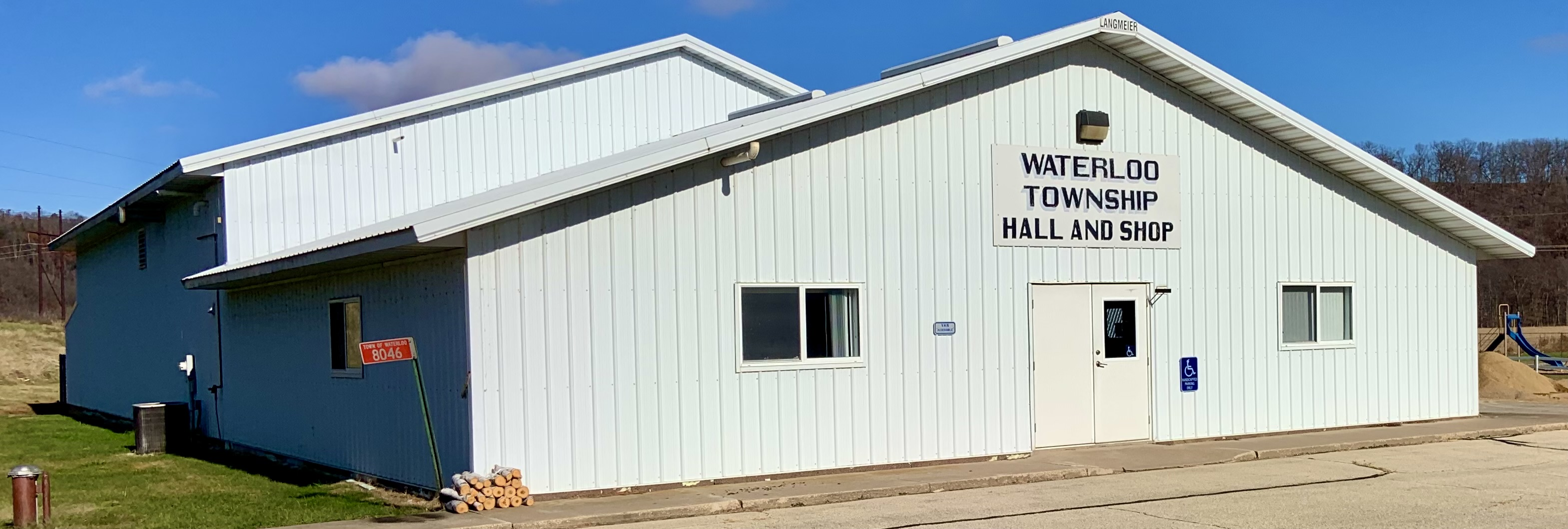
- Town hall

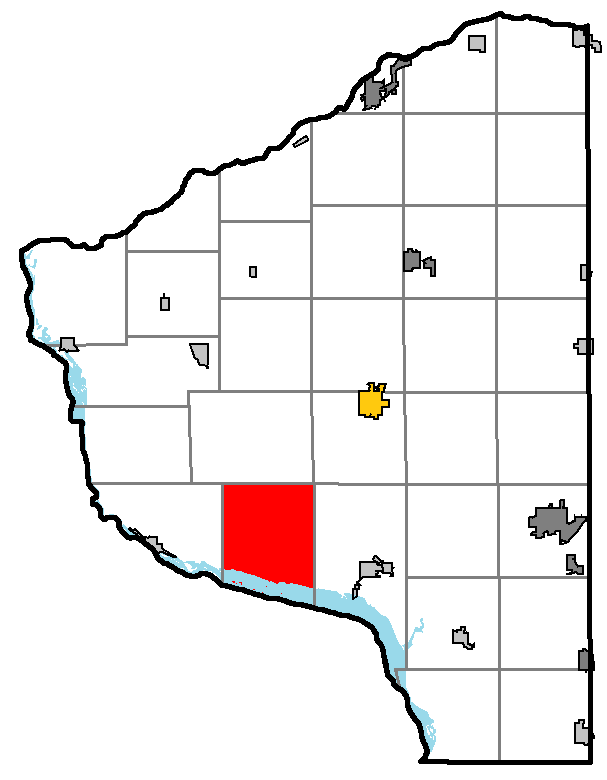
- Location of Waterloo, within Grant County, Wisconsin

- Location of Grant County, Wisconsin
- Coordinates: 42°43′28″N 90°49′50″W
- Country: United States
- State: Wisconsin
- County: Grant

Area
  - Total: 44.6 sq mi (115.5 km^{2})
  - Land: 38.2 sq mi (98.9 km^{2})
  - Water: 6.4 sq mi (16.6 km^{2})
- Elevation: 690 ft (210 m)

Population (2020)
  - Total: 552
  - Density: 14.5/sq mi (5.58/km^{2})
- Time zone: UTC-6 (Central (CST))
  - Summer (DST): UTC-5 (CDT)
- Area code: 608
- FIPS code: 55-83900
- GNIS feature ID: 1584362

Waterloo is a town in Grant County in the U.S. state of Wisconsin. The population was 552 at the 2020 census. The unincorporated communities of Burton and McCartney are located in the town.

== Geography ==
According to the United States Census Bureau, the town has a total area of 44.6 square miles (115.5 km^{2}), of which 38.2 square miles (98.9 km^{2}) is land and 6.4 square miles (16.6 km^{2}) (14.4%) is water.

== Demographics ==
At the 2000 census there were 557 people, 210 households, and 165 families living in the town. The population density was 14.6 people per square mile (5.6/km^{2}). There were 234 housing units at an average density of 6.1 per square mile (2.4/km^{2}). The racial makeup of the town was 98.92% White, 0.54% Native American, 0.36% from other races, and 0.18% from two or more races. Hispanic or Latino people of any race were 0.9%.

Of the 210 households 30.5% had children under the age of 18 living with them, 69% were married couples living together, 6.2% had a female householder with no husband present, and 21.4% were non-families. 17.6% of households were one person and 3.3% were one person aged 65 or older. The average household size was 2.65 and the average family size was 3.01.

The age distribution was 23.5% under the age of 18, 8.8% from 18 to 24, 26% from 25 to 44, 30.7% from 45 to 64, and 11% 65 or older. The median age was 39 years. For every 100 females, there were 115.1 males. For every 100 females age 18 and over, there were 106.8 males.

The median household income was $36,932 and the median family income was $40,313. Males had a median income of $27,500 versus $19,118 for females. The per capita income for the town was $17,579. About 9.5% of families and 15.3% of the population were below the poverty line, including 22.6% of those under age 18 and 10.9% of those age 65 or over.

== Notable people ==
- Daniel Raymond Burt, businessman and Wisconsin Territorial legislator, lived in the town
- Edward H. Sprague, Wisconsin State legislator, born in the town
