= Fair Play, Wisconsin =

- Unincorporated community
- Location within Wisconsin Location within the United States
- Coordinates: 42°32′08″N 90°33′38″W
- Country: United States
- State: Wisconsin
- County: Grant
- Town: Jamestown
- Elevation: 899 ft (274 m)
- Time zone: UTC-6 (Central (CST))
  - Summer (DST): UTC-5 (CDT)
- Area code: 608
- GNIS feature ID: 1564798

Fair Play is an unincorporated community located in the town of Jamestown in Grant County, Wisconsin, United States.

== Notable people ==
- Wiley Scribner, politician and acting governor of Montana Territory
