= Hickory Grove, Wisconsin =

Town of Hickory Grove
- Town
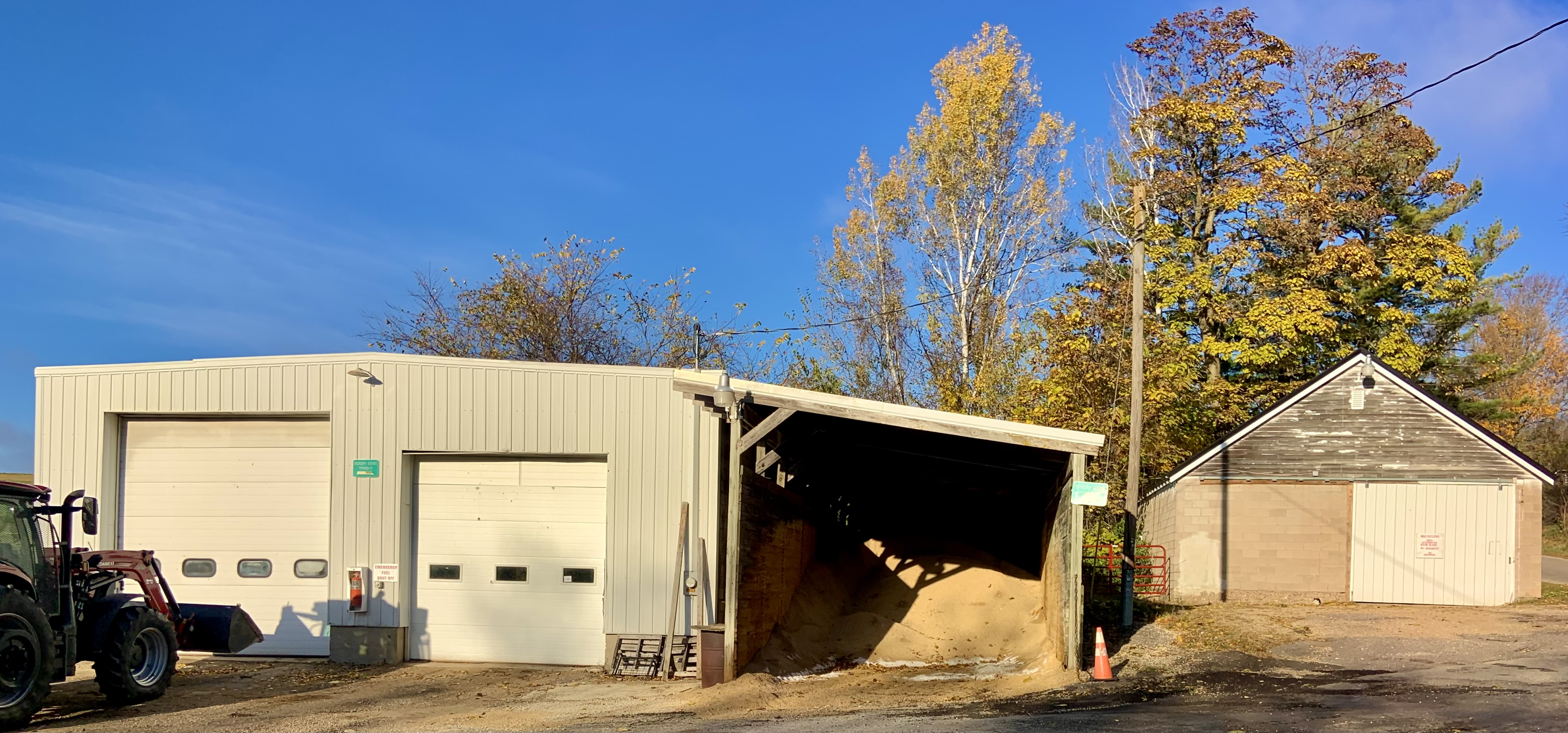
- Town hall

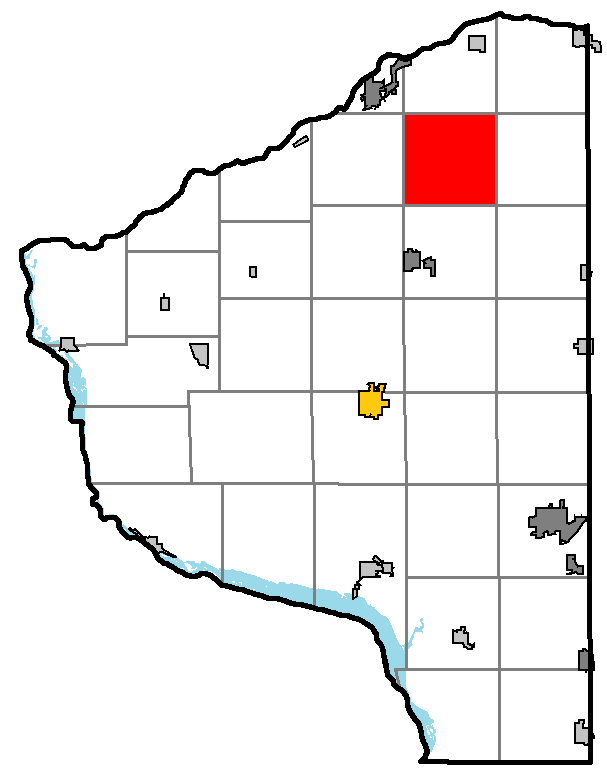
- Location of the Town of Hickory Grove, within Grant County, Wisconsin

- Location of Grant County within Wisconsin
- Coordinates: 43°3′57″N 90°35′44″W
- Country: United States
- State: Wisconsin
- County: Grant

Area
  - Total: 36.3 sq mi (94.1 km^{2})
  - Land: 36.3 sq mi (94.1 km^{2})
  - Water: 0 sq mi (0.0 km^{2})
- Elevation: 1,066 ft (325 m)

Population (2020)
  - Total: 568
  - Density: 12/sq mi (4.7/km^{2})
- Time zone: UTC-6 (Central (CST))
  - Summer (DST): UTC-5 (CDT)
- Area code: 608
- FIPS code: 55-34300
- GNIS feature ID: 1583385
- Website: https://hickorygrovetown.com/

The Town of Hickory Grove is located in Grant County, Wisconsin, United States. The population was 568 at the 2020 census. The unincorporated communities of Hickory Grove and Homer are located in the town.

== Geography ==
According to the United States Census Bureau, the town has a total area of 36.3 square miles (94.1 km^{2}), all land.

== Demographics ==
At the 2000 census there were 443 people, 146 households, and 113 families living in the town. The population density was 12.2 people per square mile (4.7/km^{2}). There were 164 housing units at an average density of 4.5 per square mile (1.7/km^{2}). The racial makeup of the town was 99.32% White, and 0.68% from two or more races. Hispanic or Latino of any race were 0.23%.

Of the 146 households 36.3% had children under the age of 18 living with them, 72.6% were married couples living together, 2.1% had a female householder with no husband present, and 22.6% were non-families. 18.5% of households were one person and 4.1% were one person aged 65 or older. The average household size was 3.03 and the average family size was 3.45.

The age distribution was 31.8% under the age of 18, 9.7% from 18 to 24, 24.6% from 25 to 44, 25.7% from 45 to 64, and 8.1% 65 or older. The median age was 35 years. For every 100 females, there were 117.2 males. For every 100 females age 18 and over, there were 127.1 males.

The median household income was $36,250 and the median family income was $40,250. Males had a median income of $26,458 versus $23,438 for females. The per capita income for the town was $13,903. About 11.4% of families and 13.2% of the population were below the poverty line, including 14.1% of those under age 18 and 18.4% of those age 65 or over.
