= Ellenboro, Wisconsin =

Town of Ellenboro
- Town
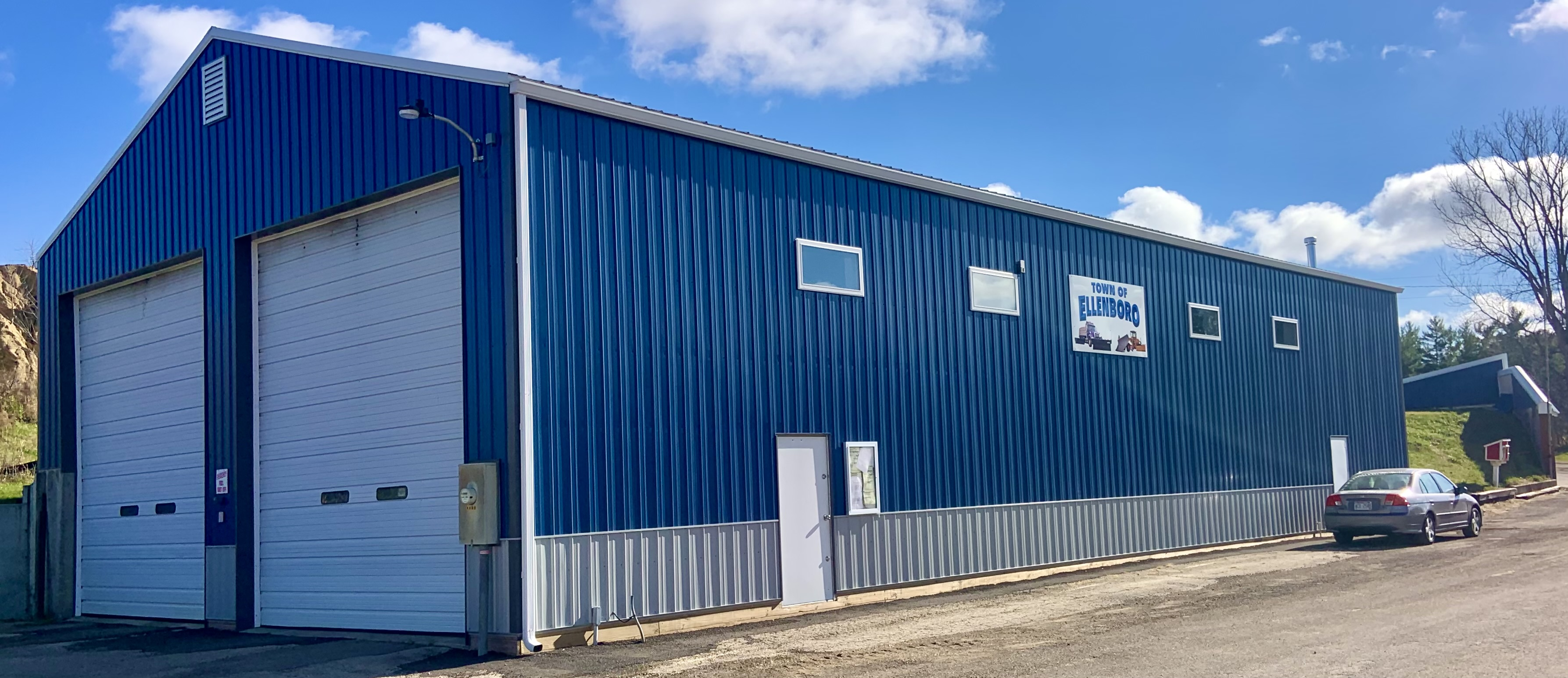
- Town hall

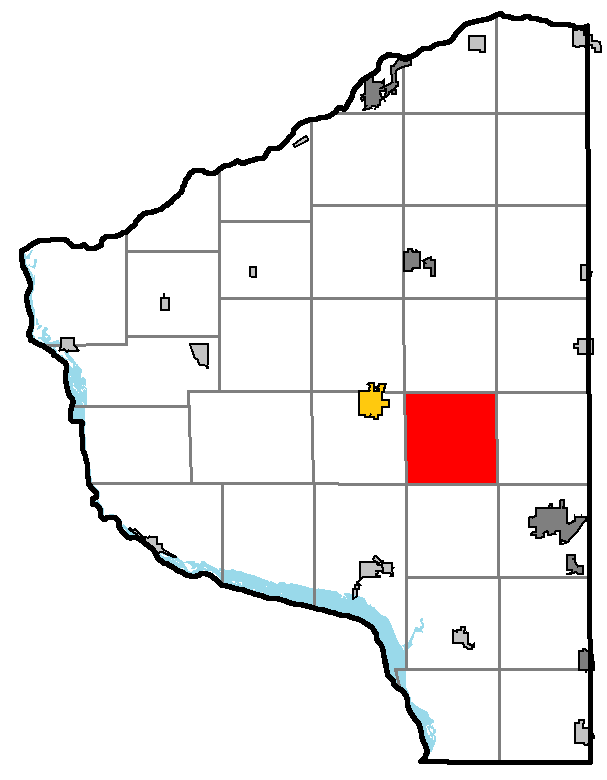
- Location of the Town of Ellenboro, within Grant County, Wisconsin

- Location of Grant County, within Wisconsin
- Coordinates: 42°48′16″N 90°36′27″W
- Country: United States
- State: Wisconsin
- County: Grant

Area
  - Total: 36.1 sq mi (93.6 km^{2})
  - Land: 36.1 sq mi (93.6 km^{2})
  - Water: 0 sq mi (0.0 km^{2})
- Elevation: 810 ft (247 m)

Population (2020)
  - Total: 580
  - Density: 16/sq mi (6.2/km^{2})
- Time zone: UTC-6 (Central (CST))
  - Summer (DST): UTC-5 (CDT)
- Area code: 608
- FIPS code: 55-23400
- GNIS feature ID: 1583153

The Town of Ellenboro is a town located in Grant County, Wisconsin, United States. The population was 580 at the 2020 census.

== Transportation ==
The town is located just west of Wisconsin Highway 81, approximately halfway between the cities of Platteville and Lancaster.

== Geography ==
According to the United States Census Bureau, the town has a total area of 36.2 square miles (93.6 km^{2}), all land.

== Demographics ==
At the 2000 census there were 608 people, 191 households, and 158 families living in the town. The population density was 16.8 people per square mile (6.5/km^{2}). There were 208 housing units at an average density of 5.8 per square mile (2.2/km^{2}). The racial makeup of the town was 99.34% White, and 0.66% from two or more races. Hispanic or Latino of any race were 0.33%.

Of the 191 households 42.4% had children under the age of 18 living with them, 70.2% were married couples living together, 8.4% had a female householder with no husband present, and 16.8% were non-families. 10.5% of households were one person and 3.1% were one person aged 65 or older. The average household size was 3.15 and the average family size was 3.42.

The age distribution was 33.9% under the age of 18, 6.9% from 18 to 24, 29.1% from 25 to 44, 22.0% from 45 to 64, and 8.1% 65 or older. The median age was 33 years. For every 100 females, there were 108.2 males. For every 100 females age 18 and over, there were 108.3 males.

The median household income was $42,917 and the median family income was $43,906. Males had a median income of $30,078 versus $21,250 for females. The per capita income for the town was $16,892. About 6.6% of families and 7.1% of the population were below the poverty line, including 10.3% of those under age 18 and none of those age 65 or over.
