= Peter J. Countryman =

American social activist

- Born: April 13, 1942; Chicago, Illinois, U.S.
- Died: October 15, 1992 (aged 50); West Lafayette, Indiana, U.S.
- Education: Yale University
- Occupation: Social activist
- Spouse: Joan Cannady Countryman

Peter J. Countryman (April 13, 1942 – October 15, 1992) was an American social activist and civil rights leader. He founded the Northern Student Movement at Yale University in 1961 and served as its executive director until 1963. Born in Chicago, Countryman directed a tutorial project in Philadelphia aimed at helping minority teenagers. He was one of the founders in 1967 of People for Human Rights, an interracial Philadelphia-area group. In 1970, he visited Cuba with the Venceremos Brigade. He contracted HIV/AIDS through IV drug use and died in West Lafayette, Indiana.
