= Hickory Grove, West Virginia =

- Unincorporated community
- Location within West Virginia Location within the United States
- Coordinates: 37°50′02″N 80°40′33″W
- Country: United States
- State: West Virginia
- County: Greenbrier
- Elevation: 2,628 ft (801 m)
- Time zone: UTC-5 (Eastern (EST))
  - Summer (DST): UTC-4 (EDT)
- Area codes: 304 & 681
- GNIS feature ID: 1554694

Hickory Grove is an unincorporated community in Greenbrier County, West Virginia, United States. Hickory Grove is 7.5 miles (12.1 km) north of Alderson.
