= B. W. Countryman =

Member of the South Dakota House of Representatives

Member of the South Dakota House of Representatives from the 11th district
- In office 1903–1906

Personal details
- Born: February 28, 1867 Grant County, Wisconsin
- Died: February 15, 1946 San Joaquin County, California
- Party: Republican
- Spouse: Alice E. Parkhurst

Bertram W. Countryman (February 28, 1867 – February 15, 1946) was a member of the South Dakota House of Representatives and served one term, from 1903 until 1906 for the 11th district.

== Biography ==
Countryman was born on February 28, 1867, in Grant County, Wisconsin. He moved to McCook County, Dakota Territory, in 1880. In 1889, he married Alice E. Parkhurst. In addition to his political activity, he was a grain dealer and organized Chautauqua assemblies.

== Career ==
Countryman was a member of the South Dakota House of Representatives from 1903 to 1906. He was a Republican.
