= Glen Haven, Wisconsin =

- Town
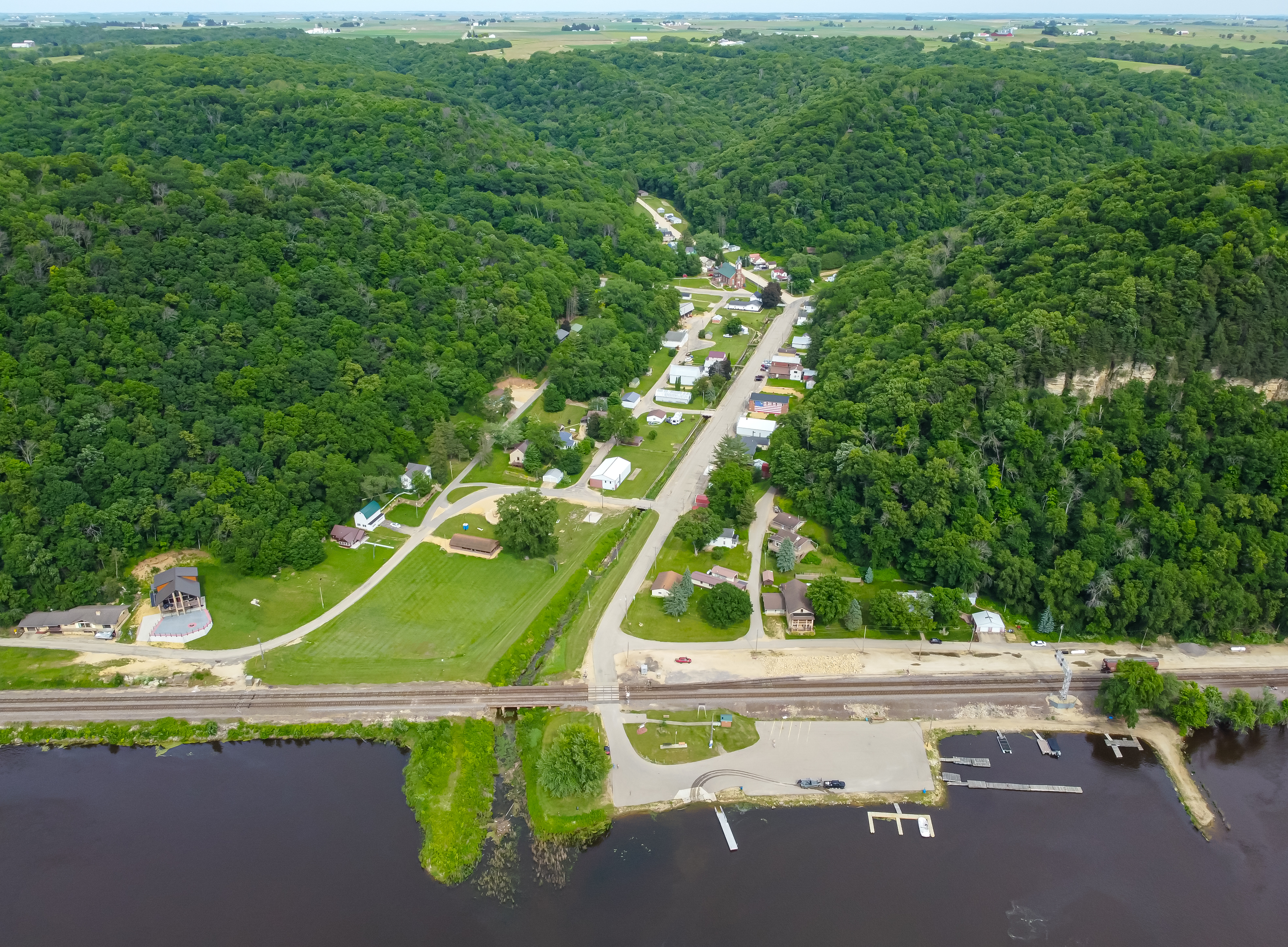
- BNSF Railway runs by town

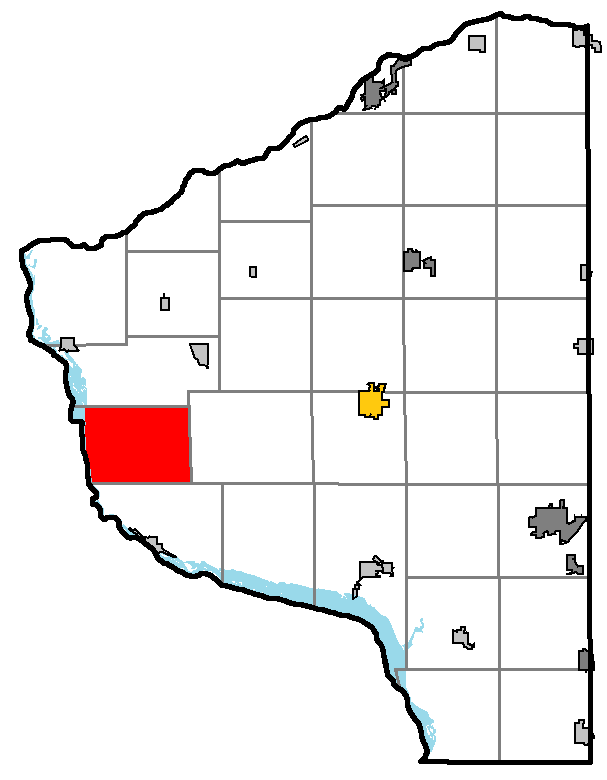
- Location of Glen Haven, within Grant County, Wisconsin

- Location of Grant County, Wisconsin
- Coordinates: 42°48′40″N 91°0′31″W
- Country: United States
- State: Wisconsin
- County: Grant

Area
  - Total: 35.4 sq mi (91.6 km^{2})
  - Land: 34.2 sq mi (88.7 km^{2})
  - Water: 1.1 sq mi (2.9 km^{2})
- Elevation: 1,020 ft (310 m)

Population (2020)
  - Total: 363
  - Density: 10.6/sq mi (4.09/km^{2})
- Time zone: UTC-6 (Central (CST))
  - Summer (DST): UTC-5 (CDT)
- Area code: 608
- FIPS code: 55-29525
- GNIS feature ID: 1583284

Glen Haven is a town in Grant County, Wisconsin, United States. According to the 2020 census, the town population was 363. The census-designated place of Glen Haven is located in the town.

== Geography ==
According to the United States Census Bureau, the town has a total area of 35.4 square miles (91.6 km^{2}), of which 34.3 square miles (88.7 km^{2}) is land and 1.1 square miles (2.9 km^{2}) (3.17%) is water.

== Demographics ==
At the 2000 census there were 490 people, 185 households, and 143 families living in the town. The population density was 14.3 people per square mile (5.5/km^{2}). There were 198 housing units at an average density of 5.8 per square mile (2.2/km^{2}). The racial makeup of the town was 99.59% White and 0.41% Asian. Of the 185 households 31.4% had children under the age of 18 living with them, 67.0% were married couples living together, 5.9% had a female householder with no husband present, and 22.2% were non-families. 18.9% of households were one person and 8.6% were one person aged 65 or older. The average household size was 2.65 and the average family size was 3.06.

The age distribution was 27.6% under the age of 18, 5.9% from 18 to 24, 25.9% from 25 to 44, 24.1% from 45 to 64, and 16.5% 65 or older. The median age was 39 years. For every 100 females, there were 105.9 males. For every 100 females age 18 and over, there were 106.4 males.

The median household income was $28,929 and the median family income was $30,481. Males had a median income of $25,000 versus $23,125 for females. The per capita income for the town was $14,077. About 9.3% of families and 15.5% of the population were below the poverty line, including 24.8% of those under age 18 and 12.0% of those age 65 or over.

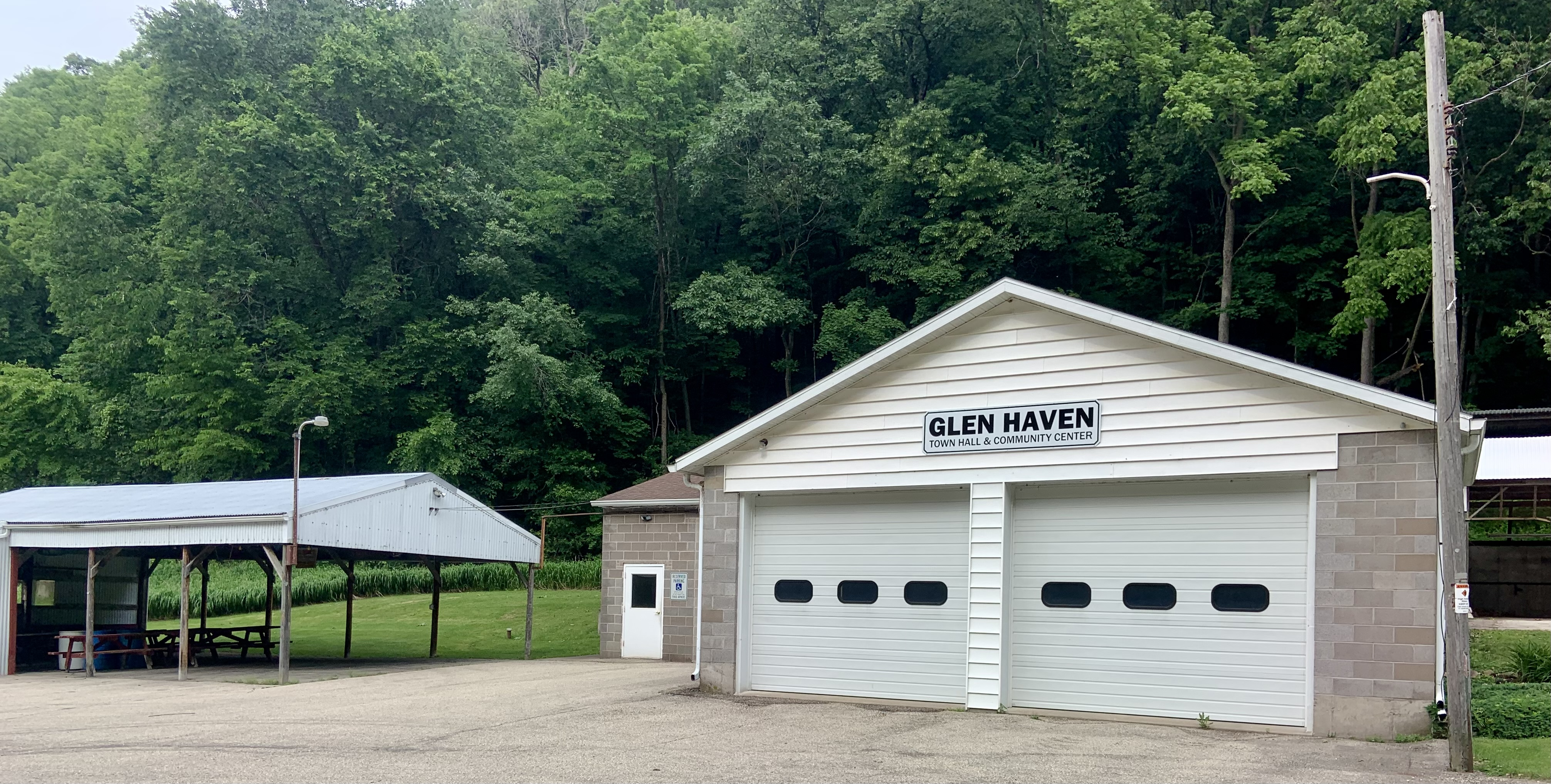
Glen Haven Town Hall
