= Glen Haven (CDP), Wisconsin =

Census-designated place in Wisconsin, United States

Glen Haven, Wisconsin
- Census-designated place
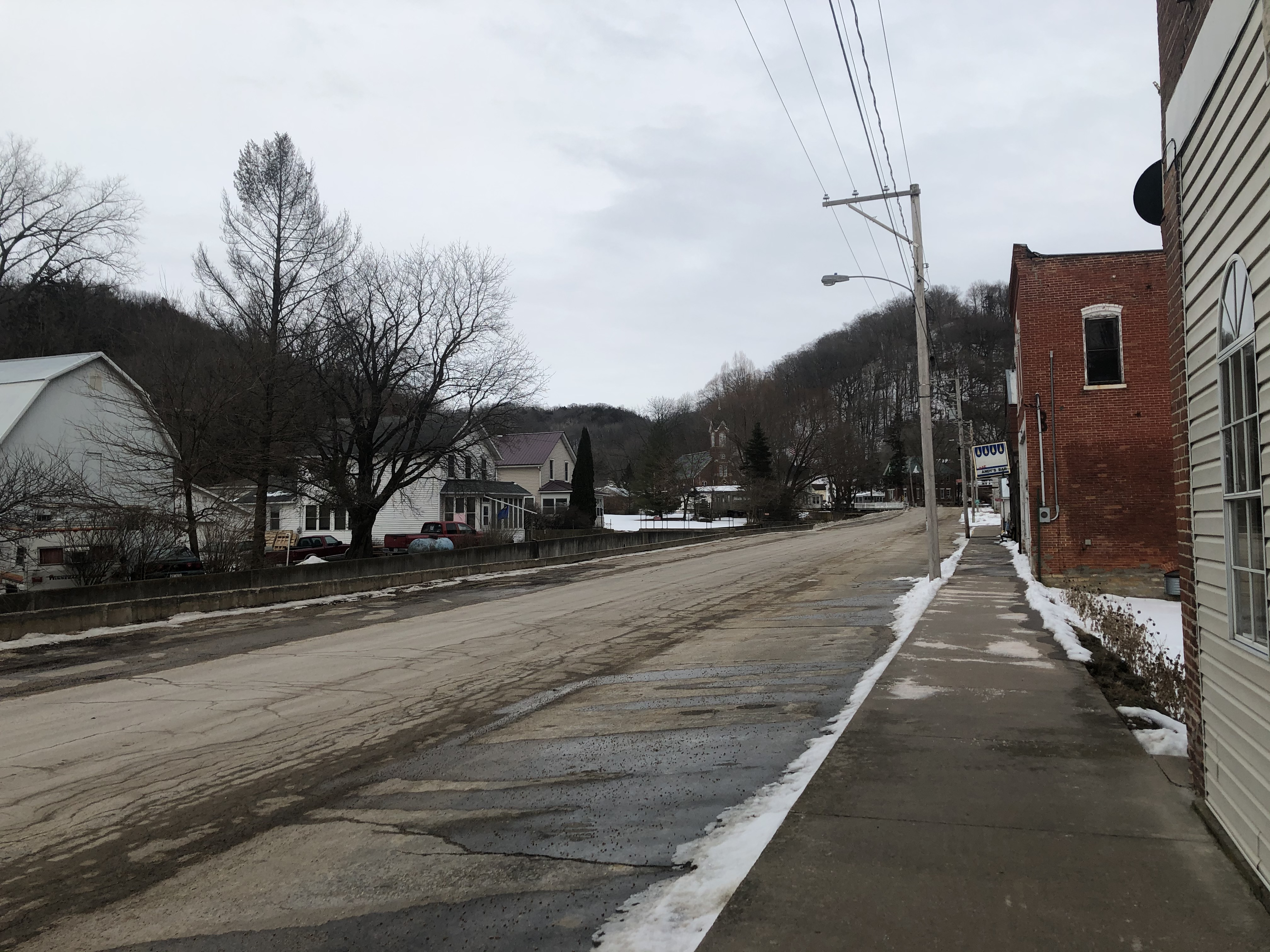
- View down Rock School Road

- Location within Wisconsin Location within the United States
- Coordinates: 42°49′35″N 91°04′15″W
- Country: United States
- State: Wisconsin
- County: Grant
- Town: Glen Haven

Area
  - Total: 2.340 sq mi (6.06 km^{2})
  - Land: 2.231 sq mi (5.78 km^{2})
  - Water: 0.109 sq mi (0.28 km^{2})
- Elevation: 653 ft (199 m)

Population (2020)
  - Total: 64
  - Density: 29/sq mi (11/km^{2})
- Time zone: UTC-6 (Central (CST))
  - Summer (DST): UTC-5 (CDT)
- ZIP code: 53810
- Area code: 608
- GNIS feature ID: 1565560

Glen Haven is an unincorporated census-designated place in the town of Glen Haven, Grant County, Wisconsin, United States. Glen Haven is located on the Mississippi River nine miles (14 km) northwest of Cassville. Glen Haven has a post office with ZIP code 53810. As of the 2020 census, its population was 64, down from 73 at the 2010 census.

The town has a USPS post office, a Catholic church, a bank outlet and two bars.
