= Rick Countryman =

American Post Jazz saxophonist

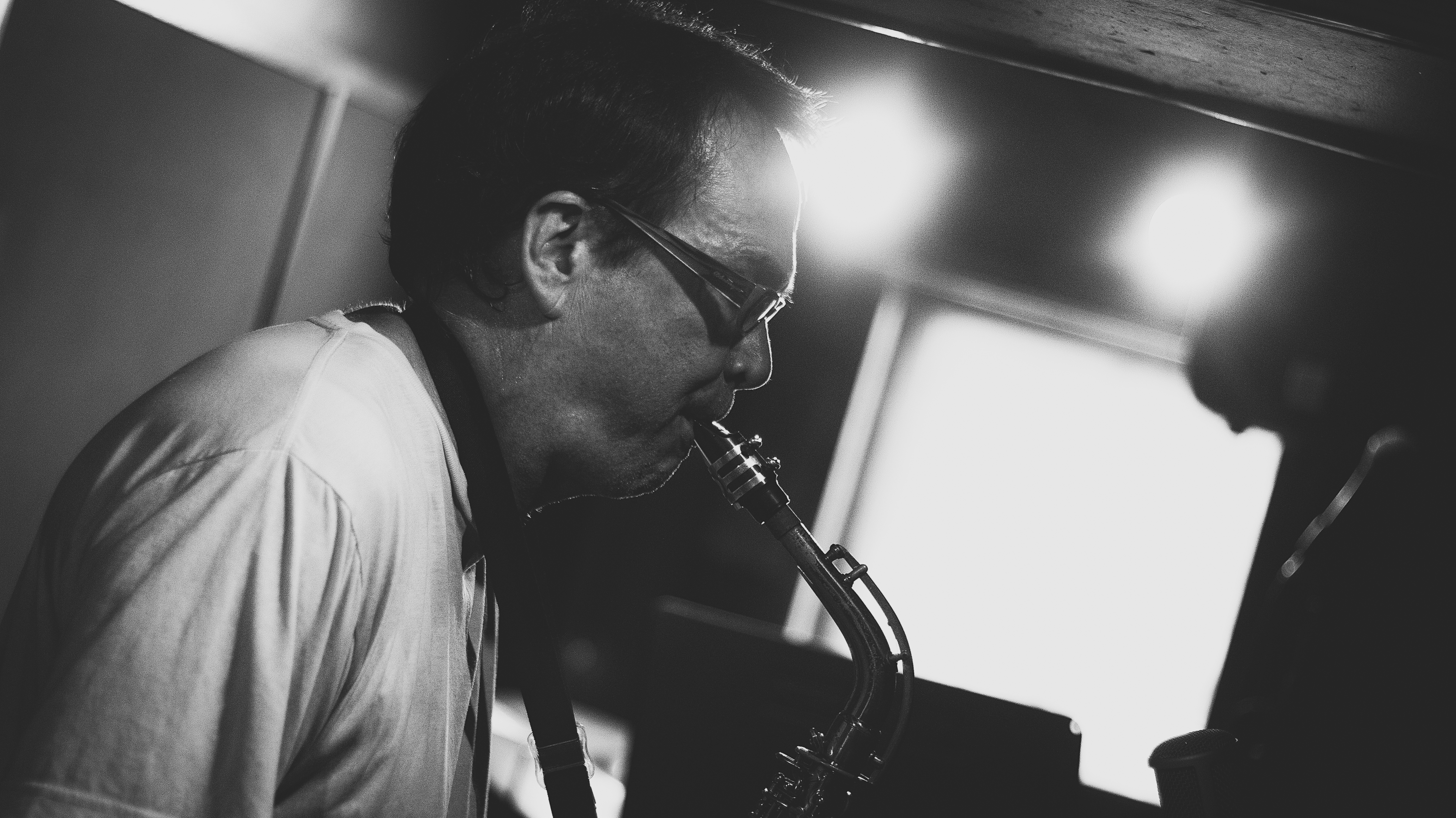

Background information
- Born: Rick Countryman; January 31, 1957 (age 69); Massachusetts, U.S.
- Genres: Free improvisation
- Instruments: Alto saxophone, baritone saxophone, alto flute, bass flute
- Labels: Improvising Beings; Chap Chap Records; FMR Records; Sol Disk Records

Rick Countryman (born January 31, 1957) is a free improvisation jazz saxophonist.

== Career ==
Years after as a baritone saxophone player, including an extended sabbatical, Rick Countryman made a late-life change to alto saxophone. His first recorded work with Christian Bucher, an avant-garde drummer from Switzerland, drew attention from a French music label, Improvising Beings, that subsequently released their album, Acceptance – Resistance in November, 2016. It received favorable reviews, both in the United States and Europe.

He has since been leading groups on alto saxophone, baritone saxophone, alto flute and bass flute; performing original compositions and Free Jazz/Free Improvisation with various trios and quartets.

Rick Countryman was a student of American jazz clarinetist and saxophonist Bert Wilson; and considers American jazz double bassist Michael Bisio and tenor saxophonist Rick Mandyck as early mentors. Based in the Philippines, Countryman features in Manila's jazz festivals and performance venues. In early 2019, he performed and conducted workshops with Dr. Royal Hartigan at the MAKILINC6 Arts Festival; and later that year at the Yilan International Art Festival in Taiwan as "acomo trio".

Countryman has over a dozen album releases distributed on five labels across Europe, Asia, and the United States, including multiple CDs with Japanese improvisational drummer, Sabu Toyozumi, who had made several trips to Manila to perform and record. Rick Countryman's prodigious recordings are found across specialty record labels which include Improvising Beings (France), Chap Chap Records (Japan),FMR Records (UK) and Sol Disk Records (US).
