= Grant County, Wisconsin =

County in Wisconsin, United States

- County
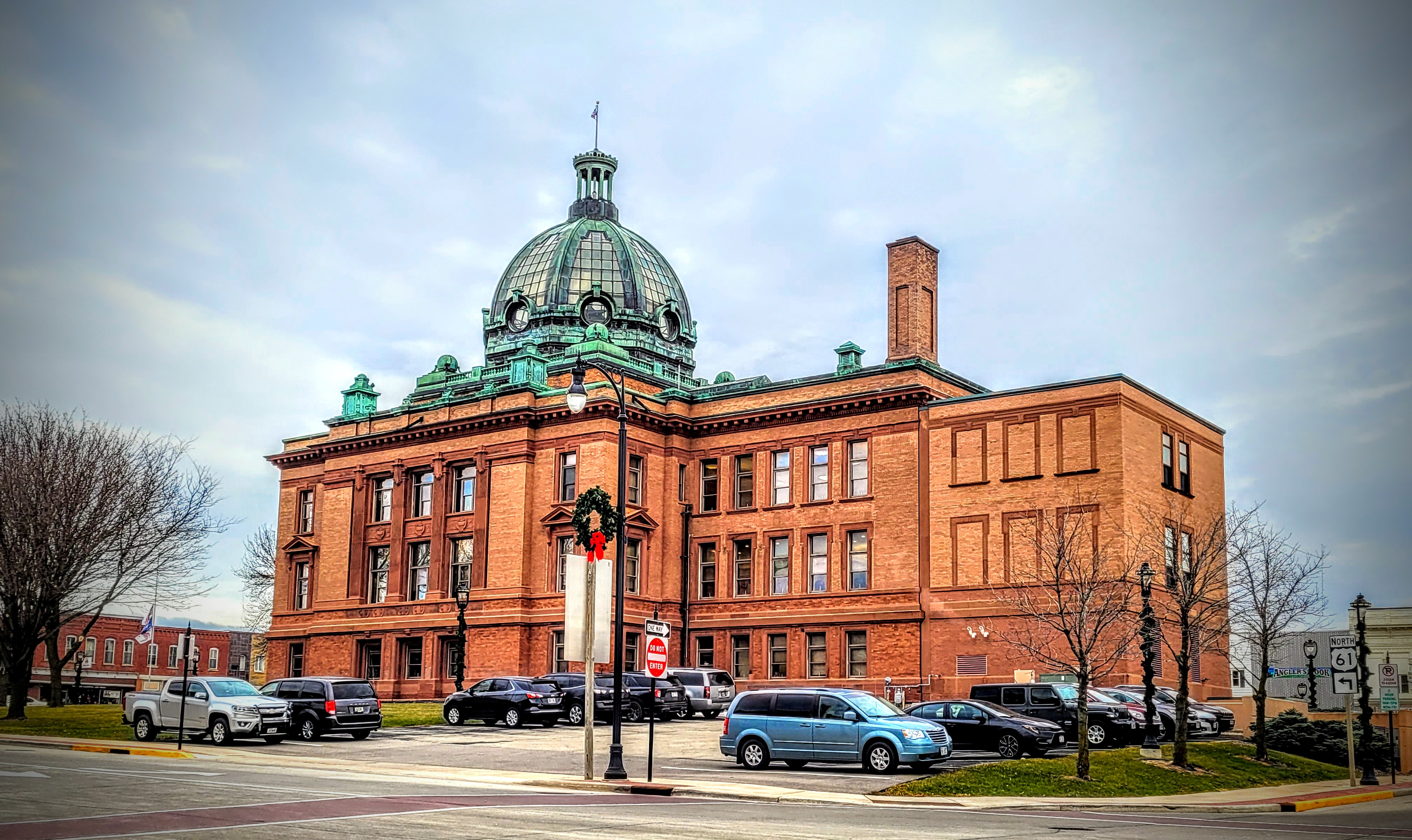
- Grant County Courthouse, Armand D. Koch, architect, 1902

- Location within the U.S. state of Wisconsin
- Coordinates: 42°52′N 90°43′W
- Country: United States
- State: Wisconsin
- Founded: 1837
- Seat: Lancaster
- Largest city: Platteville

Area
  - Total: 1,183 sq mi (3,060 km^{2})
  - Land: 1,147 sq mi (2,970 km^{2})
  - Water: 36 sq mi (93 km^{2}) 3.1%

Population (2020)
  - Total: 51,938
  - Estimate (2025): 52,446 ▲
  - Density: 45.6/sq mi (17.6/km^{2})
- Time zone: UTC−6 (Central)
  - Summer (DST): UTC−5 (CDT)
- Congressional district: 3rd
- Website: www.co.grant.wi.gov

Grant County is the most southwestern county in the U.S. state of Wisconsin. As of the 2020 census, the population was 51,938. Its county seat is Lancaster and its largest city is Platteville. The county is named after the Grant River, in turn named after a fur trader who lived in the area when Wisconsin was a territory. Grant County comprises the Platteville Micropolitan Statistical Area. It is in the tri-state area of Wisconsin, Illinois, and Iowa, and is crossed by travelers commuting to Madison, Wisconsin, from a number of eastern Iowan cities, and by residents of northern Illinois traveling to the Twin Cities or La Crosse, Wisconsin.

== History ==
=== Indian presence ===
What is now Grant County was largely uninhabited prior to contact with Europeans, as it was a border region between the territories of the Kickapoo, Menominee, and Illinois tribes. The only Native Americans to have a permanent settlement in the area were the Meskwaki people, who had a temporary village in what is now the extreme northeast of the county during the mid-1700s.

=== Colonial period ===
Between 1520 and 1620 this area was nominally ruled by Spain, although the lack of explorers left the region completely untouched by Spanish authority. The first Frenchmen to reach what is now Grant County were Jacques Marquette and Louis Joliet, who explored the region in the spring of 1673, after setting out from what would later become Green Bay. No permanent settlement was made. In 1680 Louis Hennepin also passed through the region that would later become Grant County, also making no permanent settlement. In 1689 Nicholas Perrot passed through the territory and claimed it for the King of France. The first settlement was a temporary trading post that Pierre Marin founded in 1725.

The British technically ruled the region during the period between the French and Indian War and the American Revolution, though no effort was made to settle or administer the region. After the abandonment of Marin's trading post, the region went unvisited until the expedition of Jonathan Carver, a New England Yankee who passed through what is now Grant County in 1766 during an attempt to discover the Pacific Ocean.

=== American period ===
In 1783, the British government acknowledged the jurisdiction of the United States over the land east of the Mississippi River, including what is now Grant County. American and European traders visiting the region over the next decades were yet as nomadic as the Indians, and no records survive. Grant County was created as part of Wisconsin Territory in 1837. It was named after an Indian trader; his first name, origins, and eventual fate are all unknown.

== Geography ==
According to the U.S. Census Bureau, the county has a total area of 1,183 square miles (3,060 km^{2}), of which 1,147 square miles (2,970 km^{2}) is land and 36 square miles (93 km^{2}) (3.1%) is water.

=== Major highways ===
- U.S. Highway 18
- U.S. Highway 61
- U.S. Highway 151
- Highway 11 (Wisconsin)
- Highway 35 (Wisconsin)
- Highway 80 (Wisconsin)
- Highway 81 (Wisconsin)
- Highway 129 (Wisconsin)
- Highway 133 (Wisconsin)

=== Railroads ===
- BNSF
- Wisconsin and Southern Railroad

=== Buses ===
- Platteville Public Transportation

=== Airports ===
- KOVS – Boscobel Municipal Airport
- KPVB – Platteville Municipal Airport serves the county and surrounding communities.
- 73C – Lancaster Municipal Airport enhances county service.
- C74 – Cassville Municipal Airport

=== Adjacent counties ===
- Crawford County – north
- Richland County – northeast
- Iowa County – east
- Lafayette County – east
- Jo Daviess County, Illinois – southeast
- Dubuque County, Iowa – south
- Clayton County, Iowa – west

== Demographics ==
Historical population
Census	Pop.	Note	%±
1840	3,926		—
1850	16,169		311.8%
1860	31,189		92.9%
1870	37,979		21.8%
1880	37,852		−0.3%
1890	36,651		−3.2%
1900	38,881		6.1%
1910	39,007		0.3%
1920	39,044		0.1%
1930	38,469		−1.5%
1940	40,639		5.6%
1950	41,460		2.0%
1960	44,419		7.1%
1970	48,398		9.0%
1980	51,736		6.9%
1990	49,264		−4.8%
2000	49,597		0.7%
2010	51,208		3.2%
2020	51,938		1.4%
2025 (est.)	52,446	▲	1.0%
U.S. Decennial Census; 1790–1960 1900–1990; 1990–2000 2010–2020

=== Racial and ethnic composition ===
Grant County, Wisconsin – Racial and ethnic composition Note: the US Census treats Hispanic/Latino as an ethnic category. This table excludes Latinos from the racial categories and assigns them to a separate category. Hispanics/Latinos may be of any race.
Race / ethnicity (NH = Non-Hispanic)	Pop 1980	Pop 1990	Pop 2000	Pop 2010	Pop 2020	% 1980	% 1990	% 2000	% 2010	% 2020
White alone (NH)	51,281	48,717	48,542	49,296	48,325	99.12%	98.89%	97.87%	96.27%	93.04%
Black or African American alone (NH)	106	76	257	573	679	0.20%	0.15%	0.52%	1.12%	1.31%
Native American or Alaska Native alone (NH)	53	73	55	89	95	0.10%	0.15%	0.11%	0.17%	0.18%
Asian alone (NH)	100	231	229	300	411	0.19%	0.47%	0.46%	0.59%	0.79%
Native Hawaiian or Pacific Islander alone (NH)	x	x	3	4	8	x	x	0.01%	0.01%	0.02%
Other race alone (NH)	29	7	11	9	58	0.06%	0.01%	0.02%	0.02%	0.11%
Mixed race or Multiracial (NH)	x	x	220	288	1,126	x	x	0.44%	0.56%	2.17%
Hispanic or Latino (any race)	167	160	280	649	1,236	0.32%	0.32%	0.56%	1.27%	2.38%
Total	51,736	49,264	49,597	51,208	51,938	100.00%	100.00%	100.00%	100.00%	100.00%

=== 2020 census ===
As of the 2020 census, the county had a population of 51,938. The population density was 45.3 people per square mile (17.5 people/km^{2}). There were 22,110 housing units at an average density of 19.3 units per square mile (7.5 units/km^{2}).

The median age was 37.2 years. 21.4% of residents were under the age of 18 and 18.6% of residents were 65 years of age or older. For every 100 females there were 107.0 males, and for every 100 females age 18 and over there were 108.6 males.

The racial makeup of the county was 93.8% White, 1.3% Black or African American, 0.2% American Indian and Alaska Native, 0.8% Asian, less than 0.1% Native Hawaiian and Pacific Islander, 1.0% from some other race, and 2.8% from two or more races. Hispanic or Latino residents of any race comprised 2.4% of the population.

There were 19,956 households in the county, of which 26.3% had children under the age of 18 living in them. Of all households, 49.0% were married-couple households, 20.4% were households with a male householder and no spouse or partner present, and 22.5% were households with a female householder and no spouse or partner present. About 29.3% of all households were made up of individuals and 12.4% had someone living alone who was 65 years of age or older.

There were 22,110 housing units, of which 9.7% were vacant. Among occupied housing units, 69.6% were owner-occupied and 30.4% were renter-occupied. The homeowner vacancy rate was 1.1% and the rental vacancy rate was 8.4%.

22.8% of residents lived in urban areas, while 77.2% lived in rural areas.

2000 Census Age Pyramid for Grant County.

=== 2000 census ===
As of the census of 2000, there were 49,597 people, 18,465 households, and 12,390 families residing in the county. The population density was 43 people per square mile (17 people/km^{2}). There were 19,940 housing units at an average density of 17 units per square mile (6.6 units/km^{2}). The racial makeup of the county was 98.23% White, 0.52% Black or African American, 0.13% Native American, 0.46% Asian, 0.01% Pacific Islander, 0.14% from other races, and 0.50% from two or more races. 0.56% of the population were Hispanic or Latino of any race. 52.0% were of German, 9.2% English, 8.8% Irish, 6.6% American and 6.4% Norwegian ancestry.

There were 18,465 households, out of which 30.50% had children under the age of 18 living with them, 56.10% were married couples living together, 7.50% had a female householder with no husband present, and 32.90% were non-families. 26.00% of all households were made up of individuals, and 12.10% had someone living alone who was 65 years of age or older. The average household size was 2.51 and the average family size was 3.03.

In the county, the population was spread out, with 23.70% under the age of 18, 14.60% from 18 to 24, 24.80% from 25 to 44, 21.60% from 45 to 64, and 15.30% who were 65 years of age or older. The median age was 36 years. For every 100 females there were 103.00 males. For every 100 females age 18 and over, there were 102.00 males.

== Government and infrastructure ==
The Wisconsin Secure Program Facility (WSPF), a Wisconsin Department of Corrections prison for men, is located in Boscobel in Grant County.

== Politics ==
United States presidential election results for Grant County, Wisconsin
Year	Republican		Democratic		Third party(ies)	
Year	No.	%	No.	%	No.	%
1892	4,217	50.23%	3,685	43.89%	494	5.88%
1896	5,315	57.40%	3,683	39.77%	262	2.83%
1900	5,609	61.15%	3,254	35.48%	309	3.37%
1904	5,804	64.52%	2,886	32.08%	305	3.39%
1908	4,989	55.09%	3,696	40.81%	371	4.10%
1912	3,283	41.63%	3,615	45.84%	988	12.53%
1916	4,718	56.29%	3,459	41.27%	205	2.45%
1920	9,638	80.92%	1,971	16.55%	302	2.54%
1924	5,714	40.33%	1,518	10.71%	6,937	48.96%
1928	10,052	59.85%	6,630	39.48%	112	0.67%
1932	5,986	37.60%	9,701	60.94%	232	1.46%
1936	7,196	41.11%	9,170	52.39%	1,137	6.50%
1940	11,143	59.40%	7,458	39.76%	158	0.84%
1944	10,226	62.56%	6,091	37.27%	28	0.17%
1948	8,299	55.00%	6,575	43.57%	215	1.42%
1952	14,327	77.21%	4,197	22.62%	32	0.17%
1956	11,648	68.69%	5,208	30.71%	102	0.60%
1960	11,564	60.05%	7,678	39.87%	16	0.08%
1964	7,872	45.74%	9,309	54.09%	30	0.17%
1968	10,789	62.49%	5,414	31.36%	1,061	6.15%
1972	11,873	62.29%	6,915	36.28%	273	1.43%
1976	12,016	54.11%	9,639	43.41%	552	2.49%
1980	13,298	55.82%	8,406	35.28%	2,120	8.90%
1984	13,430	62.58%	7,892	36.78%	138	0.64%
1988	10,049	51.32%	9,421	48.12%	110	0.56%
1992	7,678	33.16%	8,914	38.49%	6,565	28.35%
1996	7,021	36.54%	9,203	47.89%	2,991	15.57%
2000	10,240	46.64%	10,691	48.69%	1,025	4.67%
2004	12,208	48.32%	12,864	50.92%	192	0.76%
2008	9,068	37.29%	14,875	61.16%	377	1.55%
2012	10,255	42.29%	13,594	56.06%	399	1.65%
2016	12,350	50.68%	10,051	41.25%	1,967	8.07%
2020	14,142	55.22%	10,998	42.95%	468	1.83%
2024	15,922	58.31%	10,966	40.16%	418	1.53%

Grant County has been a reliably Republican county at the federal level for most of its existence. It had voted for the Democratic candidate for president six elections in a row, starting in 1992, before shifting back to the GOP in 2016.

== Communities ==
=== Cities ===
- Boscobel
- Cuba City (partly in Lafayette County)
- Fennimore
- Lancaster (county seat)
- Platteville

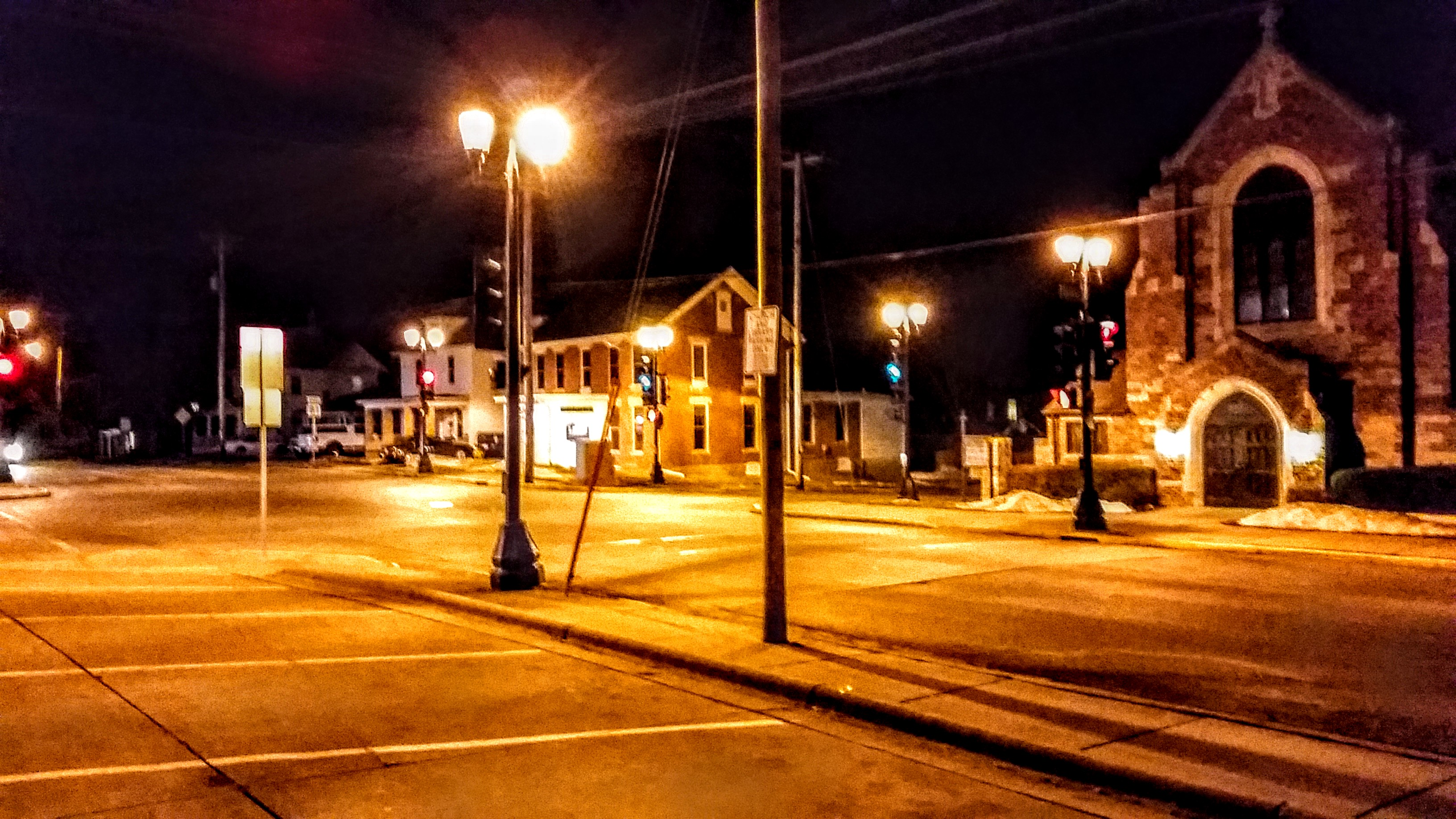
Downtown at night in Platteville

=== Villages ===
- Bagley
- Bloomington
- Blue River
- Cassville
- Dickeyville
- Hazel Green (partly in Lafayette County)
- Livingston (partly in Iowa County)
- Montfort (partly in Iowa County)
- Muscoda (partly in Iowa County)
- Mount Hope
- Patch Grove
- Potosi
- Tennyson
- Woodman

=== Towns ===
- Beetown
- Bloomington
- Boscobel
- Cassville
- Castle Rock
- Clifton
- Ellenboro
- Fennimore
- Glen Haven
- Harrison
- Hazel Green
- Hickory Grove
- Jamestown
- Liberty
- Lima
- Little Grant
- Marion
- Millville
- Mount Hope
- Mount Ida
- Muscoda
- North Lancaster
- Paris
- Patch Grove
- Platteville
- Potosi
- Smelser
- South Lancaster
- Waterloo
- Watterstown
- Wingville
- Woodman
- Wyalusing

=== Census-designated places ===
- Glen Haven
- Kieler
- Sandy Hook

=== Unincorporated communities ===
- Annaton
- Arthur
- Beetown
- Bigpatch
- British Hollow
- Brodtville
- Buena Vista
- Burton
- Castle Rock
- Centerville
- Cornelia
- Diamond Grove
- Ellenboro
- Elmo
- Fair Play
- Five Points
- Flora Fountain
- Georgetown
- Hickory Grove
- Homer
- Hurricane
- Lancaster Junction
- Louisburg
- McCartney
- Millville
- Mount Ida
- North Andover
- Prairie Corners
- Preston
- Rockville
- Rutledge
- Saint Rose
- Shady Dell
- Sinsinawa
- Stitzer
- Union
- Van Buren
- Werley
- Wyalusing

=== Ghost towns/neighborhoods ===
- Pleasant Ridge
- Sinnipee
- Fair Play

Fair play was founded by a prospector, rather than a farmer or logger, and within two years the prospector found ore, the settlement was built on the corner of Hwy 11 and Sandy Hook Road, the place was rather rowdy and fights based in greed was not uncommon, the place got its moniker when a violent fight broke out and one contender did not carry weapon, but the other man did, and thus the crowd started chanting 'Fair Play! Fair Play! Fair Play!' until the fight ended, and thus the village formerly known as 'Hard Town' was redubbed as 'Fair Play', in 1846, the last threatened duel took place and afterwards the settlement was abandoned.

- Paris

Paris was a settlement 1/8th of a mile South of 'Dickeyville' near Hwy 151/61 between 1838 and 1843, a small settlement built on the Platte River, the founder had malaria and he named the place after his homelands capital, Paris, (France), he built a bridge across the river that proved the counties first one made, the founder, Detantabaritz, had started experiencing financial issues, and he ended up facing a creditor, choosing swords as dueling weapons as he was himself a Dragoon, the creditor backed down, and later the founder took his own life due to debt anxieties, and now only a tavern remains, selling ribs.

== Notable people ==
- Willard H. Burney, member of the Nebraska House of Representatives
- B. W. Countryman, member of the South Dakota House of Representatives
- John Lewis Dyer, Methodist circuit rider missionary in Minnesota and Colorado; lead miner in Grant County prior to 1848
- William Garner Waddel, member of the South Dakota Senate

== See also ==
- National Register of Historic Places listings in Grant County, Wisconsin
- Upper Mississippi River National Wildlife and Fish Refuge
