= Carl Countryman =

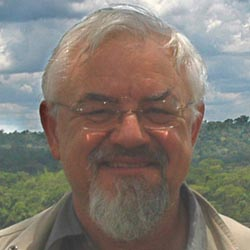
- Carl Countryman, 2004
- Born: Carl Countryman; August 19, 1946; San Francisco, California, United States
- Died: October 26, 2006 (aged 60); Arecibo, Puerto Rico
- Occupations: Inventor, audio engineer

Carl Countryman (August 19, 1946 – October 26, 2006) was president and Chief Engineer of Countryman & Associates of Menlo Park, California.

Countryman was most recognized for designing a number of complex and effective microphones for performance. He is best known for the E6 earset and Type 85 Direct Box. His work was nominated for the 2002 Technical Excellence & Creativity Awards.

Countryman engineered a number of devices that enabled the multimedia and psychedelic art scenes of the 1960s and 1970s. Multimedia artist Tony Martin (artist) cited Countryman's custom electronics as key to his cybernetic feedback art in the 1960s. Countryman's electronics coupled photosensors, microphones, and other electronics in two briefcases Martin could use as he staged shows in different cities. Martin cites Countryman's electronic innovations as crucial to his art. In the early 1970s, his piano pickups enabled the Grateful Dead's Keith Godchaux to use Steinway and Yamaha grand pianos as part of their famous Wall of Sound. The pickups worked similarly to condenser mics, allowing the musicians to produce "truly brilliant" sound compared to microphone amplification, according to Owsley Stanley. The pickup technology used the piano string itself as part of the circuit. The technology, developed for the Grateful Dead, became a part of many musical performers' rigs. Other custom amplification included a clavichord pickup built for keyboardist Jim Lowe.
