= Harold Percival Norton =

Rear Admiral in the United States Navy

- Born: November 4, 1855; New York, US
- Died: February 11, 1933 (aged 77); Washington, D.C., US
- Burial place: Arlington National Cemetery
- Military career
- Allegiance: United States
- Branch: United States Navy
- Rank: Rear Admiral
- Units: USS Swatara (1873); USS Albany (CL-23)

Harold Percival Norton (November 4, 1855 – February 11, 1933) was a rear admiral in the United States Navy.

== Biography ==
Norton was born on November 4, 1855, in New York. He married Mary Barbour in 1911. Norton died on February 11, 1933, in Washington, D.C., and is buried with Barbour at Arlington National Cemetery.

== Career ==
Norton was appointed a cadet engineer in 1874. He would go on to serve in England and the Republic of China, as well as aboard the USS Swatara (1873) and the USS Albany (CL-23).
