= Senator Cahill =

Senator Cahill may refer to:

- Máiría Cahill (born 1981), Seanad Éireann (Senate of Ireland)
- Meg Burton Cahill (born 1954), Arizona State Senate
- Pamela Cahill (fl. 1980s–2000s), Maine State Senate
- Pierce Cahill (1869–1935), South Dakota State Senate
- Terry H. Cahal (1802–1851), Tennessee State Senate
