= William John McCoy =

19th century American politician

William J. McCoy
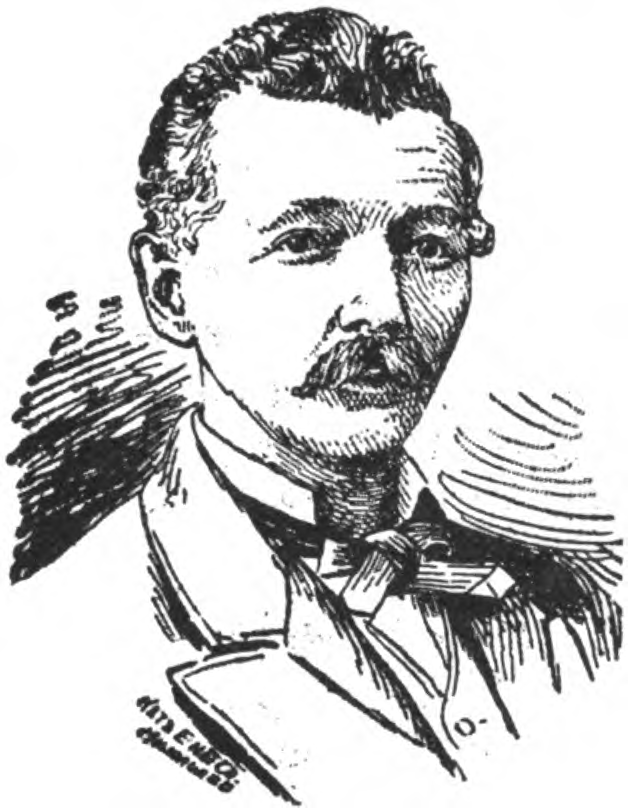
- Portrait from History of Grant County Wisconsin (1900)

Member of the Wisconsin State Assembly from the Grant 2nd district
- In office January 1, 1883 – January 3, 1887
- Preceded by: Daniel Bartlett Stevens
- Succeeded by: Reuben B. Showalter
- In office January 7, 1878 – January 6, 1879
- Preceded by: Joseph Bock
- Succeeded by: Joseph Trotter Mills

Member of the Wisconsin State Assembly from the Grant 4th district
- In office January 3, 1876 – January 1, 1877
- Preceded by: Delos Abrams
- Succeeded by: District abolished

Personal details
- Born: September 30, 1834 Argyle, New York, U.S.
- Died: June 28, 1897 (aged 62) Lancaster, Wisconsin, U.S.
- Resting place: Beetown Cemetery, Beetown, Wisconsin
- Party: Democratic
- Spouse: Julia Edwards (m. 1858–1897)

William John McCoy (September 30, 1834 – June 28, 1897) was an American farmer, Democratic politician, and Wisconsin pioneer. He served six years in the Wisconsin State Assembly, representing Grant County.

== Biography ==
McCoy was born on September 30, 1834, in Argyle, New York. He moved to Beetown, Wisconsin, in 1852 and to Lancaster, Wisconsin, in 1880. McCoy died on June 28, 1897.

== Career ==
McCoy was elected to the Assembly in 1875 and served four terms. Additionally, he was Chairman of the Beetown Board for five years between 1869 and 1876. He was a Democrat.

== Electoral history ==
=== Wisconsin Assembly (1875) ===
Wisconsin Assembly, Grant 4th District Election, 1875
Party	Candidate	Votes	%	±%
General Election, November 2, 1875
Democratic	William J. McCoy	735	55.06%	+12.72%
Republican	John Brackett	600	44.94%	
Plurality		135	10.11%	-5.22%
Total votes		1,335	100.0%	-0.67%
Democratic gain from Republican				

=== Wisconsin Assembly (1877) ===
Wisconsin Assembly, Grant 2nd District Election, 1877
Party	Candidate	Votes	%	±%
General Election, November 6, 1877
Democratic	William J. McCoy	922	45.92%	+0.56%
Republican	William B. Clark	721	35.91%	−16.94%
Greenback	Goodpel Lamson	365	18.18%	+16.38%
Plurality		201	10.01%	+2.52%
Total votes		2,008	100.0%	-24.79%
Democratic gain from Republican				

=== Wisconsin Assembly (1882, 1884, 1886) ===
Wisconsin Assembly, Grant 2nd District Election, 1882
Party	Candidate	Votes	%	±%
General Election, November 7, 1882
Democratic	William J. McCoy	1,335	61.24%	+20.52%
Republican	Daniel B. Stevens (incumbent)	795	36.47%	−20.69%
Greenback	Goodpel Lamson	50	2.29%	+0.17%
Plurality		540	24.77%	+8.34%
Total votes		2,180	100.0%	+54.39%
Democratic gain from Republican				

Wisconsin Assembly, Grant 2nd District Election, 1884
Party	Candidate	Votes	%	±%
General Election, November 4, 1884
Democratic	William J. McCoy (incumbent)	1,333	50.34%	−10.90%
Republican	Charles H. Baxter	1,235	46.64%	+10.17%
Prohibition	Ezra Abrams	80	3.02%	+0.17%
Plurality		98	3.70%	-21.07%
Total votes		2,648	100.0%	+21.47%
Democratic hold				

Wisconsin Assembly, Grant 2nd District Election, 1886
Party	Candidate	Votes	%	±%
General Election, November 2, 1886
Republican	Reuben B. Showalter	1,133	47.01%	+0.37%
Democratic	William J. McCoy (incumbent)	1,111	46.10%	−4.24%
Prohibition	Andrew Cairns	166	6.89%	+3.87%
Plurality		22	0.91%	-2.79%
Total votes		2,410	100.0%	-8.99%
Republican gain from Democratic				

Wisconsin State Assembly
Preceded by Delos Abrams	Member of the Wisconsin State Assembly from the Grant 4th district January 3, 1876 – January 1, 1877	District abolished
Preceded by Joseph Bock	Member of the Wisconsin State Assembly from the Grant 2nd district January 7, 1878 – January 6, 1879	Succeeded by Joseph Trotter Mills
Preceded by Daniel Bartlett Stevens	Member of the Wisconsin State Assembly from the Grant 2nd district January 1, 1883 – January 3, 1887	Succeeded by Reuben B. Showalter
