= Cheyenne Valley, Wisconsin =

Ghost town in Wisconsin

Cheyenne Valley
- Ghost town
- Location within Wisconsin
- Coordinates: 43.649767°N 90.350399°W
- Country: United States
- State: Wisconsin
- County: Vernon
- Established: 1855

Cheyenne Valley, Wisconsin was a former community in Vernon County, Wisconsin. It was a multi-racial community and is primarily known as a 19th-century rural African American settlement, which was the largest in the state.

It is now the site of Cheyenne Settlers Heritage Park in Hillsboro, Wisconsin (across from Mount Vernon Cemetery), and it contains a historical marker erected in 1997 by the Wisconsin Historical Society (no. 383).

== History ==
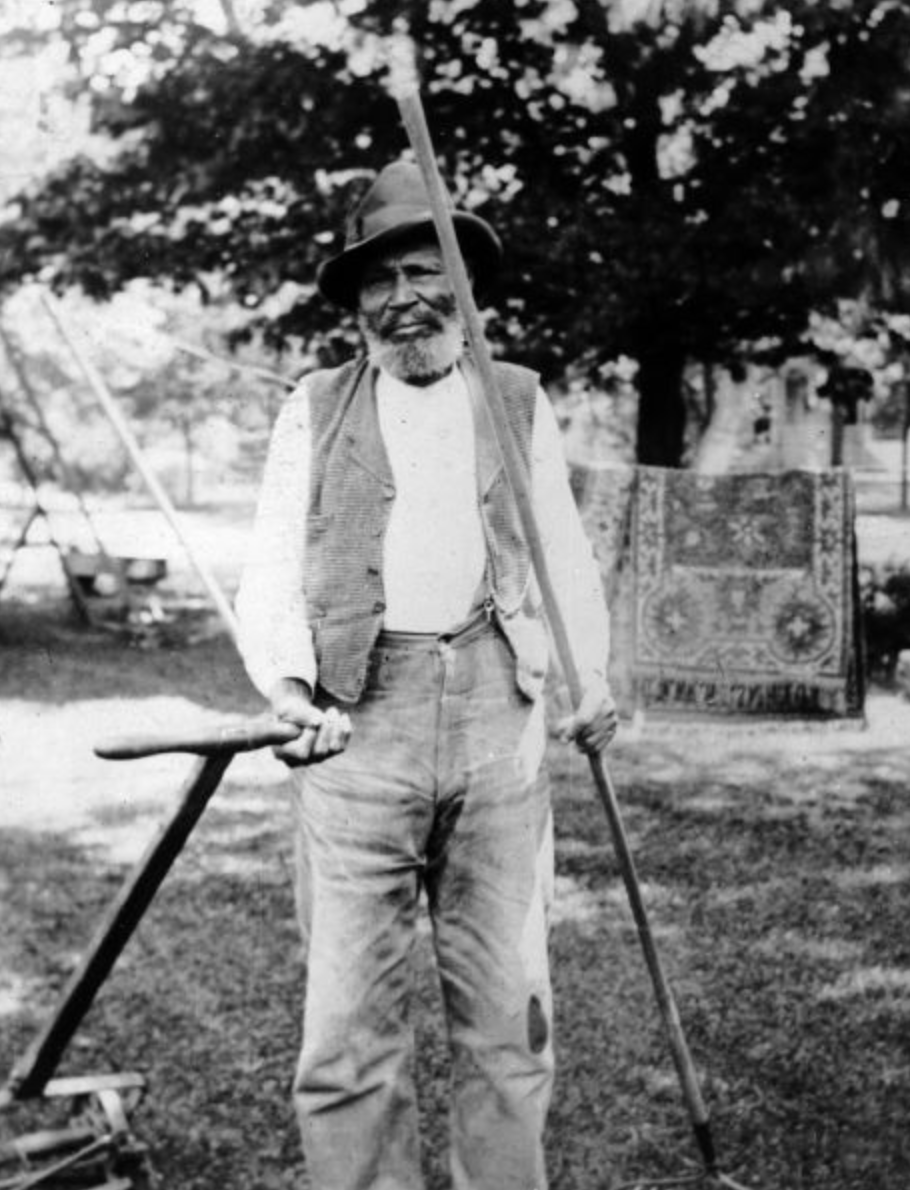
Wesley Barton

Cheyenne Valley, Wisconsin was named after a valley and is located off Wisconsin Highway 33, near Hillsboro and between Ontario and Hillsboro; the area had previously been a part of Forest, Vernon County, Wisconsin before its establishment of a new community. The settlement was created by nearly 150 African American settlers, who had moved north before the American Civil War with assistance by the Quakers. Most had worked as farmers in the area. Another early Black farming settlement had formed around the same time period in Pleasant Ridge near Lancaster in Grant County, Wisconsin.

The first settler was Walden Stewart in 1855, who was Black and born free in North Carolina. Stewart was followed by five more Black families to the area, including the Bartons (Wesley Barton), Revels (Micajah Revels), Roberts (Ishmael Roberts), Waldrons (Samuel Waldron), and Basses (Elijah Bass). A decade after the American Civil War had been a second wave of migration, which included in 1879 notable resident Thomas Shivers from Tennessee. By 1870 there were eleven Black families (and some 62 people) living in the area.

Early settler Wesley Barton (c. 1824–?), founded the settlement of Barton Corners (sometimes written as Barton's Corners), now known as Burr Corners in Vernon County. He also served as the first postmaster.

Alga “Algie” Shivers (1889–1978), the son of Thomas Shivers, built and/or designed at least fifteen round barns in the area.

== Modern history ==
For many years this was considered a "lost community" by historians, and it was brought forward in part through work by sociologist James Knox Phillips in the 1960s.

In 2008, descendants from the Cheyenne Valley community gathered at Cardinal Stritch University to discuss their upbringing.

The Cheyenne Valley Heritage Committee, and the Cheyenne Valley Heritage Road Tours are based in Hillsboro.
