= Joseph Bock =

American politician (1837–1925)

Member of the Wisconsin State Assembly from the Grant 2nd district
- In office January 3, 1876 – January 7, 1878
- Preceded by: Lafayette Caskey
- Succeeded by: Thomas J. Graham

Personal details
- Born: January 6, 1837 Alsace, France
- Died: March 14, 1925 (aged 88)
- Resting place: Hillside Cemetery, Lancaster, Wisconsin
- Party: Republican
- Spouse: Abbie A. Bock

Military service
- Allegiance: United States
- Branch/service: United States Volunteers; Union Army
- Years of service: 1861–1864
- Rank: Private, USV
- Unit: 2nd Reg. Wis. Vol. Infantry
- Battles/wars: American Civil War

Joseph Bock (January 6, 1837 – March 14, 1925) was an Alsatian American politician, banker, and real estate broker. He served two terms in the Wisconsin State Assembly, representing Grant County. During the American Civil War, he served in the Iron Brigade of the Army of the Potomac.

== Biography ==
Bock was born on January 6, 1837, in the Alsace region of the Kingdom of France. In 1857, Bock emigrated to the United States. He settled first at St. Louis, Missouri, then, later that year, moved to Cassville, Wisconsin.

During the American Civil War, Bock served in the 2nd Wisconsin Infantry Regiment. Engagements he took part in include the First Battle of Bull Run and the Battle of Fredericksburg. He went on to be wounded in both thighs. Although he initially remained with the regiment, his injuries eventually left him unable to continue.

He died on March 14, 1925, and was buried in Hillside Cemetery in Lancaster, Wisconsin.

== Political career ==
Bock was a member of the Assembly from 1876 to 1877. Previously, he was Register of Deeds of Grant County, Wisconsin. He was a Republican.

== See also ==
- Joseph Bock at Find a Grave
- RootsWeb

Wisconsin State Assembly
Preceded by Lafayette Caskey	Member of the Wisconsin State Assembly from the Grant 2nd district January 3, 1876 – January 7, 1878	Succeeded by Thomas J. Graham
