= William Carter (Wisconsin politician) =

American politician

William E. Carter (November 17, 1833 – August 15, 1905) was a member of the Wisconsin State Assembly.

== Biography ==
Carter was born William Edward Carter in Piecombe, Sussex, England on November 17, 1833. He moved to Lancaster, Wisconsin in 1850 with his parents and to Platteville, Wisconsin in 1861. He was admitted to the Wisconsin bar and practiced law in Platteville, Wisconsin. In 1895, he moved to Milwaukee, Wisconsin where he practiced law. Carter died on August 15, 1905, in Milwaukee, Wisconsin, and was buried in Lancaster.

== Career ==
Carter was a member of the Assembly from 1877 to 1879. He was a Republican.
