= Daniel Bartlett Stevens =

American politician (1837–1924)

Daniel B. Stevens
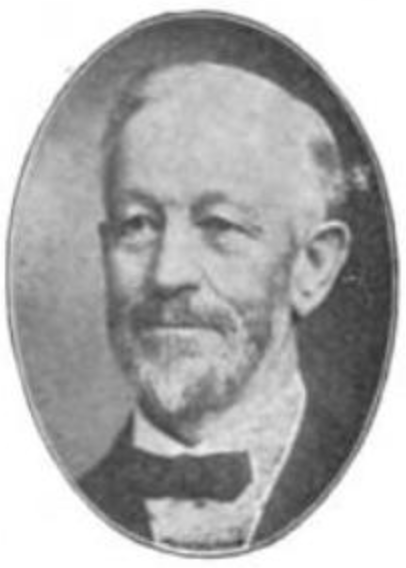

Member of the Wisconsin State Assembly
- In office January 4, 1909 – January 6, 1913
- Preceded by: Edward A. Everett
- Succeeded by: District abolished
- Constituency: Iron–Oneida–Vilas district
- In office January 2, 1882 – January 1, 1883
- Preceded by: Henry S. Keene
- Succeeded by: William John McCoy
- Constituency: Grant 2nd district

Personal details
- Born: January 24, 1837 Paris, Maine, U.S.
- Died: February 3, 1924 (aged 87) St. Maries, Idaho, U.S.
- Resting place: Cassville Cemetery, Cassville, Wisconsin
- Party: Republican
- Children: Willard T. Stevens^{(b. 1866; died 1937)}; Frank J. Stevens^{(b. 1869; died 1929)}
- Occupation: Lumber manufacturing

Daniel Bartlett Stevens (January 24, 1837 – February 3, 1924) was an American businessman and Republican politician. He served 5 years in the Wisconsin State Assembly.

== Biography ==
Stevens was born on January 24, 1837, in Paris, Maine. He moved to Prairie du Chien, Wisconsin, in 1838. Stevens died in 1924 in St. Maries, Idaho.

His son, Willard T. Stevens, was a member of the Wisconsin State Senate.

== Career ==
Stevens was twice a member of the Assembly. He was first elected to the Assembly in 1882 and again in 1908 and 1910. Additionally, Stevens was the town clerk of Beetown, Wisconsin. He was a Republican.
