= Beetown (community), Wisconsin =

Beetown, Wisconsin
- Unincorporated community
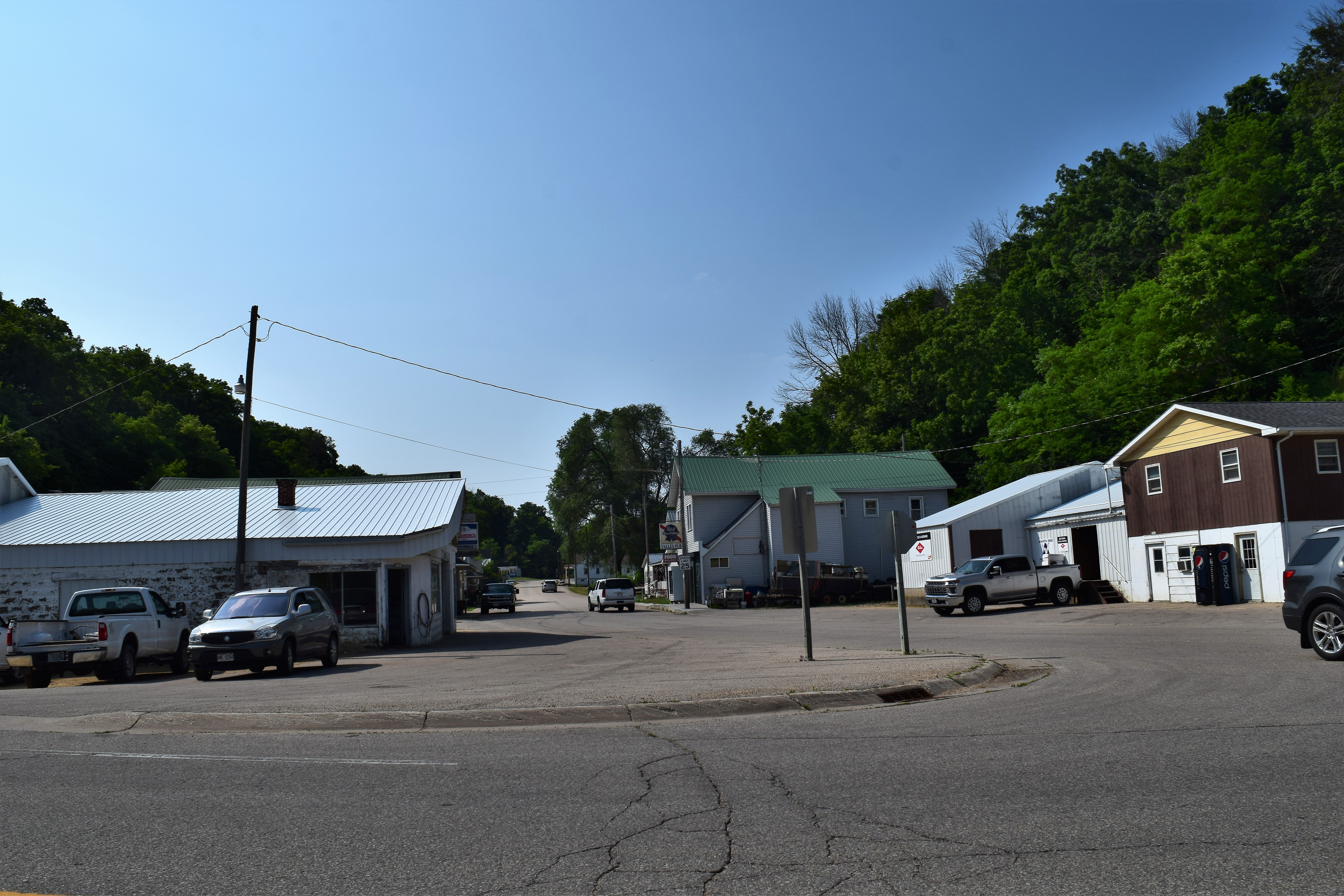
- Looking north at Beetown from WIS 81

- Location within Wisconsin Location within the United States
- Coordinates: 42°47′42″N 90°53′07″W
- Country: United States
- State: Wisconsin
- County: Grant
- Town: Beetown
- Elevation: 810 ft (250 m)
- Time zone: UTC-6 (Central (CST))
  - Summer (DST): UTC-5 (CDT)
- Area code: 608
- GNIS feature ID: 1561503

Beetown is an unincorporated community in the town of Beetown, Grant County, Wisconsin, United States. Wisconsin Highway 81 passes through the community.

== History ==
The settlement was first surveyed in 1847 or 1848. The community had become prosperous by 1850, boasting three hotels, but a combination of the Gold Rush and an outbreak of cholera nearly depopulated the community.

The community got its name from settler Cyrus Alexander, who discovered a 425 pounds (193 kg) block of lead under a bee tree in 1827. He named his find bee lead, which eventually became Beetown's name as well.
