= Charles H. Baxter =

American businessman and politician

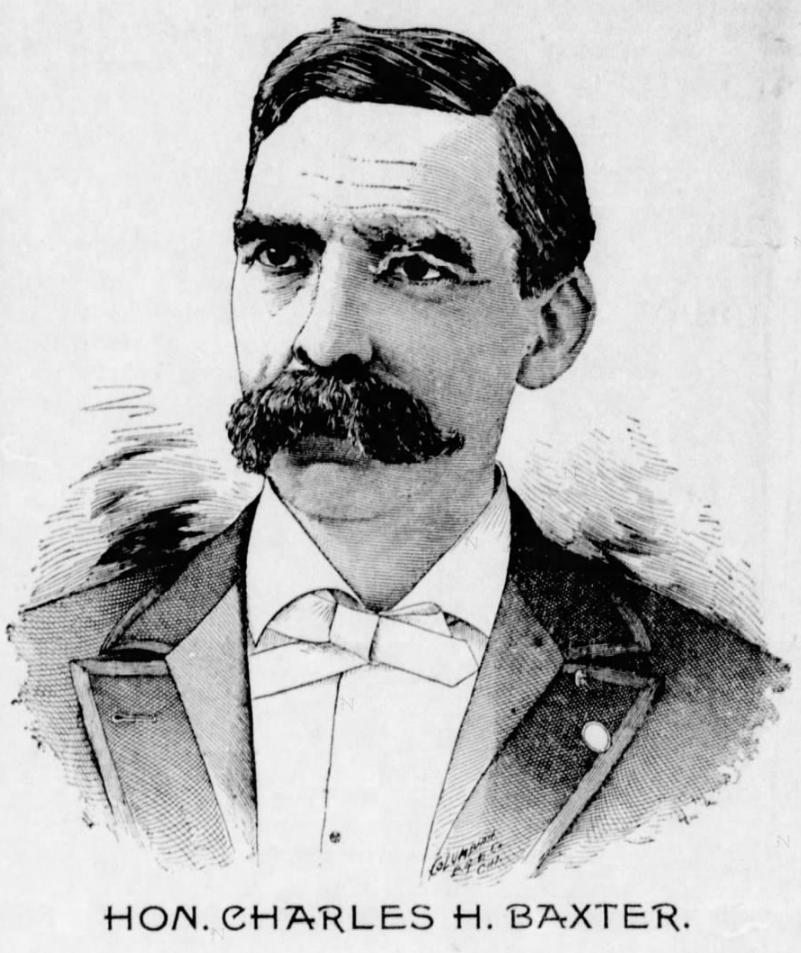
- Portrait of Charles H. Baxter from an 1898 campaign advertisement.

Member of the Wisconsin Senate from the 16th district
- In office January 2, 1893 – January 7, 1901
- Preceded by: Edward I. Kidd
- Succeeded by: Edward E. Burns

7th Mayor of Lancaster, Wisconsin
- In office April 1888 – April 1889
- Preceded by: John Schreiner
- Succeeded by: Reuben B. Showalter

Personal details
- Born: November 15, 1841 Stillwater, New York, U.S.
- Died: December 23, 1923 (aged 82) Lancaster, Wisconsin, U.S.
- Party: Republican
- Spouse: Maria Howe (m. 1865–1923)
- Children: George Hiram Baxter; ^{born 1866; died 1932}; Laura Ann (Brown); ^{born 1870; died 1954}; Martha (Bennett); ^{born 1881; died 1967}

Military service
- Allegiance: United States
- Branch/service: United States Army; Union Army
- Years of service: 1862–1865
- Rank: Captain, USV
- Unit: 25th Reg. Wis. Vol. Infantry; 41st Reg. Wis. Vol. Infantry; 47th Reg. Wis. Vol. Infantry
- Battles/wars: American Civil War: Siege of Vicksburg; Second Battle of Memphis

Charles Henry Baxter (November 15, 1841 – December 23, 1923) was an American businessman, banker, and progressive Republican politician. He served eight years in the Wisconsin State Senate, representing Grant County and neighboring municipalities, and was the 7th mayor of Lancaster, Wisconsin. He also served as a Union Army officer in the American Civil War.

== Biography ==
Born in Stillwater, New York, Baxter moved to Grant County, Wisconsin, with his parents in 1857, where his father became a prominent physician. He was educated in public schools in New York and Wisconsin, and, in 1861, went to work as a clerk in the store of George Howe, in Lancaster, Wisconsin. Within a year, however, he decided to volunteer for service in the American Civil War.

== Civil War service ==
Baxter originally enrolled in Lancaster with Company C of the 25th Wisconsin Infantry Regiment, composed mostly of volunteers from the counties of southwest Wisconsin. The regiment was organized at La Crosse, Wisconsin, and mustered into service on September 14, 1862. Before they could join the Civil War, they were ordered to proceed west to Minnesota to provide security for Minnesota settlers in the midst of an ongoing Sioux uprising.

In December 1862, the regiment concluded its business in Minnesota and returned to Wisconsin, with new orders to proceed south to attach to XVI Corps for service in the Western Theater of the American Civil War. They joined the Siege of Vicksburg from June through July 1863, and were then assigned to guard duty in eastern Kansas. The regiment suffered from a severe wave of malaria during this summer, and ultimately lost over 400 men to illness. Baxter was one of the men effected by disease, and, in August 1863, was discharged back to Wisconsin.

He spent the remainder of the year home in Lancaster recovering from his illness, but in the spring of 1864, he re-enlisted with Company A of the 41st Wisconsin Infantry Regiment. The regiment mustered into service in June 1864, and was assigned to Memphis, Tennessee, where they engaged in picket duty, defending railroads and supply lines.

While serving at Memphis, Baxter was detached from the regiment and served as an adjutant to General Cadwallader C. Washburn. The only fighting they saw at Memphis was on August 21, 1864, when a detachment of cavalry under General Nathan Bedford Forrest raided the city in an unsuccessful attempt to capture General Washburn and the two other generals stationed there. The regiments were 100-day enlistments, and as such mustered out in September 1864.

Baxter chose to return for another tour with the 47th Wisconsin Infantry Regiment. This time he was commissioned as captain of Company K in that regiment. They proceeded to Louisville, Kentucky, in February 1865, and then to Nashville, Tennessee, and Tullahoma. The regiment was assigned to guard duty, and was often dispersed in small units around middle Tennessee, leaving Captain Baxter in command at the regimental headquarters. Later he was detached from the regiment and made chief of ordinance for the Middle District of Tennessee on the staff of General Robert H. Milroy, and then his successor General Horatio P. Van Cleve. The war came to an end while Baxter was serving in this role, and he mustered out September 8, 1865.

== Postbellum career ==
On returning to Lancaster, Baxter again went to work with his earlier employer, George Howe, in a firm known as "Howe & Baxter". Baxter married Howe's daughter and took over the business after Howe retired, renaming it "Charles H. Baxter & Co." They ran a broad merchandising business, and dealt in lumber, coal, and livestock until Baxter's retirement in 1895. After his retirement, he was elected vice president of the State Bank of Grant County and later became president of the bank.

Baxter was an active and prominent member of the Republican Party of Wisconsin, serving for 20 years as chairman of the Grant County Republican Central Committee, and serving eight years on the State Party Central Committee. He served on the Grant County Board of Supervisors and the Lancaster village board. After Lancaster was incorporated as a city, Baxter was the 7th elected Mayor of the city, serving in 1888.

He was the Republican candidate for Wisconsin State Assembly in Grant County's 2nd Assembly district in 1884, but fell 98 votes short of incumbent State Representative William John McCoy. Eight years later, he was elected to the Wisconsin State Senate, and was re-elected in 1896, serving from 1893 through 1900.

In the Senate, he was chairman of the Joint Committee on Claims from 1895 through 1900. He also served on the committees for state affairs, banking, insurance, and military affairs.

He continued to work at the State Bank of Grant County until its merger with Meyer-Showalter State Bank in 1903, at which point he became vice president of the new merged company—Union State Bank. In 1912, he became president of the bank, and continued in that role until his death in 1923.

== Personal life and family ==
Charles H. Baxter married Maria Howe, the daughter of his business partner, on February 20, 1865. They had three children together. At the time of his death, his wife and children were all still living, as well as three grandchildren.

== Electoral history ==
=== Wisconsin Assembly (1884) ===
Wisconsin Assembly, Grant 2nd District Election, 1884
Party	Candidate	Votes	%	±%
General Election, November 4, 1884
Democratic	William John McCoy (incumbent)	1,333	50.34%	−10.90%
Republican	Charles H. Baxter	1,235	46.64%	+10.17%
Prohibition	Ezra Abrams	80	3.02%	
Plurality		98	3.70%	-21.07%
Total votes		2,648	100.0%	+21.47%
Democratic hold				

=== Wisconsin Senate (1892, 1896) ===
Wisconsin Senate, 16th District Election, 1892
Party	Candidate	Votes	%	±%
General Election, November 8, 1892
Republican	Charles H. Baxter	5,972	53.36%	+1.16%
Democratic	Jacob Bremer	5,211	46.56%	+3.85%
	Scattering	8	0.07%	
Plurality		761	6.80%	-2.69%
Total votes		11,191	100.0%	-3.90%
Republican hold				

Wisconsin Senate, 16th District Election, 1896
Party	Candidate	Votes	%	±%
General Election, November 3, 1896
Republican	Charles H. Baxter	8,440	53.36%	+6.21%
Democratic	Morton Dustman	5,727	46.56%	−6.14%
Plurality		2,713	19.15%	+12.35%
Total votes		14,167	100.0%	+26.59%
Republican hold				

Wisconsin Senate
Preceded by Edward I. Kidd	Member of the Wisconsin Senate from the 16th district January 2, 1893 – January 7, 1901	Succeeded by Edward E. Burns
Political offices
Preceded by John Schreiner	Mayor of Lancaster, Wisconsin; April 1888 – April 1889	Succeeded by Reuben B. Showalter
