= Thomas McDonald Jr. =

American politician

Thomas McDonald Jr. was a member of the Wisconsin State Assembly. He was born on February 24, 1865, in Lancaster, Wisconsin. He later became a merchant and an insurance solicitor. He was elected to the Assembly in 1896 and 1898. He was a Republican.
