= Reuben B. Showalter =

19th century American politician

Member of the Wisconsin State Assembly from the Grant 2nd district
- In office January 3, 1887 – January 5, 1891
- Preceded by: William John McCoy
- Succeeded by: John J. Oswald

8th Mayor of Lancaster, Wisconsin
- In office April 1889 – April 1890
- Preceded by: Charles H. Baxter
- Succeeded by: Edward M. Lowry

Personal details
- Born: June 3, 1842 Smithfield, Pennsylvania, U.S.
- Died: January 27, 1912 (aged 69) Lancaster, Wisconsin, U.S.
- Resting place: Hillside Cemetery, Lancaster, Wisconsin
- Party: Republican
- Spouse: Martha Jane Arthur (m. 1868–1912)
- Children: at least 3
- Occupation: Mason, banker

Military service
- Allegiance: United States
- Branch/service: United States Volunteers; Union Army
- Years of service: 1864–1865
- Rank: Private, USV
- Unit: 2nd Reg. Wis. Vol. Cavalry
- Battles/wars: American Civil War

Reuben Benoni Showalter (June 3, 1842 – January 27, 1912) was an American mason, banker, and Republican politician from Grant County, Wisconsin. He was a member of the Wisconsin State Assembly during the 1887 and 1889 sessions, and served as the 8th mayor of Lancaster, Wisconsin.

== Biography ==
Showalter was born on June 3, 1842, in Smithfield, Pennsylvania. He would later reside in Lancaster, Wisconsin, Richland County, Wisconsin and Beetown, Wisconsin. During the American Civil War, he served with the 2nd Wisconsin Cavalry Regiment of the Union Army. Showalter later became a bank president.

== Political career ==
Showalter was elected to the Assembly in 1886 and 1888. Other positions he held include alderman and Mayor of Lancaster and Chairman Grant County, Wisconsin board of supervisors. He was a Republican.

== Personal life and family ==
Reuben Showalter was the last of six children born to Reuben K. Showalter and his wife Rachel (née Brownfield) Showalter. His father died when he was a young child, and he moved with his mother and siblings to a farm in the town of Lancaster, in Grant County, Wisconsin.

Two of Showalter's older brothers also served in the Union Army. His brother John was an officer in the same company as Reuben, Company C of the 2nd Wisconsin Cavalry Regiment. His eldest brother, Levi, was second lieutenant of Company C in the 2nd Wisconsin Infantry Regiment and was wounded at Gettysburg.

Reuben married Martha Jane Arthur in 1868. They had at least three children together, though only two survived to adulthood.

Reuben Showalter died on January 27, 1912, after a period of declining health. He was interred at Lancaster's Hillside Cemetery.

Wisconsin State Assembly
Preceded by William John McCoy	Member of the Wisconsin State Assembly from the Grant 2nd district January 3, 1887 – January 5, 1891	Succeeded by John J. Oswald
Political offices
Preceded by Charles H. Baxter	Mayor of Lancaster, Wisconsin; April 1889 – April 1890	Succeeded by Edward M. Lowry
