= L. J. Arthur House =

Historic house in Wisconsin, United States

- U.S. National Register of Historic Places
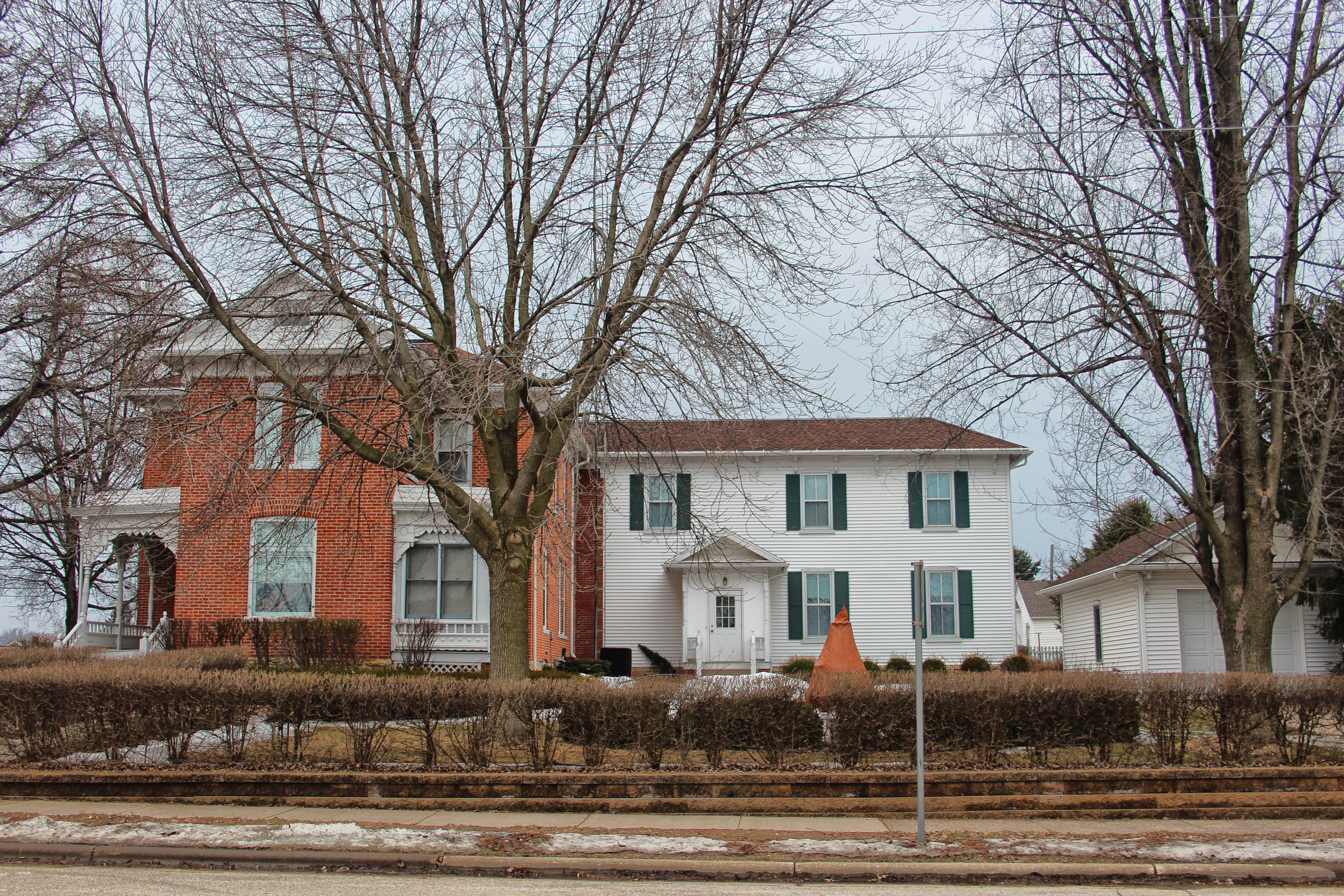
- L. J. Arthur House

- Location within Wisconsin
- Location: 210 N. Jefferson St., Lancaster, Wisconsin
- Coordinates: 42°50′57″N 90°42′39″W
- Area: 0.5 acres (0.20 ha)
- Built: 1880
- Built by: George Benn
- NRHP reference No.: 85001951
- Added to NRHP: September 5, 1985

The L. J. Arthur House is a historic house at 210 N. Jefferson Street in Lancaster, Wisconsin.

== History ==
The house was built in 1880 for L. J. Arthur, a local attorney. Builder George Benn designed the house, which exhibits Victorian building trends but does not fall under a specific architectural style. The two-story house has a T-shaped plan with a red brick exterior, ornate wooden porches, two bay windows, and bracketed eaves. Merchant Charles Basford bought the house from Arthur in 1889 and lived there until the 1920s; it has since been used as a boarding house and a restaurant.

The house was listed on the National Register of Historic Places in 1980 and on the State Register of Historic Places in 1989.
