= Lancaster Post Office =

Historic building in Wisconsin, US

- U.S. National Register of Historic Places
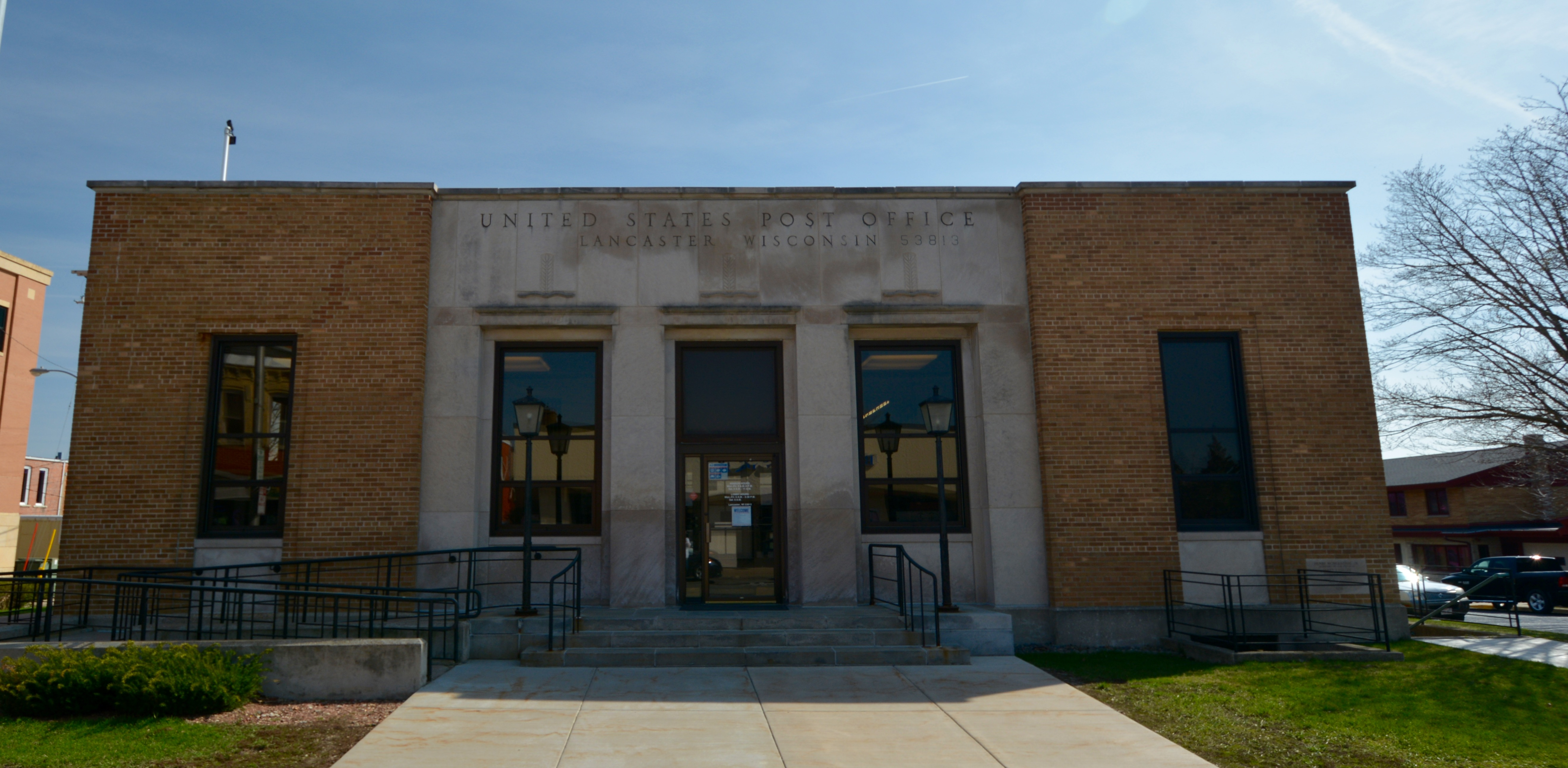
- Lancaster Post Office

- Location within Wisconsin Location within the United States
- Location: 236 W. Maple St., Lancaster, Wisconsin
- Coordinates: 42°50′52″N 90°42′43″W
- Area: less than one acre
- Built: 1938
- Architect: Louis A. Simon
- Architectural style: Streamline Moderne
- MPS: United States Post Office Construction in Wisconsin MPS
- NRHP reference No.: 00001245
- Added to NRHP: October 24, 2000

The Lancaster Post Office is a historic post office at 236 W. Maple Street in Lancaster, Wisconsin.

== History ==
The Lancaster Post Office opened in 1938, with George H. Cox serving as its first postmaster. It was one of several Wisconsin post offices built by the Public Works Administration in the 1930s; as the PWA commonly reused building designs, it was nearly identical to the Lake Geneva post office. In 1940, artist Tom Rost painted a mural on the interior as part of the Public Works of Art Project. Rost also painted murals in post offices in Elkhorn, Wisconsin and Paoli, Indiana, and he worked as an artist for the Milwaukee Journal in the 1930s. His mural in Lancaster, titled Farm Yard, depicts farmers working on a large hay wagon alongside chickens and pigs.
