= Lancaster Municipal Airport =

- IATA: none; ICAO: none; FAA LID: 73C

Summary
- Airport type: Public
- Owner: City of Lancaster
- Serves: Lancaster, Wisconsin
- Opened: April 1967
- Time zone: CST (UTC−06:00)
  - Summer (DST): CDT (UTC−05:00)
- Elevation AMSL: 1,016 ft / 310 m
- Coordinates: 42°46′57″N 090°40′52″W

Map
- Location of airport in Wisconsin 73C (the United States)

Runways
Direction	Length		Surface
Direction	ft	m	Surface
18/36	3,300	1,006	Asphalt

Statistics
- Aircraft operations (2024): 8,400
- Based aircraft (2024): 8
- Source: Federal Aviation Administration

Lancaster Municipal Airport (FAA LID: 73C) is a city owned public use airport located four nautical miles (5 mi, 7 km) south of the central business district of Lancaster, a city in Grant County, Wisconsin, United States. It is included in the Federal Aviation Administration (FAA) National Plan of Integrated Airport Systems for 2025–2029, in which it is categorized as an unclassified general aviation facility.

== Facilities and aircraft ==
Lancaster Municipal Airport covers an area of 27 acres (11 ha) at an elevation of 1,016 feet (310 m) above mean sea level. It has one runway designated 18/36 with an asphalt surface measuring 3,300 by 60 feet (1,006 x 18 m).

For the 12-month period ending May 22, 2024, the airport had 8,400 general aviation aircraft operations, an average of 23 per day. In July 2024, there were 8 aircraft based at this airport: 6 single-engine, 1 helicopter and 1 glider.

== See also ==
- List of airports in Wisconsin
