= Forest, Vernon County, Wisconsin =

Forest, Wisconsin
- Town
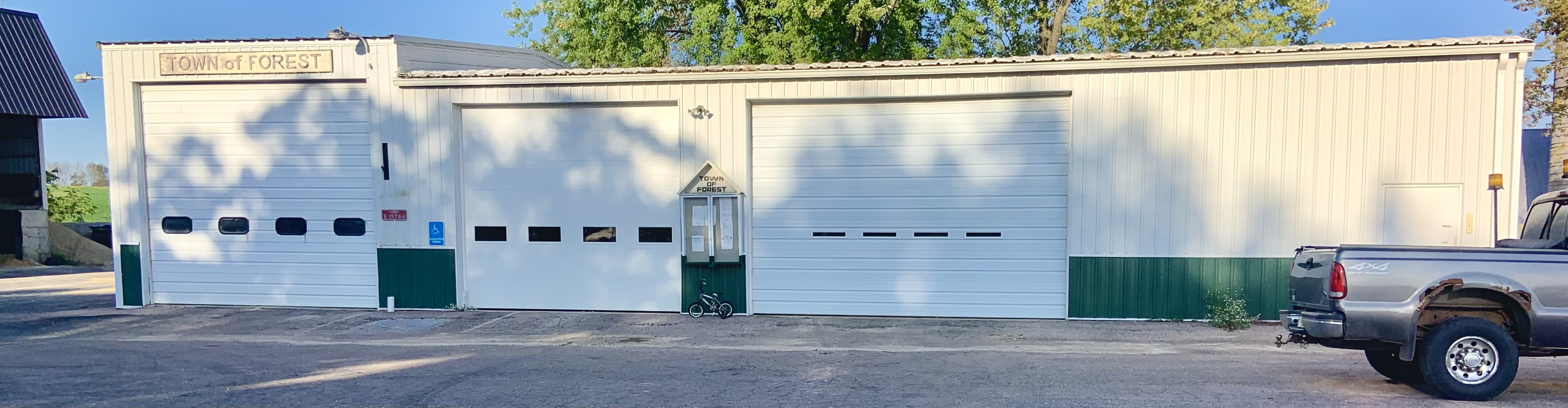
- Town hall

- Location in Vernon County and the state of Wisconsin.
- Coordinates: 43°40′46″N 90°30′54″W
- Country: United States
- State: Wisconsin
- County: Vernon

Area
  - Total: 35.9 sq mi (93.1 km^{2})
  - Land: 35.9 sq mi (93.1 km^{2})
  - Water: 0 sq mi (0.0 km^{2})
- Elevation: 980 ft (300 m)

Population (2020)
  - Total: 617
  - Density: 17.2/sq mi (6.63/km^{2})
- Time zone: UTC-6 (Central (CST))
  - Summer (DST): UTC-5 (CDT)
- Area code: 608
- FIPS code: 55-26550
- GNIS feature ID: 1583216
- Website: http://www.townofforest.com

Forest is a town in Vernon County, Wisconsin, United States. The population was 617 at the 2020 census. The unincorporated communities of Dilly, Mount Tabor, and Valley are in the town.

One of the earliest Black settlers in Forest was Wesley Barton (when the area was formerly known as Cheyenne Valley).

== Geography ==
According to the United States Census Bureau, the town has a total area of 36.0 square miles (93.1 km^{2}), all land.

== Demographics ==
As of the census of 2000, there were 583 people, 199 households, and 159 families residing in the town. The population density was 16.2 people per square mile (6.3/km^{2}). There were 258 housing units at an average density of 7.2 per square mile (2.8/km^{2}). The racial makeup of the town was 97.08% White, and 2.92% from two or more races.

There were 199 households, out of which 36.2% had children under the age of 18 living with them, 72.4% were married couples living together, 4.5% had a female householder with no husband present, and 20.1% were non-families. 16.6% of all households were made up of individuals, and 7.5% had someone living alone who was 65 years of age or older. The average household size was 2.93 and the average family size was 3.31.

In the town, the population was spread out, with 30.4% under the age of 18, 7.9% from 18 to 24, 25.9% from 25 to 44, 24.4% from 45 to 64, and 11.5% who were 65 years of age or older. The median age was 36 years. For every 100 females, there were 101.0 males. For every 100 females age 18 and over, there were 103.0 males.

The median income for a household in the town was $35,982, and the median income for a family was $40,556. Males had a median income of $26,250 versus $18,281 for females. The per capita income for the town was $13,583. About 10.0% of families and 15.8% of the population were below the poverty line, including 24.8% of those under age 18 and 12.7% of those age 65 or over.

== See also ==
- Forest, Richland County, Wisconsin
