= Willard T. Stevens =

American politician

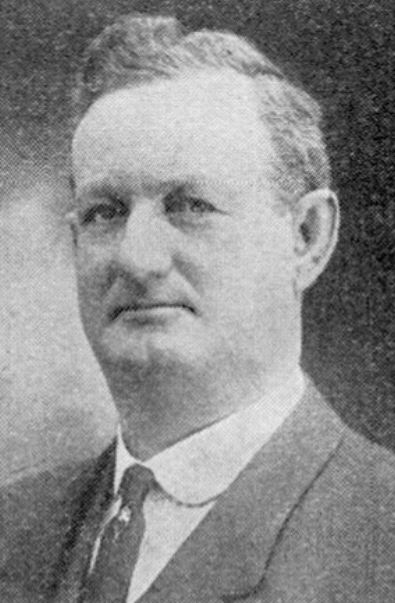

Member of the Wisconsin State Senate
- In office 1912–1918

Personal details
- Born: September 6, 1865 Beetown, Wisconsin, US
- Died: April 26, 1937 (aged 71) Rhinelander, Wisconsin, US
- Party: Republican
- Spouse: Katherine Grimm (m. 1888)
- Parent: Daniel Bartlett Stevens (father)

Willard T. Stevens (September 6, 1865 – April 26, 1937) was a member of the Wisconsin State Senate.

== Biography ==
Stevens was born on September 6, 1865, in Beetown, Wisconsin. His father, Daniel Bartlett Stevens, was a member of the Wisconsin State Assembly. On July 11, 1888, Stevens married Katherine Grimm. He died in Rhinelander, Wisconsin, in 1937.

== Career ==
Stevens was elected to the Senate in 1912 and remained a member until 1918. Previously, he was elected Sheriff of Oneida County, Wisconsin, in 1896 and re-elected in 1906 and was a member of the Wisconsin Republican Committee from 1904 to 1906.
