= Edward E. Burns =

American politician (1858–1941)

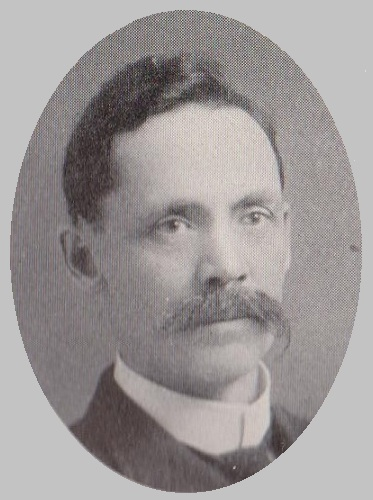

Member of the Wisconsin Senate from the 16th district
- In office 1901–1908
- Preceded by: Charles H. Baxter
- Succeeded by: John J. Blaine

Personal details
- Born: January 20, 1858 East Dubuque, Illinois
- Died: June 15, 1941 (aged 83) Galena, Illinois
- Party: Republican
- Profession: Politician

Edward Eugene Burns (January 20, 1858 – June 15, 1941) was an American lawyer from Platteville, Wisconsin, who served as a Republican member of the Wisconsin State Senate.

== Background ==
O'Neil was born in what would later become East Dubuque, Illinois, on January 20, 1858. Shortly after he was born, his family moved to Jamestown, Wisconsin, and settled on a farm where he grew up. He attended the Platteville Normal School, later the University of Wisconsin–Platteville; and the University of Wisconsin Law School, graduating in the class of 1887. He practiced law for one year in Boscobel, Wisconsin, then moving to Platteville on December 1, 1890. Burns died on June 15, 1941, while visiting his brother in Galena, Illinois.

== Elected office and military service ==
He was elected a member of the county board in 1895 and 1896, and was the city attorney of Platteville in 1897 and 1898.

In 1898, he entered the Army for two years and served in the Spanish–American War as Captain of Company C of the 4th Wisconsin Infantry Regiment.

He was elected to the Wisconsin State Senate's 16th District (Grant and Iowa Counties) on November 6, 1900 (Republican incumbent Charles H. Baxter was not a candidate), beating Democrat William Synon and Prohibitionist John W. Horsfall; and was re-elected in 1904. He was succeeded in 1909 by John J. Blaine, also a Republican.
