= A. H. Kemper =

American politician

Adolph H. Kemper (September 6, 1880 – July 2, 1954) was a member of the South Dakota House of Representatives.

== Biography ==
Kemper was born on September 6, 1880, in Lancaster, Wisconsin. He died in a traffic accident on July 2, 1954, in Salem, South Dakota.

== Career ==
Kemper was a member of the South Dakota House of Representatives from 1941 to 1944. He was a Republican. Kemper was elected from Sioux Falls, where he had lived.
