= Beetown, Wisconsin =

Town of Beetown
- Town
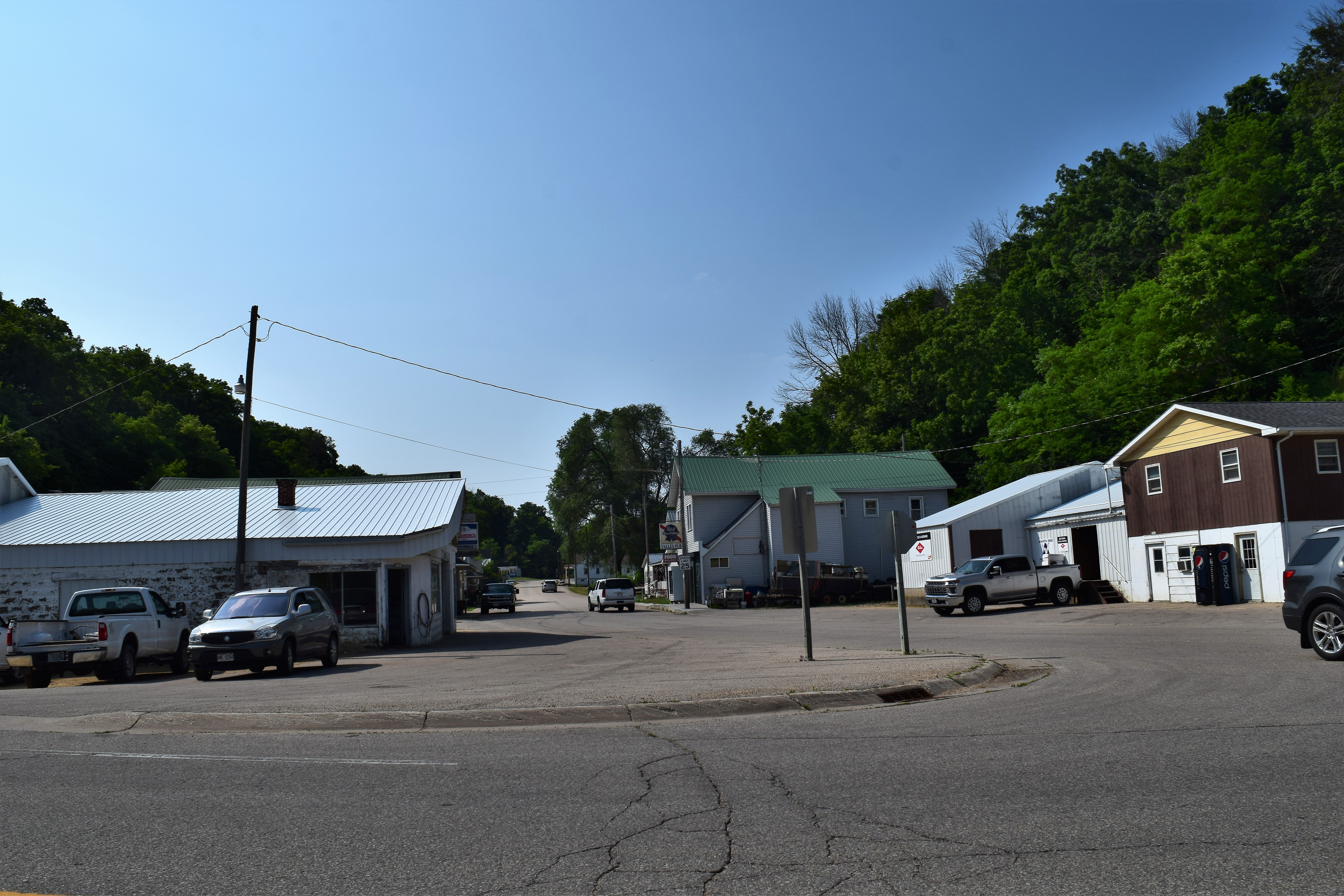
- The community of Beetown within the town

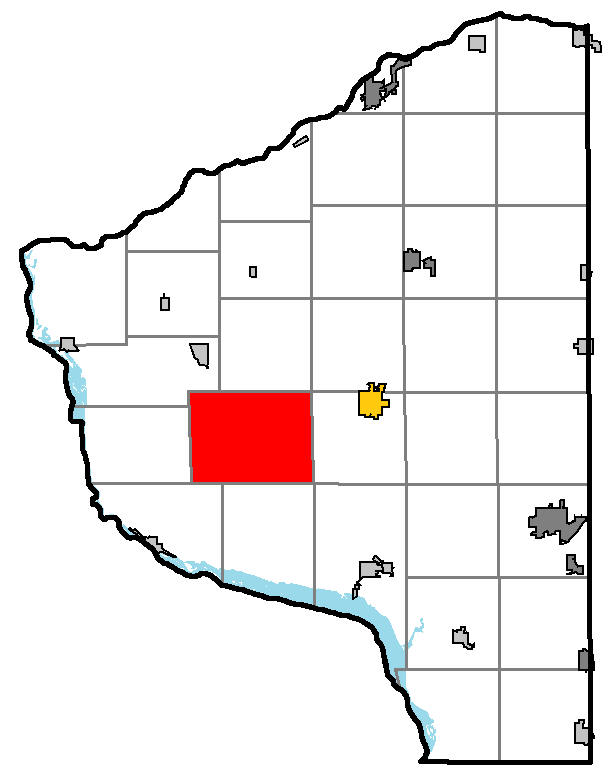
- Location of the Town of Beetown, within Grant County, Wisconsin
- Coordinates: 42°48′27″N 90°51′58″W
- Country: United States
- State: Wisconsin
- County: Grant

Area
  - Total: 48.4 sq mi (125.4 km^{2})
  - Land: 48.4 sq mi (125.4 km^{2})
  - Water: 0 sq mi (0.0 km^{2})
- Elevation: 899 ft (274 m)

Population (2020)
  - Total: 723
  - Density: 14.9/sq mi (5.77/km^{2})
- Time zone: UTC-6 (Central (CST))
  - Summer (DST): UTC-5 (CDT)
- Area code: 608
- FIPS code: 55-06100
- GNIS feature ID: 1582780
- Website: https://www.townofbeetown.com/

The Town of Beetown is located in Grant County, Wisconsin, United States. The population was 723 at the 2020 census. The unincorporated communities of Beetown, Diamond Grove, Five Points, Flora Fountain, Hurricane, and North Andover are located in the town. The former community of Pleasant Ridge was also located in the town. Brad Moore has been the mayor since 2003.

== History ==
Local settler Cyrus Alexander discovered a 425 pounds (193 kg) block of lead under a bee tree, naming it bee lead, which eventually spawned the name of the town.

== Geography ==
According to the United States Census Bureau, the town has a total area of 48.4 square miles (125.4 km^{2}), all land.

== Demographics ==
At the 2000 census there were 734 people, 261 households, and 209 families in the town. The population density was 15.2 people per square mile (5.9/km^{2}). There were 273 housing units at an average density of 5.6 per square mile (2.2/km^{2}). The racial makeup of the town was 99.86% White, and 0.14% from two or more races. One was Hispanic or Latino of any race.

Of the 261 households 36.8% had children under the age of 18 living with them, 69.7% were married couples living together, 5.7% had a female householder with no husband present, and 19.9% were non-families. 16.5% of households were one person and 6.5% were one person aged 65 or older. The average household size was 2.81 and the average family size was 3.14.

The age distribution was 28.7% under the age of 18, 6.0% from 18 to 24, 26.7% from 25 to 44, 25.6% from 45 to 64, and 12.9% 65 or older. The median age was 38 years. For every 100 females, there were 106.2 males. For every 100 females age 18 and over, there were 106.7 males.

The median household income was $34,750 and the median family income was $36,250. Males had a median income of $26,310 versus $18,571 for females. The per capita income for the town was $14,412. About 10.4% of families and 14.5% of the population were below the poverty line, including 23.6% of those under age 18 and 8.3% of those age 65 or over.

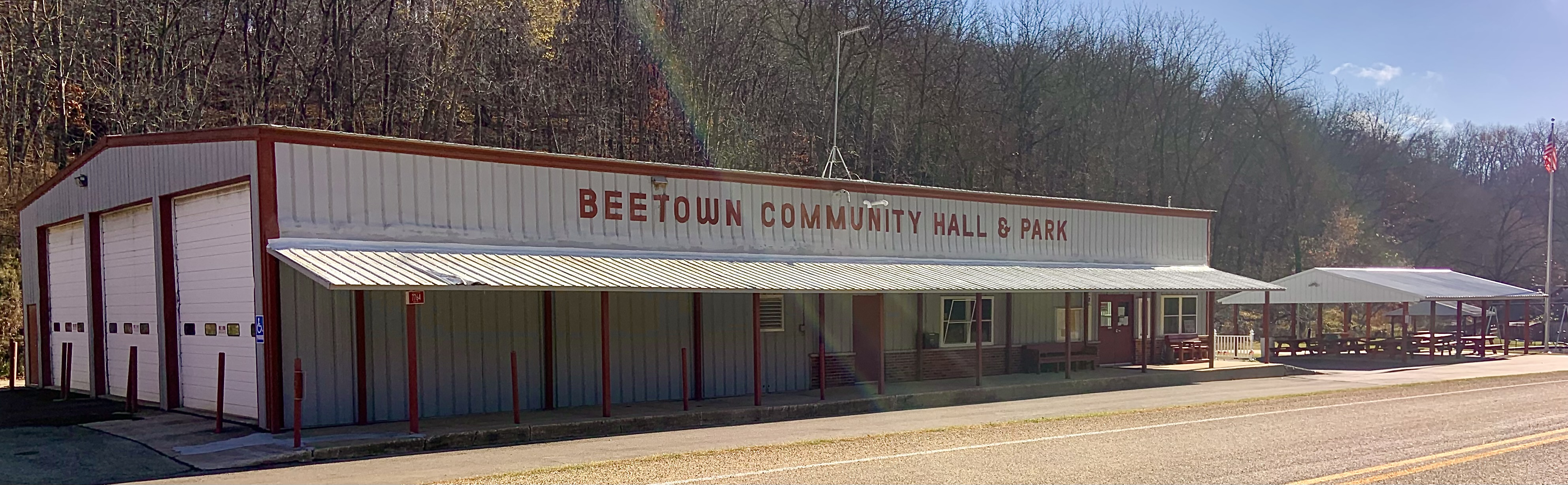
Beetown Town Hall

== Notable people ==
- Lisle Blackbourn, Green Bay Packers coach, was born in Beetown, Wisconsin
- Verne Blackbourn, professional baseball player
- Pierce Cahill, South Dakota legislator, was born in Beetown, Wisconsin
- Oscar Clark Hathaway, Wisconsin legislator, was Chairman of the Town Board of Beetown
- William John McCoy, Wisconsin legislator, was Town Chairman of Beetown
- Reuben B. Showalter, Wisconsin legislator, lived in Beetown
- Daniel Bartlett Stevens, Wisconsin legislator, was Clerk of the town of Beetown
- Willard T. Stevens, Wisconsin legislator, was born in Beetown
