= Pierce Cahill =

American politician

Pierce H. Cahill (January 9, 1869 – January 26, 1935) was a member of the South Dakota Senate from 1901 to 1904.

Cahill was born in Beetown, Wisconsin. He moved with his parents to Green Lake, Wisconsin, where he was educated. In 1889, Cahill moved to South Dakota, where he became a farmer and livestock dealer. He lived in Albee in Grant County, South Dakota. He was a Republican. He died of internal injuries at the hospital in Milbank after a car-train accident at Albee.
