= Pleasant Ridge, Grant County, Wisconsin =

Ghost town in Grant County, Wisconsin

Pleasant Ridge, Wisconsin
- Ghost town
- Location within Wisconsin
- Coordinates: 42°49′52″N 90°48′47″W
- Country: United States
- State: Wisconsin
- County: Grant
- Elevation: 1,014 ft (309 m)

Pleasant Ridge is a former community in the Town of Beetown, Grant County, Wisconsin, United States. Settled c. 1850 by a family of formerly enslaved African Americans from Fauquier County, Virginia, Pleasant Ridge was a rural community with a significant population of formerly enslaved people and their descendants. The community declined in the 20th century, and the last African-American resident died in 1959.

== History ==
In 1848, Charles Shepard and his family were released from slavery when their former enslaver, Sarah Edmonds of Fauquier County, Virginia, died and freed them in her will. Charles; his wife, Caroline; his three children Harriet, John, and Mary; his brother Isaac; and his future sister-in-law, Sarah Brown, traveled to Wisconsin with Edmonds's nephew William Horner, who hoped to make his fortune in southwestern Wisconsin's lead mining industry. When he arrived, he discovered that the state's lead industry was in decline, and he instead purchased between 1,000 and 3,000 acres of farmland in Grant County. The Shepards worked for Horner for several years before acquiring enough money to purchase 200 acres of land from him for $1.50 per acre, laying the groundwork for the Pleasant Ridge community. In the 1850s, African Americans fleeing enslavement in Tennessee, Missouri, and Arkansas settled near the Shepards' land.

Many men from Pleasant Ridge served in the American Civil War, beginning in 1863 when the Union Army allowed African American men to serve as soldiers. Charles Shepard enlisted and died at the Siege of Vicksburg. His son, John, also served in the Union Army, and died of disease toward the end of the war while he was returning to Wisconsin. At least eight African-American veterans of the Civil War returned to Pleasant Ridge after their service and some became farm owners.

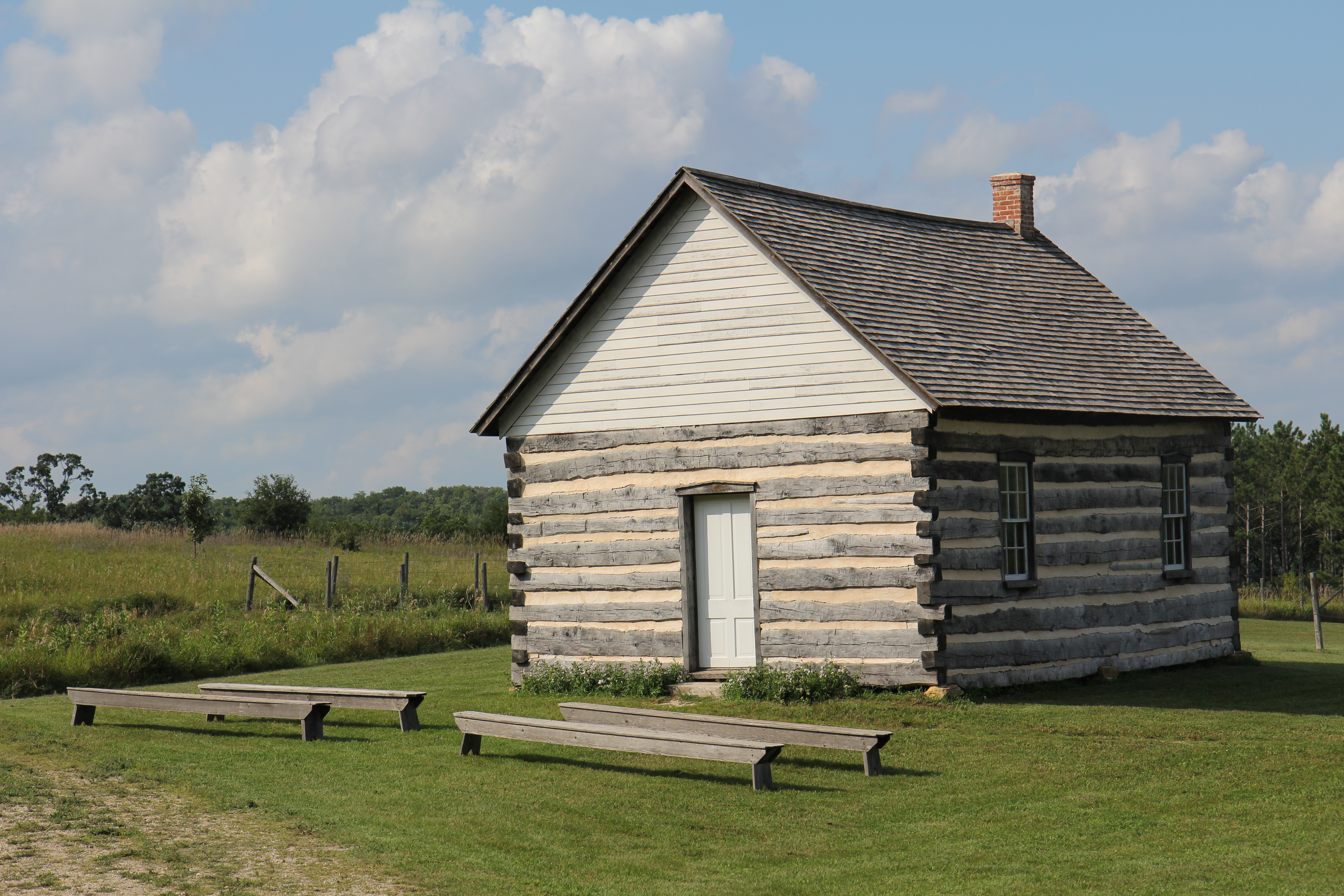
A recreation of the United Brethren Church, which was torn down in 1920, at the Old World Wisconsin open-air museum in Eagle, Wisconsin.

In the years following the Civil War, more African Americans arrived in Pleasant Ridge. Some European American families moved to the area as well. The community's population peaked at between 100 and 200 residents, split fairly evenly between Black and White families. In 1873, the residents built Grant County District School #5, an early integrated public school that employed both Black and White teachers. The community established a cemetery in 1883, the United Brethren Church in 1884, and a community hall in 1898. In 1906 the women of Pleasant Ridge formed the Autumn Leaf Society, a philanthropic group that organized community dances and celebrations, including an annual barbecue each August.

In 1895, Pleasant Ridge's African American residents owned nearly 700 acres of farmland, but in the 20th century the population began to decline. The community's small size and rural setting meant that residents had limited economic opportunities. Many younger residents moved to pursue education and careers in larger cities and other states. Ollie Green Lewis, a descendant of the Shepard family and the last African-American resident, died at Pleasant Ridge in February 1959.

In the 21st century, only the Pleasant Ridge Cemetery remains at the site with a historical marker erected by the Wisconsin chapter of the Daughters of the American Revolution in 1994. The United Brethren Church building was recreated at Old World Wisconsin open-air museum in Eagle, Wisconsin.

== See also ==
- Cheyenne Valley, Wisconsin, another early Black farming settlement
