= Lancaster, Wisconsin =

- City
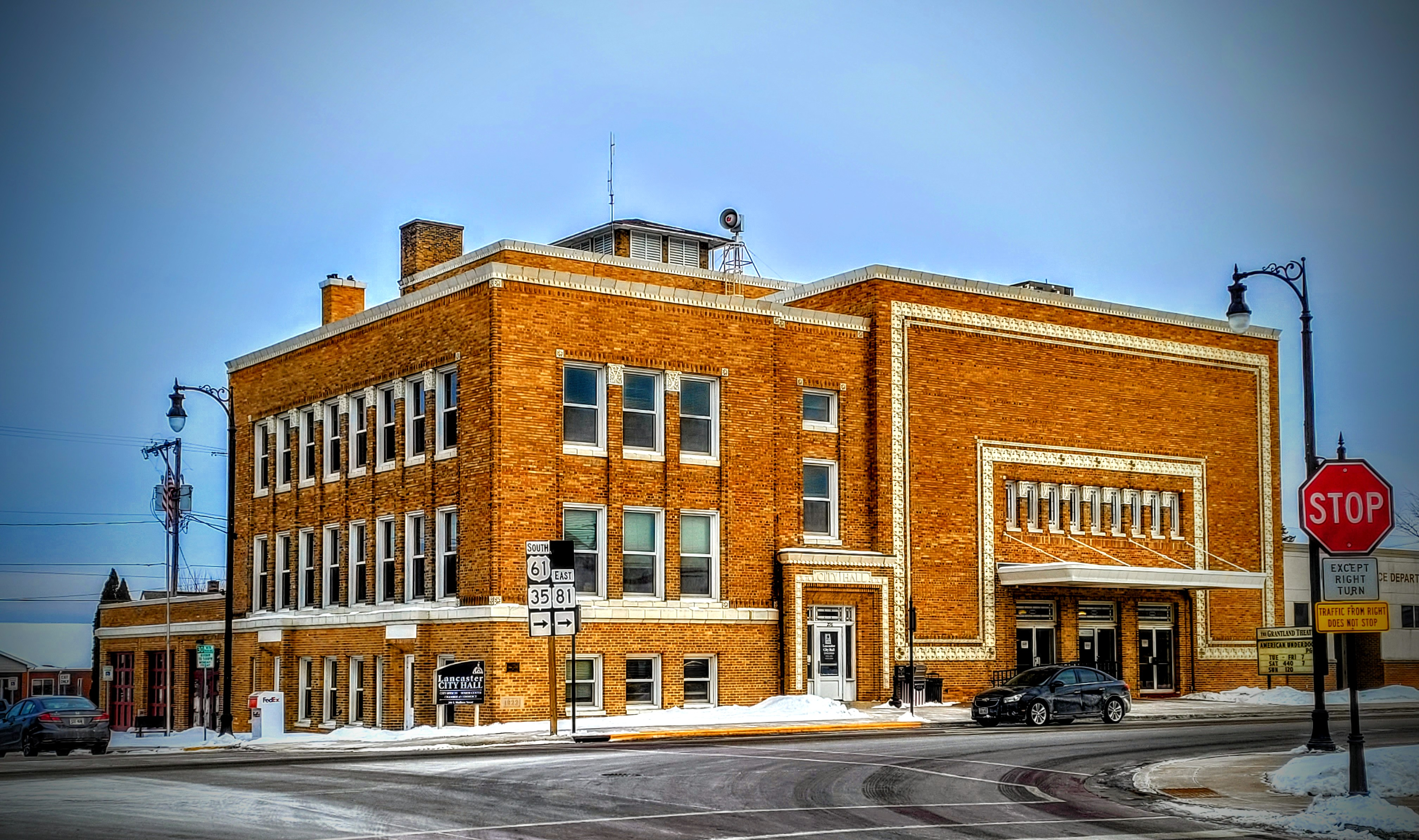
- Lancaster City Hall
- Nickname: City of the Dome
- Location of Lancaster in Grant County, Wisconsin.

- Location within Wisconsin Location within the United States
- Coordinates: 42°50′55″N 90°42′38″W
- Country: United States
- State: Wisconsin
- County: Grant
- Named for: Lancaster, Pennsylvania

Area
  - Total: 3.01 sq mi (7.80 km^{2})
  - Land: 3.01 sq mi (7.80 km^{2})
  - Water: 0 sq mi (0.00 km^{2})
- Elevation: 1,099 ft (335 m)

Population (2020)
  - Total: 3,907
  - Density: 1,298.9/sq mi (501.5/km^{2})
- Time zone: UTC-6 (Central (CST))
  - Summer (DST): UTC-5 (CDT)
- ZIP Code: 53813
- Area code: 608
- FIPS code: 55-42250
- GNIS feature ID: 1567823
- Website: City of Lancaster official website

Lancaster is a city in and the county seat of Grant County, Wisconsin, United States. The population was 3,907 at the 2020 census.

== History ==
Lancaster originated as a planned community to serve as the county seat for Grant County. Anticipating the county's establishment in 1836, Major Glendower M. Price, a Cassville merchant and land speculator, purchased the site of Lancaster for its central location in the county. Major Price platted the town on a compass-aligned grid in 1837, reserving a large central square for the new county government. He was persuaded to name the city Lancaster by a relative who migrated from Lancaster, Pennsylvania. Maj. Price and Daniel Banfill contracted to construct the first county courthouse, which stood on the square from 1838–1851. A second courthouse was constructed in 1852–1853 and enlarged in 1865. The present, third courthouse was constructed on the site in 1902.

Pleasant Ridge, one of the first African-American communities in Wisconsin, was founded just outside Lancaster by the Shepard family in 1849 and settled in the 1850s. Lancaster was the home of the first governor of Wisconsin, Nelson Dewey.

== Geography ==
Lancaster is located at 42°50′55″N 90°42′38″W (42.848505, −90.710430). Lancaster is located in the unglaciated "Driftless Area" of southwestern Wisconsin, whose topography is strikingly different from that of the rest of the state.

According to the United States Census Bureau, the city has a total area of 3.01 square miles (7.80 km^{2}), all land.

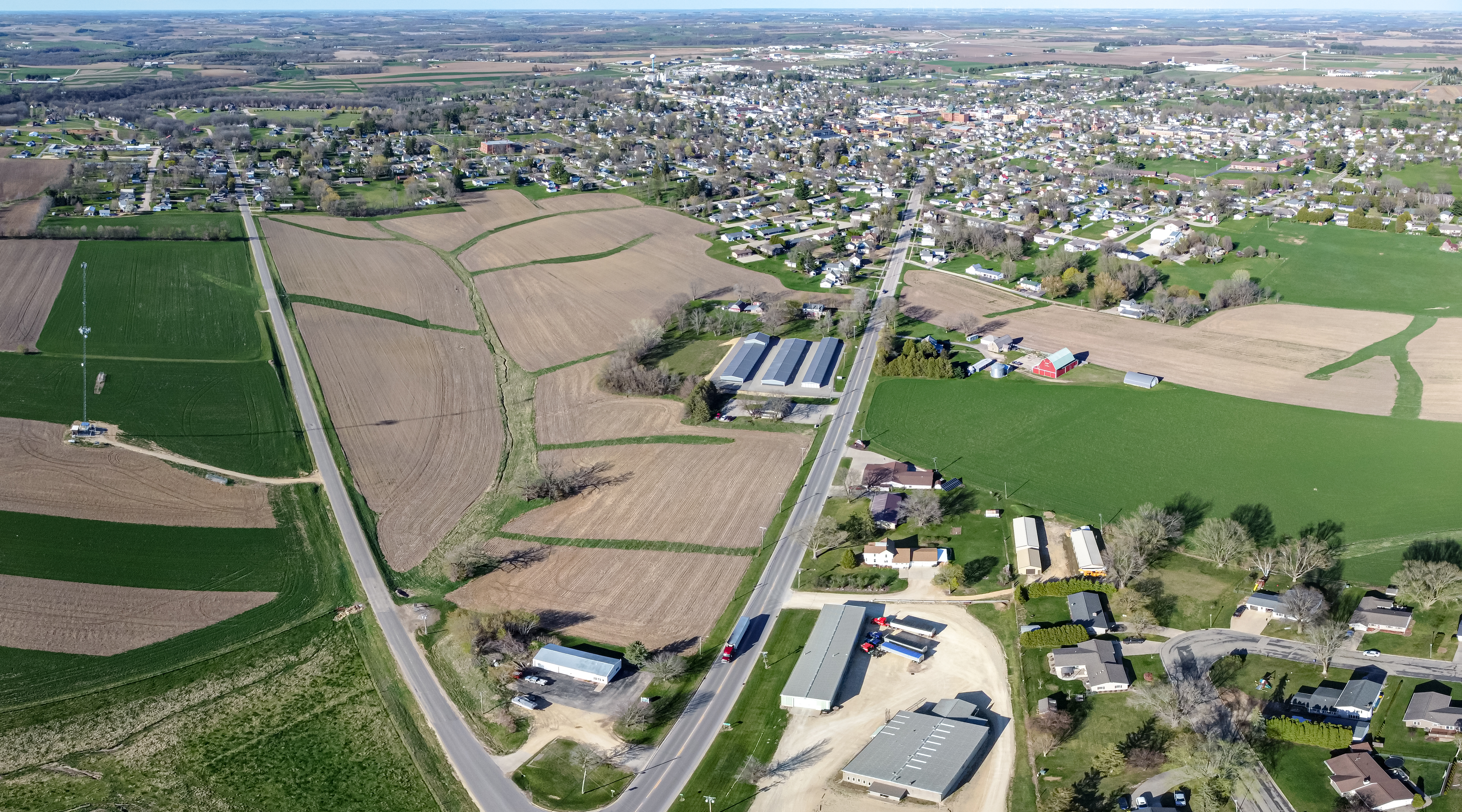

=== Climate ===
Climate data for Lancaster 4 WSW, Wisconsin (1991–2020 normals, extremes 1893–present)
Month	Jan	Feb	Mar	Apr	May	Jun	Jul	Aug	Sep	Oct	Nov	Dec	Year
Record high °F (°C)	60 (16)	71 (22)	84 (29)	95 (35)	104 (40)	100 (38)	108 (42)	103 (39)	100 (38)	94 (34)	77 (25)	68 (20)	108 (42)
Mean daily maximum °F (°C)	25.3 (−3.7)	29.9 (−1.2)	42.9 (6.1)	56.7 (13.7)	68.3 (20.2)	77.4 (25.2)	80.9 (27.2)	79.1 (26.2)	72.2 (22.3)	59.2 (15.1)	43.8 (6.6)	31.0 (−0.6)	55.6 (13.1)
Daily mean °F (°C)	17.1 (−8.3)	21.4 (−5.9)	33.8 (1.0)	46.6 (8.1)	58.1 (14.5)	67.8 (19.9)	71.4 (21.9)	69.5 (20.8)	61.9 (16.6)	49.2 (9.6)	35.6 (2.0)	23.5 (−4.7)	46.3 (7.9)
Mean daily minimum °F (°C)	8.9 (−12.8)	12.9 (−10.6)	24.8 (−4.0)	36.5 (2.5)	47.9 (8.8)	58.2 (14.6)	61.8 (16.6)	59.8 (15.4)	51.6 (10.9)	39.3 (4.1)	27.5 (−2.5)	16.0 (−8.9)	37.1 (2.8)
Record low °F (°C)	−31 (−35)	−31 (−35)	−22 (−30)	6 (−14)	23 (−5)	35 (2)	42 (6)	34 (1)	20 (−7)	3 (−16)	−15 (−26)	−27 (−33)	−31 (−35)
Average precipitation inches (mm)	1.20 (30)	1.29 (33)	1.99 (51)	3.80 (97)	4.39 (112)	5.93 (151)	5.03 (128)	3.86 (98)	4.03 (102)	2.90 (74)	2.37 (60)	1.70 (43)	38.49 (978)
Average snowfall inches (cm)	10.0 (25)	8.9 (23)	4.9 (12)	1.6 (4.1)	0.2 (0.51)	0.0 (0.0)	0.0 (0.0)	0.0 (0.0)	0.0 (0.0)	0.5 (1.3)	2.6 (6.6)	8.7 (22)	37.4 (95)
Average precipitation days (≥ 0.01 in)	8.3	8.0	9.7	11.2	12.9	12.3	10.0	9.8	9.1	9.1	8.2	9.3	117.9
Average snowy days (≥ 0.1 in)	6.1	5.9	3.5	1.2	0.1	0.0	0.0	0.0	0.0	0.3	1.9	5.8	24.8
Source: NOAA

== Demographics ==
Historical population
Census	Pop.	Note	%±
1880	1,069		—
1890	1,543		44.3%
1900	2,403		55.7%
1910	2,329		−3.1%
1920	2,485		6.7%
1930	2,432		−2.1%
1940	2,963		21.8%
1950	3,266		10.2%
1960	3,703		13.4%
1970	3,756		1.4%
1980	4,076		8.5%
1990	4,192		2.8%
2000	4,070		−2.9%
2010	3,868		−5.0%
2020	3,907		1.0%
U.S. Decennial Census

=== 2020 census ===
As of the census of 2020, the population was 3,907. The population density was 1,298.9 inhabitants per square mile (501.5/km^{2}). There were 1,800 housing units at an average density of 598.4 per square mile (231.0/km^{2}). The racial makeup of the city was 95.3% White, 0.8% Black or African American, 0.5% Asian, 0.5% from other races, and 2.8% from two or more races. Ethnically, the population was 1.4% Hispanic or Latino of any race.

=== 2010 census ===
As of the census of 2010, there were 3,868 people, 1,659 households, and 1,037 families living in the city. The population density was 1,272.4 inhabitants per square mile (491.3/km^{2}). There were 1,805 housing units at an average density of 593.8 per square mile (229.3/km^{2}). The racial makeup of the city was 98.3% White, 0.5% African American, 0.2% Native American, 0.5% Asian, 0.3% from other races, and 0.3% from two or more races. Hispanic or Latino of any race were 0.8% of the population.

There were 1,659 households, of which 28.3% had children under the age of 18 living with them, 49.1% were married couples living together, 9.3% had a female householder with no husband present, 4.0% had a male householder with no wife present, and 37.5% were non-families. 32.4% of all households were made up of individuals, and 16.6% had someone living alone who was 65 years of age or older. The average household size was 2.27 and the average family size was 2.87.

The median age in the city was 41.2 years. 23.6% of residents were under the age of 18; 7.4% were between the ages of 18 and 24; 23.1% were from 25 to 44; 26.1% were from 45 to 64; and 19.8% were 65 years of age or older. The gender makeup of the city was 47.4% male and 52.6% female.

=== 2000 census ===
As of the census of 2000, there were 4,070 people, 1,706 households, and 1,079 families living in the city. The population density was 1,441.1 people per square mile (557.2/km^{2}). There were 1,799 housing units at an average density of 637.0 per square mile (246.3/km^{2}). The racial makeup of the city was 99.24% White, 0.07% African American, 0.29% Asian, 0.10% from other races, and 0.29% from two or more races. Hispanic or Latino of any race were 0.42% of the population.

There were 1,706 households, out of which 28.3% had children under the age of 18 living with them, 52.8% were married couples living together, 8.0% had a female householder with no husband present, and 36.7% were non-families. 31.8% of all households were made up of individuals, and 18.1% had someone living alone who was 65 years of age or older. The average household size was 2.31 and the average family size was 2.93.

In the city, the population was spread out, with 23.5% under the age of 18, 9.0% from 18 to 24, 25.1% from 25 to 44, 21.9% from 45 to 64, and 20.5% who were 65 years of age or older. The median age was 40 years. For every 100 females, there were 89.3 males. For every 100 females age 18 and over, there were 87.0 males.

The median income for a household in the city was $32,723, and the median income for a family was $47,500. Males had a median income of $30,683 versus $22,331 for females. The per capita income for the city was $17,797. About 6.4% of families and 8.9% of the population were below the poverty line, including 8.9% of those under age 18 and 9.7% of those age 65 or over.

== Architecture ==
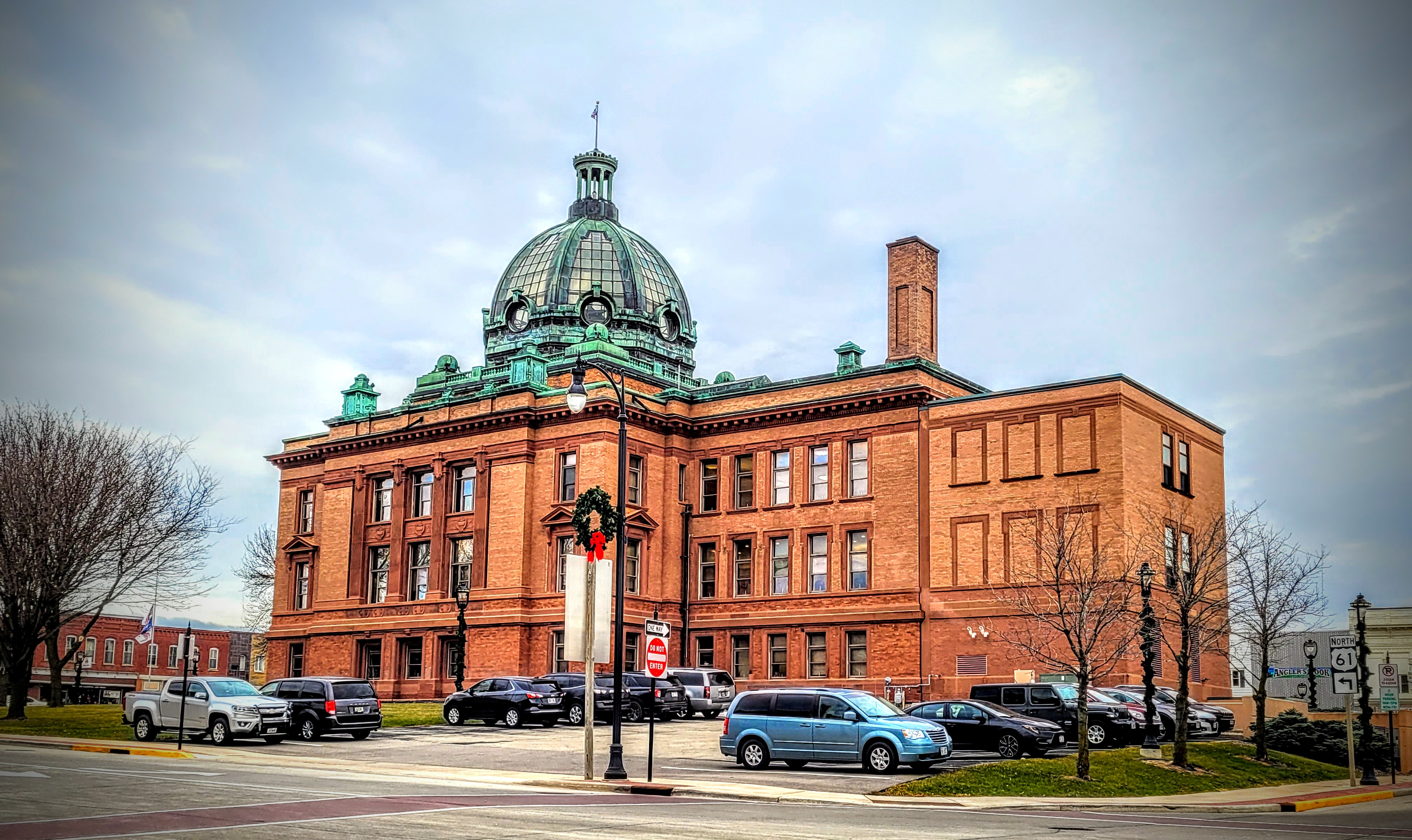
Grant County Courthouse

Lancaster calls itself the "City of the Dome" after the octagonal glass and copper-clad dome of the Grant County Courthouse, which was designed by Armand Koch and built in 1905. In the spandrels of the courthouse dome are four allegorical murals painted by Franz Edward Rohrbeck.

The Municipal Building (1922) is an example of Prairie School early modern architecture, which, like the courthouse, has been placed on the National Register of Historic Places.

The L. J. Arthur House, noted for its architecture, is also listed on the National Register.

The Lancaster Post Office contains a Depression-era mural, painted under the Works Progress Administration program in 1940.

The stone and wood Patrick and Margaret Kinney House in Lancaster was designed by Frank Lloyd Wright, one of 45 Wright structures in Wisconsin.

== Education ==
Lancaster Community School District is the public school district for the community. The town also has a Catholic school.

== Transportation ==
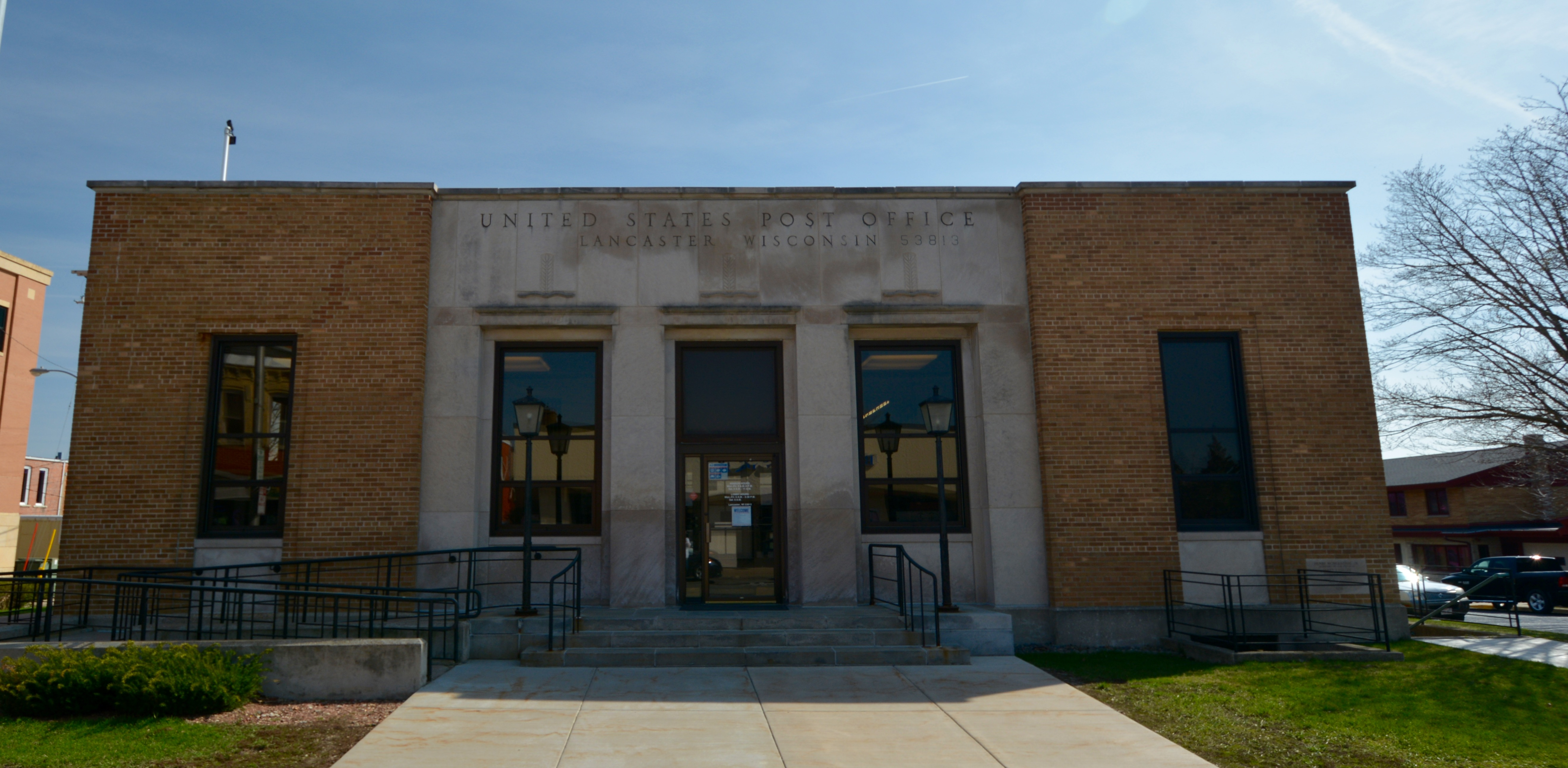
Lancaster Post Office, April 2016

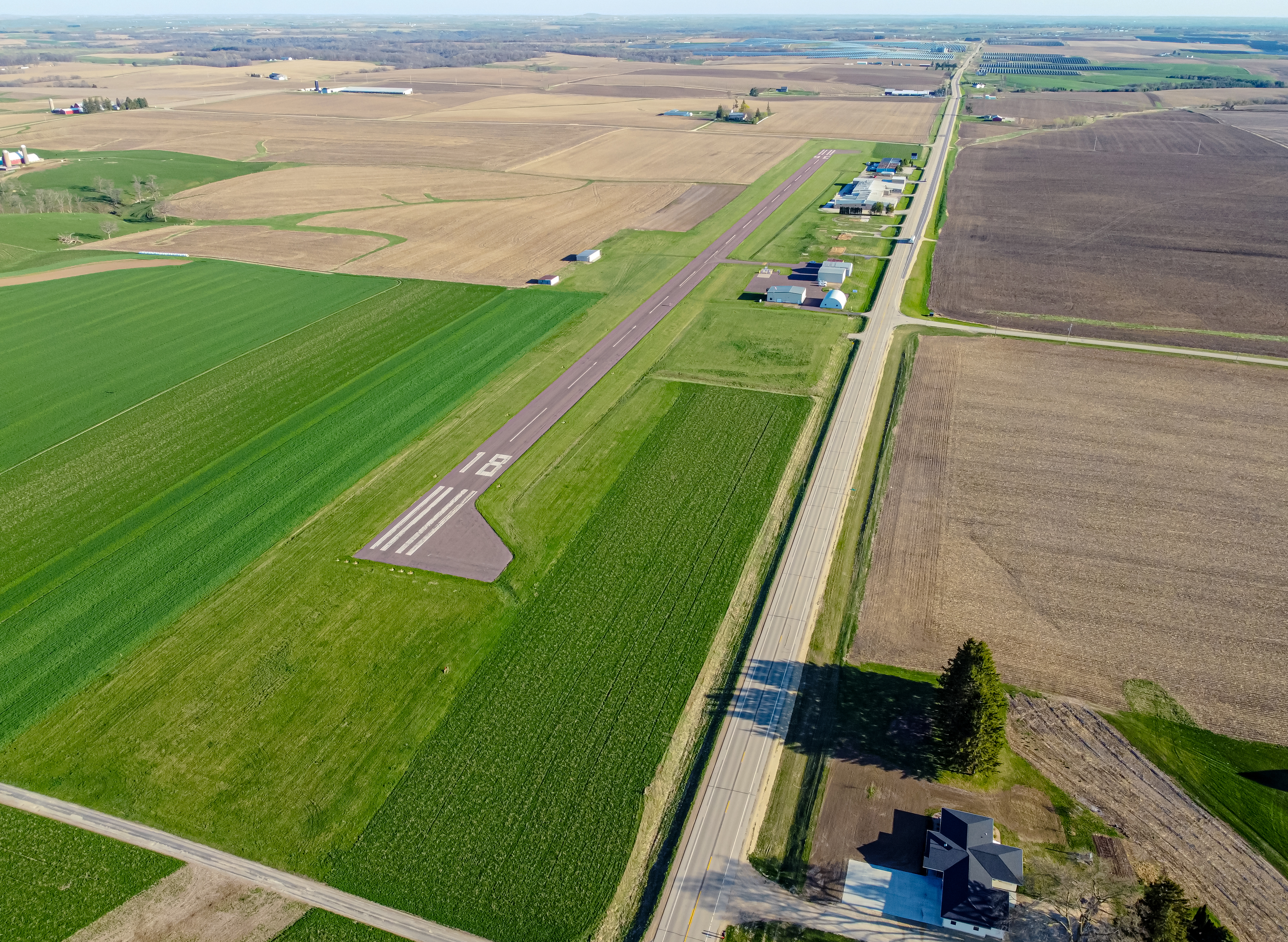
Lancaster Municipal Airport

- U.S. Route 61 (Madison Street) passes north–south through the center of the city.
- Highway 35 enters east on South Harrison Street and Cherry Street, then follows US 61 (Madison Street)
- Highway 29 bypasses the city to the east
- County Trunk Highway A, passes east–west through the center of the city

Lancaster Municipal Airport (73C) serves the city and surrounding communities.

Until 1980, the village was served by a Chicago and North Western branch line from Madison The village was the end of the branch line.

== Notable people ==
- J. Allen Barber – lawyer, U.S. Representative 1871–1875; lived and died in Lancaster
- George Barnett – Commandant of the United States Marine Corps
- Charles H. Baxter – Wisconsin State Senator
- Lisle Blackbourn – NFL head coach
- John Benton Callis – U.S. Representative from Alabama
- William Carter – Wisconsin State Representative
- John G. Clark (1825–1917) – Associate Justice of Oklahoma Territory Supreme Court (1898–1903), returned to Lancaster for the rest of his life
- Nelson Dewey – first Governor of Wisconsin; lived in Lancaster
- Hugh A. Harper – Wisconsin State Representative
- John Chandler Holloway – President Pro Tem of the Wisconsin State Senate
- A. H. Kemper – South Dakota politician
- William John McCoy – Wisconsin State Representative
- Thomas McDonald, Jr. – Wisconsin State Representative
- Joseph Trotter Mills – Wisconsin State Representative
- Roger P. Murphy – Wisconsin State Senator and jurist
- Carson Abel Roberts – U.S. Marine Corps Lieutenant General
- Dave Schreiner – member of the College Football Hall of Fame
- David Schreiner – Wisconsin State Representative
- Reuben B. Showalter – Wisconsin State Representative
- William Simon U'Ren – Oregon politician
- Arthur W. Worth – Wisconsin State Representative

== See also ==
- List of cities in Wisconsin
