= List of mayors of La Crosse, Wisconsin =

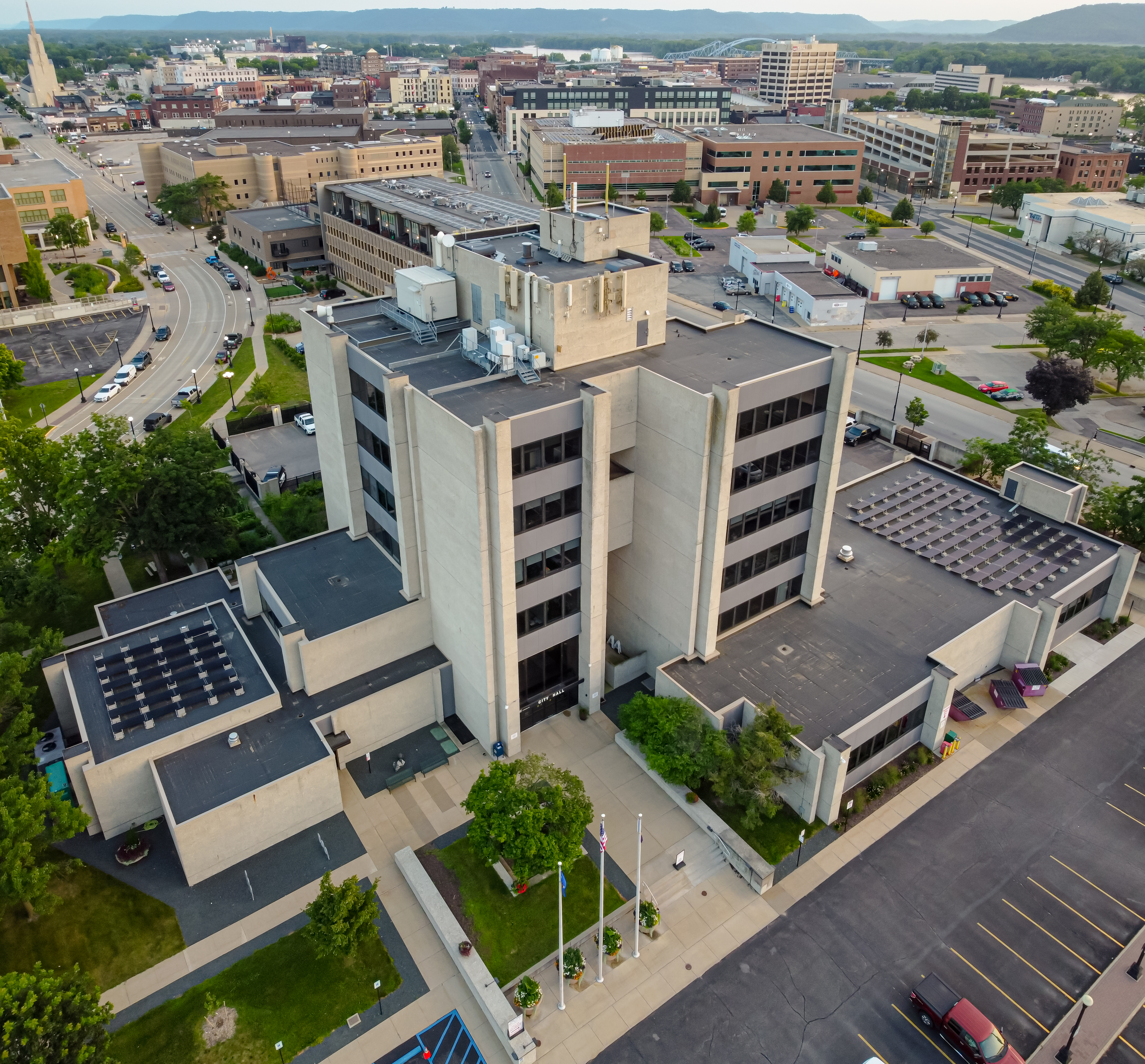
La Crosse City Hall

This is a list of mayors of La Crosse, Wisconsin, United States. La Crosse was originally incorporated as a village in 1851. In the 9th Wisconsin Legislature (1856), La Crosse was re-incorporated as a city. La Crosse has always since then utilized a mayor-council form of government. Mayors were initially elected every year. Mayoral terms were increased to two years in 1885, and extended to four years in 1981.

The first mayor of La Crosse was Thomas Benton Stoddard, a pioneer lawyer and railroad developer. The current mayor is Shaundel Washington-Spivey, a former member of the La Crosse School Board. Washington-Spivey is also La Crosse's first black mayor and first LGBTQ mayor. Patrick Zielke was the longest-serving mayor, holding office from 1975 to 1997.

== Mayors with 1-year term (1856–1885) ==
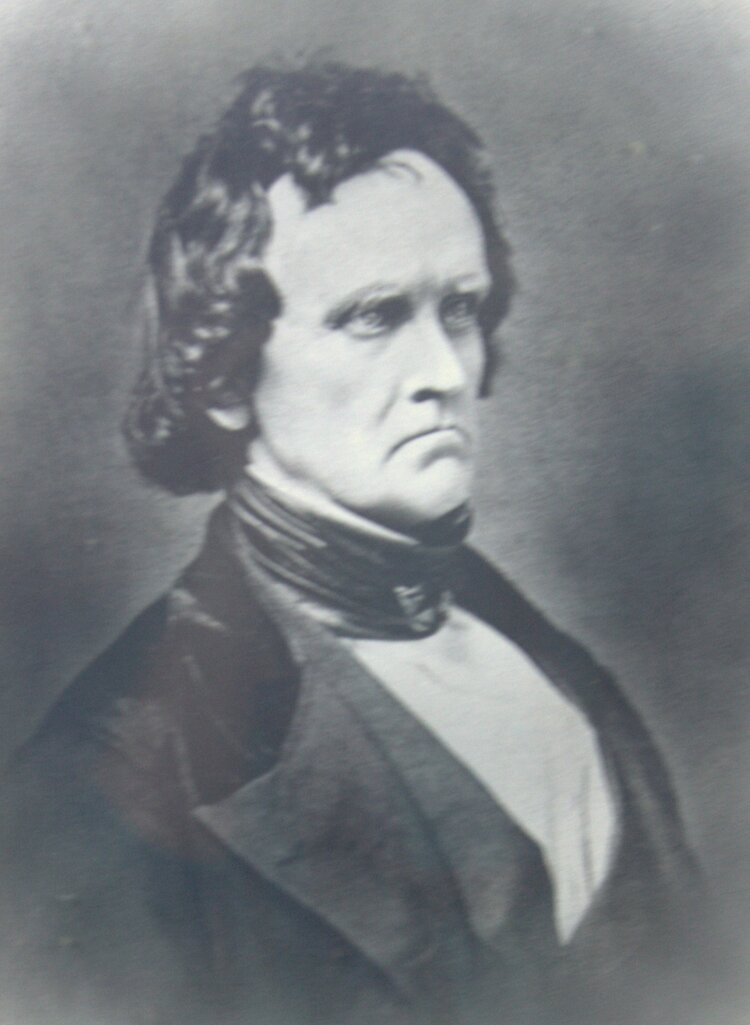
Thomas Benton Stoddard, first mayor of La Crosse

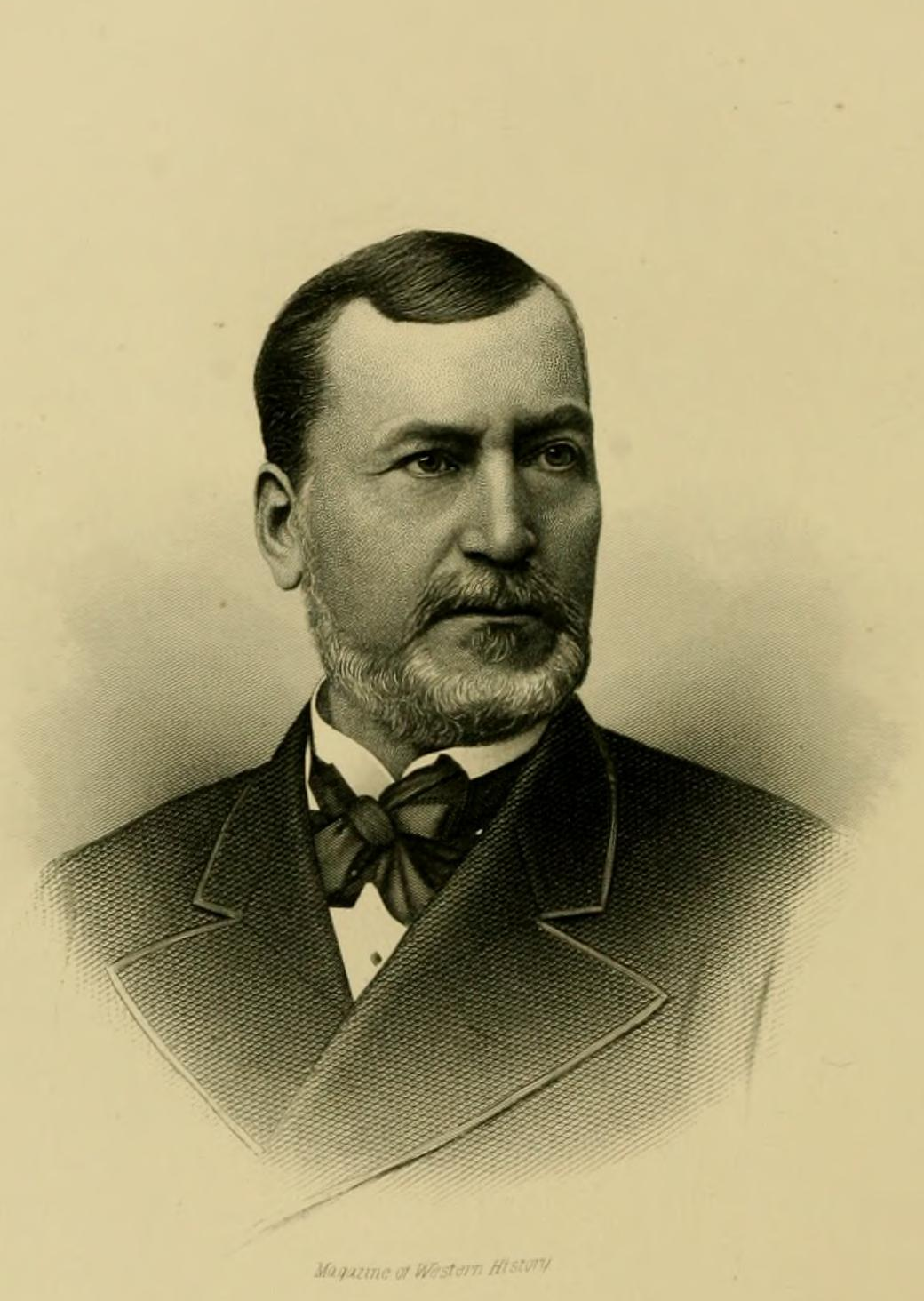
Gysbert Van Steenwyk Sr., 15th mayor

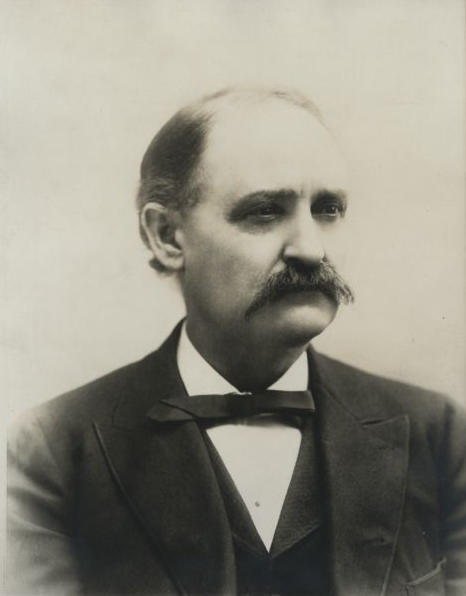
Gilbert M. Woodward, 16th mayor

Order	Mayor	Term start	Term end	Notes
1	Thomas Benton Stoddard	1856	1857	
2	Erasmus D. Campbell	1857	1858	
3	David Taylor	1858	1859	
4	James I. Lyndes	1859	1860	
5	John M. Levy	1860	1861	
6	Wilson Colwell	1861	1862	
7	Albert W. Pettibone	1862	1865	
8	William J. Lloyd	1865	1866	
9	John M. Levy	1866	1868	
10	Theodore Rodolf	1868	1869	
11	Charles. L. Colman	1869	1870	
12	Theodore Rodolf	1870	1871	
13	Alexander McMillan	1871	1872	
14	James I. Lyndes	1872	1873	
15	Gysbert Van Steenwyk Sr.	1873	1874	
16	Gilbert M. Woodward	1874	1875	
17	James J. Hogan	1875	1877	
18	George Edwards	1877	1878	
19	David Law	1878	1880	
20	Joseph Clark	1880	1881	
21	Hiram F. Smiley	1881	1882	
22	David Law	1882	1884	
23	William A. Roosevelt	1884	1885	

== Mayors with 2-year term (1885–1981) ==
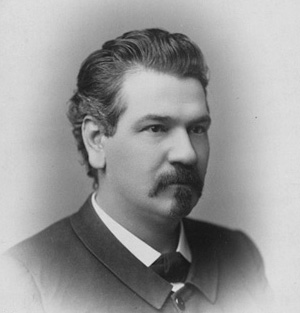
David Franklin Powell, 24th & 28th mayor

Order	Mayor	Term start	Term end	Notes
24	David Franklin Powell	1885	1887	
25	David Austin	1887	1889	
26	John Dengler	1889	1891	
27	Frederick A. Copeland	1891	1893	
28	David Franklin Powell	1893	1897	
29	James McCord	1897	1899	
30	Wendell Abraham Anderson	1899	1901	
31	Joseph Boschert	1901	1903	
32	William Torrance	1903	1907	
33	Wendell Abraham Anderson	1907	1909	
34	Ori J. Sorenson	1909	1911	
35	John Denger	1911	1913	
36	Ori J. Sorenson	1913	1915	
37	Arthur A. Bentley	1915	1923	
38	Joseph J. Verchota	1923	1929	
39	John E. Langdon	1929	1931	
40	Joseph J. Verchota	1931	1935	
41	Carl August Boerner	1935	1939	
42	Joseph J. Verchota	1939	1947	
43	Charles A. Beranek	1947	1949	
44	Henry J. Ahrens	1949	1955	
45	Milo Knutson	1955	1965	
46	Warren Loveland	1965	1971	Elected 1965, 1967, 1969. Lost 1971 election.
47	W. Peter Gilbertson	1971	1975	Elected 1971, 1973. Lost 1975 election.
48	Patrick Zielke	1975	1981	Elected 1975, 1977, 1979.

== Mayors with 4-year term (1981–present) ==
At the November 1980 general election, La Crosse voters agreed to a referendum to increase the mayoral term from two years to four years.

Order	Mayor	Term start	Term end	Notes
48	Patrick Zielke	1981	1997	Elected 1981, 1985, 1989, 1993. Retired. First mayor to win seven terms. Longest-serving mayor.
49	John Medinger	1997	2005	Elected 1997, 2001. Retired.
50	Mark Johnsrud	2005	2009	Elected 2005. Lost 2009 primary.
51	Mathias Harter	2009	2013	Elected 2009. Youngest mayor (24 when elected).
52	Tim Kabat	2013	2021	Elected 2013, 2017. Retired.
53	Mitch Reynolds	2021	2025	Elected 2021. Retired.
54	Shaundel Washington-Spivey	2025	present	Elected 2025. First black mayor. First LGBTQ mayor.

== See also ==
- La Crosse, Wisconsin
- La Crosse County, Wisconsin
- Political subdivisions of Wisconsin
