= 1865 Wisconsin gubernatorial election =

- November 7, 1865
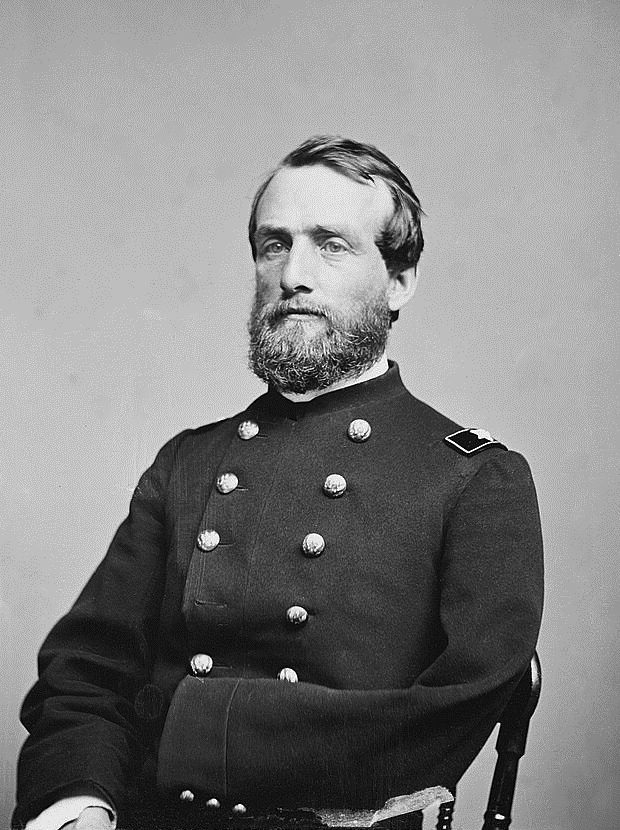

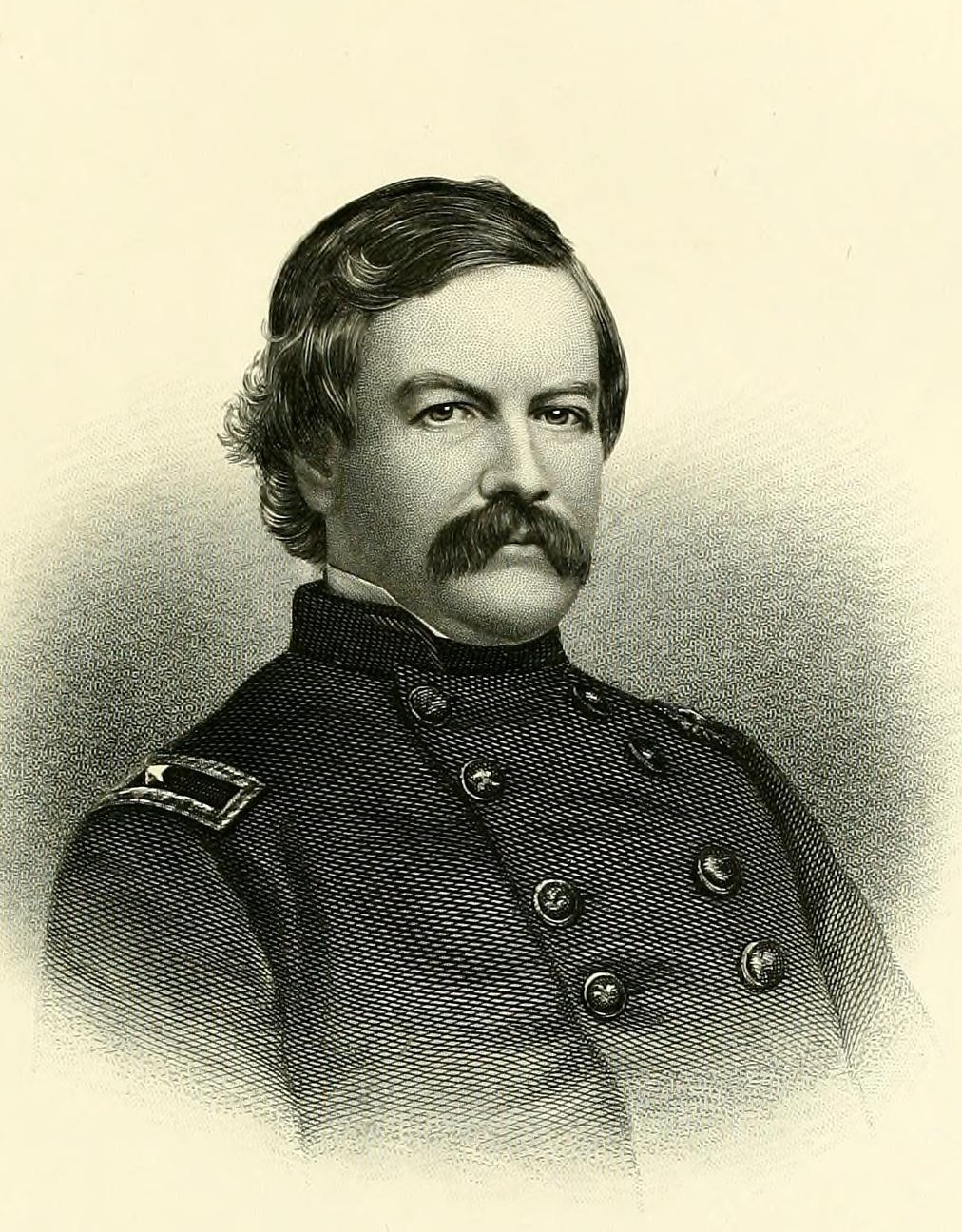
Nominee	Lucius Fairchild	Harrison Carroll Hobart
Party	National Union	Democratic
Popular vote	58,332	48,330
Percentage	54.69%	45.31%
- County results Fairchild : 50–60% 60–70% 70–80% 80–90% >90% Hobart : 50–60% 60–70% 70–80% 80–90%
Governor before election
James T. Lewis
National Union
Elected Governor
Lucius Fairchild
National Union

The 1865 Wisconsin gubernatorial election was held on November 7, 1865. Union candidate Lucius Fairchild won the election with nearly 55% of the vote, defeating Democratic candidate Harrison Carroll Hobart.

The incumbent Governor, James T. Lewis, refused nomination for re-election.

The American Civil War had concluded just a few months before this election was held; both major party candidates in this election were retired brigadier generals who had served with distinction in the war.

== Nominations ==
=== Union party ===
Lucius Fairchild was the incumbent Wisconsin Secretary of State at the time of the 1865 election, having been elected in the 1863 election on the Union Party ticket. Fairchild was one of the first Wisconsin men to volunteer for service in the Union Army, rising from captain to colonel with the 2nd Wisconsin Infantry Regiment in the famous Iron Brigade in the eastern theater of the war. He led the regiment in fierce fighting during the first day of the Battle of Gettysburg. At Gettysburg, Fairchild was wounded and captured. He was quickly released from captivity, but his left arm had been crushed and had to be amputated. He returned to Madison to recuperate, and was then nominated for Wisconsin Secretary of State. President Lincoln awarded him an honorary promotion to brigadier general.

=== Democratic party ===
Harrison Carroll Hobart had served as a Union Army officer through the entire war, rising from captain to brigadier general, operating as colonel of the 21st Wisconsin Infantry Regiment and brigadier in XIV Corps in the western theater of the war. He was captured and escaped captivity during the war. Prior to the war, Hobart had served in the Wisconsin State Assembly, and had served as Speaker of the Assembly in the 1849 session. He had also served as in the Wisconsin State Senate during the 1st Wisconsin Legislature. This was Hobart's second attempt at election for Governor of Wisconsin, having been defeated by Alexander Randall in the 1859 election.

== Results ==
1865 Wisconsin gubernatorial election
Party	Candidate	Votes	%	±%
National Union	Lucius Fairchild	58,332	54.68%	−4.91%
Democratic	Harrison Carroll Hobart	48,330	45.31%	+5.11%
	Scattering	12	0.01%	
Majority		10,002	9.38%	
Total votes		106,674	100.00%	
National Union hold		Swing	-10.02%	

=== Results by county ===
County	Lucius Fairchild National Union		Harrison C. Hobart Democratic		Margin		Total votes cast
County	#	%	#	%	#	%	Total votes cast
Adams	594	82.50%	126	17.50%	468	65.00%	720
Ashland	29	55.77%	23	44.23%	6	11.54%	52
Brown	447	34.57%	846	65.43%	-399	-30.86%	1,293
Buffalo	523	71.25%	211	28.75%	312	42.51%	734
Burnett	27	100.00%	0	0.00%	27	100.00%	27
Calumet	485	45.63%	578	54.37%	-93	-8.75%	1,063
Chippewa	200	47.28%	223	52.72%	-23	-5.44%	423
Clark	109	73.65%	39	26.35%	70	47.30%	148
Columbia	2,021	65.03%	1,087	34.97%	934	30.05%	3,108
Crawford	517	47.09%	581	52.91%	-64	-5.83%	1,098
Dane	3,535	57.05%	2,660	42.93%	875	14.12%	6,196 (Note: Includes 1 Scattering vote)
Dodge	2,702	43.01%	3,580	56.99%	-878	-13.98%	6,282
Door	309	81.96%	68	18.04%	241	63.93%	377
Douglas	45	45.45%	54	54.55%	-9	-9.09%	99
Dunn	417	61.87%	257	38.13%	160	23.74%	674
Eau Claire	422	57.41%	312	42.45%	110	14.97%	735
Fond du Lac	2,871	50.97%	2,759	48.98%	112	1.99%	5,633 (Note: Includes 3 Scattering votes)
Grant	2,577	69.50%	1,131	30.50%	1,446	39.00%	3,708
Green	1,552	68.07%	728	31.93%	824	36.14%	2,280
Green Lake	1,027	70.88%	422	29.12%	605	41.75%	1,449
Iowa	1,102	51.09%	1,051	48.73%	51	2.36%	2,157 (Note: Includes 4 Scattering votes)
Jackson	506	72.29%	194	27.71%	312	44.57%	700
Jefferson	2,003	46.17%	2,335	53.83%	-332	-7.65%	4,338
Juneau	627	52.96%	556	46.96%	71	6.00%	1,184
Kenosha	1,035	65.22%	552	34.78%	483	30.43%	1,587
Kewaunee	122	24.16%	383	75.84%	-261	-51.68%	505
La Crosse	1,127	60.82%	725	39.13%	402	21.69%	1,853
La Pointe	29	64.44%	16	35.56%	13	28.89%	45
Lafayette	1,213	46.96%	1,370	53.04%	-157	-6.08%	2,583
Manitowoc	1,013	36.11%	1,792	63.89%	-779	-27.77%	2,805
Marathon	112	18.33%	499	81.67%	-387	-63.34%	611
Marquette	446	43.47%	580	56.53%	-134	-13.06%	1,026
Milwaukee	2,271	31.07%	5,038	68.92%	-2,767	-37.85%	7,310
Monroe	1,006	63.39%	581	36.61%	425	26.78%	1,587
Oconto	352	59.36%	241	40.64%	111	18.72%	593
Outagamie	739	42.33%	1,007	57.67%	-268	-15.35%	1,746
Ozaukee	263	13.80%	1,643	86.20%	-1,380	-72.40%	1,906
Pepin	231	75.24%	76	24.76%	155	50.49%	307
Pierce	540	69.41%	238	30.59%	302	38.82%	778
Polk	197	63.75%	112	36.25%	85	27.51%	309
Portage	597	61.80%	369	38.20%	228	23.60%	966
Racine	1,499	56.54%	1,152	43.46%	347	13.09%	2,651
Richland	967	60.32%	636	39.68%	331	20.65%	1,603
Rock	3,190	73.98%	1,122	26.02%	2,068	47.96%	4,312
Sauk	1,681	69.15%	750	30.85%	931	38.30%	2,431
Shawano	138	54.33%	116	45.67%	22	8.66%	254
Sheboygan	1,605	49.02%	1,669	50.98%	-64	-1.95%	3,274
St. Croix	543	69.26%	241	30.74%	302	38.52%	784
Trempealeau	415	89.83%	47	10.17%	368	79.65%	462
Vernon	1,164	90.65%	120	9.35%	1,044	81.31%	1,284
Walworth	2,890	77.23%	852	22.77%	2,038	54.46%	3,742
Washington	599	23.33%	1,969	76.67%	-1,370	-53.35%	2,568
Waukesha	1,939	48.92%	2,025	51.08%	-86	-2.17%	3,964
Waupaca	1,109	69.27%	492	30.73%	617	38.54%	1,601
Waushara	1,050	80.09%	261	19.91%	789	60.18%	1,311
Winnebago	2,180	62.66%	1,299	37.34%	881	25.32%	3,749
Wood	223	46.27%	259	53.73%	-36	-7.47%	482
Soldiers	1,200	81.25%	277	18.75%	923	62.49%	1,477
Total	58,332	54.68%	48,330	45.31%	10,002	9.38%	106,674

==== Counties that flipped from National Union to Democratic ====
- Crawford
- Lafayette
- Sheboygan
- Waukesha
