= Erasmus D. Campbell =

American politician (1811–1873)

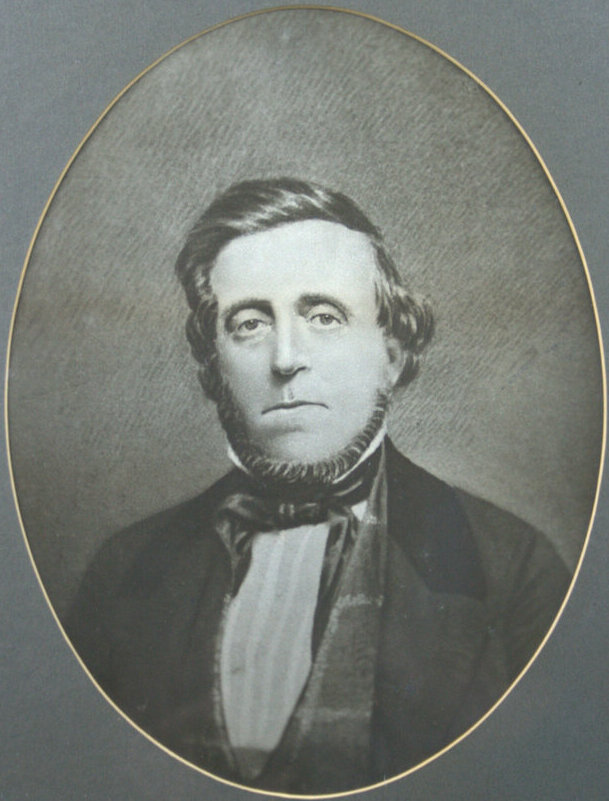

6th Lieutenant Governor of Wisconsin
- In office January 4, 1858 – January 2, 1860
- Governor: Alexander W. Randall
- Preceded by: Arthur MacArthur Sr.
- Succeeded by: Butler Noble

2nd Mayor of La Crosse, Wisconsin
- In office April 1857 – April 1858
- Preceded by: Thomas Benton Stoddard
- Succeeded by: David Taylor

Personal details
- Born: Erasmus Daniel Campbell; January 11, 1811 South Kingstown, Rhode Island, U.S.
- Died: April 16, 1873 (aged 62) La Crosse, Wisconsin, U.S.
- Resting place: La Crosse County, Wisconsin
- Party: Democratic
- Spouse: Hannah Rodman (m. 1815–1873)
- Children: Rowena Hazard (Crary)^{(b. 1834; died 1907)}; James Hazard Campbell^{(b. 1835; died 1861)}; Samuel Rodman Campbell^{(b. 1837; died 1899)}; Olive W. Campbell^{(b. 1839; died 1844)}; Colin Campbell^{(b. 1841; died 1888)}; Abby Jane Campbell^{(b. 1843; died 1918)}; Ella D. Campbell^{(b. 1852; died 1857)}; Annie E. Campbell^{(b. 1858; died 1859)}; Zaidee (Martin)^{(b. 1860; died 1928)}
- Profession: lawyer, politician

Military service
- Allegiance: United States
- Branch/service: Rhode Island Militia
- Years of service: 1830s & 1840s
- Rank: Lieutenant
- Unit: "Washington Grenadiers"
- Battles/wars: Dorr Rebellion

Erasmus Daniel Campbell (January 11, 1811 – April 16, 1873) was an American Democratic politician who served as the 6th lieutenant governor of Wisconsin (1858–1860), and 2nd mayor of La Crosse, Wisconsin (1857–1858). In historical sources, he was sometimes referred to as "E. D. Campbell." In at least one source, he was incorrectly referred to as "Edward Campbell."

He is the namesake of Campbell, Wisconsin.

== Biography ==
Erasmus D. Campbell was born in South Kingstown, Rhode Island, and lived for a time in Connecticut. As a young man, he was active in the Rhode Island militia, and participated in the Dorr Rebellion in the early 1840s. He arrived in La Crosse, Wisconsin, in 1854. He initially worked as a cashier in a bank owned by J. M. Levy. He studied law and eventually entered a law partnership, Campbell & Wood.

In 1857, Campbell was elected Mayor of La Crosse. As mayor, Campbell advocated for the building a work-house, the purchase and establishment of a poor farm, the construction of a city hall, a new jail, additional school houses, and other infrastructure improvements. Shortly after he took office, the City Council passed a bond measure to pay for an expanded city jail. The city selected and purchased a lot of farmland for a poor farm near Shelby. His year as mayor was ultimately marred by the Panic of 1857, in which Campbell lost a significant portion of his personal wealth and property.

Later that year, at the 1857 Wisconsin Democratic Party Convention, Mayor Campbell was nominated as the Democratic Party's candidate for Lieutenant Governor in the 1857 election. Among convention delegates, Campbell received 83 votes to 51 for Henry M. Billings. Campbell ran alongside Democratic gubernatorial candidate, Milwaukee Mayor James B. Cross.

Campbell defeated his opponent in the general election, Milwaukee abolitionist lawyer Carl Schurz, but his running-mate, Mayor Cross, was defeated by Republican Alexander Randall.

In his later years, Campbell retired to a farm near Shelby. He died in La Crosse, April 16, 1873.

== Personal life and legacy ==
Erasmus Campbell married Hannah Rodman in 1815, at South Kingstown. They had nine children together, with six surviving to adulthood.

The town of Campbell in La Crosse County, was named after him.

Political offices
Preceded by Thomas Benton Stoddard	Mayor of La Crosse, Wisconsin; April 1857 – April 1858	Succeeded by David Taylor
Preceded by Arthur MacArthur, Sr.	Lieutenant Governor of Wisconsin; 1858–1860	Succeeded by Butler Noble
