= 1886 Wisconsin gubernatorial election =

- November 2, 1886
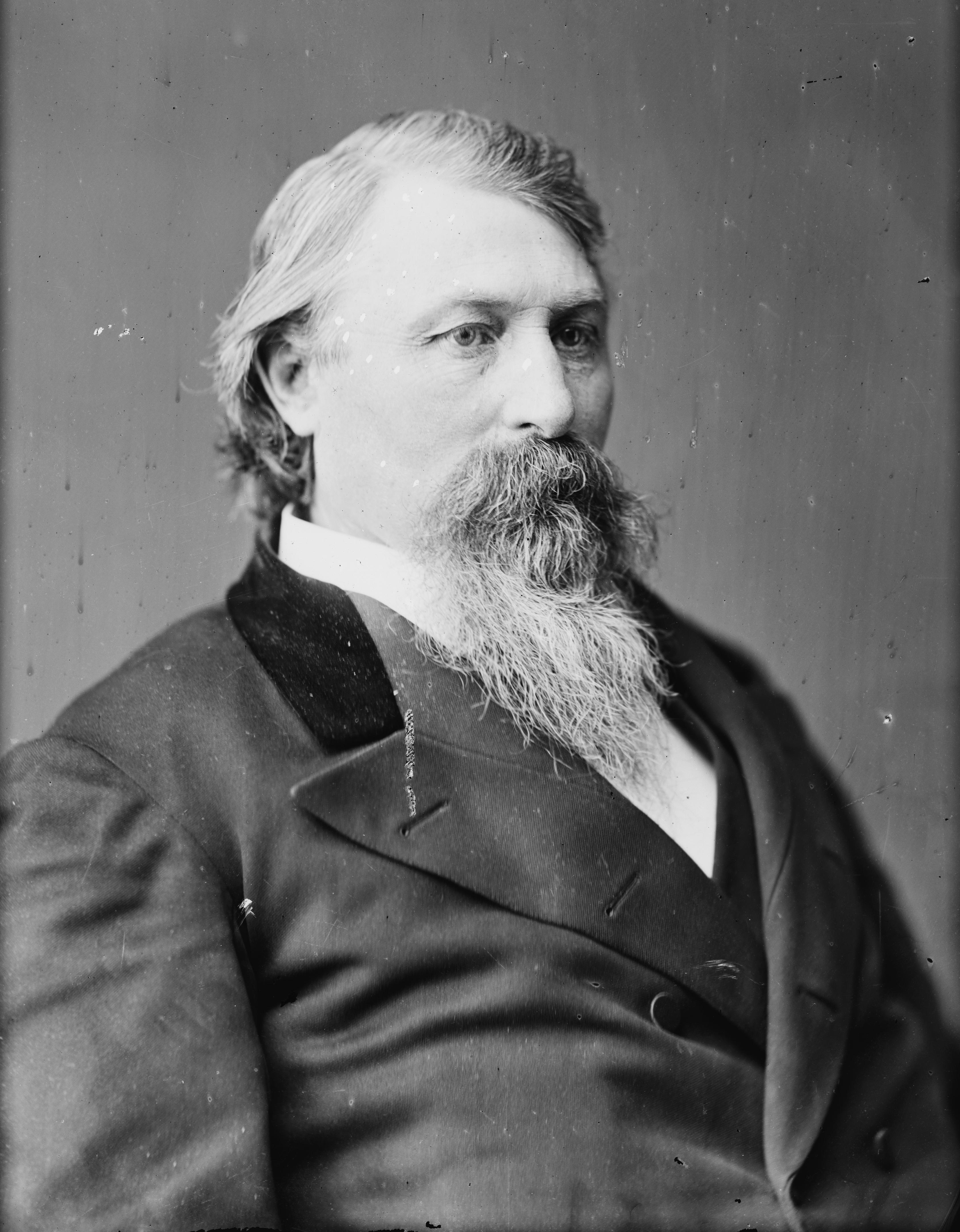

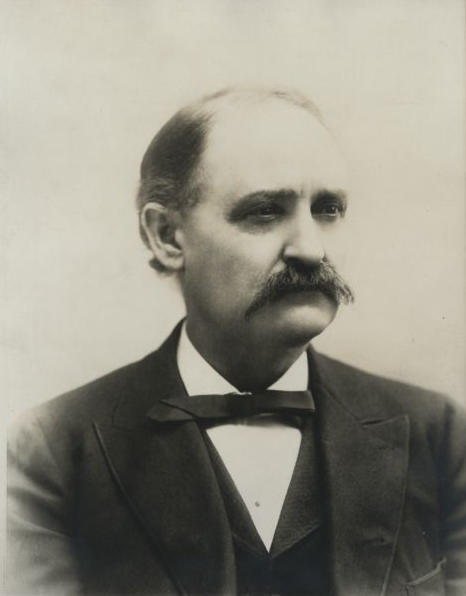

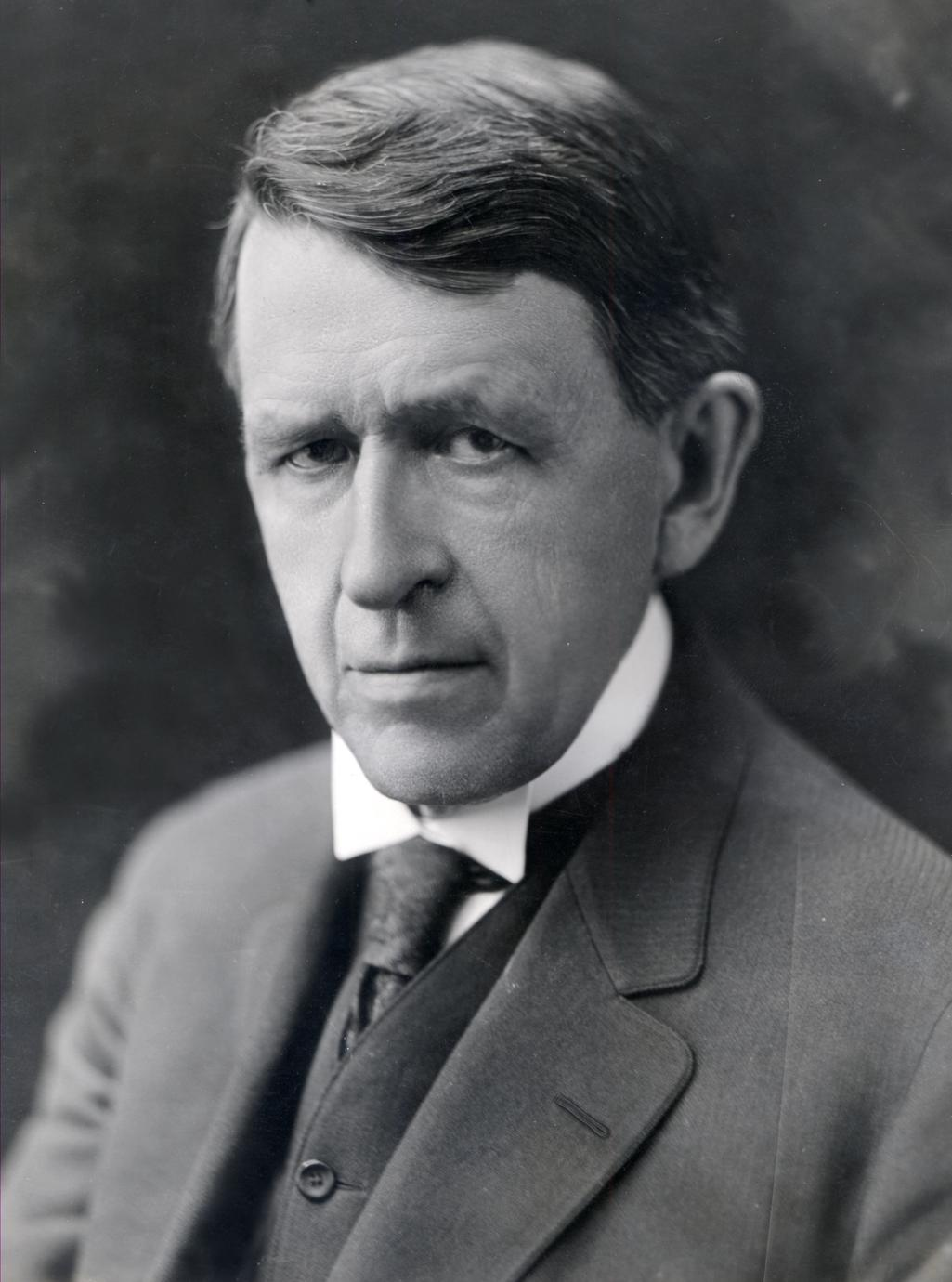
Nominee	Jeremiah McLain Rusk	Gilbert M. Woodward
Party	Republican	Democratic
Popular vote	133,247	114,529
Percentage	46.53%	39.99%
Nominee	John Cochrane	John Myers Olin
Party	People's	Prohibition
Popular vote	21,467	17,089
Percentage	7.50%	5.97%
- County results Rusk : 30–40% 40–50% 50–60% 60–70% 70–80% 80–90% >90% Woodward : 40–50% 50–60% 60–70% 70–80% Cochrane : 40–50% No Vote
Governor before election
Jeremiah McLain Rusk
Republican
Elected Governor
Jeremiah McLain Rusk
Republican

The 1886 Wisconsin gubernatorial election was held on November 2, 1886.

Republican nominee Jeremiah McLain Rusk defeated Democratic nominee Gilbert M. Woodward,People's nominee John Cochrane, and Prohibition nominee John Myers Olin with 46.53% of the vote.

== General election ==
=== Candidates ===
Major party candidates

- Gilbert M. Woodward, Democratic, attorney, former member of the United States House of Representatives
- Jeremiah McLain Rusk, Republican, incumbent Governor

Other candidates

- John Myers Olin, Prohibition, lecturer in law at the University of Wisconsin, Prohibition nominee for Wisconsin's 3rd congressional district in 1884
- John Cochrane, People's

=== Results ===
1886 Wisconsin gubernatorial election
Party	Candidate	Votes	%	±%
Republican	Jeremiah M. Rusk (incumbent)	133,247	46.53%	−4.47%
Democratic	Gilbert M. Woodward	114,529	39.99%	−4.99%
Union Labor	John Cochrane	21,467	7.50%	+6.16%
Prohibition	John M. Olin	17,089	5.97%	+3.30%
	Scattering	34	0.01%	
	Blank	2	0.00%	
Majority		18,718	6.54%	
Total votes		286,368	100.00%	
Republican hold		Swing	+0.51%	

=== Results by county ===
Marquette County voted Republican for the first time since 1857. Woodward was the first Democrat since 1859 to win Bayfield County and La Crosse County; the former would not vote Democratic again until 1918. Additionally, Sawyer County would not vote Democratic again until 1932.

County	Jeremiah M. Rusk Republican		Gilbert M. Woodward Democratic		John Cochrane People's		John M. Olin Prohibition		Margin		Total votes cast
County	#	%	#	%	#	%	#	%	#	%	Total votes cast
Adams	966	73.07%	338	25.57%	2	0.15%	16	1.21%	628	47.50%	1,322
Ashland	1,240	46.18%	1,355	50.47%	49	1.82%	41	1.53%	-115	-4.28%	2.685
Barron	1,134	50.92%	646	29.01%	0	0.00%	447	20.07%	488	21.91%	2,227
Bayfield	539	47.74%	575	50.93%	0	0.00%	15	1.33%	-36	-3.19%	1,129
Brown	2,183	39.23%	2,850	51.22%	383	6.88%	147	2.64%	-667	-11.99%	5,564 (Note: Includes 1 Scattering vote)
Buffalo	1,552	60.67%	957	37.41%	0	0.00%	48	1.88%	595	23.26%	2,558
Burnett	461	75.08%	49	7.98%	0	0.00%	103	16.78%	358 (Note: Rusk's margin over Olin)	48.30%	614
Calumet	879	31.77%	1,720	62.16%	143	5.17%	25	0.90%	-841	-30.39%	2,767
Chippewa	1,888	41.00%	2,406	52.25%	2	0.04%	309	6.71%	-518	-11.25%	4,605
Clark	1,429	49.76%	959	33.39%	257	8.95%	227	7.90%	470	16.36%	2,872
Columbia	2,820	51.31%	2,067	37.61%	6	0.11%	603	10.97%	753	13.70%	5,496
Crawford	1,547	52.18%	1,356	45.73%	0	0.00%	62	2.09%	191	6.44%	2,965
Dane	5,956	47.63%	5,219	41.73%	7	0.06%	1,322	10.57%	737	5.89%	12,506 (Note: Includes 2 Scattering votes)
Dodge	3,289	37.06%	5,096	57.42%	187	2.11%	303	3.41%	-1,807	-20.36%	8,875
Door	1,557	64.63%	776	32.21%	2	0.08%	74	3.07%	781	32.42%	2,409
Douglas	326	49.77%	325	49.62%	0	0.00%	3	0.46%	1	0.15%	655
Dunn	1,749	57.42%	744	24.43%	196	6.43%	357	11.72%	1,005	32.99%	3,046
Eau Claire	2,102	45.88%	1,803	39.35%	37	0.81%	640	13.97%	299	6.53%	4,582
Florence	336	81.95%	74	18.05%	0	0.00%	0	0.00%	262	63.90%	410
Fond du Lac	3,403	41.39%	3,972	48.32%	443	5.39%	402	4.89%	-569	-6.92%	8,221
Forest	153	42.15%	209	57.58%	0	0.00%	1	0.28%	-56	-15.43%	363
Grant	3,642	51.70%	2,684	38.10%	37	0.53%	675	9.58%	958	13.60%	7,045 (Note: Includes 7 Scattering votes)
Green	2,114	46.92%	1,716	38.08%	4	0.09%	672	14.91%	398	8.83%	4,506
Green Lake	1,601	54.90%	1,155	39.61%	2	0.07%	158	5.42%	446	15.29%	2,916
Iowa	2,198	46.84%	1,961	41.79%	1	0.02%	533	11.36%	237	5.05%	4,693
Jackson	1,744	61.06%	827	28.96%	50	1.75%	235	8.23%	917	32.11%	2,856
Jefferson	2,635	41.48%	3,413	53.73%	43	0.68%	261	4.11%	-778	-12.25%	6,352
Juneau	1,882	50.71%	1,585	42.71%	4	0.11%	240	6.47%	297	8.00%	3,711
Kenosha	1,451	49.25%	1,398	47.45%	0	0.00%	95	3.22%	53	1.80%	2,946
Kewaunee	689	26.65%	1,896	73.35%	0	0.00%	0	0.00%	-1,207	-46.69%	2,585
La Crosse	2,418	39.11%	2,824	45.68%	676	10.93%	264	4.27%	-406	-6.57%	6,182
Lafayette	2,264	50.21%	1,873	41.54%	22	0.49%	349	7.74%	391	8.67%	4,509 (Note: Includes 1 Blank vote)
Langlade	713	44.40%	825	51.37%	0	0.00%	67	4.17%	-112	-6.97%	1,606
Lincoln	994	47.83%	939	45.19%	23	1.11%	122	5.87%	55	2.65%	2,078
Manitowoc	2,333	38.28%	3,700	60.71%	53	0.87%	9	0.15%	-1,367	-22.43%	6,095
Marathon	1,923	39.08%	2,608	53.00%	367	7.46%	23	0.47%	-685	-13.92%	4,921
Marinette	1,117	39.95%	594	21.24%	991	35.44%	94	3.36%	128 (Note: Rusk's margin over Cochrane)	4.51%	2,796
Marquette	1,088	52.79%	886	42.99%	4	0.19%	83	4.03%	202	9.80%	2,061
Milwaukee	10,936	34.71%	7,472	23.71%	12,914	40.99%	185	0.59%	-1,978 (Note: Cochrane's margin over Rusk)	-6.28%	31,508
Monroe	2,304	51.08%	1,844	40.88%	5	0.11%	358	7.94%	460	10.20%	4,511
Oconto	1,134	54.94%	851	41.23%	51	2.47%	28	1.36%	283	13.71%	2,064
Outagamie	2,229	35.44%	3,454	54.91%	472	7.50%	135	2.15%	-1,225	-19.48%	6,290
Ozaukee	660	24.39%	1,821	67.29%	213	7.87%	6	0.22%	-1,161	-42.90%	2,706 (Note: Includes 6 Scattering votes)
Pepin	850	54.63%	417	26.80%	0	0.00%	289	18.57%	433	27.83%	1,556
Pierce	2,034	63.88%	817	25.66%	0	0.00%	332	10.43%	1,217	38.22%	3,184
Polk	1,478	68.11%	341	15.71%	0	0.00%	351	16.18%	1,127	51.93%	2,170
Portage	1,858	48.47%	1,754	45.76%	1	0.03%	219	5.71%	104	2.71%	3,833
Price	688	63.59%	376	34.75%	9	0.83%	9	0.83%	312	28.84%	1,082
Racine	2,682	41.22%	1,788	27.48%	1,525	23.44%	511	7.85%	894	13.74%	6,507
Richland	2,292	54.94%	1,527	36.60%	1	0.02%	352	8.44%	765	18.34%	4,172
Rock	4,901	58.52%	2,686	32.07%	2	0.02%	786	9.39%	2,215	26.45%	8,375
Sauk	2,740	51.92%	1,982	37.56%	11	0.21%	544	10.31%	758	14.36%	5,277
Sawyer	228	30.65%	504	67.74%	0	0.00%	12	1.61%	-276	-37.10%	744
Shawano	1,299	49.75%	1,263	48.37%	10	0.38%	39	1.49%	36	1.38%	2,611
Sheboygan	2,779	42.96%	2,985	46.14%	580	8.97%	125	1.93%	-206	-3.18%	6,469
St. Croix	2,229	46.15%	1,794	37.14%	218	4.51%	589	12.19%	435	9.01%	4,830
Taylor	802	56.96%	585	41.55%	13	0.92%	6	0.43%	217	15.41%	1,408
Trempealeau	1,784	56.28%	975	30.76%	1	0.03%	409	12.90%	809	25.52%	3,170
Vernon	2,907	62.73%	1,364	29.43%	20	0.43%	343	7.40%	1,543	33.30%	4,634
Walworth	3,129	58.88%	1,205	22.68%	223	4.20%	757	14.25%	1,924	36.21%	5,314
Washburn	309	45.64%	222	32.79%	0	0.00%	146	21.57%	87	12.85%	677
Washington	1,640	38.82%	2,516	59.55%	35	0.83%	34	0.80%	-876	-20.73%	4,225
Waukesha	3,152	49.03%	2,862	44.52%	2	0.03%	413	6.42%	290	4.51%	6,429
Waupaca	2,911	64.52%	1,344	29.79%	35	0.78%	222	4.92%	1,567	34.73%	4,512
Waushara	1,926	74.74%	438	17.00%	0	0.00%	213	8.27%	1,488	57.74%	2,577
Winnebago	3,783	43.01%	3,288	37.38%	1,116	12.69%	607	6.90%	495	5.63%	8,796
Wood	1,268	42.15%	1,674	55.65%	19	0.63%	44	1.46%	-406	-13.50%	3,008 (Note: Includes 3 Scattering votes)
Total	133,247	46.53%	114,529	39.99%	21,467	7.50%	17,089	5.97%	18,718	6.54%	286,368

==== Counties that flipped from Democratic to Republican ====
- Crawford
- Marquette
- Waukesha

==== Counties that flipped from Republican to Democratic ====
- Ashland
- Bayfield
- Chippewa
- La Crosse
- Sawyer

==== Counties that flipped from Republican to People's ====
- Milwaukee

== Bibliography ==
- Glashan, Roy R. (1979). American Governors and Gubernatorial Elections, 1775-1978. Meckler Books. ISBN 0-930466-17-9.
- Gubernatorial Elections, 1787-1997. Washington, D.C.: Congressional Quarterly Inc. 1998. ISBN 1-56802-396-0.
- Timme, Ernst G., ed. (1887). The Blue Book of the State of Wisconsin. The Milwaukee Litho. & Engr. Co.
