= Harrison Carroll Hobart =

19th century American politician and Union Army colonel

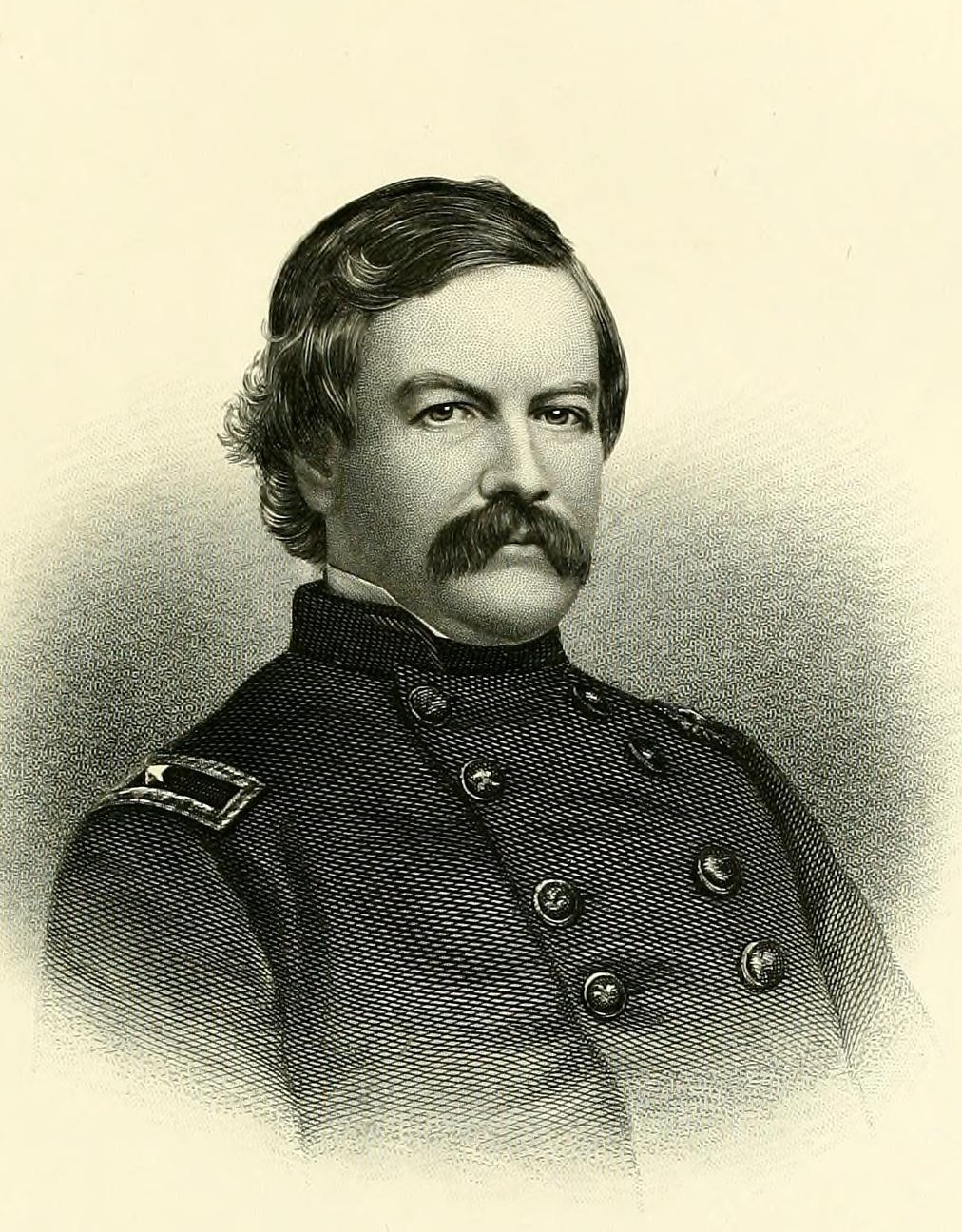

2nd Speaker of the Wisconsin Assembly
- In office January 10, 1849 – January 7, 1850
- Preceded by: Ninian E. Whiteside
- Succeeded by: Moses M. Strong

Member of the Wisconsin Senate from the 1st district
- In office June 5, 1848 – January 1, 1849
- Preceded by: Position Established
- Succeeded by: Lemuel Goodell

Member of the Wisconsin State Assembly
- In office January 7, 1867 – January 6, 1868
- Preceded by: William Pitt Lynde
- Succeeded by: George Abert
- Constituency: Milwaukee 2nd district
- In office January 3, 1859 – January 2, 1860
- Preceded by: James Robinson
- Succeeded by: Asaph Green
- Constituency: Calumet district
- In office January 1, 1849 – January 7, 1850
- Preceded by: Charles E. Morris
- Succeeded by: Horatio N. Smith
- Constituency: Sheboygan 1st district

Member of the House of Representatives of the Wisconsin Territory for Sheboygan and Washington counties
- In office January 4, 1847 – October 18, 1847
- Preceded by: Position Established
- Succeeded by: Benjamin H. Mooers

Personal details
- Born: January 31, 1815 Ashburnham, Massachusetts, US
- Died: January 26, 1902 (aged 86) Milwaukee, Wisconsin, US
- Resting place: Forest Home Cemetery, Milwaukee, Wisconsin
- Party: Democratic
- Spouses: Frances Imogen Lowery (m. 1854; died 1855); Anna Clarence Litch (Mower) (m. 1857; died 1896)
- Education: Dartmouth College
- Profession: lawyer, politician

Military service
- Allegiance: United States
- Branch/service: United States Volunteers; Union Army
- Years of service: 1861–1865
- Rank: Colonel, USV; Brevet Brig. General, USV
- Unit: 4th Reg. Wis. Vol. Infantry
- Commands: 21st Reg. Wis. Vol. Infantry; 1st Bde., 1st Div., XIV Corps
- Battles/wars: American Civil War; Lower Seaboard Theater; Capture of New Orleans; Battle of Baton Rouge (1862); Stones River Campaign; Battle of Stones River; Tullahoma Campaign; Battle of Hoover's Gap; Chickamauga Campaign; Battle of Chickamauga; Atlanta campaign; Battle of Rocky Face Ridge; Battle of Resaca; Battle of Dallas; Battle of Kennesaw Mountain; Battle of Peachtree Creek; Battle of Jonesborough; Savannah Campaign; Carolinas Campaign; Battle of Averasborough; Battle of Bentonville

Harrison Carroll Hobart (January 31, 1815 – January 26, 1902) was an American lawyer, Democratic politician, and Wisconsin pioneer. He served as the 2nd speaker of the Wisconsin State Assembly (1849), and served in the 1st Wisconsin Legislature as a member of the Wisconsin Senate. He was the Democratic nominee for governor of Wisconsin in 1859 and 1865, and was one of the founders of Chilton, Wisconsin.

He served as a Union Army officer throughout the American Civil War; he commanded the 21st Wisconsin Infantry Regiment and its brigade through numerous engagements in the western theater of the war, and was granted an honorary brevet to the rank of brigadier general.

== Early life ==
Harrison Carroll Hobart was born on January 31, 1815, in Ashburnham, Massachusetts. He was raised on his father's farm and received little formal education in his youth. At age 16, he moved to New Hampshire, and worked as an apprentice for three years in the print shop of John Randall Reding. He earned enough to obtain additional schooling at Concord Literary Institute and New Hampton Academy.

He entered Dartmouth College in 1838 and graduated in 1842, supporting himself through college by teaching at the Rochester Academy. While attending Dartmouth, he became one of the founders of the Kappa Kappa Kappa fraternity along with two of his closest companions, Judge Stephen Gordon Nash, and John Dudley Philbrick, all Class of 1842. Hobart was motivated by a spirit of resistance to class oligarchy and social privilege, thus imbuing this spirit into the new organization. After leaving Dartmouth, he studied law in Boston in the office of Robert Rantoul, Jr., and was admitted to the Massachusetts bar in 1845.

== Wisconsin ==
He moved to the Wisconsin Territory the following year and settled near Sheboygan, on the coast of Lake Michigan. He quickly became a prominent lawyer in the area and became involved in local politics as a member of the Democratic Party.

In 1847, Hobart served in the Wisconsin Territorial House of Representatives, the lower house of the territory's Legislative Assembly. After Wisconsin became a state, he was elected to represent Wisconsin's 1st State Senate district (Brown, Calumet, Manitowoc, and Sheboygan counties) in the 1st Wisconsin Legislature meeting in 1848. In the fall of 1848, he was elected to the Wisconsin State Assembly for 1849 and was chosen as Speaker by the Assembly membership at the start of the session. His old Senate seat was taken by fellow Democrat Lemuel Goodell.

In 1850, he was nominated by the Democratic Party to be their candidate for Congress in Wisconsin's 3rd congressional district over incumbent Democrat and former Wisconsin territorial Governor, James Duane Doty. Rather than retiring, Doty chose to run as an Independent Democrat in the election and easily defeated Hobart.

In 1854, he moved west into Calumet County and became one of the founders of the city of Chilton, Wisconsin. In 1856, he was again the Democratic nominee for Congress in the 3rd district and was defeated again, this time by Republican incumbent Charles Billinghurst. He was elected to represent the county in the Wisconsin State Assembly for the 1859 session. During this session, he was the author of an act to incorporate a railroad to operate from Milwaukee to Green Bay, which later became part of the Chicago, Milwaukee, St. Paul and Pacific Railroad. He was also chosen by the legislature in 1859 as a member of the University of Wisconsin Board of Regents. Hobart was then the Democratic candidate for Governor of Wisconsin in the 1859 election, but was defeated by incumbent Republican Alexander Randall.

== American Civil War ==
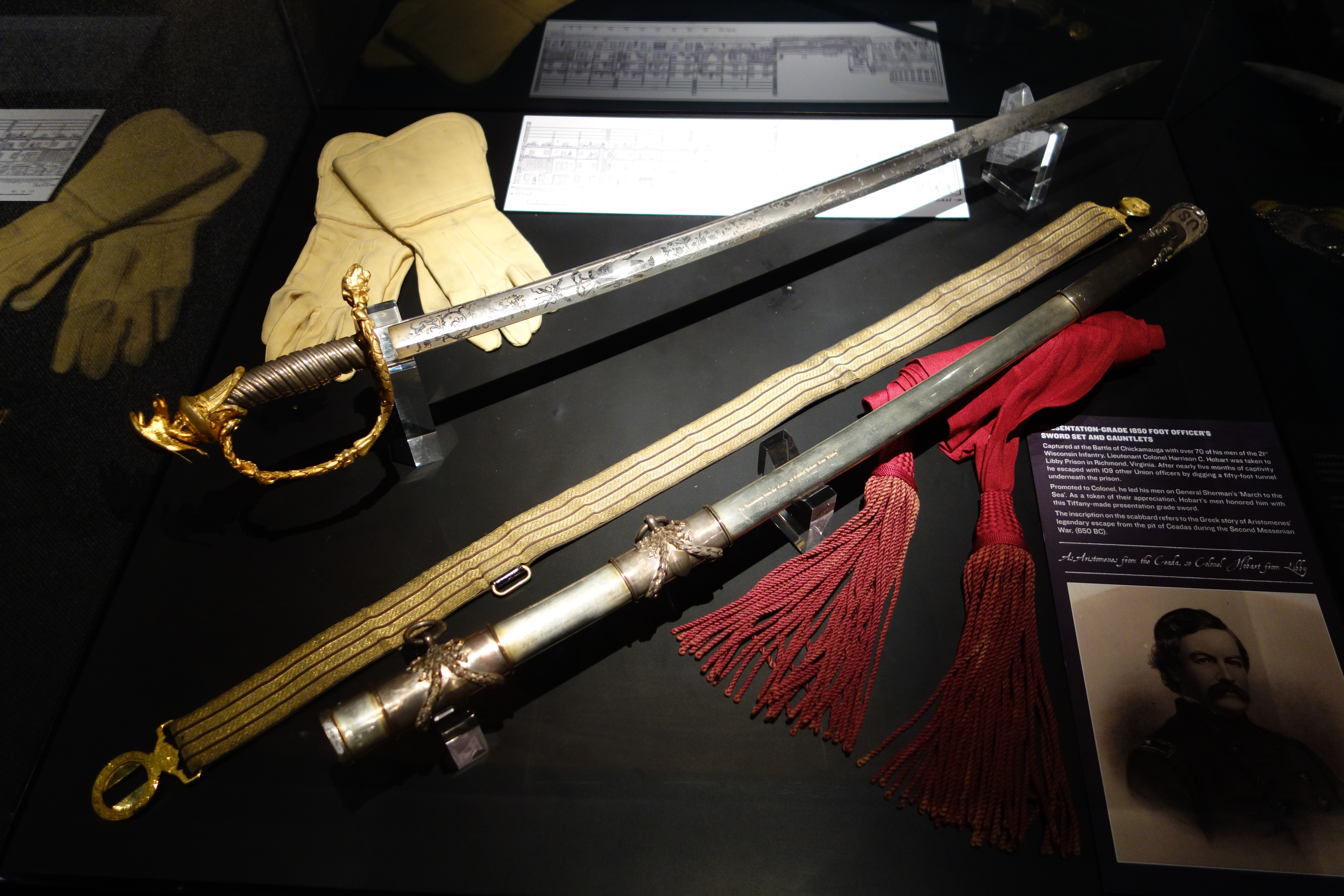
Hobart's sword, made by Tiffany & Co., at Wisconsin Veterans Museum

Hobart enlisted two weeks after the outbreak of the American Civil War and helped raise a company of volunteers for the Union Army from the Chilton area. The company elected him Captain, and called themselves the "Calumet Rifles".

=== Louisiana Campaign ===
His volunteers were organized into Company K of the 4th Wisconsin Infantry Regiment at Camp Utley in Racine. The regiment mustered into service on July 2, 1861, and traveled to garrison in Maryland. They were attached to the Army of the Gulf and sent to Louisiana to attempt to regain control over the Mississippi River system. Hobart and the 4th Infantry participated in the successful capture of New Orleans and Baton Rouge.

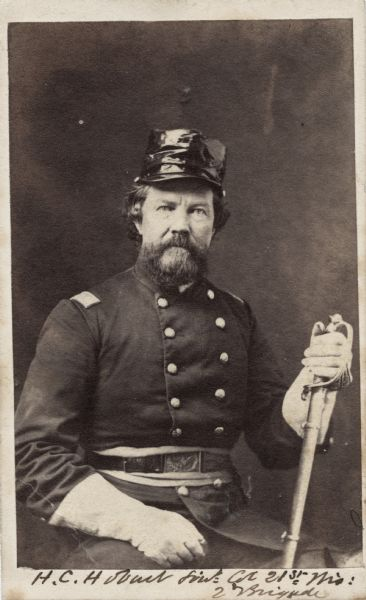
Hobart after his promotion to lt. colonel

=== Tennessee ===
In 1862, Hobart left the 4th Infantry to accept promotion to Lieutenant Colonel with the newly organized 21st Wisconsin Volunteer Infantry Regiment. The regiment left Wisconsin in September 1862, but Hobart would not rendezvous with them until a month later due to travel time from Louisiana. Before Hobart's arrival, the 21st had marched to join the Army of Ohio, which had been carrying out a defense against the Confederate Heartland Offensive in Kentucky. At the Battle of Perryville, the regiment took significant casualties, and their commander, Colonel Benjamin Sweet, was wounded.

Hobart met the 21st at Lebanon, Kentucky, shortly after Perryville. The 21st was now organized under Major General William Rosecrans' Army of the Cumberland, engaged in a counter-offensive against Confederate forces in Tennessee. With Colonel Sweet incapacitated, Hobart took command of the regiment and lead them at the battles of Stones River and Hoover's Gap. General Lovell Rousseau, in his report on the battle of Stones River, mentioned Hobart and the 21st for their good conduct. After the Union successes in central Tennessee, the 21st advanced toward Chattanooga with the Army of the Cumberland, eventually pushing into Georgia.

At the Battle of Chickamauga, on September 20, 1863, after a day of heavy fighting, the Union forces were given orders to withdraw. The 21st did not receive the orders and held their position until they noticed other regiments falling back. Hobart ordered the regiment to retreat to the second line of defenses, where they continued to hold until nearly surrounded by Confederate forces. While attempting to break out of this encirclement, Lt. Col. Hobart was wounded and taken prisoner along with about 70 of his regiment. The remainder of the regiment retreated toward Chattanooga.

=== Escape from Captivity ===
Hobart was sent to Libby Prison in Richmond, Virginia. There, he helped lead the escape of 109 Union prisoners through a tunnel out of the prison on February 9, 1864. Hobart was tasked with closing off the tunnel after the last escapee had gone through. Roughly half the men made it back to Union lines, including Hobart.

=== Georgia Campaign ===
Hobart rejoined the 21st Regiment in April 1864 at Lookout Mountain, Tennessee, where they had been stationed since the retreat from Chickamauga. The regiment marched from Lookout Mountain on May 2 to join the Atlanta campaign, attached to General William Tecumseh Sherman's army. At the Battle of Rocky Face Ridge, the 21st joined in the flanking maneuver that forced the Confederates to abandon their position and fall back toward Resaca. At the Battle of Resaca, the 21st was again engaged in heavy fighting, as their brigade was ordered to assault the enemy fortifications. A few days later, at the Battle of Dallas, the regiment held a defensive position under heavy fire for six days. They received the compliments of their brigade commander, General William Carlin, for their fortitude and gallantry.

The 21st, with its brigade, pursued retreating Confederate forces, engaging them in skirmishes near Big Shanty. They drove a North Carolina regiment from their position, taking captives, and moved into position before Kennesaw Mountain. The regiment received severe bombardment during the Battle of Kennesaw Mountain, but held their ground until Sherman's flanking maneuver forced the enemy to abandon their position. After Kennesaw, Lt. Col. Hobart was assigned to command three regiments of the first Brigade, and Major Michael H. Fitch was assigned to replace him as commander of the 21st Regiment.

After the Battle of Jonesborough, Hobart and the 21st camped at Atlanta in September 1864. The 21st was reinforced by incorporating the remaining forces of the 1st and 10th Wisconsin Regiments. At this time, Lt. Colonel Hobart was also promoted to Colonel and placed in command of the 1st Brigade, 1st Division, XIV Corps.

XIV Corps now joined Sherman's Savannah Campaign, his "March to the Sea". Though they did not see significant fighting, they participated in the burning of Marietta, Georgia, and foraged for food and supplies to provision the army during its march. Upon reaching Savannah, on December 21, General Sherman recommended Colonel Hobart for brevet to Brigadier General.

On January 23, 1865, President Abraham Lincoln sent Hobart's nomination for brevet Brigadier General, United States Volunteers, effective retroactively from January 12, 1865, to the United States Senate, which confirmed the award on February 14, 1865. (Note: Even though Colonel Hobart filled the position of a brigadier general from November 5, 1864, through June 8, 1865, he was appointed only to the honorary grade of brevet brigadier general, not to the actual, substantive grade of brigadier general.)

=== Carolinas Campaign ===
In January, Sherman initiated his Campaign of the Carolinas, and Hobart led his brigade north with General Henry Warner Slocum's left column, engaging in a scorched earth march as they passed north of Columbia, South Carolina, and continued into North Carolina. Hobart's brigade led the advance out of Fayetteville and encountered the enemy, skirmishing with them at the Battle of Averasborough, and then confronting the Confederate counterattack at the Battle of Bentonville. Hobart was conspicuous at Bentonville, leading three regiments of his brigade in repelling the enemy attack. This was their last significant fighting of the war. Hobart's brigade reached Goldsboro, North Carolina, on March 23 and was the first unit to enter Raleigh on April 13.

Hobart and his brigade remained in Raleigh until the announcement of the end of the war. Hobart was discharged on June 16, 1865.

== Postbellum years ==
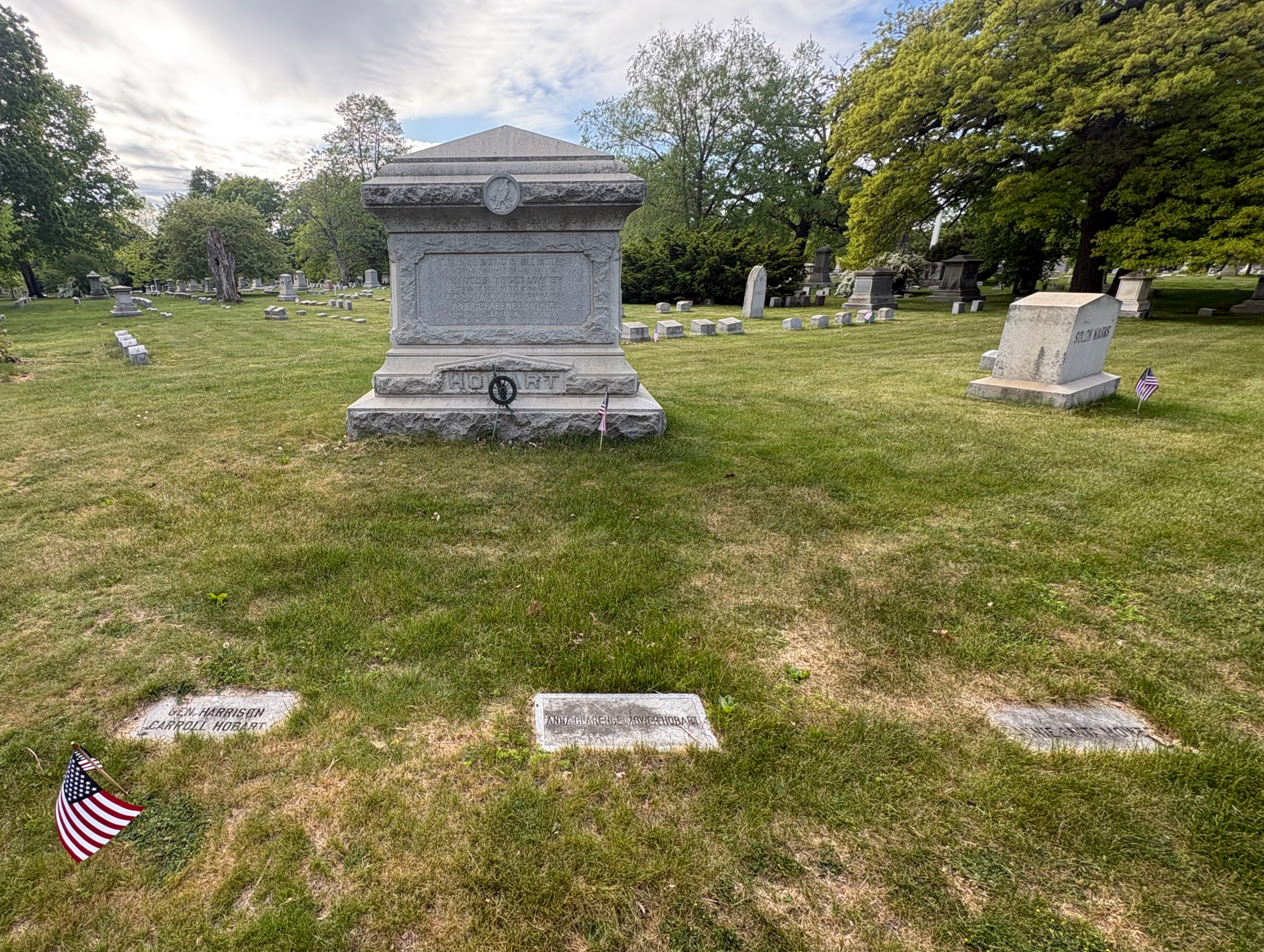
Hobart's grave at Forest Home Cemetery

After the war's end, he again ran unsuccessfully for Governor of Wisconsin. He served in the State Assembly for a final time in 1867. Later, Hobart served on the Milwaukee Common Council and was president of the common council; he would also serve as acting mayor of Milwaukee. Hobart was the co-author of the book The Citizen Soldier, the autobiography of General John Beatty from 1879. Besides regular mentions, it has a chapter written by him dedicated to his time and escape from Libby Prison. He died on January 26, 1902, in Milwaukee, Wisconsin, and is buried in Forest Home Cemetery.

== Personal life and legacy ==
Hobart married Ms. Frances Imogen Lowery, of Troy, New York, on February 2, 1854. She died only a year later, on March 5, 1855. His second wife was Anna Clarence Mower (née Litch), the widow of Samuel F. Mower, a Boston merchant with whom she had two children. Hobart and Mrs. Mower were married on June 8, 1857. Hobart had no known children of his own.

In 1888, Hobart turned over a share of his land in Chilton for use as a city park. The park is named "Hobart Park" in his honor and is part of the current Calumet County Fair Grounds.

== Electoral history ==
=== Wisconsin Senate (1848) ===
Wisconsin Senate, 1st District Special Election, 1848
Party	Candidate	Votes	%	±%
Special Election, May 8, 1848
Democratic	Harrison C. Hobart	567	61.10%	
Whig	Timothy O. Howe	361	38.90%	
Plurality		206	22.20%	
Total votes		928	100.0%	
Democratic win (new seat)				

=== U.S. House of Representatives (1850) ===
Wisconsin's 3rd Congressional District Election, 1850
Party	Candidate	Votes	%	±%
General Election, November 5, 1850
Independent Democrat	James Duane Doty (incumbent)	11,159	67.12%	
Democratic	Harrison C. Hobart	5,371	32.31%	
	Scattering	95	0.57%	
Plurality		5,788	34.82%	
Total votes		16,625	100.0%	+45.65%
Democratic hold				

=== U.S. House of Representatives (1856) ===
Wisconsin's 3rd Congressional District Election, 1856
Party	Candidate	Votes	%	±%
General Election, November 4, 1856
Republican	Charles Billinghurst (incumbent)	26,092	52.04%	−3.90%
Democratic	Harrison C. Hobart	24,045	47.96%	+11.96%
Plurality		2,047	4.08%	-15.86%
Total votes		50,137	100.0%	+109.96%
Republican hold				

=== Wisconsin Governor (1859) ===
Wisconsin Gubernatorial Election, 1859
Party	Candidate	Votes	%	±%
General Election, November 8, 1859
Republican	Alexander Randall (incumbent)	59,999	53.21%	+3.58%
Democratic	Harrison C. Hobart	52,539	46.60%	−2.53%
	Scattering	83	0.07%	
Total votes		112,755	100.0%	+25.20%
Republican hold				

=== Wisconsin Governor (1865) ===
Wisconsin Gubernatorial Election, 1865
Party	Candidate	Votes	%	±%
General Election, November 7, 1865
Republican	Lucius Fairchild	58,332	54.68%	−4.91%
Democratic	Harrison C. Hobart	48,330	45.31%	5.11%
	Scattering	12	0.01%	
Total votes		106,674	100.0%	-12.58%
Republican hold				

=== Wisconsin Assembly (1866) ===
Wisconsin Assembly, Milwaukee 2nd District Election, 1866
Party	Candidate	Votes	%	±%
General Election, November 6, 1866
Democratic	Harrison C. Hobart	538	61.98%	
Republican	E. L. Phelps	330	38.02%	
Plurality		208	23.96%	
Total votes		868	100.0%	
Democratic hold				

== See also ==
- List of kidnappings
- List of solved missing person cases (pre-1950)

== Notes ==
Military offices
Preceded by Col. Benjamin Sweet	Command of the 21st Wisconsin Infantry Regiment; October 8, 1862 – September 20, 1863	Succeeded by Cpt. Charles H. Walker
Preceded by Cpt. Charles H. Walker	Command of the 21st Wisconsin Infantry Regiment; April 1864 – September 1864	Succeeded by Ltc. Michael H. Fitch
Party political offices
Preceded by James B. Cross	Democratic nominee for Governor of Wisconsin; 1859	Succeeded by Benjamin Ferguson
Preceded by Henry L. Palmer	Democratic nominee for Governor of Wisconsin; 1865	Succeeded by John J. Tallmadge
Wisconsin State Assembly
Preceded by Charles E. Morris	Member of the Wisconsin State Assembly from the Sheboygan 1st district January 1, 1849 – January 7, 1850	Succeeded by Horatio N. Smith
Preceded by James Robinson	Member of the Wisconsin State Assembly from the Calumet district January 3, 1859 – January 2, 1860	Succeeded by Asaph Green
Preceded by William Pitt Lynde	Member of the Wisconsin State Assembly from the Milwaukee 2nd district January 7, 1867 – January 6, 1868	Succeeded by George Abert
Preceded by Ninian E. Whiteside	Speaker of the Wisconsin State Assembly; January 10, 1849 – January 7, 1850	Succeeded by Moses M. Strong
Wisconsin Senate
New state government	Member of the Wisconsin Senate from the 1st district June 5, 1848 – January 1, 1849	Succeeded by Lemuel Goodell
