= Samuel S. Burton =

19th century American politician

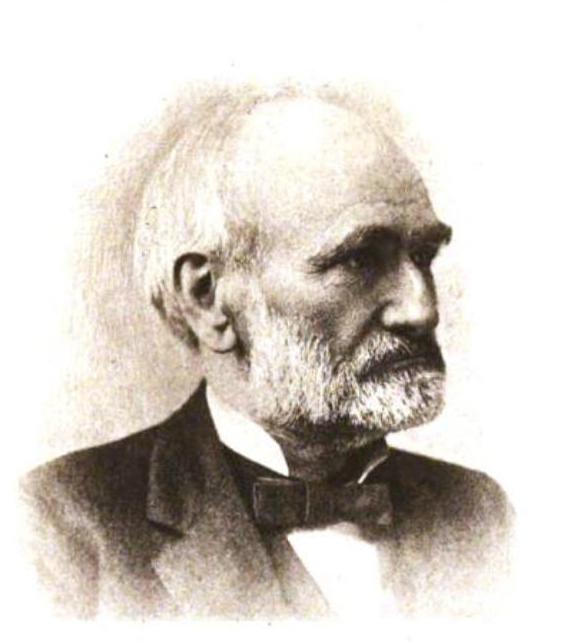
- Portrait from Descendants of Josiah Burton of Manchester, Vermont (1926)

Member of the Wisconsin State Assembly from the La Crosse district
- In office January 4, 1864 – January 2, 1865
- Preceded by: Enos M. Philips
- Succeeded by: Townsend N. Horton

County Judge of La Crosse County, Wisconsin
- In office May 20, 1859 – January 1, 1866
- Appointed by: Alexander Randall
- Preceded by: James I. Lyndes
- Succeeded by: Hugh Cameron

Personal details
- Born: April 10, 1822 Manchester, Vermont, U.S.
- Died: December 22, 1892 (aged 70) La Crosse, Wisconsin, U.S.
- Cause of death: Gangrene
- Resting place: Oak Grove Cemetery, La Crosse, Wisconsin
- Spouse: Mary-Ann Munson (m. 1857; died 1881)
- Children: Emily Burton^{(b. 1858; died 1858)}; Anne Burton^{(b. 1859; died 1860)}; Munson Burton^{(b. 1870; died 1949)}

Samuel Seward Burton (April 10, 1822 – December 22, 1892) was an American lawyer, judge, and banker. He served one term in the Wisconsin State Assembly, representing La Crosse County, and was county judge of La Crosse County for 6 years.

== Biography ==
Samuel Burton was born in April 1822 at Manchester, Vermont. He was raised on his father's farm and was educated at the Burr and Burton Academy in Manchester. He read law in the office of his cousin, Judge Elias Black Burton, and his partner Ahiman Louis Miner, and was admitted to the bar in 1850. He then joined his cousin's law firm and practiced with them until the firm dissolved in 1857.

He moved to La Crosse, Wisconsin, in April 1857 and participated in a law firm known as Tucker, Burton & Morse. He left the firm when he was appointed county judge by Governor Alexander Randall in May 1859. He filled the 30 months remaining of the judicial term, and was then elected to a full term, serving until January 1866.

While serving as judge, he was elected to the Wisconsin State Assembly in November 1863, running on the National Union ticket. He was appointed receiver of public moneys at the land office in La Crosse in 1867, serving until 1875. During that time he also formed a legal partnership with Gilbert M. Woodward, known as Burton & Woodward, which endured until 1877.

He was then appointed receiver of the First Bank of La Crosse after its failure in April 1876. The next year he abandoned the legal profession in order to assist in the organization of the National Bank of La Crosse. He served as "cashier" (comptroller) of the bank until his death.

He died of gangrene in December 1892.

== Personal life and family ==
Samuel Burton was a son of Joseph Burton and his wife Anna (née Benedict). Joseph Burton served with the Vermont militia during the War of 1812 and established a farm near Manchester. His grandfather, Josiah Burton, served in the American Revolutionary War. The Burtons are descended from Solomon Burton, who immigrated to Connecticut Colony from England about 1687.

Samuel Burton married Mary-Ann Munson in Manchester on October 8, 1857. Munson and Burton were second cousins. They had three children together, but only one survived infancy. His wife died of cancer in 1882.

Wisconsin State Assembly
Preceded by Enos M. Philips	Member of the Wisconsin State Assembly from the La Crosse district January 4, 1864 – January 2, 1865	Succeeded by Townsend N. Horton
Legal offices
Preceded by James I. Lyndes	County Judge of La Crosse County, Wisconsin; May 20, 1859 – January 1, 1866	Succeeded by Hugh Cameron
