= James J. Hogan =

19th century American politician

36th Speaker of the Wisconsin State Assembly
- In office January 14, 1891 – January 2, 1893
- Preceded by: Thomas Brooks Mills
- Succeeded by: Edward Keogh

Member of the Wisconsin State Assembly from the La Crosse 1st district
- In office January 7, 1889 – January 2, 1893
- Preceded by: David Vaughan (whole county)
- Succeeded by: Alfred August Leissring

17th Mayor of La Crosse, Wisconsin
- In office April 1875 – April 1877
- Preceded by: Gilbert M. Woodward
- Succeeded by: George Edwards

Personal details
- Born: July 6, 1837 St. John's, Newfoundland Colony
- Died: September 8, 1914 (aged 77) Wauwatosa, Wisconsin, U.S.
- Resting place: Oak Grove Cemetery, La Crosse, Wisconsin
- Party: Democratic
- Spouse: Amanda Cook (died 1915)
- Children: Gertrude M. Hogan^{(b. 1865; died 1945)}; James Cook Hogan^{(b. 1877; died 1925)}
- Occupation: Grocer

James Joseph Hogan (July 6, 1837 – September 8, 1914) was a grocer, Democratic politician, and Wisconsin pioneer who was a native of British North America. He was the 17th mayor of La Crosse, Wisconsin, and the 36th speaker of the Wisconsin State Assembly.

== Biography ==
Hogan was born on July 6, 1837, in St. John's, Newfoundland Colony. He worked in the grocery business in La Crosse, Wisconsin. Hogan was also involved in the logging and lumber business. Hogan served as mayor of La Crosse in 1875 and 1876. He died on September 8, 1914.

== Assembly career ==
Hogan was a member of the Wisconsin State Assembly during the 1889 and 1891 sessions. In 1891, he was selected as Speaker. He was a Democrat.

Wisconsin State Assembly
Preceded by David Vaughan (whole county)	Member of the Wisconsin State Assembly from the La Crosse 1st district January 7, 1889 – January 2, 1893	Succeeded by Alfred August Leissring
Preceded by Thomas Brooks Mills	Speaker of the Wisconsin State Assembly; January 14, 1891 – January 2, 1893	Succeeded by Edward Keogh
Political offices
Preceded by Gilbert M. Woodward	Mayor of La Crosse, Wisconsin; April 1875 – April 1877	Succeeded by George Edwards
