= James B. Cross =

19th century American politician, 9th Mayor of Milwaukee, Wisconsin

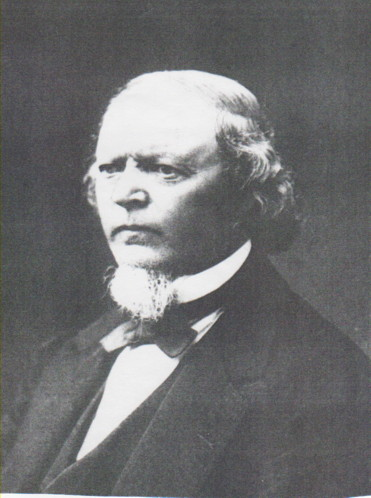

9th Mayor of Milwaukee
- In office March 23, 1855 – April 1858
- Preceded by: Byron Kilbourn
- Succeeded by: William A. Prentiss

Member of the Wisconsin State Assembly from the Milwaukee 1st district
- In office January 10, 1855 – January 9, 1856
- Preceded by: John Crawford
- Succeeded by: Joshua Stark
- In office January 10, 1849 – January 8, 1851
- Preceded by: Edward Wunderly
- Succeeded by: William K. Wilson

Personal details
- Born: James B. Cross; December 17, 1819 Phelps, New York, U.S.
- Died: February 3, 1876 (aged 56) Milwaukee, Wisconsin, US
- Resting place: Forest Home Cemetery, Milwaukee, Wisconsin
- Party: Democratic
- Spouses: Catherine L. Fuller (m. 1856; died 1857); Eunice G. Osborn (m. 1859)
- Children: At least 3
- Profession: lawyer, politician

James B. Cross (December 17, 1819 – February 3, 1876) was an American lawyer and politician who served as the 9th mayor of Milwaukee, Wisconsin (1855–1858). A Democrat, Cross also represented Milwaukee for three terms in the Wisconsin State Assembly, and was the Party's nominee for Governor of Wisconsin in the 1857 election.

== Background and public office ==
Cross was born in Phelps, New York, in 1819. In 1841, he moved to Milwaukee to practice law. Cross served as probate judge in 1848. He then served three terms as a member of the Wisconsin State Assembly in 1849, 1850, and 1855, representing Milwaukee County's First Assembly district.

Cross served for three terms as mayor of Milwaukee from April 1855 to April 1858. The Milwaukee Police Department came into being while Cross was mayor. Before this time, the Milwaukee County Sheriff and his deputy maintained law and order. He was a Wisconsin delegate at the Democratic National Convention in Cincinnati, Ohio on June 2, 1856.

== Run for governor ==
Cross ran as the Democratic nominee for Governor of Wisconsin in 1857, but he was accused of financial maladministration during his terms as mayor; and his political association with former Governor (and fellow Democrat) William A. Barstow hindered his gubernatorial campaign. He lost to Republican Alexander Randall in a close vote, 44,239 to 44,693.

== Life outside public office ==
Cross was said to be deeply disappointed by the outcome of the gubernatorial election—though he came within 500 votes of victory—and mostly retired from political life afterwards. In his later years, Cross ran the Juneau National Bank from 1857 to 1862 and then worked in the liquor business from 1867 to 1876. Cross also worked at the post office, rising to head clerk by the time of his death.

He died of a stroke at his home on the morning of February 3, 1876.

== Personal life and family ==
Cross was married twice. He was married to Catherine Fuller in 1856, but she died less than a year later. He subsequently married Eunice G. Osborn and had at least three children. One of his children, James Jr., died in a drowning accident at age 8. He was survived by his second wife and two living children.

== Electoral history ==
Wisconsin Gubernatorial Election, 1857
Party	Candidate	Votes	%	±%
General Election, November 3, 1857
Republican	Alexander Randall	44,693	49.63%	−0.23%
Democratic	James B. Cross	44,239	49.12%	−0.95%
	Scattering	1,126	1.25%	
Plurality		454	0.50%	+0.29%
Total votes		90,058	100.0%	+24.05%
Republican hold				

Party political offices
Preceded by William A. Barstow	Democratic nominee for Governor of Wisconsin; 1857	Succeeded by Harrison Carroll Hobart
Wisconsin State Assembly
Preceded by Edward Wunderly	Member of the Wisconsin State Assembly for the Milwaukee 1st district January 10, 1849 – January 8, 1851	Succeeded by William K. Wilson
Preceded by John Crawford	Member of the Wisconsin State Assembly for the Milwaukee 1st district January 10, 1855 – January 9, 1856	Succeeded by Joshua Stark
Political offices
Preceded by Byron Kilbourn	Mayor of Milwaukee; 1855 – 1858	Succeeded by William A. Prentiss
