= Butler Noble =

American politician (1815-1890)

Butler G. Noble

7th Lieutenant Governor of Wisconsin
- In office January 2, 1860 – January 6, 1862
- Governor: Alexander W. Randall
- Preceded by: Erasmus D. Campbell
- Succeeded by: Edward Salomon

Member of the Wisconsin State Assembly from the Walworth 3rd district
- In office January 4, 1858 – January 3, 1859
- Preceded by: Solmous Wakeley
- Succeeded by: Newton S. Murphy

Personal details
- Born: Butler Gilbert Noble; September 27, 1815 Geneva, New York, U.S.
- Died: October 25, 1890 (aged 75) Williamsburg, Brooklyn, New York, U.S.
- Resting place: Westfield Cemetery, Westfield, New York
- Party: Republican
- Spouse: Mary Spencer (m. 1856; died 1890)
- Children: Sarah; Louis

Butler Gilbert Noble (September 27, 1815 – October 25, 1890) was an American customs agent and Republican politician. He served as the 7th lieutenant governor of Wisconsin, serving during the second term of governor Alexander Randall (1860–1862). He also served one term in the Wisconsin State Assembly, representing Walworth County. After his term as lieutenant governor, he moved to New York City and was employed in a series of political patronage jobs in the harbor and customs house.

== Biography ==
He was born in Geneva, New York. He moved to Wisconsin in 1850. He soon joined the Republican Party. He served as a member of the Wisconsin State Assembly, from Whitewater, Wisconsin, in 1858, and was elected lieutenant governor at the end of the next year, a position in which he served from 1860 until 1862. In 1864, he moved to New York City, where he held jobs first as a weigher in the customs house, then as a harbor master, then as chief clerk in the seizure room. He died in 1890, from a stroke, in Brooklyn.

== Electoral history ==
=== Wisconsin Lieutenant Governor (1859) ===
Wisconsin Lieutenant Gubernatorial Election, 1859
Party	Candidate	Votes	%	±%
Republican	Butler Noble	63,147	51.24%	+1.32pp
Democratic	Henry L. Palmer	60,093	48.76%	−1.28pp
Plurality		3,054	2.48%	+2.36pp
Total votes		123,240	100.00%	+38.66%
Republican gain from Democratic				

== Sources ==
- "Wisconsin Constitutional Officers; Lieutenant Governors" (PDF). State of Wisconsin Blue Book 2005–2006. Wisconsin Legislative Reference Bureau. July 2005. p. 31. Archived from the original (PDF) on October 25, 2007.
- "Butler Noble". Office of the Lieutenant Governor. Archived from the original on May 28, 2010.

Party political offices
Preceded by Carl Schurz	Republican nominee for Lieutenant Governor of Wisconsin; 1859	Succeeded by Edward Salomon
Political offices
Preceded by Erasmus D. Campbell	Lieutenant Governor of Wisconsin; 1860–1862	Succeeded by Edward Salomon
