= Edward Wunderly =

American politician

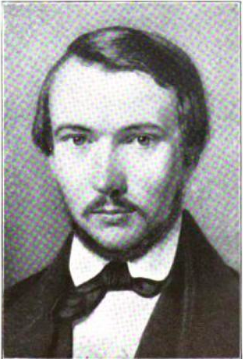
Dr. Edward Wunderly, native of the Duchy of Nassau, d. 1859

Edward Wunderly (1818–1859) was an American medical doctor and politician from Milwaukee, Wisconsin.

== Life ==
A native of Bad Soden in the Duchy of Nassau, he initially came to the United States in 1845 as part of the Mainzer Adelsverein project to establish a German colony in the Republic of Texas.

He moved to Milwaukee in 1846, set up practice there, and quickly became involved in local politics. As a Democrat, he served as a member of the 1st Wisconsin Legislature elected in 1848, representing the 1st Milwaukee County district (the 1st Ward of the City of Milwaukee) of the Wisconsin House of Representatives. He was succeeded by fellow Democrat James B. Cross. Wunderly was later associated with the Whig and Free Soil parties. In 1853 he was elected to the Milwaukee Common Council from the 5th Ward. In 1854, Wunderly was elected a delegate to the first state convention of the new Republican Party. He died in 1859.
