= Charles E. Morris =

19th-century member of the Wisconsin State Assembly

Charles E. Morris was a member of the Wisconsin State Assembly.

== Biography ==
Morris was born in Utica, New York in 1814. In 1839, he settled in what would become Sheboygan, Wisconsin, where he was an attorney. Later, Morris briefly worked as a merchant in Quincy, Illinois before returning to Sheboygan. He died there on August 8, 1902. He was elected county judge of what would be Sheboygan County, Wisconsin in 1843. He would serve three terms in the position. Morris was a member of the Assembly during the 1848 session. He was a Democrat.
