= 1859 Wisconsin gubernatorial election =

- November 8, 1859
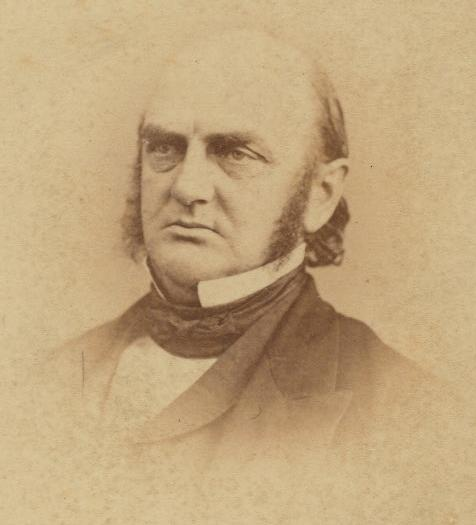

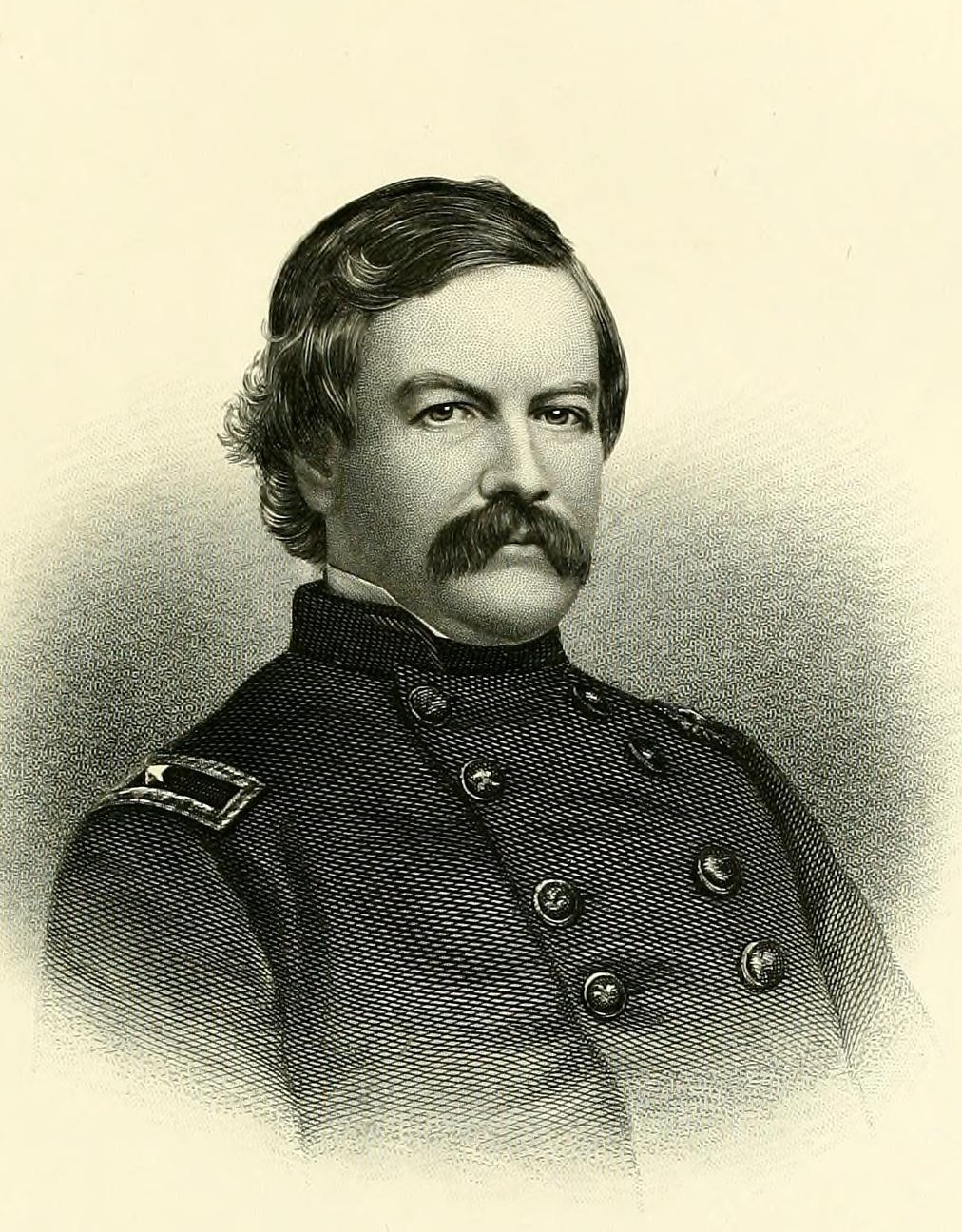
Nominee	Alexander W. Randall	Harrison Carroll Hobart
Party	Republican	Democratic
Popular vote	59,999	52,539
Percentage	53.21%	46.60%
- County results Randall: 50–60% 60–70% 70–80% Hobart: 50–60% 60–70% 70–80%
Governor before election
Alexander W. Randall
Republican
Elected Governor
Alexander W. Randall
Republican

The 1859 Wisconsin gubernatorial election was held on November 8, 1859. Republican Party incumbent Governor Alexander Randall won re-election with 53% of the vote, defeating Democratic candidate Harrison Carroll Hobart.

This election was one of only four occasions in which a Democrat has carried Door County and the only time in the 19th century; Door County would not vote Democratic again until 1904. (Note: Besides 1859 and 1904, the only other two gubernatorial elections in which a Democrat has carried Door County are 2006 and 2022.)

== Nominations ==
=== Republican party ===
Alexander W. Randall was the incumbent Governor, having been elected in the 1857 election. He had previously served as a Wisconsin Circuit Court Judge in Milwaukee, and served one term in the Wisconsin State Assembly in 1855. Earlier, in 1846, Randall had been a delegate to the first Wisconsin constitutional convention and had successfully advocated for including a provision by which African American suffrage could be legalized via referendum.

=== Democratic party ===
Harrison Carroll Hobart was a member of the Wisconsin State Assembly at the time of the election, representing Calumet County. He had previously served as Speaker of the Assembly in the 1849 session, and was state senator for the 1st district in the 1st Wisconsin Legislature.

== Results ==
1859 Wisconsin gubernatorial election
Party	Candidate	Votes	%	±%
Republican	Alexander Randall (incumbent)	59,999	53.21%	+3.18%
Democratic	Harrison Carroll Hobart	52,539	46.60%	−3.31%
	Scattering	217 (Note: The canvass gives the Scattering total as 83, but the column for Scattering also notes 134 votes for "Harrison" in Dodge County and these are enumerated separately in the certificate.)	0.19%	
Majority		7,460	6.62%	
Total votes		112,755	100.00%	
Republican hold		Swing	+6.49%	

=== Results by county ===
County	Alexander Randall Republican		Harrison C. Hobart Democratic		Scattering Write-in		Margin		Total votes cast
County	#	%	#	%	#	%	#	%	Total votes cast
Adams	594	66.89%	293	33.00%	1	0.11%	301	33.90%	888
Bad Ax	995	61.65%	619	38.35%	0	0.00%	376	23.30%	1,614
Brown	423	28.35%	1,066	71.45%	3	0.20%	-643	-43.10%	1,492
Buffalo (Note: The votes from this county were rejected by the Board of Canvassers and are not included in the statewide totals.)	264	38.94%	414	61.06%	0	0.00%	-150	-22.12%	678
Calumet	518	43.13%	683	56.87%	0	0.00%	-165	-13.74%	1,201
Chippewa	156	38.61%	248	61.39%	0	0.00%	-92	-22.77%	404
Clark	71	62.83%	42	37.17%	0	0.00%	29	25.66%	113
Columbia	2,595	61.19%	1,645	38.79%	1	0.02%	950	22.40%	4,241
Crawford	619	45.28%	748	54.72%	0	0.00%	-129	-9.44%	1,367
Dane	3,727	48.99%	3,880	51.00%	1	0.01%	-153	-2.01%	7,608
Dodge	3,492	46.65%	3,856	51.51%	138	1.84%	-364	-4.86%	7,486
Door	72	48.00%	78	52.00%	0	0.00%	-6	-4.00%	150
Douglas	34	36.17%	60	63.83%	0	0.00%	-26	-27.66%	94
Dunn	192	52.32%	175	47.68%	0	0.00%	17	4.63%	367
Eau Claire	320	57.87%	233	42.13%	0	0.00%	87	15.73%	553
Fond du Lac	3,214	55.92%	2,530	44.02%	3	0.05%	684	11.90%	5,747
Grant	2,496	59.22%	1,715	40.69%	4	0.09%	781	18.53%	4,215
Green	1,726	60.20%	1,141	39.80%	0	0.00%	585	20.40%	2,867
Green Lake	1,453	68.70%	662	31.30%	0	0.00%	791	37.40%	2,115
Iowa	1,454	52.30%	1,320	47.48%	6	0.22%	134	4.82%	2,780
Jackson	494	62.77%	293	37.23%	0	0.00%	201	25.54%	787
Jefferson	2,327	48.08%	2,512	51.90%	1	0.02%	-185	-3.82%	4,840
Juneau	1,060	54.81%	874	45.19%	0	0.00%	186	9.62%	1,934
Kenosha	1,321	59.32%	906	40.68%	0	0.00%	415	18.63%	2,227
Kewaunee	167	22.75%	567	77.25%	0	0.00%	-400	-54.50%	734
La Crosse	1,219	53.99%	1,034	45.79%	5	0.22%	185	8.19%	2,258
La Pointe	72	39.78%	109	60.22%	0	0.00%	-37	-20.44%	181
Lafayette	1,102	42.11%	1,514	57.85%	1	0.04%	-412	-15.74%	2,617
Manitowoc	704	24.76%	2,134	75.06%	5	0.18%	-1,430	-50.30%	2,843
Marathon	206	28.81%	509	71.19%	0	0.00%	-303	-42.38%	715
Marquette	586	42.53%	792	57.47%	0	0.00%	-206	-14.95%	1,378
Milwaukee	2,811	30.99%	6,261	69.01%	0	0.00%	-3,450	-38.03%	9,072
Monroe	939	61.90%	578	38.10%	0	0.00%	361	23.80%	1,517
Oconto	352	44.44%	440	55.56%	0	0.00%	-88	-11.11%	792
Outagamie	494	40.23%	733	59.69%	1	0.08%	-239	-19.46%	1,228
Ozaukee	627	28.45%	1,577	71.55%	0	0.00%	-950	-43.10%	2,204
Pepin	432	62.88%	255	37.12%	0	0.00%	177	25.76%	687
Pierce	506	62.39%	305	37.61%	0	0.00%	201	24.78%	811
Polk	161	52.44%	141	45.93%	5	1.63%	20	6.51%	307
Portage	743	56.08%	582	43.92%	0	0.00%	161	12.15%	1,325
Racine	2,111	56.32%	1,634	43.60%	3	0.08%	477	12.73%	3,748
Richland	745	53.52%	647	46.48%	0	0.00%	98	7.04%	1,392
Rock	4,089	72.09%	1,578	27.82%	5	0.09%	2,511	44.27%	5,672
Sauk	1,659	67.49%	799	32.51%	0	0.00%	860	34.99%	2,458
Shawano	105	54.69%	87	45.31%	0	0.00%	18	9.38%	192
Sheboygan	1,772	48.67%	1,839	50.51%	30	0.82%	-67	-1.84%	3,641
St. Croix	516	47.96%	560	52.04%	0	0.00%	-44	-4.09%	1,076
Trempealeau	366	71.91%	143	28.09%	0	0.00%	223	43.81%	509
Walworth	3,133	68.23%	1,459	31.77%	0	0.00%	1,674	36.45%	4,592
Washington	684	24.50%	2,106	75.43%	2	0.07%	-1,422	-50.93%	2,792
Waukesha	2,785	54.80%	2,295	45.16%	2	0.04%	490	9.64%	5,082
Waupaca	1,167	65.16%	624	34.84%	0	0.00%	543	30.32%	1,791
Waushara	1,126	74.77%	380	25.23%	0	0.00%	746	49.54%	1,506
Winnebago	2,235	58.74%	1,570	41.26%	0	0.00%	665	17.48%	3,805
Wood	235	45.63%	280	54.37%	0	0.00%	-45	-8.74%	515
Total	59,999	53.21%	52,539	46.60%	217	0.19%	7,460	6.62%	112,755

==== Counties that flipped from Democratic to Republican ====
- Iowa
- Juneau
- La Crosse
- Polk
- Richland
- Shawano

==== Counties that flipped from Republican to Democratic ====
- Door
- Jefferson
- Marquette
- Sheboygan
- Wood
