= Gilbert M. Woodward =

American politician (1835–1914)

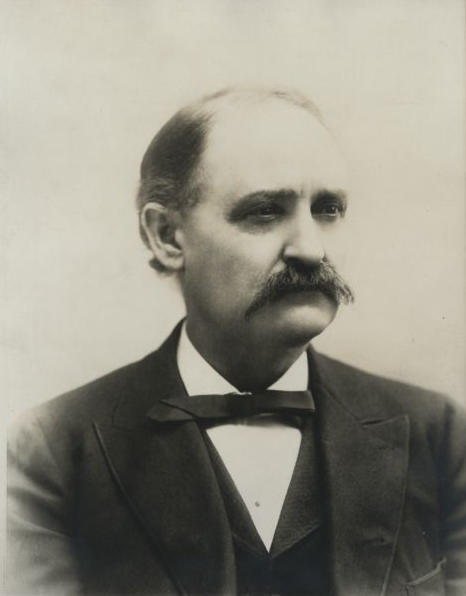
- Photo from the Wisconsin Historical Society

Member of the U.S. House of Representatives from Wisconsin's 7th district
- In office March 4, 1883 – March 3, 1885
- Preceded by: Herman L. Humphrey
- Succeeded by: Ormsby B. Thomas

16th Mayor of La Crosse, Wisconsin
- In office April 1874 – April 1875
- Preceded by: Gysbert Van Steenwyk Sr.
- Succeeded by: James J. Hogan

District Attorney of La Crosse County, Wisconsin
- In office January 1, 1866 – January 5, 1874
- Preceded by: E. H. McMillan
- Succeeded by: Benjamin F. Bryant

Personal details
- Born: December 25, 1835 Washington, D.C., U.S.
- Died: March 13, 1914 (aged 78) La Crosse, Wisconsin, U.S.
- Resting place: Oak Grove Cemetery, La Crosse, Wisconsin
- Party: Democratic; Liberal Rep. (1870s)
- Spouse: Ella R. Parker (m. 1864; died 1869)
- Children: none
- Relatives: William Creighton Woodward (nephew)

Military service
- Allegiance: United States
- Branch/service: United States Volunteers; Union Army
- Years of service: 1861–1864
- Rank: 1st Lieutenant, USV
- Unit: 2nd Reg. Wis. Vol. Infantry
- Battles/wars: American Civil War: First Battle of Bull Run; Second Battle of Bull Run; Maryland Campaign; Battle of South Mountain; Battle of Antietam; Battle of Fredericksburg; Battle of Chancellorsville; Gettysburg campaign; Battle of Gettysburg; Overland Campaign

Gilbert Motier Woodward (December 25, 1835 – March 13, 1914) was an American lawyer and politician. He served one term in the United States House of Representatives, representing Wisconsin's 7th congressional district. He was also the 16th mayor of La Crosse, Wisconsin, and the Democratic nominee for Governor of Wisconsin in 1886. During the American Civil War he served as a Union Army officer in the famed Iron Brigade of the Army of the Potomac.

== Early life ==
Woodward was born December 25, 1835, in Washington, D.C., and was educated in the common schools. He learned the printing trade working as an apprentice in Baltimore, and worked as a printer and proofreader in Baltimore, Upper Marlboro, and Washington, until 1860. In Washington, he spent most of his time working for the historic National Intelligencer newspaper.

In February 1860 he moved west to Wisconsin and settled at La Crosse. He studied law in the office of Isaac E. Messmore and was admitted to the bar in 1861. Due to the outbreak of the American Civil War, Woodward postponed his plans to start a legal practice and instead enlisted for service in the Union Army.

== Civil War service ==
Woodward joined a company of volunteers known as the "La Crosse Light Guards", which was organized into Company B of the 2nd Wisconsin Infantry Regiment at Camp Randall. The 2nd Wisconsin Infantry mustered into federal service in June 1861 and proceeded to Washington, D.C., for service in the eastern theater of the war.

He was promoted to first sergeant in September 1861, after the First Battle of Bull Run. That Fall, the regiment was organized into a brigade with the 6th Wisconsin, 7th Wisconsin, and 19th Indiana infantry regiments. The brigade would shortly become famous as the Iron Brigade of the Army of the Potomac due to their performance in the Battle of Gainesville in August 1862. Just days before that battle, Woodward was commissioned as second lieutenant of his company.

In the next month, their captain was killed at the Battle of South Mountain and Woodward was promoted to first lieutenant. With his regiment, he went on to participate in the Battle of Antietam in September, then the Battle of Fredericksburg in December 1862 and the Battle of Chancellorsville in the Spring of 1863. Following Chancellorsville, Woodward was appointed adjutant of the regiment, serving Colonel Lucius Fairchild, but was then quickly detailed as an adjutant to the brigade commander, General Solomon Meredith. He was serving on Meredith's staff during the Battle of Gettysburg and was shot in the forearm. After a brief recuperation, he resumed his service as an aide to General Lysander Cutler in the Overland Campaign of 1864 until the expiration of his enlistment on July 2, 1864.

== Legal and political career ==
After the war Woodward became active in the legal community in La Crosse and was elected district attorney of La Crosse County in 1865. He was subsequently re-elected three times, serving until January 1874. While serving as district attorney, he formed a law partnership with Samuel S. Burton in 1868, which continued until 1876.

He also became active in state politics. He ran for Wisconsin State Senate in 1872 as a Liberal Republican on the Reform coalition ticket, but was defeated by Republican Gideon Hixon. In the Spring election of 1874, he was narrowly elected mayor of La Crosse, defeating a Republican-Temperance unity ticket led by Sylvester Nevins. He was subsequently elected city attorney and served from 1876 through 1882.

Woodward ran for United States House of Representatives in 1882 and received the Democratic nomination on the first ballot of their convention. The 7th congressional district was a safe Republican seat through the 1870s, but the redistricting of 1882 moved three-term incumbent Herman L. Humphrey into a different congressional district. Woodward won the general election in an upset with 48% of the vote, as the Prohibition Party candidate took 7%. He served in the Forty-eighth Congress (March 4, 1883 – March 3, 1885), but lost his run for re-election in 1884.

After leaving office he resumed his law practice in La Crosse, but remained active in the Democratic Party. At the 1886 Democratic State Convention, former congressman and Union Army colonel Gabriel Bouck was largely expected to accept the party's nomination for Governor of Wisconsin, but unexpectedly sent a letter declining the nomination at the start of the convention. Charles Jonas of Racine was considered a strong candidate for the nomination, but was damaged by an aggressive pressure campaign driven by Labor and Socialist activists from Milwaukee. Woodward's name was ultimately proposed to the convention by congressman and power-broker Edward S. Bragg, who had served with Woodward in the Iron Brigade. Woodward was warmly received by the convention and nominated by acclamation.

Woodward was defeated in the general election as Republican Jeremiah McLain Rusk won his third term as governor. Woodward's last significant political activity was serving as chairman of the Wisconsin delegation to the 1888 Democratic National Convention.

The next year he formed a law partnership with J. W. Losey, known as Losey & Woodward, and devoted most of the remainder of his life to his legal career. He was known as a frequent litigant in front of the Wisconsin Supreme Court.

== Personal life and family ==
Woodward married Ella R. Parker in 1864, but she died just a few years later, in 1868. They had no children and Woodward never remarried.

Woodward died at the home of D. A. MacDonald on March 13, 1914. Though his health had been declining for years, he worked until three months before his death. He was buried at Oak Grove Cemetery in La Crosse.

== Electoral history ==
=== Wisconsin Senate (1872) ===
Wisconsin Senate, 31st District Election, 1872
Party	Candidate	Votes	%	±%
General Election, November 5, 1872
Republican	Gideon Hixon	2,213	53.13%	−19.26%
Liberal Republican	Gilbert M. Woodward	1,952	46.87%	
Plurality		261	6.27%	-38.53%
Total votes		4,165	100.0%	+8.15%
Republican hold				

=== U.S. House of Representatives (1882, 1884) ===
Wisconsin's 7th Congressional District Election, 1882
Party	Candidate	Votes	%	±%
General Election, November 7, 1882
Democratic	Gilbert M. Woodward	11,908	48.09%	+17.43%
Republican	Cyrus M. Butt	10,604	46.87%	−21.82%
Prohibition	B. F. Parker	1,887	7.62%	
Greenback	Reuben May	360	1.45%	−3.22%
	Scattering	4	0.02%	
Plurality		1,304	5.27%	-28.72%
Total votes		24,763	100.0%	-30.94%
Democratic gain from Republican				

Wisconsin's 7th Congressional District Election, 1884
Party	Candidate	Votes	%	±%
General Election, November 4, 1884
Republican	Ormsby B. Thomas	18,437	52.62%	+9.80%
Democratic	Gilbert M. Woodward (incumbent)	15,446	44.09%	−4.00%
Prohibition	S. B. Loomis	1,147	3.27%	
	Scattering	5	0.01%	
Plurality		2,991	8.54%	+3.27%
Total votes		35,035	100.0%	+41.48%
Republican gain from Democratic				

=== Wisconsin Governor (1886) ===
Wisconsin Gubernatorial Election, 1886
Party	Candidate	Votes	%	±%
General Election, November 2, 1886
Republican	Jeremiah McLain Rusk (incumbent)	133,247	46.53%	−4.47%
Democratic	Gilbert M. Woodward	114,529	39.99%	−4.99%
Populist	John Cochrane	21,467	7.50%	
Prohibition	John Myers Olin	17,089	5.97%	+3.30%
	Scattering	36	0.01%	
Plurality		18,718	6.54%	+0.51%
Total votes		286,368	100.0%	-10.51%
Republican hold				

Party political offices
Preceded by Nicholas D. Fratt	Democratic nominee for Governor of Wisconsin; 1886	Succeeded by James Morgan
U.S. House of Representatives
Preceded by Herman L. Humphrey	Member of the U.S. House of Representatives from Wisconsin's 7th congressional district 1883 – 1885	Succeeded by Ormsby B. Thomas
Political offices
Preceded by Gysbert Van Steenwyk Sr.	Mayor of La Crosse, Wisconsin; April 1874 – April 1875	Succeeded by James J. Hogan
Legal offices
Preceded by E. H. McMillan	District Attorney of La Crosse County, Wisconsin; January 1, 1866 – January 5, 1874	Succeeded by Benjamin F. Bryant
