= David Franklin Powell =

American physician

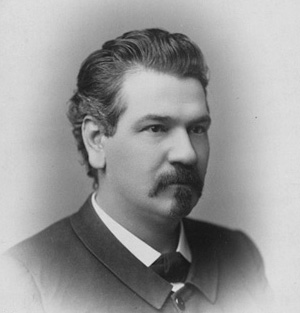
David Franklin Powell

David Franklin Powell, also known as D. Frank Powell and White Beaver (May 25, 1847 – May 7, 1906) was a pharmacist, physician, field surgeon, maker of patent medicines and sometime politician, associated with Buffalo Bill Cody. He served three terms as mayor of La Crosse, Wisconsin, and was twice a candidate for Governor of Wisconsin. He both wrote and appeared as a character in dime novels.

== Background ==
In the words of one 19th-century chronicler, "The life of White Beaver, as Dr. Powell is popularly known, bears all the lights and shades of a frontier romance," and much of what was reported about his early life may be regarded with a certain degree of skepticism.

He was born May 25, 1847, in Kentucky, son of Dr. C. H. Powell, a Kentuckian physician of Highland Scotch descent, and a mother whose first name is unknown. She was said to be the daughter of a medicine chief of the Seneca people (of the Beaver clan) and a woman from the Tompkins family of Tompkins County, New York. Her Seneca grandfather was a soldier in the American Revolution, dying from war wounds in 1779. His parents met when his mother was with her father on a hunting excursion near Seneca Lake. The two settled in Kentucky on the Kentucky River. His father was a polyglot, and his mother a self-trained botanist with a deep expertise in the use of medicinal plants. Young Powell was homeschooled in his parents' log cabin.

=== After the death of his father ===
Powell's father died in 1855, and his mother returned with her three children to New York, settling about thirty miles from Ithaca, where attempts at farming were not successful. They then moved to Chicago, where Powell worked for two years as a clerk in a drug store, then on to Omaha, where Powell became a clerk at the large drug store of Dr. James K. Ish, with whom he rose to become a partner. The firm of Ish & Powell developed a large business, supplying over-the-counter medicines throughout the Territories.

Meanwhile, his mother and two brothers had acquired a large tract on the Platte River, near Lone Tree, Nebraska, where they built a ranch. Powell usually spent two months a year on this ranch, and it was there that he made the acquaintance of "Buffalo Bill" Cody, Wild Bill Hickok, California Joe Milner, Texas Jack Omohundro and other colorful figures. All three Powell brothers spent some of this period as civilian scouts for the U. S. Army.

=== Medical school ===
In late 1869, Powell (who had never received classroom education at any level) took a competitive examination for a scholarship for Nebraskans to attend the University of Louisville, and defeated thirteen other candidates. He spent two years in the University of Louisville Medical Department, working as a janitor to pay his expenses, and received his M.D. He served as class valedictorian, despite having gotten into a non-fatal duel with one of his professors, and was offered a faculty post. He declined, and became a post surgeon for the Army's Department of the Platte at Fort McPherson.

== Dime novels and dime novelist ==
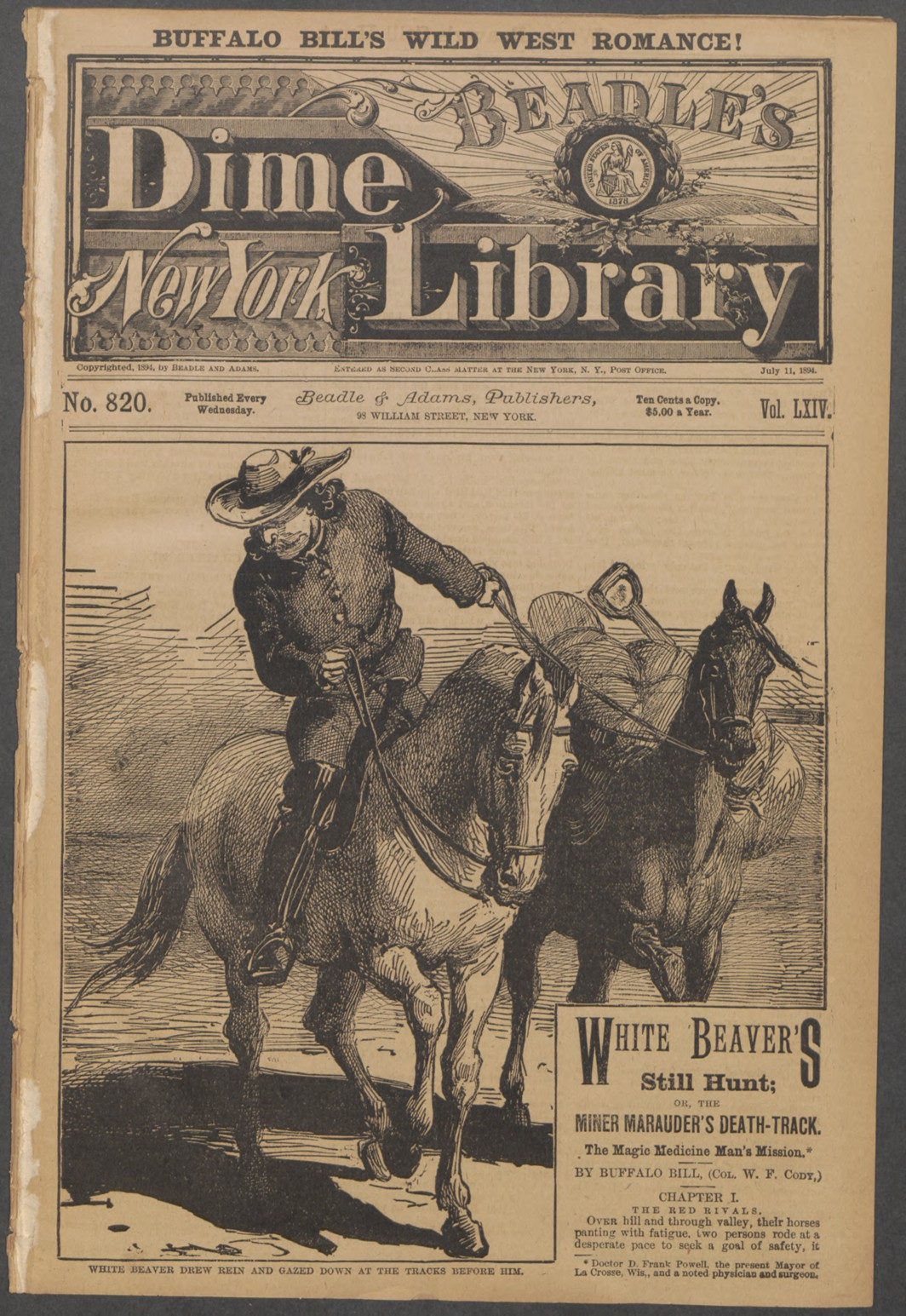
Cover of a dime novel depicting physician/politician David Franklin Powell

At least ten dime novels featuring Powell are known to have been published with Powell's name or nickname(s) in the title (he may have appeared in others as a secondary character), both full-length works and short stories. These include:

- Prairie Pards; or, Tales of Border Trails: White Beaver's Death-Trail (1881)
- White Beaver, the Exile of the Platte; or, A Wronged Man's Red Trail. A Romance founded upon Incidents in the Border Life of Frank Powell, the "Doctor Scout," Late Surgeon in the United States Army, and now the "Mighty Medicine Chief of the Winnebagoes." (1884)
  - White Beaver's Home - biographical note about Powell in the same issue as the first part of the above (1884)
- White Beaver's One-Arm Pard; or, Red Retribution in Borderland. The Concluding Story of the White Beaver Series (1884)
- Fancy Frank's Drop; or, White Beaver, the Indian Medicine Chief. The Romantic and Adventurous Life of Dr. Frank Powell, known on the Border as "Fancy Frank," "Iron Face," etc., etc., etc. (1882)
- The Wizard Brothers; or, White Beaver's Red Trail (1884) - features not only Frank Powell (here nicknamed "Surgeon Scout"), but his brothers, dubbed "Night Hawk" and "Bronco Bill"
- The King of the Mines; or, The Invincible Two. A Companion Story to "Buffalo Bill's Bonanza," and a Romance in the Career of the Life Long Pards--Hon. W. F. Cody--"Buffalo Bill," and Dr. Frank Powell--"White Beaver" (1886)
  - The Buffalo Bill's Swoop; or, The King of the Mines. A Companion Story to "Buffalo Bill's Bonanza," and a Romance in the Career of the Life Long Pards--Hon. W. F. Cody--"Buffalo Bill," and Dr. Frank Powell--"White Beaver" (1886) - same as above, different title
- Powell's Pard; or, The One-Armed Giant. A Story Founded on Incidents in the Romantic Life of Dr. Frank Powell (White Beaver), White Medicine Chief of the Winnebagos (1887)
- White Beaver's Romance (1888)
- Gentleman Jack, the Man of Many Masks; or, Buffalo Bill's Peerless Pard. A Romance of Tangled Trails followed by Buffalo Bill and his Buckskin Heroes, Surgeon Frank Powell, Wild Bill, Texas Jack, Captain Jack Crawford, Buckskin Sam, Colorado Carl and a Mysterious Unknown (1890)
- White Beaver's Still Hunt; or, The Miner Marauder's Death-Track. The Magic Medicine Man's Mission (1894)

Between 1881 and 1887, Powell is known to have published at least three dime novels of his own, often featuring his old friends like Buffalo Bill. Powell is himself described on the covers of these volumes:

- The Doomed Dozen; or, Dolores, the Danite's Daughter. A Romance of Border Trails and Mormon Mysteries (1881) "By Dr. Frank Powell, 'White Beaver', the Medicine Chief of the Winnebago Indians"
- Old Grizzly Adams, the Bear Tamer; or, "The Monarch of the Mountains." Thrilling Adventures in the Life of the Famous "Wild Hermit of the Rockies," and "Grizzly Bear Tamer," as he was known from Montana to Mexico, and Whose Deeds of Daring, as Indian Trailer, Savage Beast Conqueror, and Mountain Regulator, would Fill Volumes (1882; twice reprinted) "By Dr. Frank Powell, Known on the Border as 'White Beaver', 'Fancy Frank' and 'Medicine Chief of the Winnebagoes'"
- The Dragoon Detective; or, A Man of Destiny. A Romance of the Road Raiders of the Rockies (1887) "By Dr. Frank Powell. -- 'White Beaver'"
