= Thomas Benton Stoddard =

18th century American politician, 1st Mayor of La Crosse, Wisconsin

Thomas B. Stoddard
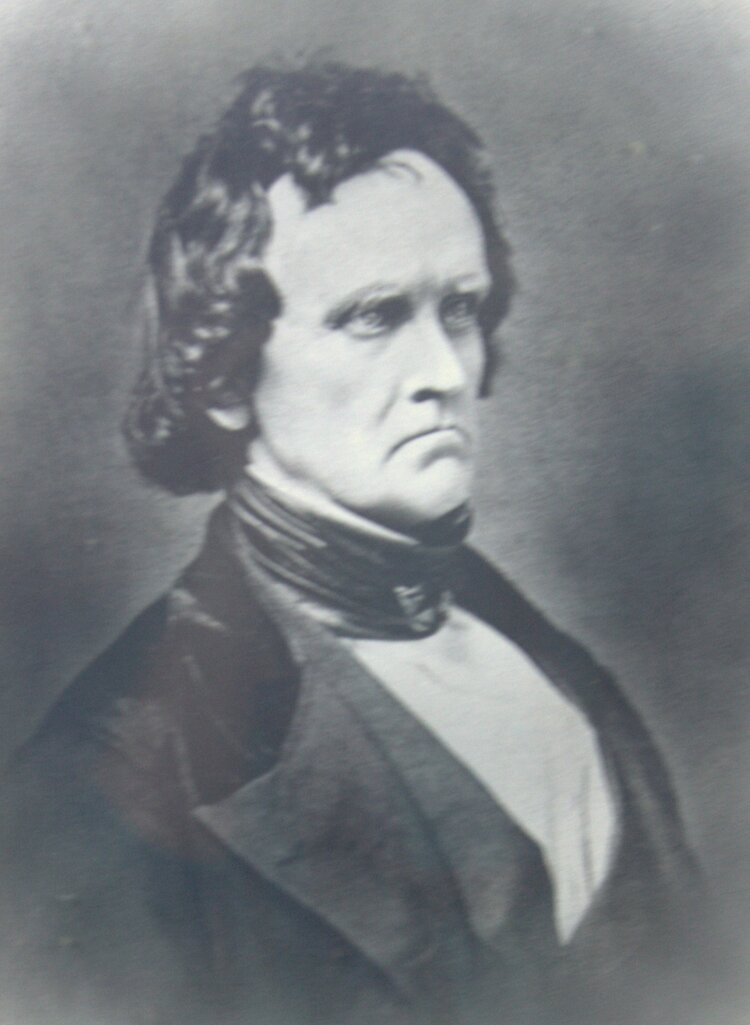

1st Mayor of La Crosse, Wisconsin
- In office April 1856 – April 1857
- Preceded by: Position established
- Succeeded by: Erasmus D. Campbell

Member of the Wisconsin State Assembly from the La Crosse district
- In office January 1, 1862 – January 1, 1863
- Preceded by: Isaac E. Messmore (La Crosse and Monroe)
- Succeeded by: Enos M. Philips

Personal details
- Born: Thomas Benton Stoddard; December 11, 1800 Canandaigua, New York, U.S.
- Died: February 24, 1876 (aged 75) La Crosse, Wisconsin, US.
- Resting place: Oak Grove Cemetery; La Crosse, Wisconsin
- Party: Republican
- Education: Columbia University; Yale University

Thomas Benton Stoddard (December 11, 1800 – February 24, 1876) was an American lawyer and politician who served as the first mayor of La Crosse, Wisconsin.

== Early life and education ==
Born in Canandaigua, New York, Stoddard graduated from Columbia University and Yale University. He studied law under Aaron Burr.

== Career ==
In 1851, Stoddard moved to La Crosse, Wisconsin, and he was elected the first mayor of the city in 1856. In 1862, he served in the Wisconsin State Assembly.

The village of Stoddard, Wisconsin was named after Stoddard.
