= David Vaughan (Wisconsin politician) =

American politician

David Vaughan (February 3, 1822 – February 28, 1890) was an American farmer, mechanic, and politician.

Born in North Wales, Vaughan emigrated with his parents to the United States in 1831 and settled in Remsen, New York. Vaughan went to public school in Remsen, New York. In 1864, he moved to the town of Burns, La Crosse County, Wisconsin. He was a farmer and mechanic. Vaughan served as justice of the peace for the town of Burns. Vaughan served in the Wisconsin State Assembly in 1887 and was a Republican. Vaughan died at his home in the town of Burns, Wisconsin.
