= John Crawford (Wisconsin politician) =

American politician

John Crawford (December 4, 1792 – March 8, 1881) was an American pioneer and politician.

Crawford was born in Worcester, Massachusetts to William Crawford and Mary Sampson. When his mother died in 1810, his father and family moved to Chester, Vermont. Crawford himself moved to St. Lawrence County, New York, where he worked for local farmers. Soon after he worked rafting spars in Quebec.

At the outbreak of the War of 1812, Crawford went to Waddington, New York to join the New York militia. He married Mary Ann Kittenhouse in 1814. In 1834, President Andrew Jackson appointed him inspector of revenue for the Oswegatchie district, headquartered in Waddington.

Crawford journeyed west in 1836, first moving to Michigan City, Indiana. While there, he purchased a steamer named Detroit on behalf of a steamship company. He then ran the steamer on trips between Milwaukee, Racine, Kenosha, Chicago, and Michigan City. When the Detroit wrecked off the coast of Kenosha, Byron Kilbourn hired Crawford to run a steamer in the Milwaukee harbor, the Badger. Soon after, Crawford settled in the town of Wauwatosa.

Once settled in Milwaukee County, Crawford became involved in local civic life. He took the 1840 census in Wauwatosa, and was elected county coroner in 1841. Crawford was elected to the territorial legislature in 1845 and represented Milwaukee County at the 1846 Wisconsin Constitutional Convention. He was elected to the Wisconsin State Assembly in 1854. In 1866 he was a Milwaukee County supervisor. Towards the end of his life, he was given the honor of placing the cornerstone of the new Milwaukee County Courthouse, at present-day Cathedral Square Park, in 1873. He died in 1881.
