= 1857 Wisconsin gubernatorial election =

- November 3, 1857
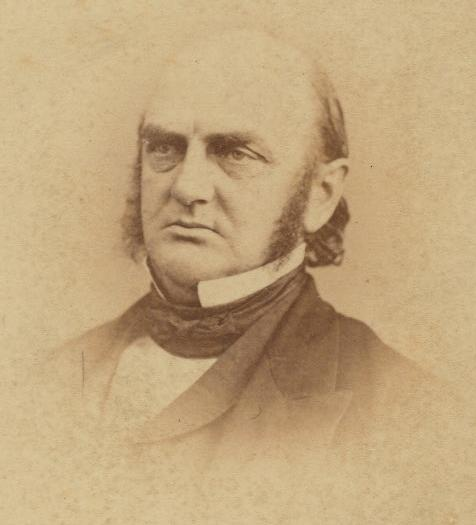

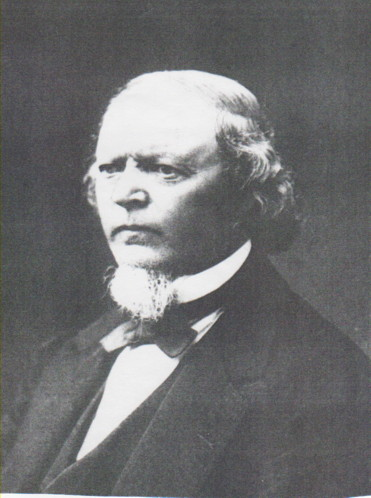
Nominee	Alexander W. Randall	James B. Cross
Party	Republican	Democratic
Popular vote	45,059	44,941
Percentage	50.03%	49.90%
- County results Randall: 50–60% 60–70% 70–80% Cross: 50–60% 60–70% 70–80% 80–90%
Governor before election
Coles Bashford
Republican
Elected Governor
Alexander W. Randall
Republican

The 1857 Wisconsin gubernatorial election was held on November 3, 1857. After incumbent Governor Coles Bashford declined to seek re-election, Republican Party candidate Alexander Randall narrowly defeated Democratic candidate James B. Cross by a margin of just 118 votes.

Richland County would not vote for a Democrat again until 1924, nor would Polk County until 1918 and Juneau County until 1892. Conversely, Marquette County would not vote for a Republican again until 1886.

== Nominations ==
=== Republican party ===
Alexander W. Randall was a Wisconsin circuit court judge in Milwaukee prior to the 1857 gubernatorial election, having been appointed by the previous Governor, Coles Bashford. Randall had been an attorney for Governor Bashford in his challenge of the 1855 Wisconsin gubernatorial election results. Earlier, in 1846, Randall had been a delegate to the first Wisconsin constitutional convention and had successfully advocated for including a provision by which African American suffrage could be legalized via referendum. Randall served as a Democrat in the Wisconsin State Assembly in 1855, but became a Republican later that year when he ran unsuccessfully for election to be Attorney General of Wisconsin.

Randall became a compromise choice for gubernatorial nominee at the 1857 Wisconsin Republican Convention after delegates became deadlocked between the two leading candidates, Edward Holton and Walter McIndoe.

==== Other candidates ====
- Edward D. Holton, of Milwaukee, had previously been a candidate for Governor in the 1853 election, running as an independent. Holton was a strident abolitionist and was well-connected to the Milwaukee elite as a businessman and banker.
- Walter D. McIndoe, of Wausau, had served three terms in the Wisconsin State Assembly representing the frontier northern counties of the state. McIndoe was a Scottish immigrant and worked in the lumber industry.

=== Democratic party ===
James B. Cross was the incumbent Mayor of Milwaukee at the time of the 1857 gubernatorial election, serving his third consecutive term in that role. He had also represented Milwaukee in the Wisconsin State Assembly for three terms. Cross was a lawyer and had previously served as a probate judge in Milwaukee County. He was a Wisconsin delegate to the 1856 Democratic National Convention.

James B. Cross was nominated on the third ballot at the Wisconsin Democratic Party Convention. He received 89 votes; Jairus C. Fairchild received 37; Francis Huebschmann received 14.

==== Other candidates ====
- Jairus C. Fairchild, of Madison, had been the first State Treasurer of Wisconsin. He was also the first mayor of Madison after its incorporation as a city in 1856.
- Francis Huebschmann, of Milwaukee, was a physician and German American immigrant. He had served in the Wisconsin State Senate in the 1851 and 1852 sessions of the legislature, and was a member of the Milwaukee City Council and County Board.

== Results ==
1857 Wisconsin gubernatorial election (Note: There are two certificates from the Board of State Canvassers for the 1857 election. The second one includes additional votes from Adams County and Dodge County. These additional votes did not affect the final outcome, although the final result is significantly closer in the latter canvass and Cross wins Dodge County instead of Randall. The figures below are from the second canvass, including the additional votes.)
Party	Candidate	Votes	%	±%
Republican	Alexander Randall	45,059	50.03%	+0.17%
Democratic	James B. Cross	44,941	49.90%	−0.17%
	Scattering	58	0.06%	
Majority		118	0.13%	
Total votes		90,058	100.00%	
Republican hold		Swing	+0.35%	

=== Results by county ===
County	Alexander Randall Republican		James B. Cross Democratic		Scattering Write-in		Margin		Total votes cast
County	#	%	#	%	#	%	#	%	Total votes cast
Adams	397	60.33%	261	39.67%	0	0.00%	136	20.67%	658
Bad Ax	549	55.23%	445	44.77%	0	0.00%	104	10.46%	994
Brown	143	19.92%	575	80.08%	0	0.00%	-432	-60.17%	718
Buffalo	179	33.09%	362	66.91%	0	0.00%	-183	-33.83%	541
Calumet	361	42.52%	488	57.48%	0	0.00%	-127	-14.96%	849
Chippewa	70	21.47%	256	78.53%	0	0.00%	-186	-57.06%	326
Clark	59	60.20%	39	39.80%	0	0.00%	20	20.41%	98
Columbia	1,731	57.47%	1,280	42.50%	1	0.03%	451	14.97%	3,012
Crawford	278	43.17%	366	56.83%	0	0.00%	-88	-13.66%	644
Dane	2,668	47.30%	2,959	52.46%	14	0.25%	-291	-5.16%	5,641
Dodge	2,647	48.43%	2,819	51.57%	0	0.00%	-172	-3.15%	5,466
Door	39	50.65%	38	49.35%	0	0.00%	1	1.30%	77
Douglas	28	16.18%	145	83.82%	0	0.00%	-117	-67.63%	173
Dunn	204	64.76%	111	35.24%	0	0.00%	93	29.52%	315
Eau Claire	199	59.94%	133	40.06%	0	0.00%	66	19.88%	332
Fond du Lac	2,097	53.44%	1,826	46.53%	1	0.03%	271	6.91%	3,924
Grant	1,681	57.16%	1,260	42.84%	0	0.00%	421	14.31%	2,941
Green	1,156	58.15%	832	41.85%	0	0.00%	324	16.30%	1,988
Iowa	765	45.54%	915	54.46%	0	0.00%	-150	-8.93%	1,680
Jackson	336	50.91%	324	49.09%	0	0.00%	12	1.82%	660
Jefferson	1,804	51.32%	1,711	48.68%	0	0.00%	93	2.65%	3,515
Juneau	499	49.70%	505	50.30%	0	0.00%	-6	-0.60%	1,004
Kenosha	932	57.35%	693	42.65%	0	0.00%	239	14.71%	1,625
Kewaunee	51	22.27%	178	77.73%	0	0.00%	-127	-55.46%	229
La Crosse	684	44.19%	861	55.62%	3	0.19%	-177	-11.43%	1,548
La Pointe	0	0.00%	43	100.00%	0	0.00%	-43	-100.00%	43
Lafayette	758	35.79%	1,360	64.21%	0	0.00%	-602	-28.42%	2,118
Manitowoc	631	33.67%	1,241	66.22%	2	0.11%	-610	-32.55%	1,874
Marathon	197	48.52%	209	51.48%	0	0.00%	-12	-2.96%	406
Marquette	1,475	55.10%	1,202	44.90%	0	0.00%	273	10.20%	2,677
Milwaukee	2,248	28.81%	5,531	70.89%	23	0.29%	-3,283	-42.08%	7,802
Monroe	555	56.12%	434	43.88%	0	0.00%	121	12.23%	989
Oconto	160	46.24%	186	53.76%	0	0.00%	-26	-7.51%	346
Outagamie	416	42.06%	573	57.94%	0	0.00%	-157	-15.87%	989
Ozaukee	266	18.56%	1,167	81.44%	0	0.00%	-901	-62.88%	1,433
Pierce	306	64.15%	171	35.85%	0	0.00%	135	28.30%	477
Polk	111	41.89%	154	58.11%	0	0.00%	-43	-16.23%	265
Portage	571	53.62%	494	46.38%	0	0.00%	77	7.23%	1,065
Racine	1,752	54.68%	1,452	45.32%	0	0.00%	300	9.36%	3,204
Richland	538	46.95%	608	53.05%	0	0.00%	-70	-6.11%	1,146
Rock	3,425	67.71%	1,633	32.29%	0	0.00%	1,792	35.43%	5,058
Sauk	1,239	59.74%	835	40.26%	0	0.00%	404	19.48%	2,074
Shawano	15	20.27%	59	79.73%	0	0.00%	-44	-59.46%	74
Sheboygan	1,276	54.91%	1,047	45.05%	1	0.04%	229	9.85%	2,324
St. Croix	358	47.99%	388	52.01%	0	0.00%	-30	-4.02%	746
Trempealeau	164	75.23%	54	24.77%	0	0.00%	110	50.46%	218
Walworth	2,335	68.16%	1,089	31.79%	2	0.06%	1,246	36.38%	3,426
Washington	341	19.10%	1,433	80.28%	11	0.62%	-1,092	-61.18%	1,785
Waukesha	2,269	54.83%	1,869	45.17%	0	0.00%	400	9.67%	4,138
Waupaca	936	65.27%	498	34.73%	0	0.00%	438	30.54%	1,434
Waushara	978	77.25%	288	22.75%	0	0.00%	690	54.50%	1,266
Winnebago	2,058	59.00%	1,430	41.00%	0	0.00%	628	18.00%	3,488
Wood	124	52.77%	111	47.23%	0	0.00%	13	5.53%	235
Total	45,059	50.03%	44,941	49.90%	58	0.06%	118	0.13%	90,058

==== Counties that flipped from Democratic to Republican ====
- Clark
- Dunn
- Racine
- Sheboygan
- Waupaca

==== Counties that flipped from Republican to Democratic ====
- Dane
- Outagamie
- Richland
- Shawano
