= Alexander Randall (Wisconsin politician) =

American politician

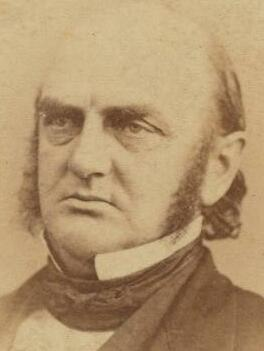

22nd United States Postmaster General
- In office July 25, 1866 – March 4, 1869
- President: Andrew Johnson
- Preceded by: William Dennison, Jr.
- Succeeded by: John Creswell

3rd United States Minister to the Papal States
- In office June 6, 1862 – August 4, 1862
- President: Abraham Lincoln
- Preceded by: John P. Stockton
- Succeeded by: Richard Blatchford

6th Governor of Wisconsin
- In office January 4, 1858 – January 6, 1862
- Lieutenant: Erasmus D. Campbell; Butler Noble
- Preceded by: Coles Bashford
- Succeeded by: Louis P. Harvey

Wisconsin Circuit Court Judge for the 2nd Circuit
- In office April 1856 – December 31, 1857
- Appointed by: Coles Bashford
- Preceded by: Levi N. Hubbell
- Succeeded by: Arthur MacArthur, Sr.

Member of the Wisconsin State Assembly from the Waukesha 4th district
- In office January 10, 1855 – January 9, 1856
- Preceded by: Jesse Smith
- Succeeded by: Charles S. Hawley

Personal details
- Born: Alexander Williams Randall; October 31, 1819 Ames, New York, U.S.
- Died: July 26, 1872 (aged 52) Elmira, New York, U.S.
- Resting place: Woodlawn Cemetery; Elmira, New York
- Party: Republican (after 1855); Whig (Before 1838, 1849–1855); Free Soil (1848–1849); Democratic (1838–1848)
- Spouse(s): Mary C. Van Vechten (died 1858); Helen M. Thomas (died 1918)
- Children: 1
- Profession: lawyer, politician

Alexander Williams Randall (October 31, 1819 – July 26, 1872) was an American lawyer, judge, and Republican politician from Waukesha, Wisconsin. He served as the 22nd U.S. postmaster general, during the administration of President Andrew Johnson (1865–1869). He previously served as the sixth governor of Wisconsin (1858–1862) and, as governor, was instrumental in raising and organizing the first Wisconsin volunteer troops for the Union Army during the American Civil War. He is the namesake of Camp Randall and Camp Randall Stadium.

== Life and career ==
Randall was born in Ames, New York, on October 31, 1819. His father, Phineas, was judge of the court of common pleas there from 1837 to 1841. Randall attended Cherry Valley Academy in New York then studied law with his father. He was admitted to the bar in New York at age 19. Shortly after that, he moved to Wisconsin Territory. He opened a law practice in Waukesha in 1840, where he became postmaster in 1845.

Randall was a delegate to the state's first constitutional convention in 1846. There he successfully advocated for a resolution that would put the question of "Negro suffrage" to a statewide referendum. He was elected to the Wisconsin State Assembly for the 1855 session and was the Republican Party's first candidate for Attorney General of Wisconsin, running unsuccessfully in the 1855 election. From 1855 to 1857, he was a circuit judge in Milwaukee.

Randall was elected governor in 1857 as a Republican, and won re-election in 1859. He was a dark horse candidate in 1857. The two principal candidates in the convention that year were Edward D. Holton of Milwaukee and Walter McIndoe of Wausau. Holton's abolitionist passions and his connections with the Milwaukee elite gave him strong support, but McIndoe's more rough-hewn personality resonated better with the frontier character of the state at the time. As such, they split the vote, neither able to garner a majority for the nomination. When it became apparent that the convention was at an impasse, and the delegates were released from their obligation, the votes eventually were cast in favor of Randall, the obvious compromise candidate.

Prior to the beginning of the Civil War, he was an ardent abolitionist and proposed that Wisconsin secede from the Union if Abraham Lincoln did not win the presidency.

As governor, Randall conducted an investigation of fraud in the distribution of federal railroad land grants in Wisconsin perpetrated by his predecessor, Republican Governor Coles Bashford.

== Civil War ==
Once war began Randall raised 18 regiments, 10 artillery batteries, and three cavalry units before leaving office, exceeding Wisconsin's quota by 3,232 men. The Union Army created a military camp from the former state fairgrounds in Madison, Wisconsin, and named it "Camp Randall" after the governor. Camp Randall Stadium is now located on the site of the military camp.

In 1861, President Abraham Lincoln appointed Randall U.S. Minister to the Papal States. He was succeeded by Richard Milford Blatchford, and, in 1863, accepted appointment as Assistant Postmaster General. President Andrew Johnson appointed him United States Postmaster General in 1866 and he remained in that position until 1869. When Johnson was impeached, Randall remained loyal, testifying on Johnson's behalf and contributing to his defense fund.

After leaving the federal government, Randall moved to Elmira, New York, where he resumed practicing law. He died there July 26, 1872. He is buried in Woodlawn Cemetery.

== Electoral history ==
=== Wisconsin Attorney General ===
1855 Wisconsin Attorney General election,
Party	Candidate	Votes	%	±%
General Election, November 6, 1855
Democratic	William R. Smith	37,312	51.22%	−5.81%
Republican	Alexander Randall	35,533	48.78%	
Plurality		1,779	2.44%	-12.00%
Total votes		72,845	100.0%	+31.03%
Democratic hold				

=== Wisconsin Governor ===
1857 Wisconsin gubernatorial election
Party	Candidate	Votes	%	±%
General Election, November 3, 1857
Republican	Alexander Randall	44,693	49.63%	−0.23%
Democratic	James B. Cross	44,239	49.12%	−0.95%
	Scattering	1,126	1.25%	
Total votes		'90,058'	'100.0%'	+24.05%
Republican hold				

1859 Wisconsin gubernatorial election
Party	Candidate	Votes	%	±%
General Election, November 8, 1859
Republican	Alexander Randall (incumbent)	59,999	53.21%	+3.58%
Democratic	Harrison Carroll Hobart	52,539	46.60%	−2.53%
	Scattering	83	0.07%	
Total votes		'112,755'	'100.0%'	+25.20%
Republican hold				

Party political offices
New party	Republican nominee for Attorney General of Wisconsin; 1855	Succeeded by Mortimer M. Jackson
Preceded by Coles Bashford	Republican nominee for Governor of Wisconsin; 1857, 1859	Succeeded by Louis P. Harvey
Political offices
Preceded by Coles Bashford	Governor of Wisconsin; 1858 – 1861	Succeeded by Louis P. Harvey
Preceded by William Dennison	United States Postmaster General; 1866 – 1869	Succeeded by John Creswell
Diplomatic posts
Preceded by John P. Stockton	United States Minister to the Papal States; 1862	Succeeded by Richard Blatchford
