= 20th Wisconsin Legislature =

Wisconsin legislative term for 1867

←	19th	21st	→
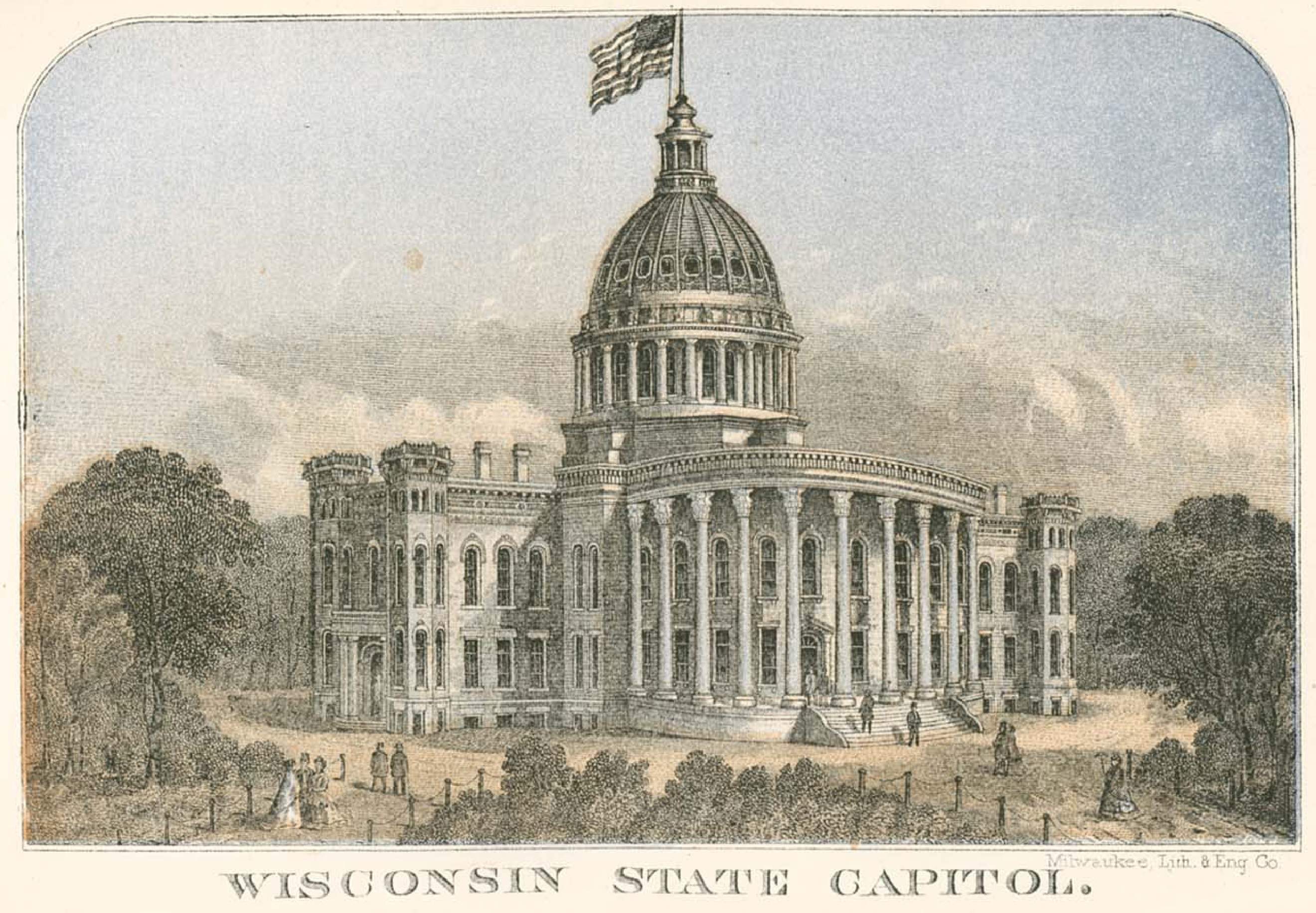
- Wisconsin State Capitol, 1863

Overview
- Legislative body: Wisconsin Legislature
- Meeting place: Wisconsin State Capitol
- Term: January 7, 1867 – January 6, 1868
- Election: November 6, 1866

Senate
- Members: 33
- Senate President: Wyman Spooner (U)
- President pro tempore: George F. Wheeler (U)
- Party control: National Union

Assembly
- Members: 100
- Assembly Speaker: Angus Cameron (U)
- Party control: National Union

Sessions
- 1st: January 9, 1867 – April 11, 1867

The Twentieth Wisconsin Legislature convened from January 9, 1867, to April 11, 1867, in regular session.

This was the first legislative session after the redistricting of the Senate and Assembly according to an act of the previous session.

Senators representing odd-numbered districts were newly elected for this session and were serving the first year of a two-year term. Assembly members were elected to a one-year term. Assembly members and odd-numbered senators were elected in the general election of November 6, 1866. Senators representing even-numbered districts were serving the second year of their two-year term, having been elected in the general election held on November 7, 1865.

The governor of Wisconsin during this entire term was Republican Lucius Fairchild, of Dane County, serving the second year of a two-year term, having won election in the 1865 Wisconsin gubernatorial election.

== Major events ==
- January 23, 1867: Timothy O. Howe re-elected as United States Senator by the Wisconsin Legislature in Joint Session.
- May 29, 1867: The Austro-Hungarian Compromise created the empire of Austria-Hungary.
- June 19, 1867: Emperor Maximilian I of Mexico was executed by firing squad.
- September 30, 1867: The United States took possession of Midway Atoll.
- October 18, 1867: The territory of Alaska was transferred from the Russian Empire to the United States.
- November 5, 1867: Wisconsin general election:
  - Lucius Fairchild re-elected as Governor of Wisconsin.
  - Voters approved an amendment to the Constitution of Wisconsin to raise legislator's compensation to $350 per year.

== Major legislation ==
- February 13, 1867: Wisconsin ratifies the Fourteenth Amendment, 1867 Joint Resolution 4.
- Proposed an amendment to the Constitution of Wisconsin to raise legislators' pay to $350 per year. The amendment was ratified by voters in the November 1867 general election.

== Party summary ==
=== Senate summary ===
Senate partisan composition Democratic: 11 seats National Union: 22 seats

	Party (Shading indicates majority caucus)			Total	
	Democratic	Union	Republican	Total	Vacant
End of previous Legislature	10	23	0	33	0
Start of 1st Session	11	22	0	33	0
From March 3 (Note: Democrat Jackson Hadley (5th district) died March 3, 1867.)	10	22	0	32	1
From March 20 (Note: Democrat Henry L. Palmer (5th district) elected March 20, 1867.)	11	22	0	33	0
From October (Note: Republicans Van Eps Young (1st district) and George Gary (21st district) resigned.)	11	20	0	31	2
Final voting share	33.33%	66.67%			
Beginning of the next Legislature	15	0	18	33	0

=== Assembly summary ===
Assembly partisan composition Democratic: 26 seats National Union: 74 seats

	Party (Shading indicates majority caucus)			Total	
	Democratic	Union	Republican	Total	Vacant
End of previous Legislature	33	67	0	100	0
Start of 1st Session	26	74	0	100	0
Final voting share	26%	74%			
Beginning of the next Legislature	41	0	59	100	0

== Sessions ==
- 1st Regular session: January 9, 1867 – April 11, 1867

== Leaders ==
=== Senate leadership ===
- President of the Senate: Wyman Spooner
- President pro tempore: George F. Wheeler

=== Assembly leadership ===
- Speaker of the Assembly: Angus Cameron

== Members ==
=== Members of the Senate ===
Members of the Wisconsin Senate for the Twentieth Wisconsin Legislature:

Senate partisan representation Democratic: 11 seats Union: 22 seats

Dist.	Counties	Senator	Residence	Party
01	Sheboygan	Van Eps Young	Sheboygan	Union
02	Brown, Door, Kewaunee	Matthew J. Meade	Green Bay	Dem.
03	Ozaukee	Lyman Morgan	Ozaukee	Dem.
04	Washington	Frederick O. Thorpe	West Bend	Dem.
05	Milwaukee (Northern Part)	Jackson Hadley (until Mar. 3)	Milwaukee	Dem.
05	Milwaukee (Northern Part)	Henry L. Palmer (from Mar. 20)	Milwaukee	Dem.
06	Milwaukee (Southern Part)	Charles H. Larkin	Milwaukee	Dem.
07	Racine	Henry Stevens	Caledonia	Union
08	Kenosha	Charles C. Sholes	Kenosha	Union
09	Adams, Juneau, Monroe	DeWitt C. Wilson	Sparta	Union
10	Waukesha	Orson Reed	Summit	Dem.
11	Dane (Eastern Part)	Clement Warner	Windsor	Union
12	Walworth	Newton Littlejohn	Whitewater	Union
13	Lafayette	James H. Earnest	Shullsburg	Dem.
14	Sauk	Argalus Starks	Baraboo	Union
15	Iowa	Joel Whitman	Dodgeville	Union
16	Grant	John H. Rountree	Platteville	Union
17	Rock	Samuel J. Todd	Beloit	Union
18	Dodge (Western Part)	Stoddard Judd	Fox Lake	Union
19	Manitowoc	George B. Reed	Manitowoc	Dem.
20	Fond du Lac	George F. Wheeler	Nanaupa	Union
21	Winnebago	George Gary	Oshkosh	Union
22	Calumet, Oconto, Outagamie, Shawano	Augustus L. Smith	Appleton	Dem.
23	Jefferson	Gerrit T. Thorn	Jefferson	Dem.
24	Green	Henry Adams	Monticello	Union
25	Columbia	Robert B. Sanderson	Poynette	Union
26	Dane (Western Part)	James K. Proudfit	Madison	Union
27	Marathon, Portage, Waupaca, Wood	Edward L. Browne	Waupaca	Union
28	Ashland, Bayfield, Burnett, Dallas, Douglas, Pierce, St. Croix	Marcus A. Fulton	Hudson	Union
29	Green Lake, Marquette, Waushara	Henry G. Webb	Wautoma	Union
30	Crawford, Richland	Benjamin Bull	Prairie du Chien	Union
31	La Crosse, Vernon	Justin W. Ranney	West Salem	Union
32	Buffalo, Chippewa, Clark, Dunn, Eau Claire, Jackson, Pepin, Trempealeau	Joseph G. Thorp	Eau Claire	Union
33	Dodge (Eastern Part)	Satterlee Clark	Horicon	Dem.

=== Members of the Assembly ===
Members of the Assembly for the Twentieth Wisconsin Legislature:

Assembly partisan representation Democratic: 26 seats Union: 74 seats

Senate District	County	District	Representative	Party	Residence
09	Adams		William J. Kershaw	Union	Big Spring
28	Ashland, Bayfield, Burnett, Dallas, Douglas, Polk		Henry D. Barron	Union	St. Croix Falls
02	Brown	1	William J. Abrams	Dem.	Green Bay
02	Brown	2	Randall Wilcox	Dem.	De Pere
32	Buffalo		Conrad Moser Jr.	Union	Alma
22	Calumet		Randolph J. Needham	Union	Stockbridge
32	Chippewa & Dunn		Thaddeus C. Pound	Union	Chippewa Falls
32	Clark & Jackson		Jerome A. Watrous	Union	Black River Falls
25	Columbia	1	W. Scott Schermerhorn	Union	Lodi
25	Columbia	2	Ira Ford	Union	Columbus
25	Columbia	3	Evan O. Jones	Union	Cambria
30	Crawford		Ormsby B. Thomas	Union	Prairie du Chien
11	Dane	1	Isaac Adams	Union	Door Creek
11	Dane	2	John M. Flint	Union	Sun Prairie
26	Dane	3	Frank Gault	Dem.	Mendota
26	Dane	4	Hugh Cathcart	Union	Madison
26	Dane	5	Eleazer Wakeley	Dem.	Madison
18	Dodge	1	Miles Burnham	Union	Westford
18	Dodge	2	James B. Hays	Dem.	Juneau
33	Dodge	3	Warren Marston	Dem.	Lomira
33	Dodge	4	John Weatherby	Dem.	Hustisford
02	Door & Kewaunee		David Youngs	Union	Ahnapee
32	Eau Claire & Pepin		Fayette Allen	Union	Ahnapee
20	Fond du Lac	1	Albert M. Skeels	Union	Ripon
20	Fond du Lac	2	A. Chapin Whiting	Union	Ladoga
20	Fond du Lac	3	James Coleman	Union	Fond du Lac
20	Fond du Lac	4	Luther H. Cary	Union	Fond du Lac
20	Fond du Lac	5	Charles D. Gage	Dem.	New Fane
20	Fond du Lac	6	Joseph Wagner	Dem.	Moria
16	Grant	1	Hanmer Robbins	Union	Platteville
16	Grant	2	John Carthew	Union	Rockville
16	Grant	3	Joseph Allen	Union	New California
16	Grant	4	Hugh A. W. McNair	Union	Fennimore
16	Grant	5	Alvery A. Bennett	Union	Glen Haven
24	Green	1	Lucius W. Wright	Union	Monticello
24	Green	2	David Dunwiddie	Union	Brodhead
29	Green Lake		Charles Kilbourn	Union	Princeton
15	Iowa	1	Joseph A. Frost	Union	Avoca
15	Iowa	2	John Green	Union	Moscow
23	Jefferson	1	Thomas Shinnick	Dem.	Watertown
23	Jefferson	2	Gustavus H. Bryant	Union	Lake Mills
23	Jefferson	3	William W. Reed	Union	Jefferson
23	Jefferson	4	Jost D. Petrie	Union	Concord
09	Juneau		Ezra C. Sage	Union	New Lisbon
08	Kenosha		Gideon Truesdell	Union	Kenosha
31	La Crosse	1	Angus Cameron	Union	La Crosse
31	La Crosse	2	Duncan A. Kennedy	Union	Stevenstown
13	Lafayette	1	David J. Seely	Dem.	Elk Grove
13	Lafayette	2	William Monroe	Union	Fayette
19	Manitowoc	1	Nicholas Dittmar	Union	Meeme
19	Manitowoc	2	Michael Murphy	Dem.	Maple Grove
19	Manitowoc	3	Thomas Robinson	Dem.	Manitowoc
27	Marathon & Wood		George Hiles	Dem.	Dexterville
29	Marquette		Charles S. Kelsey	Union	Montello
05	Milwaukee	1	George W. Clason	Dem.	Milwaukee
05	Milwaukee	2	Harrison Carroll Hobart	War Dem.	Milwaukee
06	Milwaukee	3	James McGrath	Dem.	Milwaukee
06	Milwaukee	4	Edwin Hyde	Union	Milwaukee
06	Milwaukee	5	Truman H. Judd	Union	Milwaukee
05	Milwaukee	6	Joseph Phillips	Dem.	Milwaukee
05	Milwaukee	7	William A. Prentiss	Union	Milwaukee
05	Milwaukee	8	Louis Hellberg	Dem.	Milwaukee
06	Milwaukee	9	Valentin Knœll	Dem.	Franklin
05	Milwaukee	10	Henry Fowler	Dem.	Milwaukee
09	Monroe		Stephen B. Johnson	Union	Tomah
22	Oconto & Shawano		Daniel H. Pulcifer	Union	Shawano
22	Outagamie		W. H. P. Bogan	Dem.	Appleton
03	Ozaukee		Frederick W. Horn	Dem.	Cedarburg
28	Pierce		John D. Trumbull	Union	Maiden Rock
27	Portage		Thomas H. McDill	Union	Plover
07	Racine	1	Charles E. Dyer	Union	Racine
07	Racine	2	Hiram D. Morse	Union	Waterford
30	Richland		Ira S. Haseltine	Union	Richland Center
17	Rock	1	Ezra A. Foot	Union	Footville
17	Rock	2	John T. Dow	Union	Cooksville
17	Rock	3	William H. Stark	Union	Tiffany
17	Rock	4	Horatio J. Murray	Union	Beloit
17	Rock	5	Pliny Norcross	Union	Janesville
14	Sauk	1	James I. Waterbury	Union	Prairie du Sac
14	Sauk	2	Stephen Steele Barlow	Union	Delton
01	Sheboygan	1	Joseph Wedig	Union	Sheboygan
01	Sheboygan	2	Richard B. Van Valkenbergh	Union	Greenbush
01	Sheboygan	3	George S. Graves	Union	Sheboygan Falls
28	St. Croix		H. L. Wadsworth	Union	River Falls
32	Trempealeau		John Nicholls	Union	Trempealeau
31	Vernon	1	John W. Greenman	Union	Bergen
31	Vernon	2	Albert Bliss	Union	Readstown
12	Walworth	1	William C. Allen	Union	Delavan
12	Walworth	2	Frank A. Buckbee	Union	Springfield
12	Walworth	3	Thompson D. Weeks	Union	Whitewater
04	Washington	1	Charles H. Miller	Dem.	West Bend
04	Washington	2	Densmore W. Maxon	Dem.	Cedar Creek
10	Waukesha	1	Jesse Smith	Union	Dodges Corners
10	Waukesha	2	Rufus Parks	Union	Waterville
10	Waukesha	3	James Murray	Dem.	New Berlin
27	Waupaca		Eli P. Perry	Union	New London
29	Waushara		Edgar Sears	Union	Pine River
21	Winnebago	1	Henry C. Jewell	Union	Oshkosh
21	Winnebago	2	John Proctor	Union	Neenah
21	Winnebago	3	Milo C. Bushnell	Union	Omro

== Changes from the 19th Legislature ==
New districts for the 20th Legislature were defined in 1866 Wisconsin Act 101, passed into law in the 19th Wisconsin Legislature.

=== Senate redistricting ===
==== Summary of changes ====
- 26 Senate districts were left unchanged.
- Calumet County was moved from the 19th district to the 22nd.
- Door County was moved from the 22nd district to the 2nd.
- Monroe County was moved from the 31st district to the 9th.
- Waushara County was moved from the 9th district to the 29th.
- Vernon County was moved from the 30th district to the 31st.

==== Senate districts ====
after redistricting

before redistricting

Dist.	19th Legislature	20th Legislature
1	Sheboygan County	Sheboygan County
2	Brown, Kewaunee counties	Brown, Door, Kewaunee counties
3	Ozaukee County	Ozaukee County
4	Washington County	Washington County
5	Northern Milwaukee County	Northern Milwaukee County
6	Southern Milwaukee County	Southern Milwaukee County
7	Racine County	Racine County
8	Kenosha County	Kenosha County
9	Adams, Juneau, Waushara counties	Adams, Juneau, Monroe counties
10	Waukesha County	Waukesha County
11	Eastern Dane County	Eastern Dane County
12	Walworth County	Walworth County
13	Lafayette County	Lafayette County
14	Sauk County	Sauk County
15	Iowa County	Iowa County
16	Grant County	Grant County
17	Rock County	Rock County
18	Western Dodge County	Western Dodge County
19	Manitowoc, Calumet counties	Manitowoc County
20	Fond du Lac County	Fond du Lac County
21	Winnebago County	Winnebago County
22	Door, Oconto, Outagamie, Shawanaw counties	Calumet, Oconto, Outagamie, Shawano counties
23	Jefferson County	Jefferson County
24	Green County	Green County
25	Columbia County	Columbia County
26	Western Dane County	Western Dane County
27	Marathon, Portage, Waupaca, Wood counties	Marathon, Portage, Waupaca, Wood counties
28	Ashland, Burnett, Dallas, Douglas, La Pointe (Bayfield), Pierce, Polk, St. Croix counties	Ashland, Bayfield, Burnett, Dallas, Douglas, Pierce, Polk, St. Croix counties
29	Green Lake, Marquette County	Green Lake, Marquette, Waushara counties
30	Bad Ax, Crawford, Richland counties	Crawford, Richland counties
31	La Crosse, Monroe counties	La Crosse, Vernon counties
32	Buffalo, Chippewa, Clark, Dunn, Eau Claire, Jackson, Pepin, Trempealeau counties	Buffalo, Chippewa, Clark, Dunn, Eau Claire, Jackson, Pepin, Trempealeau counties
33	Eastern Dodge County	Eastern Dodge County

=== Assembly redistricting ===
==== Summary of changes ====
- Brown County went from having 1 district to 2.
- Buffalo County became its own assembly district, after previously having been in a shared district with Pepin and Trempealeau counties.
- Eau Claire and Pepin counties became a combined district, Eau Claire had previously been in a shared district with Chippewa and Dunn counties, Pepin had previously been in a shared district with Buffalo and Trempealeau counties.
- Dodge County went from having 5 districts to 4.
- Door and Kewaunee counties became a combined district, Door had previously been in a shared district with Oconto and Shawano counties, Kewaunee had previously been its own Assembly district.
- Fond du Lac County went from having 5 districts to 6.
- La Crosse County went from having 1 district to 2.
- Milwaukee County went from having 9 districts to 10.
- Racine County went from having 3 districts to 2.
- Rock County went from having 6 districts to 5.
- Sheboygan County went from having 4 districts to 3.
- St. Croix County became its own assembly district, after previously having been in a shared district with Pierce County.
- Trempealeau County became its own assembly district, after previously having been in a shared district with Buffalo and Pepin counties.
- Walworth County went from having 4 districts to 3.
- Washington County went from having 3 districts to 2.
- Waukesha County went from having 4 districts to 3.

==== Assembly districts ====
County	Districts in 19th Legislature	Districts in 20th Legislature
Adams	1 District	1 District
Ashland	Shared with Burnett, Dallas, Douglas, La Pointe (Bayfield), Polk	Shared with Bayfield, Burnett, Dallas, Douglas, Polk
Bayfield	Shared with Ashland, Burnett, Dallas, Douglas, Polk	Shared with Ashland, Burnett, Dallas, Douglas, Polk
Brown	1 District	2 Districts
Buffalo	Shared with Pepin, Trempealeau	1 District
Burnett	Shared with Ashland, Dallas, Douglas, La Pointe (Bayfield), Polk	Shared with Ashland, Bayfield, Dallas, Douglas, Polk
Calumet	1 District	1 District
Chippewa	Shared with Dunn, Eau Claire	Shared with Dunn
Clark	Shared with Jackson	Shared with Jackson
Columbia	3 Districts	3 Districts
Crawford	Shared with Bad Ax (Vernon)	1 District
Dallas	Shared with Ashland, Burnett, Douglas, La Pointe (Bayfield), Polk	Shared with Ashland, Bayfield, Burnett, Douglas, Polk
Dane	5 Districts	5 Districts
Dodge	5 Districts	4 Districts
Door	Shared with Oconto, Shawano	Shared with Kewaunee
Douglas	Shared with Ashland, Burnett, Dallas, La Pointe (Bayfield), Polk	Shared with Ashland, Bayfield, Burnett, Dallas, Polk
Dunn	Shared with Chippewa, Eau Claire	Shared with Chippewa
Eau Claire	Shared with Chippewa, Dunn	Shared with Pepin
Fond du Lac	5 Districts	6 Districts
Grant	5 Districts	5 Districts
Green	2 Districts	2 Districts
Green Lake	1 District	1 District
Iowa	2 Districts	2 Districts
Jackson	Shared with Clark	Shared with Clark
Jefferson	4 Districts	4 Districts
Juneau	1 District	1 District
Kenosha	1 District	1 District
Kewaunee	1 District	Shared with Door
La Crosse	1 District	2 Districts
Lafayette	2 Districts	2 Districts
Manitowoc	3 Districts	3 Districts
Marathon	Shared with Wood	Shared with Wood
Marquette	1 District	1 District
Milwaukee	9 Districts	10 Districts
Monroe	1 District	1 District
Oconto	Shared with Door, Shawano	Shared with Shawano
Outagamie	1 District	1 District
Ozaukee	1 District	1 District
Pepin	Shared with Buffalo, Trempealeau	Shared with Eau Claire
Pierce	Shared with St. Croix	Shared with St. Croix
Polk	Shared with Ashland, Burnett, Dallas, Douglas, La Pointe (Bayfield)	Shared with Ashland, Bayfield, Burnett, Dallas, Douglas
Portage	1 District	1 District
Racine	3 Districts	2 Districts
Richland	1 District	1 District
Rock	6 Districts	5 Districts
Sauk	2 Districts	2 Districts
Shawano	Shared with Door, Oconto	Shared with Oconto
Sheboygan	4 Districts	3 Districts
St. Croix	Shared with Pierce	1 District
Trempealeau	Shared with Buffalo, Pepin	1 District
Vernon	2 Districts	2 Districts
Walworth	4 Districts	3 Districts
Washington	3 Districts	3 Districts
Waukesha	4 Districts	3 Districts
Waupaca	1 District	1 District
Waushara	1 District	1 District
Winnebago	3 Districts	3 Districts
Wood	Shared with Marathon	Shared with Marathon
