= 21st Wisconsin Legislature =

Wisconsin legislative term for 1868

←	20th	22nd	→
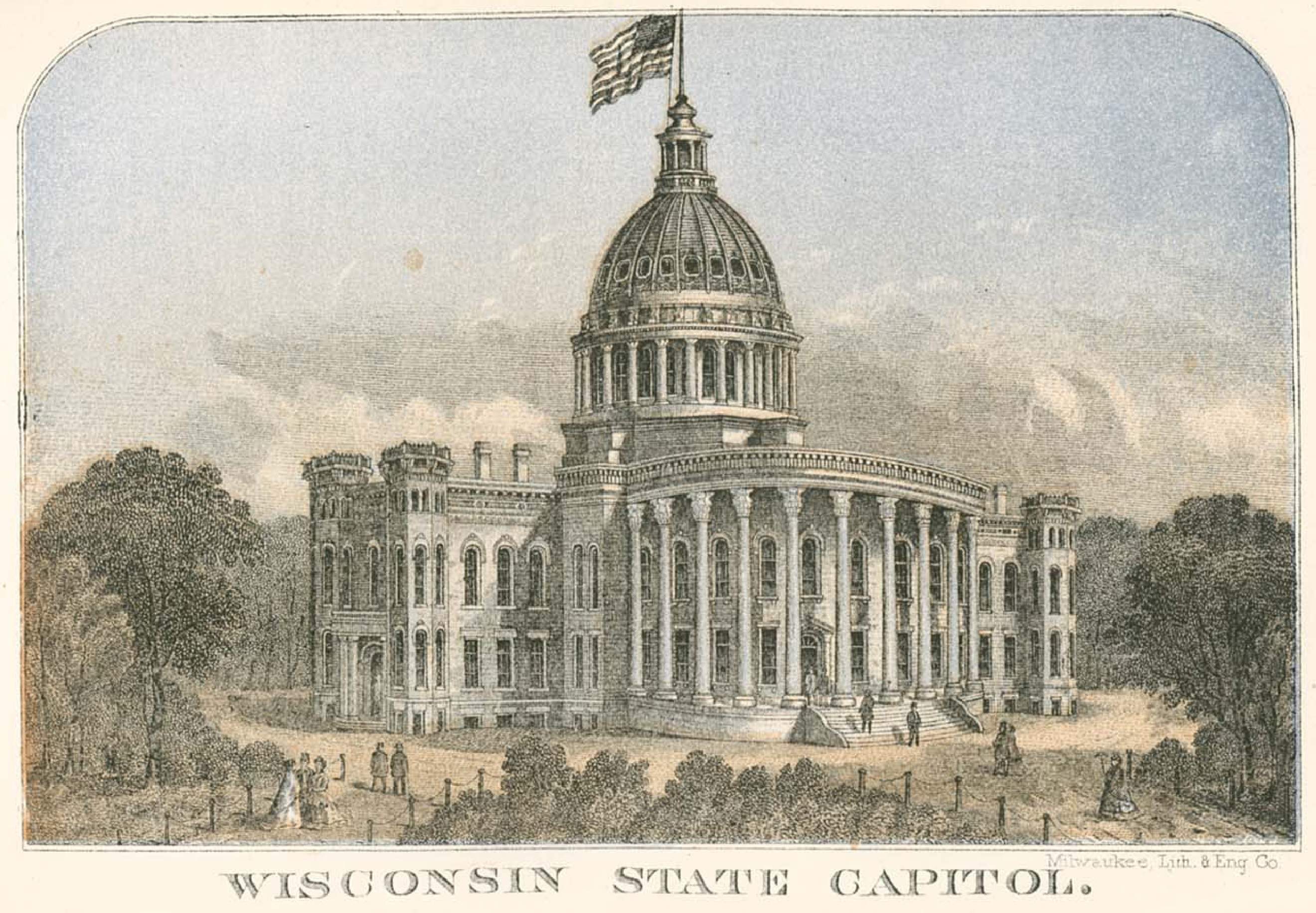
- Wisconsin State Capitol, 1863

Overview
- Legislative body: Wisconsin Legislature
- Meeting place: Wisconsin State Capitol
- Term: January 6, 1868 – January 4, 1869
- Election: November 5, 1867

Senate
- Members: 33
- Senate President: Wyman Spooner (R)
- President pro tempore: Newton Littlejohn (R)
- Party control: Republican

Assembly
- Members: 100
- Assembly Speaker: Alexander M. Thomson (R)
- Party control: Republican

Sessions
- 1st: January 8, 1868 – March 6, 1868

The Twenty-First Wisconsin Legislature convened from January 8, 1868, to March 6, 1868, in regular session.

Senators representing even-numbered districts were newly elected for this session and were serving the first year of a two-year term. Assembly members were elected to a one-year term. Assembly members and even-numbered senators were elected in the general election of November 5, 1867. Senators representing odd-numbered districts were serving the second year of their two-year term, having been elected in the general election held on November 6, 1866.

The governor of Wisconsin during this entire term was Republican Lucius Fairchild, of Dane County, serving the first year of his second two-year term, having won re-election in the 1867 Wisconsin gubernatorial election.

== Major events ==
- February 24, 1868: The United States House of Representatives voted to impeach U.S. President Andrew Johnson for violating the Tenure of Office Act.
- April 29, 1868: General William Tecumseh Sherman brokered the Treaty of Fort Laramie between the United States and the Plains Indians.
- May 26, 1868: In the United States Senate, the impeachment trial of U.S. President Andrew Johnson ended with a verdict of "not guilty".
- July 9, 1868: Fourteenth Amendment to the United States Constitution was ratified by the required three-fourths of U.S. states.
- July 27, 1868: The U.S. Expatriation Act of 1868 was enacted.
- August 11, 1868: U.S. Representative Thaddeus Stevens, a leader of the Radical Republican faction, died at Washington, D.C.
- October 10, 1868: An uprising in Cuba initiated Ten Years' War for Cuban independence from the Spanish Empire.
- October 28, 1868: Thomas Edison applied for his first patent, the electric vote recorder.
- November 3, 1868: Ulysses S. Grant elected 18th President of the United States.
- December 25, 1868: U.S. President Andrew Johnson granted an unconditional pardon to all American Civil War rebels.

== Major legislation ==
- January 22, 1868: Joint Resolution declaring it to be the duty of the general government to protect American citizens in the enjoyment of all their rights as such while sojourning in foreign countries, 1868 Joint Resolution 1, endorsing the proposed federal Expatriation Act of 1868.
- February 6, 1868: An Act to punish frauds upon insurance companies, 1868 Act 14.
- February 19, 1868: An Act to abolish the office of bank comptroller, and transfer his duties to the state treasurer, 1868 Act 28.
- February 22, 1868: Joint Resolution defining the duty of the nation towards its native and adopted citizens, 1868 Joint Resolution 8, also relating to the proposed federal Expatriation Act of 1868.
- February 29, 1868: An Act to legalize dissections, 1868 Act 53.
- March 4, 1868: An Act to provide for the completion of the state capitol, 1868 Act 93.
- March 5, 1868: An Act to accept a grant of lands made to the state of Wisconsin by act of congress, to aid in the construction of the Sturgeon Bay and Lake Michigan ship canal and harbor, in the county of Door, to connect the waters of Green Bay with Lake Michigan, and to provide for the construction of the same, 1868 Act 105.
- March 6, 1868: Joint Resolution instructing senators and representatives in congress to preserve the equilibrium between the coordinate branches of government, 1868 Joint Resolution 23.
- March 6, 1868: An Act to authorize the state treasurer to close up the circulation of certain banks, and for other purposes, 1868 Act 144.
- March 6, 1868: An Act to transfer the war fund to the general fund and discontinue the war fund, 1868 Act 148.
- March 6, 1868: An Act to provide for establishing town libraries in this state, 1868 Act 174.

== Party summary ==
=== Senate summary ===
Senate partisan composition Democratic: 15 seats Republican: 18 seats

	Party (Shading indicates majority caucus)			Total	
	Democratic	Union	Republican	Total	Vacant
End of previous Legislature	11	20	0	31	2
1st Session	15	0	18	33	0
Final voting share	45.45%		54.55%		
Beginning of the next Legislature	14	0	19	33	0

=== Assembly summary ===
Assembly partisan composition Democratic: 41 seats Republican: 59 seats

	Party (Shading indicates majority caucus)			Total	
	Democratic	Union	Republican	Total	Vacant
End of previous Legislature	26	74	0	100	0
Start of 1st Session	41	0	59	100	0
Final voting share	41%		59%		
Beginning of the next Legislature	32	0	68	100	0

== Sessions ==
- 1st Regular session: January 8, 1868 – March 6, 1868

== Leaders ==
=== Senate leadership ===
- President of the Senate: Wyman Spooner (R)
- President pro tempore: Newton Littlejohn (R)

=== Assembly leadership ===
- Speaker of the Assembly: Alexander M. Thomson (R)

== Members ==
=== Members of the Senate ===
Members of the Wisconsin Senate for the Twenty-First Wisconsin Legislature:

Senate partisan representation Democratic: 15 seats Republican: 18 seats

Dist.	Counties	Senator	Residence	Party
01	Sheboygan	Robert H. Hotchkiss	Plymouth	Dem.
02	Brown, Door, Kewaunee	William J. Abrams	Green Bay	Dem.
03	Ozaukee	Lyman Morgan	Ozaukee	Dem.
04	Washington	Adam Schantz	Addison	Dem.
05	Milwaukee (Northern Half)	Henry L. Palmer	Milwaukee	Dem.
06	Milwaukee (Southern Half)	Charles H. Larkin	Milwaukee	Dem.
07	Racine	Henry Stevens	Caledonia	Rep.
08	Kenosha	Anthony Van Wyck	Kenosha	Rep.
09	Adams, Juneau, Monroe	DeWitt C. Wilson	Sparta	Rep.
10	Waukesha	Curtis Mann	Oconomowoc	Dem.
11	Dane (Eastern Part)	Clement Warner	Windsor	Rep.
12	Walworth	Newton Littlejohn	Whitewater	Rep.
13	Lafayette	James H. Earnest	Shullsburg	Dem.
14	Sauk	Stephen S. Barlow	Delton	Rep.
15	Iowa	Joel Whitman	Dodgeville	Rep.
16	Grant	George C. Hazelton	Boscobel	Rep.
17	Rock	Samuel J. Todd	Beloit	Rep.
18	Dodge (Western Part)	Henry W. Lander	Beaver Dam	Dem.
19	Manitowoc	George B. Reed	Manitowoc	Dem.
20	Fond du Lac	Edward S. Bragg	Fond du Lac	Dem.
21	Winnebago	William G. Ritch	Oshkosh	Rep.
22	Calumet, Oconto, Outagamie, Shawano	William Young	Medina	Dem.
23	Jefferson	Gerrit T. Thorn	Jefferson	Dem.
24	Green	Henry Adams	Monticello	Rep.
25	Columbia	Robert B. Sanderson	Poynette	Rep.
26	Dane (Western Part)	Carl Habich	Madison	Dem.
27	Marathon, Portage, Waupaca, Wood	Edward L. Browne	Waupaca	Rep.
28	Ashland, Bayfield, Burnett, Dallas, Douglas, Pierce, St. Croix	William J. Copp	Prescott	Rep.
29	Green Lake, Marquette, Waushara	Henry G. Webb	Wautoma	Rep.
30	Crawford, Richland	William Ketcham	Richland Center	Rep.
31	La Crosse, Vernon	Justin W. Ranney	West Salem	Rep.
32	Buffalo, Chippewa, Clark, Dunn, Eau Claire, Jackson, Pepin, Trempealeau	Alfred W. Newman	Trempealeau	Rep.
33	Dodge (Eastern Part)	Satterlee Clark	Horicon	Dem.

=== Members of the Assembly ===
Members of the Assembly for the Twenty-First Wisconsin Legislature:

Assembly partisan representation Democratic: 41 seats Republican: 59 seats

Senate District	County	District	Representative	Party	Residence
09	Adams		William J. Kershaw	Rep.	Big Spring
28	Ashland, Bayfield, Burnett, Dallas, Douglas, Polk		Henry D. Barron	Rep.	St. Croix Falls
02	Brown	1	John B. Eugene	Rep.	Green Bay
02	Brown	2	David Cooper Ayres	Rep.	Fort Howard
32	Buffalo		Conrad Moser Jr.	Rep.	Alma
22	Calumet		Casper H. M. Petersen	Dem.	New Holstein
32	Chippewa & Dunn		Samuel W. Hunt	Rep.	Menomonie
32	Clark & Jackson		James O'Neill	Rep.	Neillsville
25	Columbia	1	Alanson Holly	Rep.	Kilbourn City
25	Columbia	2	Ira Ford	Rep.	Columbus
25	Columbia	3	David C. Davies	Rep.	Portage
30	Crawford		James Fisher	Dem.	Eastman
11	Dane	1	Nelson Williams	Rep.	Stoughton
11	Dane	2	Knute Nelson	Rep.	Cambridge
26	Dane	3	Frank Gault	Dem.	Mendota
26	Dane	4	Gunnuf Tollefson	Rep.	Mount Vernon
26	Dane	5	Levi B. Vilas	Dem.	Madison
18	Dodge	1	Lawrence Connor	Dem.	Fox Lake
18	Dodge	2	Lewis M. Benson	Dem.	Lowell
33	Dodge	3	Charles E. Goodwin	Dem.	Mayville
33	Dodge	4	George W. Colomy	Dem.	Alderley
02	Door & Kewaunee		Moses Kilgore	Dem.	Baileys Harbor
32	Eau Claire & Pepin		Horace W. Barnes	Rep.	Eau Claire
20	Fond du Lac	1	Henry C. Bottum	Rep.	West Rosendale
20	Fond du Lac	2	Rollin C. Kelley	Rep.	Brandon
20	Fond du Lac	3	David B. Conger	Rep.	Fond du Lac
20	Fond du Lac	4	Seth A. Chase	Rep.	Fond du Lac
20	Fond du Lac	5	Nicholas Klotz	Dem.	Eden
20	Fond du Lac	6	Joseph Wagner	Dem.	Moria
16	Grant	1	Hanmer Robbins	Rep.	Platteville
16	Grant	2	James H. Neaville	Dem.	Potosi
16	Grant	3	Jeremiah Dodge	Rep.	Lancaster
16	Grant	4	Matthew Birchard	Rep.	Fennimore
16	Grant	5	Nathaniel W. Kendall	Rep.	Wyalusing
24	Green	1	Albert H. Pierce	Rep.	Monticello
24	Green	2	Jacob Mason	Rep.	Monroe
29	Green Lake		Ira Manley Jr.	Rep.	Markesan
15	Iowa	1	Goodwin Lowry	Dem.	Helena
15	Iowa	2	Jefferson Rewey	Rep.	Mifflin
23	Jefferson	1	Henry S. Howell	Dem.	Watertown
23	Jefferson	2nd	Charles P. Goodrich	Rep.	Oakland
23	Jefferson	3	Jonas Folts	Dem.	Bark River
23	Jefferson	4	Franz G. L. Struve	Rep.	Helenville
09	Juneau		John O'Rourke	Dem.	Kildare
08	Kenosha		Jacob B. Shibley	Rep.	Bassett
31	La Crosse	1	Theodore Rodolf	Dem.	La Crosse
31	La Crosse	2	Nathan P. Waller	Rep.	West Salem
13	Lafayette	1	Charles Pole	Dem.	Shullsburg
13	Lafayette	2	Samuel Cole	Rep.	Gratiot
19	Manitowoc	1	John H. Bohne	Dem.	Meeme
19	Manitowoc	2	Richard Donovan	Dem.	Manitowoc
19	Manitowoc	3	David Smoke	Dem.	Manitowoc
27	Marathon & Wood		Willis C. Silverthorn	Dem.	Wausau
29	Marquette		Francis Russell	Dem.	Westfield
05	Milwaukee	1	Patrick Drew	Dem.	Milwaukee
05	Milwaukee	2	George Abert	Dem.	Milwaukee
06	Milwaukee	3	James McGrath	Dem.	Milwaukee
06	Milwaukee	4	James M. Reynolds	Dem.	Milwaukee
06	Milwaukee	5	John Fellenz	Dem.	Milwaukee
05	Milwaukee	6	Daniel H. Richards	Dem.	Milwaukee
05	Milwaukee	7	William A. Prentiss	Rep.	Milwaukee
05	Milwaukee	8	Henry C. Runkel	Dem.	Milwaukee
06	Milwaukee	9	Patrick Walsh	Dem.	Hales Corners
06	Milwaukee	10	John Sullivan	Dem.	Ten Mile House
09	Monroe		Charles A. Hunt	Rep.	Melvina
22	Oconto & Shawano		Isaac Stephenson	Rep.	Marinette
22	Outagamie		Thomas R. Hudd	Dem.	Appleton
03	Ozaukee		Frederick W. Horn	Dem.	Cedarburg
28	Pierce		Eleazor Holt	Rep.	Maiden Rock
27	Portage		Benjamin Burr	Dem.	Stevens Point
07	Racine	1	Charles E. Dyer	Rep.	Racine
07	Racine	2	Hiram L. Gilmore	Rep.	North Cape
30	Richland		Warren C. S. Barron	Rep.	Loyd
17	Rock	1	Burr Sprague	Rep.	Orfordville
17	Rock	2	William C. Whitford	Rep.	Milton
17	Rock	3	Almerin M. Carter	Rep.	Johnstown
17	Rock	4	Charles H. Parker	Rep.	Beloit
17	Rock	5	Alexander M. Thomson	Rep.	Janesville
14	Sauk	1	James I. Waterbury	Rep.	Prairie du Sac
14	Sauk	2	John Gillespie	Rep.	Dellona
01	Sheboygan	1	Joseph Wedig	Dem.	Sheboygan
01	Sheboygan	2	John A. Smith	Dem.	Glenbeulah
01	Sheboygan	3	George S. Graves	Rep.	Sheboygan Falls
28	St. Croix		Marcus Fulton	Rep.	Hudson
32	Trempealeau		John Nicholls	Rep.	Trempealeau
31	Vernon	1	Henry Chase	Rep.	Chaseburg
31	Vernon	2	Daniel B. Priest	Rep.	Viroqua
12	Walworth	1	Joseph F. Lyon	Rep.	Darien
12	Walworth	2	John A. Smith	Rep.	Geneva
12	Walworth	3	George A. Ray	Rep.	La Grange
04	Washington	1	George H. Kleffler	Dem.	West Bend
04	Washington	2	Densmore W. Maxon	Dem.	Cedar Creek
10	Waukesha	1	Silas Barber	Dem.	Waukesha
10	Waukesha	2	William Thompson	Rep.	Oconomowoc
10	Waukesha	3	Adam Muehl	Dem.	St. Martin
27	Waupaca		Jarvis W. Carter	Rep.	New London
29	Waushara		Edgar Sears	Rep.	Pine River
21	Winnebago	1	Luther Buxton	Rep.	Oshkosh
21	Winnebago	2	George W. Trask	Rep.	Winneconne
21	Winnebago	3	Milo C. Bushnell	Rep.	Omro

== Employees ==
=== Senate employees ===
- Chief Clerk: L. B. Hills
  - Assistant Clerk: John S. Wilson
    - Bookkeeper: A. W. Wilson
  - Engrossing Clerk: W. L. Abbott
  - Engrossing Clerk: Joseph Copp
  - Transcribing Clerk: David Schreiner
- Sergeant-at-Arms: W. H. Hamilton
  - Assistant Sergeant-at-Arms: S. M. Bond
  - Sergeant-at-Arms' Porter: Thomas Goss
- Postmaster: Frank Leland
  - Assistant Postmaster: J. S. Cavert
- Doorkeeper: Franklin Kelly
  - Assistant Doorkeeper: W. G. McEwen
  - Assistant Doorkeeper: Walter Cook
  - Assistant Doorkeeper: Henry Taylor
  - Assistant Doorkeeper: Thornton Thompson
- Fireman: Francis Downs
- Messengers:
  - Robert B. McCord
  - William Keyes
  - Charlton Turner

=== Assembly employees ===
- Chief Clerk: Ephraim W. Young
  - Assistant Clerk: William M. Newcomb
    - Bookkeeper: O. A. Southmayd
  - Engrossing Clerk: Fred A. Dennett
  - Enrolling Clerk: William A. Prentiss Jr.
  - Transcribing Clerk: William H. Holt
- Sergeant-at-Arms: Charles L. Harris
  - Assistant Sergeant-at-Arms: Alex Stevens
- Postmaster: Luther Poland
  - Assistant Postmaster: D. B. Crandall
- Doorkeepers:
  - Henry Collins
  - Frank Fletcher
  - Thomas Healy
- Firemen:
  - Nahum Bangs
  - John Flood
- Porter: Edwin Glenn
- Speaker's Messenger: Frank Thompson
- Chief Clerk's Messenger: John J. Norton
- Messengers:
  - Thomas A. Robbins
  - T. W. Sutliff
  - William H. Denison
  - Charlie J. Johnson
  - James Burke
  - C. E. Conger
