= Senator Hyde =

Senator Hyde may refer to:

- DeWitt Hyde (1909–1986), Maryland State Senate
- E. B. Hyde (1849–1917), Washington State Senate
- Edwin Hyde (1828–1909), Wisconsin State Senate
- Ephraim H. Hyde (1812–1896), Connecticut State Senate
- Herbert Hyde (1925–2006), North Carolina State Senate
- Thomas W. Hyde (1841–1899), Maine State Senate

== See also ==
- Cindy Hyde-Smith (born 1959), U.S. Senator from Mississippi
