= Justin W. Ranney =

19th century American politician

Member of the Wisconsin Senate from the 31st district
- In office January 7, 1867 – January 4, 1869
- Preceded by: John Alonzo Chandler
- Succeeded by: Cyrus M. Butt

Personal details
- Born: January 4, 1821 Augusta, New York, U.S.
- Died: September 13, 1898 (aged 77) Hamilton, Wisconsin, U.S.
- Resting place: Hamilton Cemetery, West Salem, Wisconsin
- Party: Republican; Natl. Union (1863–1867)
- Spouse: Elizabeth Quackenbush (m. 1849; died 1881)
- Children: Clara M. Ranney^{(b. 1851; died 1877)}; Cassius M. Ranney^{(b. 1855; died 1923)}; Edwin H. Ranney^{(b. 1858; died 1876)}; Minnie L. Ranney^{(b. 1864; died 1864)}; Mary E. Ranney^{(b. 1864; died 1885)}; Jay Worthy Ranney^{(b. 1870; died 1942)}
- Occupation: Farmer

Justin Worthy Ranney (January 4, 1821 – September 13, 1898) was an American farmer, Republican politician, and Wisconsin pioneer. He was a member of the Wisconsin Senate, representing La Crosse and Vernon counties during the 1867 and 1868 sessions. His name was often abbreviated as J. W. Ranney, and his first name was sometimes incorrectly listed as "Joel". (Note: The confusion was possibly due to another Wisconsin pioneer Joel Waitstill Ranney, who also abbreviated his name as "J. W. Ranney", but died in 1866.)

== Biography ==
Justin W. Ranney was born January 4, 1821, in Augusta, New York. He was raised and educated in New York. His mother died in 1835, and his father subsequently remarried. At age 18, Ranney went to work, teaching school for several winters while learning the carpenter's trade in the summers. He ultimately established his own mill and operated it for several years.

In 1854, he sold his interests in New York and moved west to the new state of Wisconsin. He came directly to La Crosse County, and settled on a farm in what is now the town of Hamilton, just outside the village of West Salem, Wisconsin. This farm would be his primary residence for the rest of his life, and his farm would be recognized as one of the most successful in the region.

Ranney was active throughout his life in agricultural interests, but rarely served in elected office. He ran for Wisconsin Senate in 1866 and was nominated at the National Union Party district convention over former state representative William H. Officer. His nomination caused some controversy in the 31st Senate district, which then comprised all of La Crosse and Vernon counties. Prior to 1866, there had been an informal agreement that the next Union nominee for that district would be from Vernon County, but at the convention, the La Crosse delegates stubbornly supported Ranney against Vernon County's William Officer, and finally secured the nomination for Ranney by pledging that Vernon County could have the next two nominations (1868, 1870).

Ranney went on to win the general election, defeating Democrat John C. Kurtze. He served in the 1867 and 1868 legislative sessions, and, as pledged, did not seek renomination in 1868. During 1867, the National Union coalition began to break down over disagreements on reconstruction, and in 1868 Ranney identified with the Republican Party.

Ranney remained active with the Republican Party and was a perennial delegate to the county and district level conventions. While attending the 1870 senatorial convention, Ranney, along with the rest of the La Crosse delegation, again broke their promise to the Vernon delegation and secured the nomination of Angus Cameron over the incumbent Cyrus M. Butt.

In his later years, he also became involved in various agricultural insurance operations, and was an officer in the Shelby Insurance Company.

== Personal life and family ==
Ranney was the eldest of five children born to Eli Ranney and his first wife Eveline (née Parmley). Eli Ranney was a farmer and a native of Massachusetts, he moved to Iowa in 1853 and died there in 1873. Justin's paternal grandfather, Abner Ranney, served in the War of 1812 and lived to be 100 years old.

Ranney married Elizabeth Quackenbush in December 1849. They were married for 31 years before her death in 1881. They had six children together, though one died in infancy and three others died at a young age. Their second son, Edwin, was killed while attempting to jump onto a moving train in 1876.

Ranney died on his farm in Hamilton on September 13, 1898, after a period of poor health.

== Notes ==
Wisconsin Senate
Preceded by John Alonzo Chandler	Member of the Wisconsin Senate from the 31st district January 7, 1867 – January 4, 1869	Succeeded by Cyrus M. Butt
