= 1892 Wisconsin gubernatorial election =

- November 8, 1892
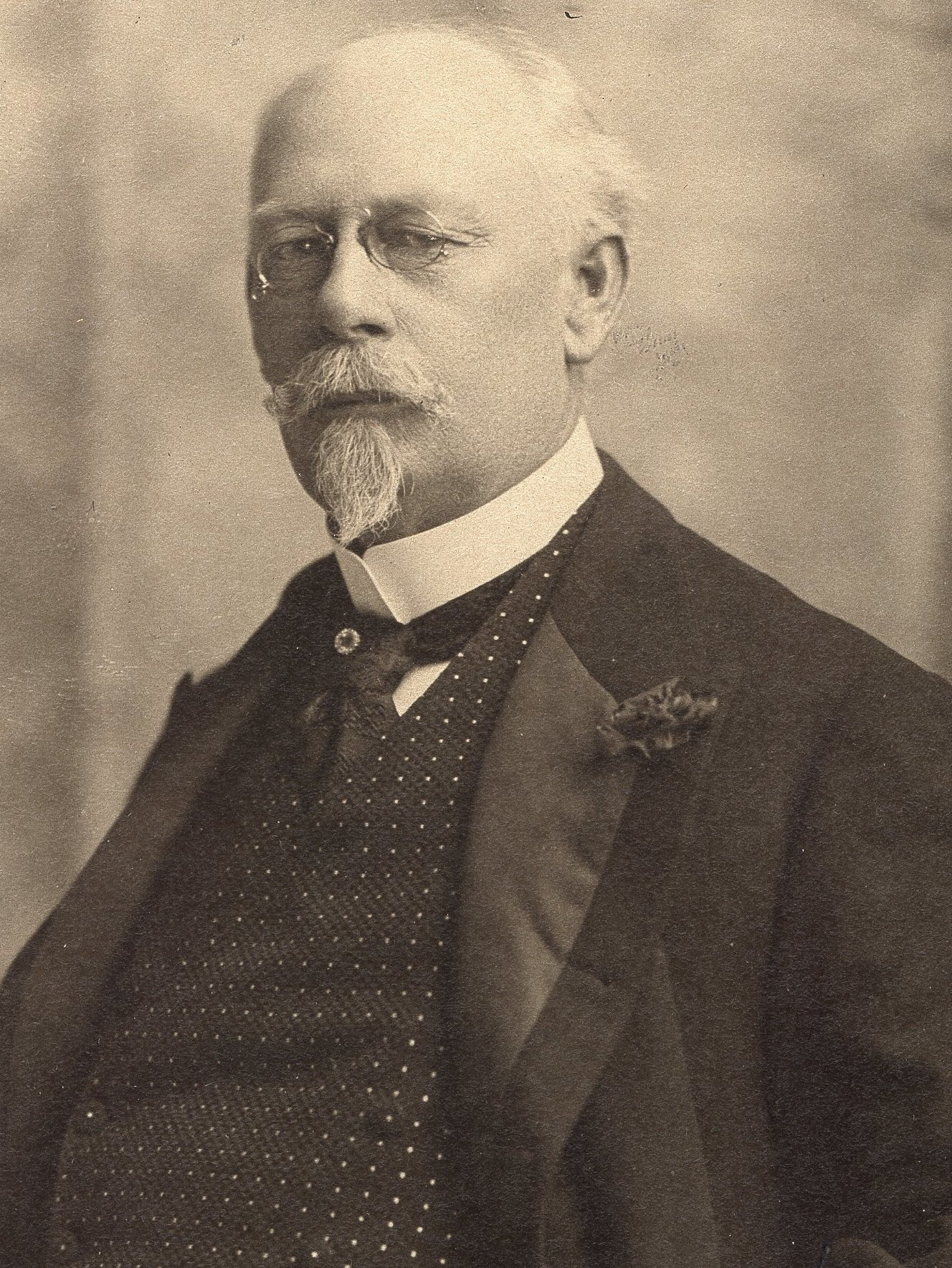

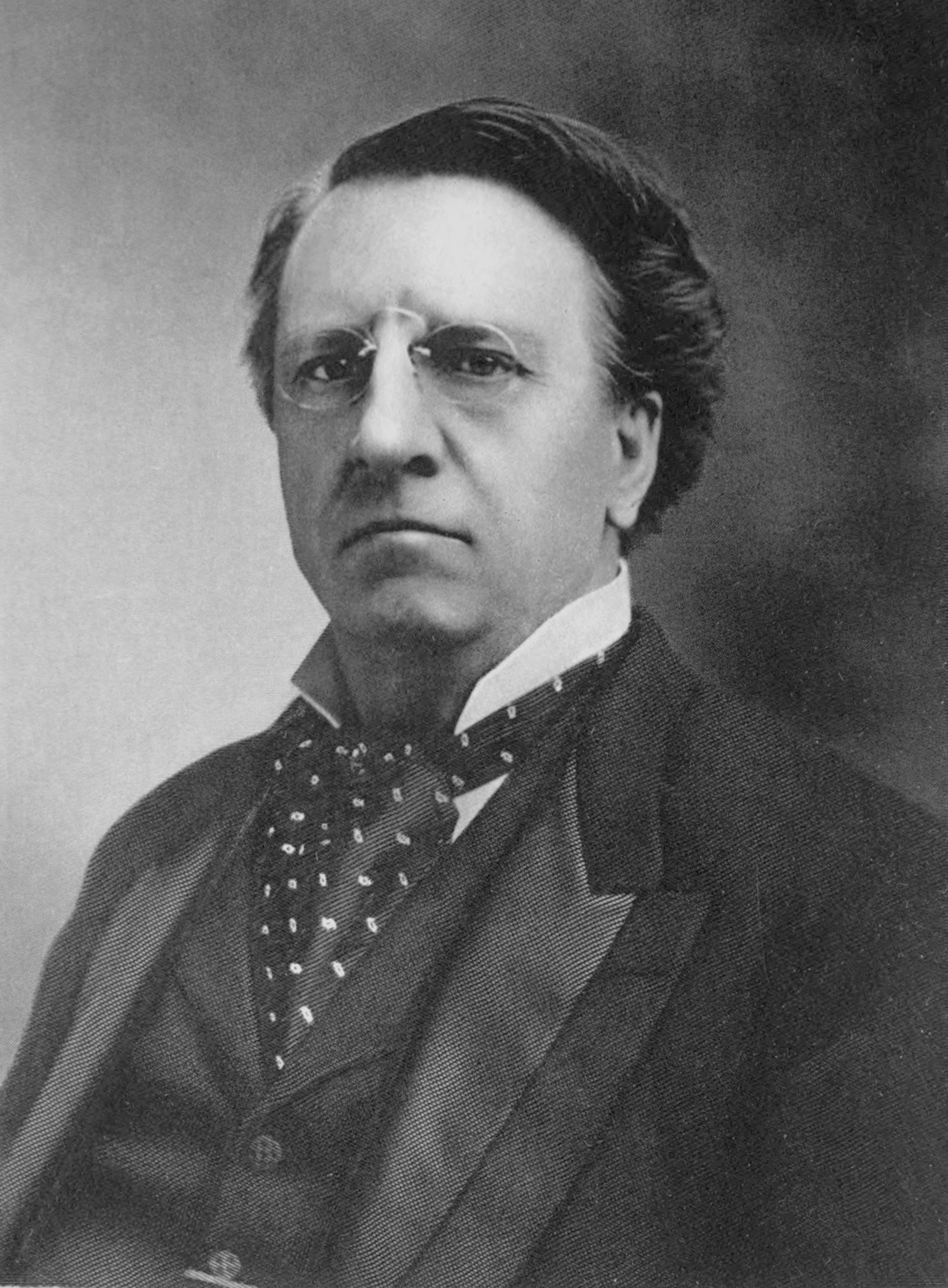
| Nominee | George Wilbur Peck | John Coit Spooner |
| Party | Democratic | Republican |
| Popular vote | 178,095 | 170,497 |
| Percentage | 47.93% | 45.89% |
- County results Peck : 40–50% 50–60% 60–70% 70–80% Spooner : 40–50% 50–60% 60–70%
Governor before election
George Wilbur Peck
Democratic
Elected Governor
George Wilbur Peck
Democratic

The 1892 Wisconsin gubernatorial election was held on November 8, 1892. Incumbent Democratic Governor George Wilbur Peck narrowly defeated Republican nominee John Coit Spooner, becoming the first Democratic governor of Wisconsin to be reelected since Nelson Dewey in 1849. (Note: William A. Barstow's reelection in 1855 was declared illegitimate by the state Supreme Court in early 1856, although Barstow had begun serving the new term before being forced to resign.)

During this era, Wisconsin leaned Republican but was competitive, with all but two gubernatorial elections since the Civil War having been decided by single digits. The Democrats had been swept to power in the state in 1890 due to backlash against the Bennett Law and other national Republican policies such as the McKinley Tariff. The state election was held at the same time as the presidential election, with Peck eking out a similar plurality to that of Grover Cleveland. After this election, however, the state would swing heavily in favor of the Republican Party as the existing Democratic Party's coalition disintegrated during the mid-1890s. Wisconsin would not elect another Democrat as governor until 1932.

== General election ==
=== Candidates ===
Major party candidates

- George Wilbur Peck, Democratic, incumbent Governor
- John Coit Spooner, Republican, former U.S. Senator

Other candidates

- Thomas C. Richmond, Prohibition, Prohibition nominee for Wisconsin's 3rd congressional district in 1888
- Cyrus M. Butt, Populist, former Republican State Senator

=== Results ===
1892 Wisconsin gubernatorial election (Note: The Blue Book is an unreliable source for election data in Wisconsin from about 1890 to 1920. In this case, it has the correct totals but contains many mistakes in the county figures.)
| Party | Candidate | Votes | % | ±% |
|---|---|---|---|---|
| Democratic | George W. Peck (incumbent) | 178,095 | 47.93% | −3.93% |
| Republican | John C. Spooner | 170,497 | 45.89% | +3.18% |
| Prohibition | Thomas C. Richmond | 13,185 | 3.55% | −0.09% |
| Populist | Cyrus M. Butt | 9,638 | 2.59% | +0.83% |
| | Scattering | 2 | 0.00% | |
| | Blank | 142 | 0.04% | |
| Majority | | 7,598 | 2.04% | |
| Turnout | | 371,559 | 100.00% | |
| Democratic hold | | Swing | -7.12% | |

=== Results by county ===
Peck was the first Democrat since James B. Cross in 1857 to win Juneau County. However, Juneau County, along with Oconto County and Shawano County would not vote Democratic again until the next Democratic victory in 1932. Marinette County would also not vote Democratic again until 1934.

This was the last election until 1958 in which Clark County, Green County, and Waupaca County voted for the losing candidate. Even more impressively, however, this was the last time until 1978 that St. Croix County failed to vote for the statewide winner; its bellwether streak that would begin in the next election would reach 40 consecutive elections of voting for the winning candidate.

| County | George W. Peck Democratic | | John C. Spooner Republican | | Thomas C. Richmond Prohibition | | Cyrus M. Butt Populist | | Margin | | Total votes cast |
| County | # | % | # | % | # | % | # | % | # | % | Total votes cast |
|---|---|---|---|---|---|---|---|---|---|---|---|
| Adams | 408 | 28.94% | 967 | 68.58% | 22 | 1.56% | 13 | 0.92% | -559 | -39.65% | 1,410 |
| Ashland | 2,444 | 48.52% | 2,396 | 47.57% | 144 | 2.86% | 53 | 1.05% | 48 | 0.95% | 5,037 |
| Barron | 781 | 24.70% | 1,784 | 56.42% | 196 | 6.20% | 399 | 12.62% | -1,003 | -31.72% | 3,162 (Note: Includes 2 Blank votes) |
| Bayfield | 1,391 | 47.80% | 1,421 | 48.83% | 68 | 2.34% | 30 | 1.03% | -30 | -1.03% | 2,910 |
| Brown | 3,682 | 54.61% | 2,842 | 42.15% | 181 | 2.68% | 37 | 0.55% | 840 | 12.46% | 6,742 |
| Buffalo | 1,396 | 45.43% | 1,513 | 49.24% | 63 | 2.05% | 101 | 3.29% | -117 | -3.81% | 3,073 |
| Burnett | 55 | 7.70% | 403 | 56.44% | 165 | 23.11% | 91 | 12.75% | -238 (Note: Spooner's margin over Richmond) | -33.33% | 714 |
| Calumet | 1,871 | 64.63% | 919 | 31.74% | 24 | 0.83% | 81 | 2.80% | 952 | 32.88% | 2,895 |
| Chippewa | 2,573 | 51.27% | 1,950 | 38.85% | 190 | 3.79% | 306 | 6.10% | 623 | 12.41% | 5,019 |
| Clark | 1,728 | 43.54% | 2,046 | 51.55% | 155 | 3.91% | 40 | 1.01% | -318 | -8.01% | 3,969 |
| Columbia | 2,994 | 44.45% | 3,288 | 48.82% | 404 | 6.00% | 49 | 0.73% | -294 | -4.37% | 6,735 |
| Crawford | 1,612 | 46.52% | 1,727 | 49.84% | 52 | 1.50% | 74 | 2.14% | -115 | -3.32% | 3,465 |
| Dane | 6,738 | 46.88% | 6,588 | 45.83% | 976 | 6.79% | 71 | 0.49% | 150 | 1.04% | 14,374 (Note: Includes 1 Scattering vote) |
| Dodge | 6,833 | 70.39% | 2,631 | 27.10% | 202 | 2.08% | 41 | 0.42% | 4,202 | 43.29% | 9,707 |
| Door | 1,020 | 37.39% | 1,574 | 57.70% | 66 | 2.42% | 68 | 2.49% | -554 | -20.31% | 2,728 |
| Douglas | 2,231 | 39.02% | 2,932 | 51.29% | 194 | 3.39% | 360 | 6.30% | -701 | -12.26% | 5,717 |
| Dunn | 1,279 | 29.86% | 2,176 | 50.81% | 221 | 5.16% | 607 | 14.17% | -897 | -20.94% | 4,283 |
| Eau Claire | 2,419 | 42.45% | 2,709 | 47.54% | 391 | 6.86% | 179 | 3.14% | -290 | -5.09% | 5,698 |
| Florence | 198 | 29.95% | 447 | 67.62% | 11 | 1.66% | 5 | 0.76% | -249 | -37.67% | 661 |
| Fond du Lac | 5,318 | 54.67% | 4,077 | 41.91% | 240 | 2.47% | 93 | 0.96% | 1,241 | 12.76% | 9,728 |
| Forest | 239 | 49.90% | 221 | 46.14% | 14 | 2.92% | 5 | 1.04% | 18 | 3.76% | 479 |
| Grant | 3,690 | 43.92% | 4,206 | 50.07% | 433 | 5.15% | 71 | 0.85% | -516 | -6.14% | 8,401 |
| Green | 2,071 | 40.88% | 2,311 | 45.62% | 363 | 7.17% | 321 | 6.34% | -240 | -4.74% | 5,066 |
| Green Lake | 1,817 | 53.88% | 1,434 | 42.53% | 99 | 2.94% | 22 | 0.65% | 383 | 11.36% | 3,372 |
| Iowa | 2,346 | 46.93% | 2,260 | 45.21% | 364 | 7.28% | 29 | 0.58% | 86 | 1.72% | 4,999 |
| Jackson | 1,189 | 34.07% | 2,066 | 59.20% | 208 | 5.96% | 27 | 0.77% | -877 | -25.13% | 3,490 |
| Jefferson | 4,676 | 61.74% | 2,668 | 35.23% | 213 | 2.81% | 17 | 0.22% | 2,008 | 26.51% | 7,574 |
| Juneau | 2,014 | 48.68% | 1,929 | 46.63% | 146 | 3.53% | 48 | 1.16% | 85 | 2.05% | 4,137 |
| Kenosha | 1,959 | 51.74% | 1,608 | 42.47% | 72 | 1.90% | 13 | 0.34% | 351 | 9.27% | 3,786 (Note: Includes 134 Blank votes) |
| Kewaunee | 2,039 | 78.42% | 530 | 20.38% | 7 | 0.27% | 24 | 0.92% | 1,509 | 58.04% | 2,600 |
| La Crosse | 3,816 | 44.17% | 3,713 | 42.98% | 352 | 4.07% | 758 | 8.77% | 103 | 1.19% | 8,639 |
| Lafayette | 2,295 | 46.34% | 2,367 | 47.79% | 214 | 4.32% | 77 | 1.55% | -72 | -1.45% | 4,953 |
| Langlade | 1,298 | 58.76% | 853 | 38.61% | 46 | 2.08% | 12 | 0.54% | 445 | 20.14% | 2,209 |
| Lincoln | 1,479 | 50.22% | 981 | 33.31% | 85 | 2.89% | 400 | 13.58% | 498 | 16.91% | 2,945 |
| Manitowoc | 4,347 | 65.06% | 2,254 | 33.73% | 28 | 0.42% | 53 | 0.79% | 2,093 | 31.32% | 6,682 |
| Marathon | 3,820 | 64.72% | 1,901 | 32.21% | 74 | 1.25% | 107 | 1.81% | 1,919 | 32.51% | 5,902 |
| Marinette | 1,985 | 46.56% | 1,817 | 42.62% | 202 | 4.74% | 259 | 6.08% | 168 | 3.94% | 4,263 |
| Marquette | 1,205 | 56.33% | 875 | 40.91% | 53 | 2.48% | 6 | 0.28% | 330 | 15.43% | 2,139 |
| Milwaukee | 24,465 | 48.23% | 24,480 | 48.26% | 495 | 0.98% | 1,282 | 2.53% | -15 | -0.03% | 50,722 |
| Monroe | 2,479 | 46.00% | 2,530 | 46.95% | 270 | 5.01% | 110 | 2.04% | -51 | -0.95% | 5,389 |
| Oconto | 1,521 | 51.44% | 1,268 | 42.88% | 39 | 1.32% | 129 | 4.36% | 253 | 8.56% | 2,957 |
| Oneida | 1,322 | 51.90% | 1,143 | 44.88% | 36 | 1.41% | 46 | 1.81% | 179 | 7.03% | 2,547 |
| Outagamie | 4,612 | 60.30% | 2,718 | 35.53% | 221 | 2.89% | 98 | 1.28% | 1,894 | 24.76% | 7,649 |
| Ozaukee | 2,121 | 75.80% | 620 | 22.16% | 10 | 0.36% | 47 | 1.68% | 1,501 | 53.65% | 2,798 |
| Pepin | 535 | 35.88% | 860 | 57.68% | 86 | 5.77% | 10 | 0.67% | -325 | -21.80% | 1,491 |
| Pierce | 1,244 | 30.79% | 2,319 | 57.40% | 300 | 7.43% | 177 | 4.38% | -1,075 | -26.61% | 4,040 |
| Polk | 599 | 24.48% | 1,450 | 59.26% | 183 | 7.48% | 215 | 8.79% | -851 | -34.78% | 2,447 |
| Portage | 2,605 | 50.72% | 2,265 | 44.10% | 218 | 4.24% | 48 | 0.93% | 340 | 6.62% | 5,136 |
| Price | 891 | 42.82% | 1,090 | 52.38% | 73 | 3.51% | 27 | 1.30% | -199 | -9.56% | 2,081 |
| Racine | 3,762 | 44.11% | 3,924 | 46.01% | 353 | 4.14% | 489 | 5.73% | -162 | -1.90% | 8,528 |
| Richland | 1,696 | 38.57% | 2,200 | 50.03% | 233 | 5.30% | 268 | 6.10% | -504 | -11.46% | 4,397 |
| Rock | 4,251 | 38.78% | 6,017 | 54.88% | 578 | 5.27% | 117 | 1.07% | -1,766 | -16.11% | 10,963 |
| Sauk | 3,183 | 46.30% | 3,250 | 47.27% | 398 | 5.79% | 44 | 0.64% | -67 | -0.97% | 6,875 |
| Sawyer | 330 | 42.09% | 411 | 52.42% | 37 | 4.72% | 6 | 0.77% | -81 | -10.33% | 784 |
| Shawano | 2,055 | 55.63% | 1,326 | 35.90% | 47 | 1.27% | 266 | 7.20% | 729 | 19.73% | 3,694 |
| Sheboygan | 5,142 | 56.99% | 3,618 | 40.10% | 99 | 1.10% | 164 | 1.82% | 1,524 | 16.89% | 9,023 |
| St. Croix | 2,218 | 42.78% | 2,512 | 48.45% | 388 | 7.48% | 67 | 1.29% | -294 | -5.67% | 5,185 |
| Taylor | 921 | 53.99% | 724 | 42.44% | 30 | 1.76% | 31 | 1.82% | 197 | 11.55% | 1,706 |
| Trempealeau | 1,526 | 38.61% | 2,113 | 53.47% | 274 | 6.93% | 39 | 0.99% | -587 | -14.85% | 3,952 |
| Vernon | 1,417 | 27.34% | 3,071 | 59.25% | 240 | 4.63% | 455 | 8.78% | -1,654 | -31.91% | 5,183 |
| Walworth | 2,148 | 32.34% | 3,911 | 58.89% | 508 | 7.65% | 74 | 1.11% | -1,763 | -26.55% | 6,641 |
| Washburn | 322 | 38.29% | 472 | 56.12% | 32 | 3.80% | 15 | 1.78% | -150 | -17.84% | 841 |
| Washington | 2,650 | 60.93% | 1,672 | 38.45% | 20 | 0.46% | 7 | 0.16% | 978 | 22.49% | 4,349 |
| Waukesha | 3,625 | 47.96% | 3,603 | 47.67% | 241 | 3.19% | 83 | 1.10% | 22 | 0.29% | 7,558 (Note: Includes 6 Blank votes) |
| Waupaca | 2,206 | 37.16% | 3,385 | 57.02% | 304 | 5.12% | 42 | 0.71% | -1,179 | -19.86% | 5,937 |
| Waushara | 788 | 25.74% | 2,097 | 68.51% | 144 | 4.70% | 32 | 1.05% | -1,309 | -42.76% | 3,061 |
| Winnebago | 5,955 | 50.17% | 5,305 | 44.70% | 337 | 2.84% | 272 | 2.29% | 650 | 5.48% | 11,869 |
| Wood | 2,250 | 54.97% | 1,759 | 42.98% | 53 | 1.29% | 31 | 0.76% | 491 | 12.00% | 4,093 |
| Total | 178,095 | 47.93% | 170,497 | 45.89% | 13,185 | 3.55% | 9,638 | 2.59% | 7,598 | 2.04% | 371,559 |

==== Counties that flipped from Republican to Democratic ====
- Ashland
- Juneau

==== Counties that flipped from Democratic to Republican ====
- Buffalo
- Crawford
- Eau Claire
- Green
- Milwaukee
- Monroe
- Price
- Racine
- Sauk
- Washburn
