= Cyrus M. Butt =

19th century American politician

C. M. Butt

Judge of Vernon County, Wisconsin
- In office January 1, 1878 – January 1, 1890
- Preceded by: James E. Newell
- Succeeded by: O. B. Wyman

Member of the Wisconsin Senate from the 31st district
- In office January 4, 1869 – January 2, 1871
- Preceded by: Justin W. Ranney
- Succeeded by: Angus Cameron

District Attorney of Vernon County, Wisconsin
- In office January 1, 1872 – January 1, 1876
- Preceded by: Carson Graham
- Succeeded by: H. P. Proctor
- In office January 1, 1860 – January 1, 1862
- Preceded by: R. C. Bierce
- Succeeded by: William F. Terhune

Treasurer of Vernon County, Wisconsin
- In office June 1, 1866 – January 1, 1870
- Preceded by: James Lowrie
- Succeeded by: J. W. Allen

Personal details
- Born: September 30, 1833 Deerfield Township, Ohio, U.S.
- Died: August 27, 1921 (aged 87) Viroqua, Wisconsin, U.S.
- Resting place: Viroqua Cemetery, Viroqua, Wisconsin
- Party: Democratic; Populist (1892); Republican (before 1885)
- Spouse: Margaret Elizabeth McAuley (m. 1864; died 1913)
- Children: Esther Fretwell Butt^{(b. 1868; died 1930)}; William Edward Butt^{(b. 1870; died 1946)}; Jane H. Butt^{(b. 1872; died 1962)}; Cyrus Marion Butt Jr.^{(b. 1874; died 1909)}; Margaret Elizabeth (Smith)^{(b. 1878; died 1967)}

Military service
- Allegiance: United States
- Branch/service: United States Volunteers; Union Army
- Years of service: 1862–1866
- Rank: Major, USV
- Unit: 25th Reg. Wis. Vol. Infantry; 48th Reg. Wis. Vol. Infantry
- Battles/wars: American Civil War: Vicksburg campaign; Meridian campaign; Atlanta campaign; Savannah campaign; Carolinas campaign

Cyrus Marion Butt Sr. (September 30, 1833 – August 27, 1921) was an American farmer, lawyer, politician, and Wisconsin pioneer. He was a member of the Wisconsin Senate during the 1869 and 1870 sessions, representing La Crosse and Vernon counties. He also served six years as district attorney and 12 years as county judge in Vernon County, and served as a Union Army officer through much of the American Civil War. In historical documents, his name is often abbreviated as C. M. Butt.

== Early life and career ==
Cyrus M. Butt was born in Deerfield Township, Ohio, in September 1833. He was raised and educated there, and in 1856 began studying law in McConnelsville, Ohio. In the fall of 1857, he went west to Des Moines, Iowa, before settling in Viroqua, Wisconsin, the following spring. Before being admitted to the bar, he was hired as one of the first school teachers in the young village of Viroqua. He was admitted to the bar in 1859, and that same year he was elected district attorney of Vernon County, Wisconsin, running on the Republican Party ticket. He was offered renomination for another two-year term in 1861, but declined in order to run for the Wisconsin Senate. He was narrowly defeated in the 1861 election by Norman S. Cate, who had been nominated as a Union candidate, losing by just 87 votes.

== Civil War service ==
After losing the Senate election, Butt volunteered for service in the Union Army and was enrolled as first lieutenant of Company A in the 25th Wisconsin Infantry Regiment. The regiment mustered into federal service on September 14, 1862, but rather than proceeding south to the front, they were sent west to Minnesota to deal with the Dakota War of 1862. They arrived at Saint Paul, Minnesota, on September 20, and the regiment was split into smaller units spread over central and southern Minnesota to protect settlers. They remained on duty in Minnesota until December, when they returned to Camp Randall.

On February 17, 1863, the regiment left Camp Randall again, this time heading south to the vicinity of Vicksburg, Mississippi, where they engaged in the Siege of Vicksburg, attached to XVI Corps, until the surrender of Vicksburg in July 1863. Subsequently, they were assigned to guard duty in eastern Kansas, where the regiment suffered significantly from disease. On August 16, the regiment reported only 90 men fit for duty; on August 17, their lieutenant colonel, Samuel J. Nasmith, died of disease. Butt's company commander, James Berry, was discharged that fall; Butt, as the next highest ranking officer, took command of the company and was formally promoted to captain in January 1864.

They remained in Kansas until February 1864, when they rejoined XVI Corps to participate in Sherman's Meridian campaign. After that, they were attached to the Army of the Tennessee on Sherman's Atlanta campaign, where they saw their most significant combat. They were on the extreme left of the Union line, attacking the enemy trenches during the Battle of Resaca, and were then skirmished with the retreating enemy at the Battle of Dallas. They were then engaged in the defense of Union supply lines around Decatur, Georgia, where they were engaged in severe fighting associated with the Battle of Atlanta against two divisions of dismounted cavalry under Joseph Wheeler. In the fighting, their colonel, Milton Montgomery, was shot and captured. The then-lieutenant colonel, Jeremiah McLain Rusk, was also nearly captured. The regiment then went into the line of siege around Atlanta until the surrender of the city.

During Sherman's March to the Sea, Butt was detached from his regiment and assigned acting ordinance officer for the 1st division, XVII Corps. He remained in that role until February 1865, when he was promoted to major and assigned to the newly-raised 48th Wisconsin Infantry Regiment.

The 48th Wisconsin Infantry was distributed around Kansas on provost duty through the end of the war. In August 1865, the regiment was assembled and assigned to guard mail and other government material through Indian territory in central and western Kansas. Four companies of the regiment were mustered out in December 1865, along with the regiment staff and most of the field officers, except for Butt and the lieutenant colonel, Henry B. Shears. At that time, Shears was designated colonel and Butt was designated lieutenant colonel, but they were never mustered at that rank. Nevertheless, he was often referred to as "colonel" for the rest of his life. Butt mustered out on February 19, 1866.

== Political career ==
Almost immediately after returning from the war, Butt was appointed treasurer of Vernon County to replace James Lowrie, who had resigned. He ultimately served four years as treasurer. During that time, he was also elected to the village board of Viroqua, Wisconsin, and became village president in March 1868.

In 1868, he was the Republican Party nominee for Wisconsin Senate in the 31st Senate district. He defeated Democrat James H. Lambert in the general election, receiving 70% of the vote. He did not run for re-election in 1870, but in 1871 he was elected district attorney for the second time. He was re-elected as district attorney in 1873. In 1877, he was elected county judge. He was re-elected as county judge in 1881 and 1885. In 1882, he was the Republican nominee for United States House of Representatives in Wisconsin's 7th congressional district, but lost a close election to Democrat Gilbert M. Woodward.

Butt was a frequent delegate to Republican conventions in Vernon County throughout the 1860s, 1870s, and the early 1880s. In January 1882, he had been appointed an agent by his former Union Army colleague, Governor Jeremiah McLain Rusk, to disburse overdue wages to rioting railroad laborers on the Chicago, St. Paul, Minneapolis and Omaha Railway. This required him to make a trip to Superior, Wisconsin, and other sites to verify claims and make payments. In October 1884, as Rusk was running for re-election, Butt alleged that he had received instructions from Rusk to only pay workers who were present in person at Superior, and after his trip to Superior, he was instructed to delay making further payments. He alleged that the governor was conspiring with the Omaha Railroad to delay making the payments in hopes that those holding claims for collection could be induced to sell their claims at a discount to agents of the Omaha Company, who could then collect the full claim amount. Despite Butt's claims of corruption, Rusk won re-election in 1884. The truth or fiction of the corruption was lost to history, but Butt's testimony was considered a betrayal by the Republican Party establishment; he never ran on the Republican Party ticket again.

In 1886, Butt ran for Wisconsin State Assembly on the Democratic Party ticket. He was soundly defeated in the general election by Republican incumbent Samuel Sloggy, receiving only 38% of the vote.

Butt had always been an avid farmer and was active in many of the farm groups of the county and state. He became involved in the populist Farmers Alliance, which later became part of the People's Party (or Populists), coalescing with other populist groups of laborers and anti-monopolists. Butt was the Populist nominee for Governor of Wisconsin in the 1892 Wisconsin gubernatorial election, but came in a distant 4th in the general election, behind the Prohibition candidate.

After 1894 election, the populists in Wisconsin went into a coalition with the Democrats. Butt, who was then a strong proponent of free silver, was nominated by the populists as their candidate for Secretary of State, and was therefore adopted by the Democrats also as their nominee. The whole fusion ticket went down to defeat in the 1896 election; Butt received only 37% of the vote.

In his later years, Butt abandoned politics and focused on his legal career, partnering with his son Cyrus Jr. During these years, he was described as one of the leading probate attorneys in the state, and a leader of the western Wisconsin bar. He was also active throughout much of his career on the Viroqua school board, serving 27 years total, and was a trustee of the Vernon County asylum for 21 years.

In October 1910, Butt was struck with a severe illness and several newspapers reported that he was expected to die shortly. He recovered, however, and went on to live another 11 years.

Butt died at his home in Viroqua on August 27, 1921, after suffering from a series of strokes over his last several years.

== Personal life and legacy ==
Cyrus M. Butt married Margaret Elizabeth McAuley in 1864. They had five children together and were married for nearly 50 years before her death. After his wife's death in 1913, Butt was cared for by his unmarried daughters Esther and Jane (Jennie). At the time of his death, he was survived by four of his children and one grandson.

His son Cyrus Jr., who had been his one-time law partner, died young of a sudden acute illness in 1909.

His surviving son, William Edward Butt, became a prominent physician in Viroqua and lived there until his death in 1946.

Butt's former home in Viroqua, which he built in 1870, is still standing and preserved, at 795 N. Main St.

== Electoral history ==
=== Wisconsin Senate (1868) ===
Wisconsin Senate, 31st District Election, 1868
Party	Candidate	Votes	%	±%
General Election, November 3, 1868
Republican	Cyrus M. Butt	4,557	69.67%	
Democratic	James H. Lambert	1,984	30.33%	
Plurality		2,573	39.34%	
Total votes		6,541	100.0%	
Republican hold				

=== U.S. House of Representatives (1882) ===
Wisconsin's 7th Congressional District Election, 1882
Party	Candidate	Votes	%	±%
General Election, November 7, 1882
Democratic	Gilbert M. Woodward	11,908	48.09%	+17.43pp
Republican	Cyrus M. Butt	10,604	42.82%	−21.82pp
Prohibition	B. F. Parker	1,887	7.62%	
Greenback	Reuben May	360	1.45%	−3.22pp
	Scattering	4	0.02%	
Plurality		1,304	5.27%	-28.72pp
Total votes		24,763	100.0%	-30.94%
Democratic gain from Republican				

=== Wisconsin Assembly (1886) ===
Wisconsin Assembly, Vernon 2nd District Election, 1886
Party	Candidate	Votes	%	±%
General Election, November 2, 1886
Republican	Samuel Sloggy (incumbent)	1,340	54.16%	
Democratic	Cyrus M. Butt	946	38.24%	
Prohibition	E. W. Sandon	188	7.60%	
Plurality		394	15.93%	
Total votes		2,474	100.0%	
Republican hold				

=== Wisconsin Governor (1892) ===
Wisconsin Gubernatorial Election, 1892
Party	Candidate	Votes	%	±%
General Election, November 8, 1892
Democratic	George Wilbur Peck (incumbent)	178,095	47.93%	−3.93pp
Republican	John Coit Spooner	170,497	45.89%	+3.18pp
Prohibition	Thomas C. Richmond	13,185	3.55%	−0.09pp
Populist	Cyrus M. Butt	9,638	2.59%	
	Scattering	144	0.04%	
Plurality		7,598	2.04%	-7.11pp
Total votes		371,559	100.0%	+20.15%
Democratic hold				

=== Wisconsin Secretary of State (1896) ===
Wisconsin Secretary of State Election, 1896
Party	Candidate	Votes	%	±%
General Election, November 3, 1896
Republican	Henry Casson (incumbent)	265,832	60.03%	+6.70pp
Democratic	Cyrus M. Butt	167,590	37.85%	+0.73pp
Prohibition	Eugene B. Knowlton	8,086	1.83%	−1.13pp
Socialist Labor	Jacob Rummel	1,323	0.30%	
Plurality		98,242	22.18%	+5.97pp
Total votes		442,831	100.0%	+19.45%
Republican hold				

Party political offices
First	Populist nominee for Governor of Wisconsin; 1892	Succeeded by David Franklin Powell
Preceded by Thomas Cunningham	Democratic nominee for Secretary of State of Wisconsin; 1896	Succeeded by Peter Olson Stromme
Wisconsin Senate
Preceded by Justin W. Ranney	Member of the Wisconsin Senate from the 31st district January 4, 1869 – January 2, 1871	Succeeded by Angus Cameron
Political offices
Preceded by James Lowrie	Treasurer of Vernon County, Wisconsin; June 1, 1866 – January 1, 1870	Succeeded by J. W. Allen
Legal offices
Preceded by R. C. Bierce	District Attorney of Vernon County, Wisconsin; January 1, 1860 – January 1, 1862	Succeeded by William F. Terhune
Preceded by Carson Graham	District Attorney of Vernon County, Wisconsin; January 1, 1872 – January 1, 1876	Succeeded by H. P. Proctor
Preceded by James E. Newell	Judge of Vernon County, Wisconsin; January 1, 1878 – January 1, 1890	Succeeded by O. B. Wyman
