= John Alonzo Chandler =

19th century American politician

John A. Chandler

Member of the Wisconsin Senate from the 31st district
- In office January 2, 1865 – January 7, 1867
- Preceded by: Angus Cameron
- Succeeded by: Justin W. Ranney

Personal details
- Born: January 18, 1831 Randolph, Vermont, U.S.
- Died: March 31, 1902 (aged 71) Saint Paul, Minnesota, U.S.
- Resting place: Oakland Cemetery, Saint Paul
- Party: Republican; National Union (1860s)
- Spouse: Arabella A. Davis (m. 1855–1902)
- Children: William Brown Chandler^{(b. 1856; died 1856)}; Mary Eleanor (Linsley) (Eliot)^{(b. 1858; died 1914)}; Alice Ballard (Beringer)^{(b. 1860; died 1912)}; Laura Annette (Turner) (Forrest)^{(b. 1862; died 1920)}; Fannie Brown (Jackson)^{(b. 1863; died 1940)}; John Alonzo Chandler Jr.^{(b. 1865; died 1930)}; Anna Belle Chandler^{(b. 1867; died young)}; Paul Dillingham Chandler^{(b. 1873; died 1938)}
- Relatives: Julius Converse Chandler (brother); Albert Brown Chandler (brother); Moses M. Davis (cousin); Milan H. Sessions (brother-in-law)

Military service
- Allegiance: United States
- Branch/service: United States Volunteers (Union Army)
- Years of service: 1862
- Rank: Captain, USV
- Unit: 19th Reg. Wis. Vol. Infantry
- Battles/wars: American Civil War

John Alonzo Chandler Sr. (January 18, 1831 – March 31, 1902) was an American railroad agent, Republican politician, and pioneer of Wisconsin and Minnesota. He was a member of the Wisconsin Senate, representing La Crosse and Monroe counties during the 1865 and 1866 sessions. He is the namesake of Chandler, Minnesota.

== Biography ==
John A. Chandler was born January 18, 1831, at Randolph, Vermont. At age 15, he went to work in the offices of the Vermont Observer newspaper at Poultney, Vermont, and spent the next three years learning the printing trade there.

He was subsequently hired as foreman of the Green Mountain Freeman in Montpelier, Vermont, working for Daniel Pierce Thompson. During this time he also became involved in politics, and was hired as an assistant doorkeeper for the Vermont House of Representatives for the 1852 session. He then began studying law in the offices of Peter T. Washburn and Charles P. Marsh at Woodstock, Vermont, and was admitted to the bar in December 1853.

His older brother William had previously moved to Ohio and became involved in the railroad industry, and subsequently went to work as a locomotive operator for the new Milwaukee Road. Through this connection, Chandler was employed with the railroad. He went to live at Portage, Wisconsin, residing for several months with his cousin Moses M. Davis. When the Portage terminal opened, on March 17, 1857, Chandler was appointed cashier at that station, then the western terminus of the road.

While living at Portage, he collaborated with his brother, Julius Converse Chandler, to start the Portage Independent, a partisan Republican newspaper. John Chandler was only involved in the paper for nine months, however. He did remain involved in politics, and was one of the canvassers of elections in 1855. In this role, he came under scrutiny over the contested results of the 1855 Wisconsin gubernatorial election.

In 1858, Chandler moved further west to the new railroad terminus at Sparta, Wisconsin, and would remain there for 12 years. During his time in Sparta, he was also active in local and state politics. At the outbreak of the American Civil War, he helped to organize a company of volunteers for the Union Army and was commissioned captain of the company. His company was enrolled as Company C in the 19th Wisconsin Infantry Regiment. The regiment was initially assigned to guard Confederate prisoners in Madison, Wisconsin, but received orders in June 1862 to move east to Washington, D.C., where they were sent by ship to Fort Monroe in the Union enclave along the Virginia coast. Chandler resigned less than two months after the regiment's arrival at Fort Monroe.

Back in Sparta, Chandler was nominated for Wisconsin Senate in 1864, running on the National Union ticket. He won the election and represented La Crosse and Monroe counties in the State Senate during the 1865 and 1866 legislative sessions. He was offered renomination for another term in the State Senate in 1866, but declined, citing his business responsibilities.

In the Fall of 1870, Chandler was appointed the general freight agent for the railroad at the Saint Paul, Minnesota, terminal. Chandler would go on working at the Saint Paul terminal for the rest of his life.

He died on March 31, 1902, after suffering for several weeks with inflammatory rheumatism.

== Personal life and family ==
John A. Chandler was the 9th of 13 children born to William Brown Chandler and his wife Electa (née Owen). John Chandler was associated briefly with his younger brother Julius Converse "Shanghai" Chandler in the newspaper industry—Julius was a prolific and infamous Republican partisan newspaper editor in Wisconsin during the Civil War era. Their youngest brother, Albert Brown Chandler, was a telegrapher for President Abraham Lincoln and a pioneer in telegraph cryptography who went on to a long career as a telegraph corporate executive. John Chandler's older sister, Caroline, married Milan H. Sessions, who served in the Wisconsin Senate during the same terms as Chandler. The Chandlers were descended from the colonist William Chandler who came to the Massachusetts Bay Colony from England in 1637.

John A. Chandler married Arabella A. Davis of Warren, Vermont, on October 21, 1855. They had eight children together, though two died young.

The town of Chandler, Minnesota, was named for him.

Wisconsin Senate
Preceded by Angus Cameron	Member of the Wisconsin Senate from the 31st district January 2, 1865 – January 7, 1867	Succeeded by Justin W. Ranney
