= Wisconsin's 31st Senate district =

American legislative district in western Wisconsin

Wisconsin's 31st State Senate district
- 2024 map defined in 2023 Wisc. Act 94; 2022 map defined in Johnson v. Wisconsin Elections Commission; 2011 map was defined in 2011 Wisc. Act 43 composed of Assembly districts 91, 92, and 93
Senator
Jeff Smith; D–Eau Claire
since January 7, 2019 (7 years, 51 days)
- Demographics: 90.31% White; 1.51% Black; 2.14% Hispanic; 3.68% Asian; 1.62% Native American; 0.12% Hawaiian/Pacific Islander
- Population (2020) • Voting age: 178,440; 140,901
- Website: Official website
- Notes: Western Wisconsin

The 31st Senate district of Wisconsin is one of 33 districts in the Wisconsin Senate. Located in western Wisconsin, the district comprises all of Eau Claire County, southeast Dunn County, and parts of southern Chippewa County and northern Trempealeau County. It includes the cities of Eau Claire, Chippewa Falls, and Menomonie.

== Current elected officials ==
Jeff Smith is the senator representing the 31st district. He was first elected in 2018 general election. He previously served in the Wisconsin State Assembly from 2007 through 2011.

Each Wisconsin State Senate district is composed of three Wisconsin State Assembly districts. The 31st Senate district comprises the 91st, 92nd, and 93rd Assembly districts. The current representatives of those districts are:

- Assembly District 91: Jodi Emerson (D–Eau Claire)
- Assembly District 92: Clint Moses (R–Menomonie)
- Assembly District 93: Christian Phelps (D–Eau Claire)

The district is located almost entirely within Wisconsin's 3rd congressional district, which is represented by U.S. Representative Derrick Van Orden. The exception is one area of Chippewa County which falls within Wisconsin's 7th congressional district, represented by Tom Tiffany.

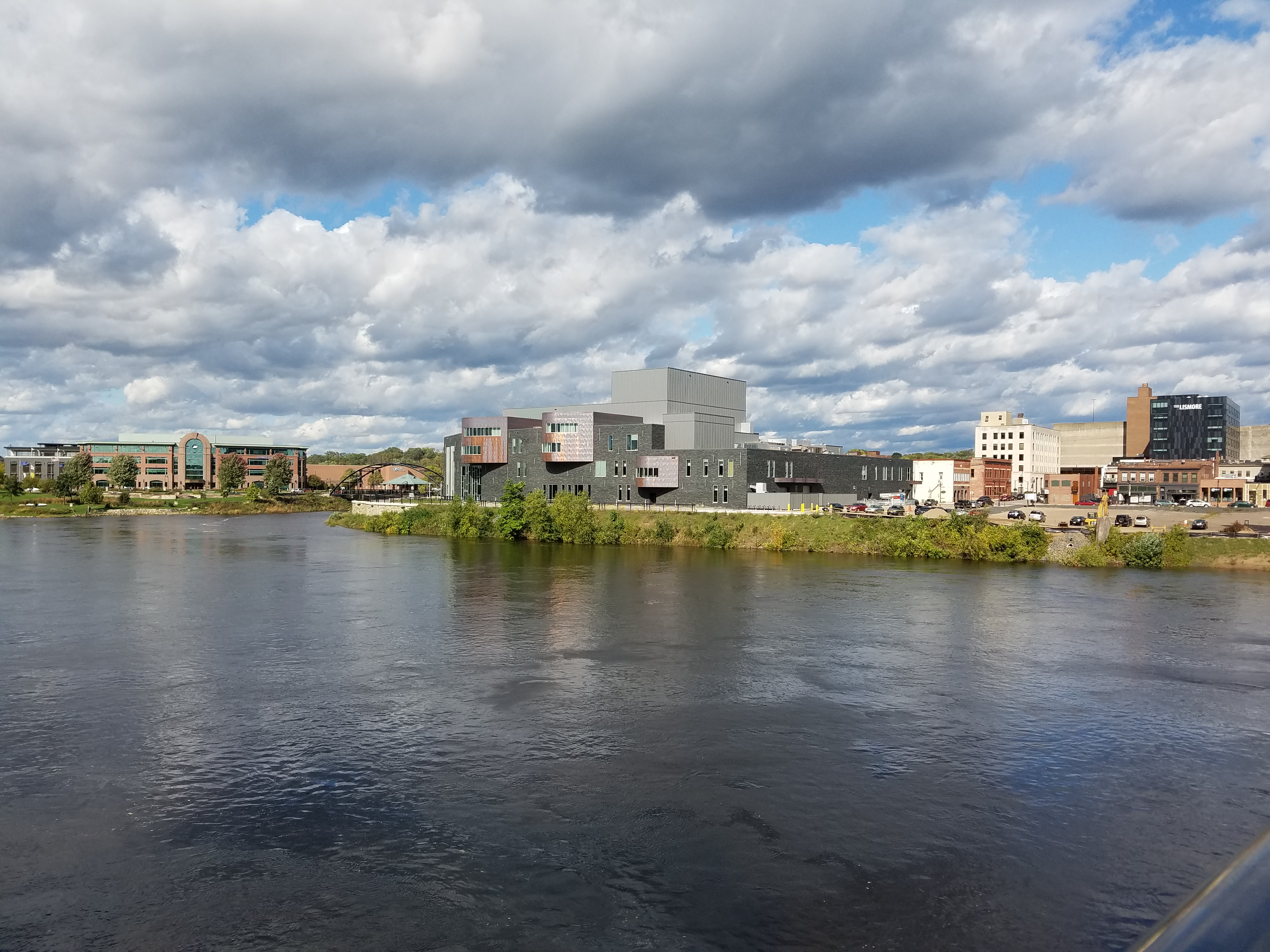
Downtown Eau Claire

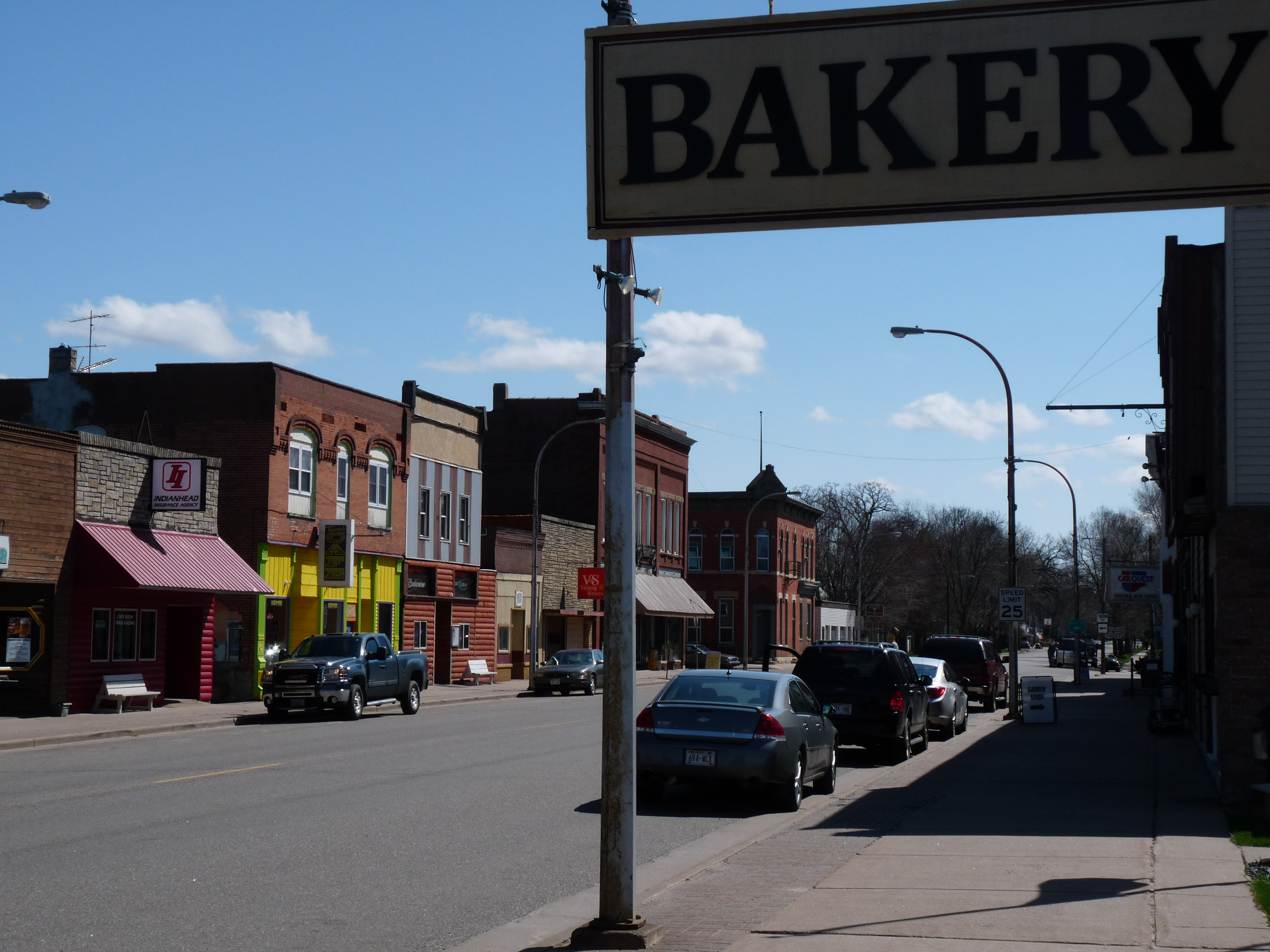
City of Augusta

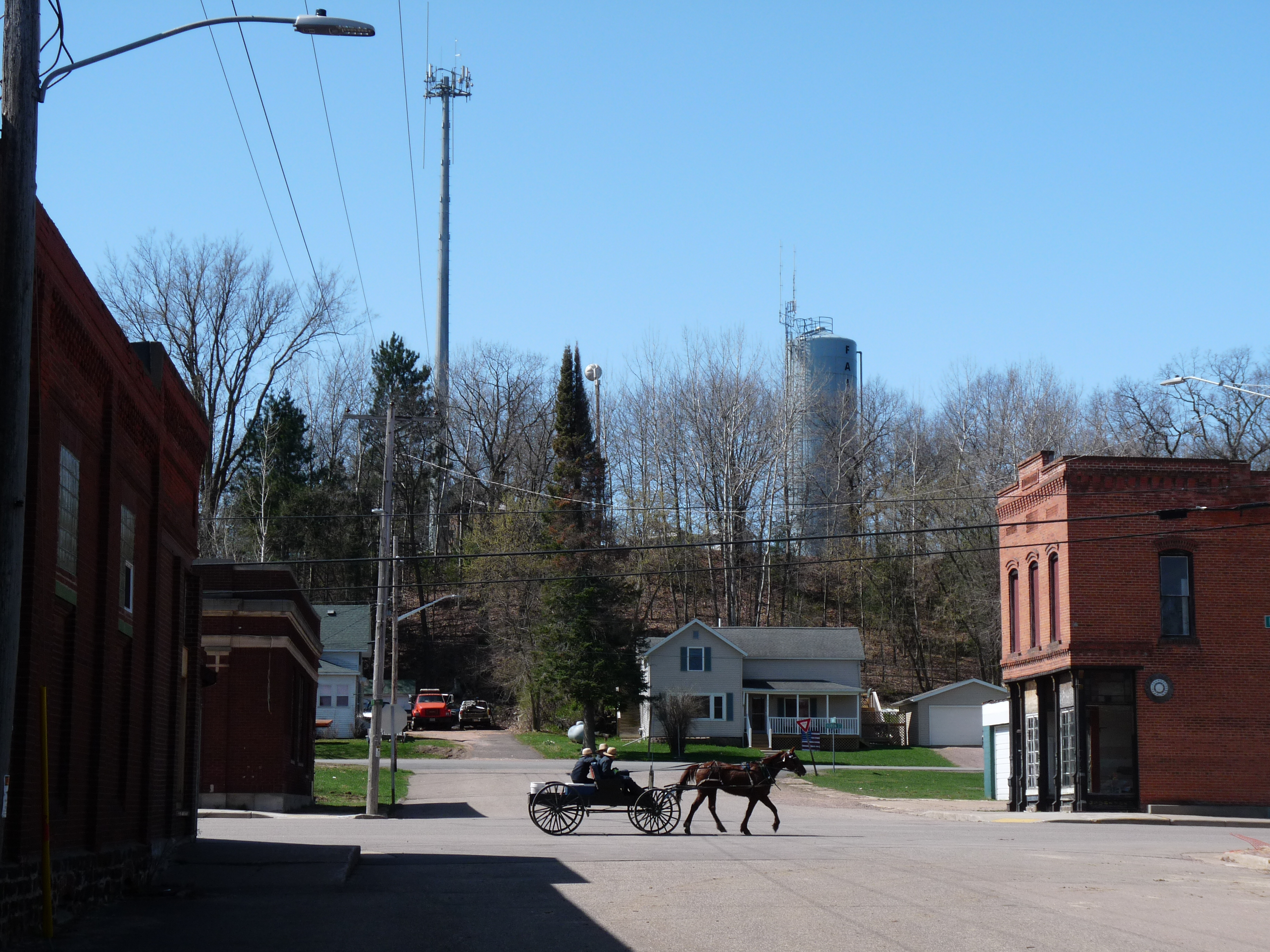
Village of Fairchild

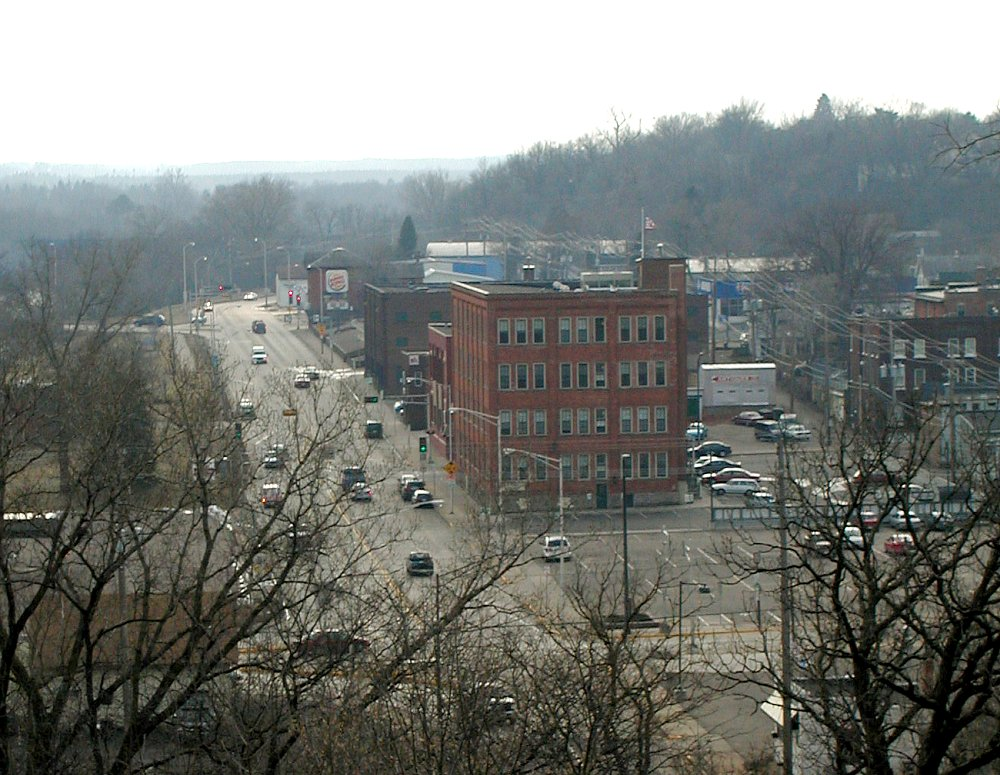
Downtown Chippewa Falls

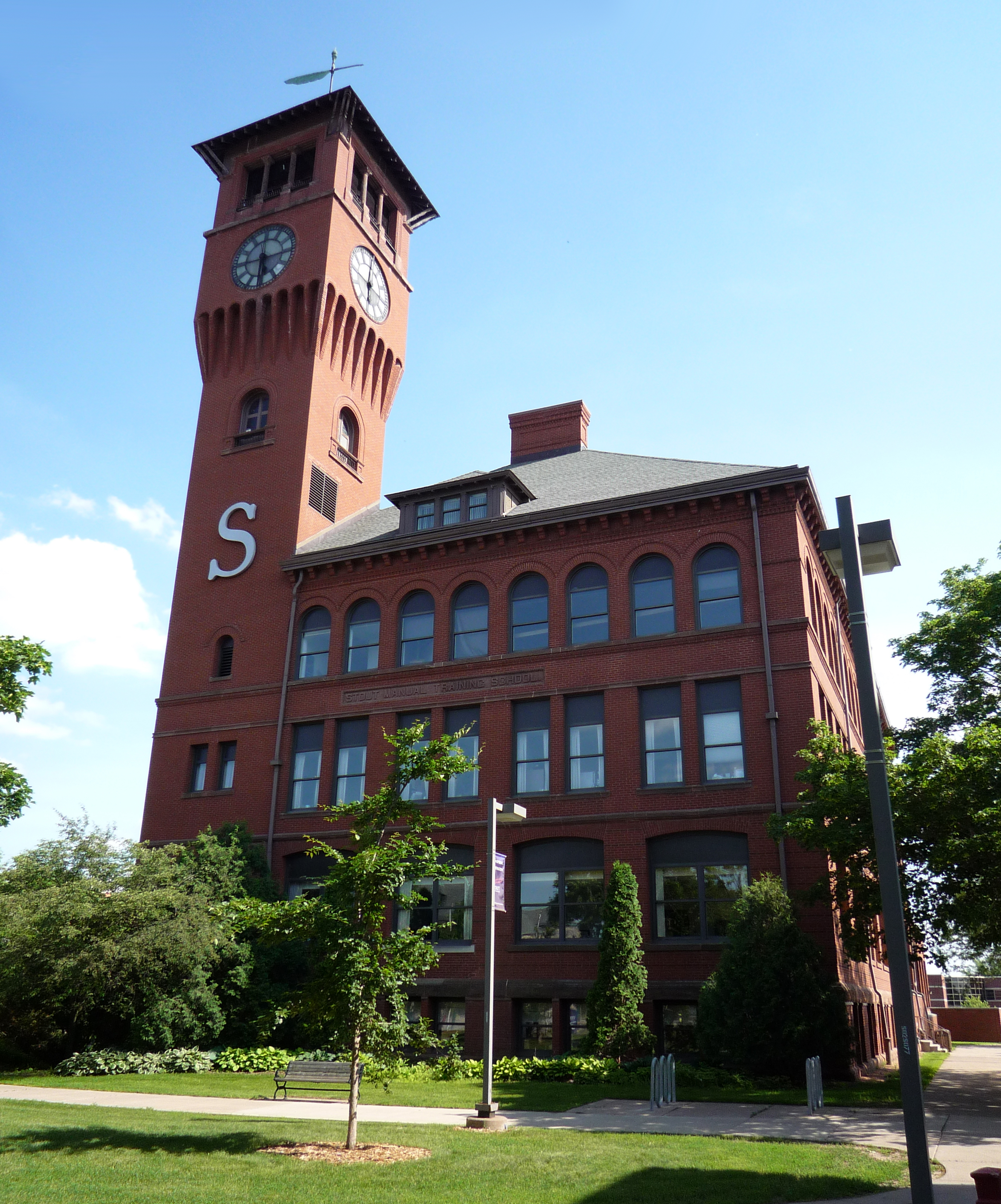
Bowman Hall on the UW–Stout campus

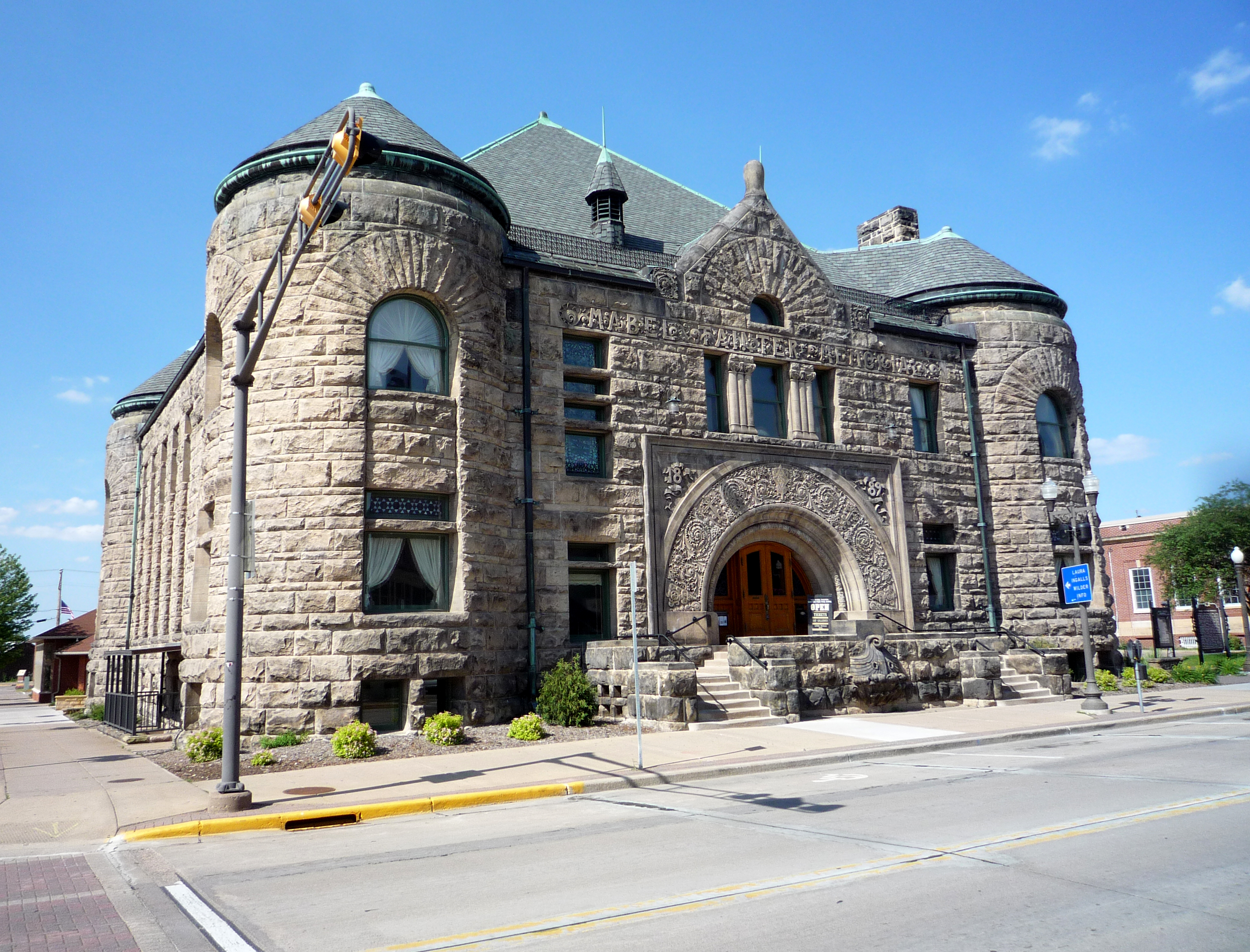
Mabel Tainter Memorial Building in Menomonie

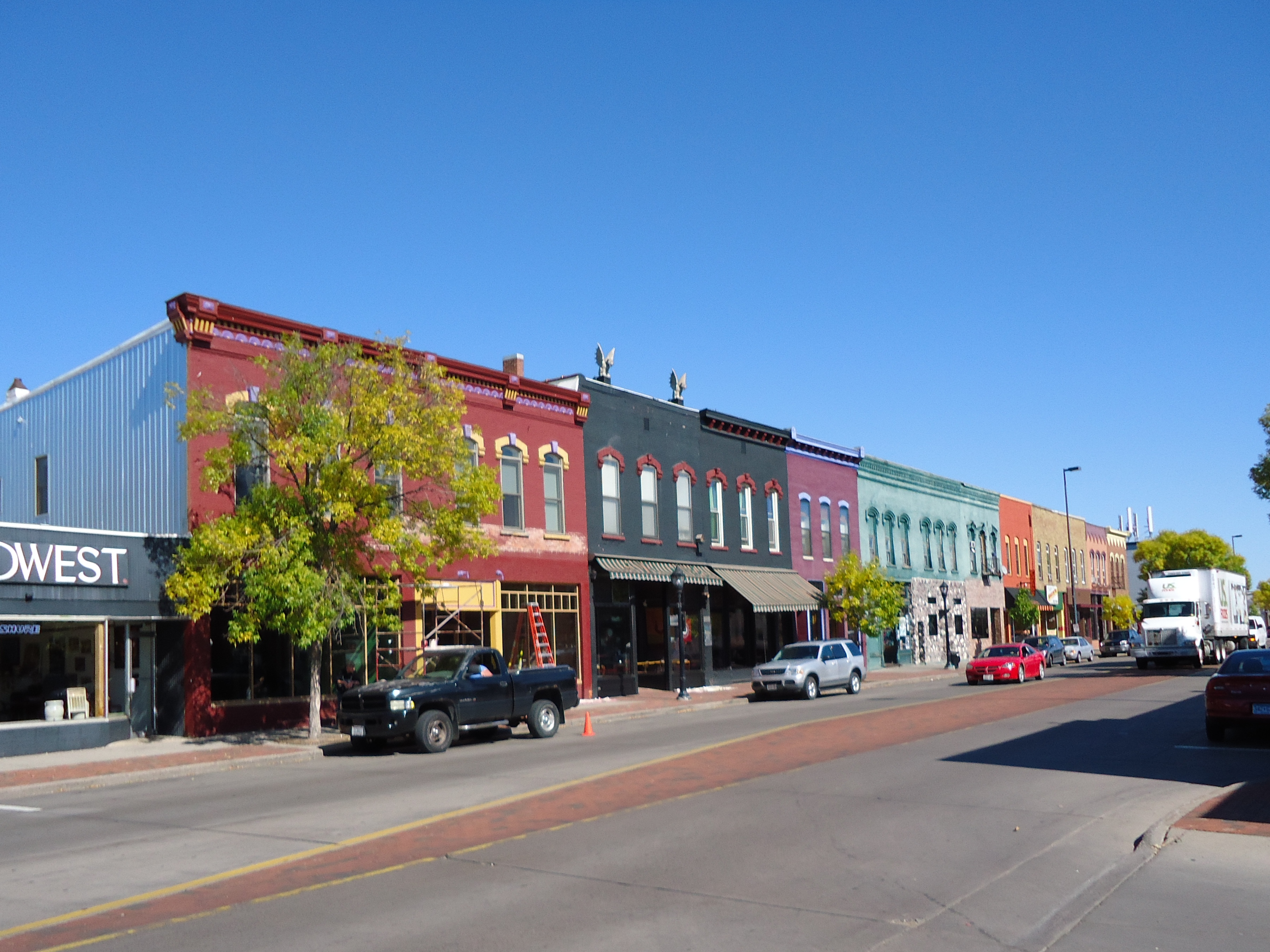
Water Street Historic District

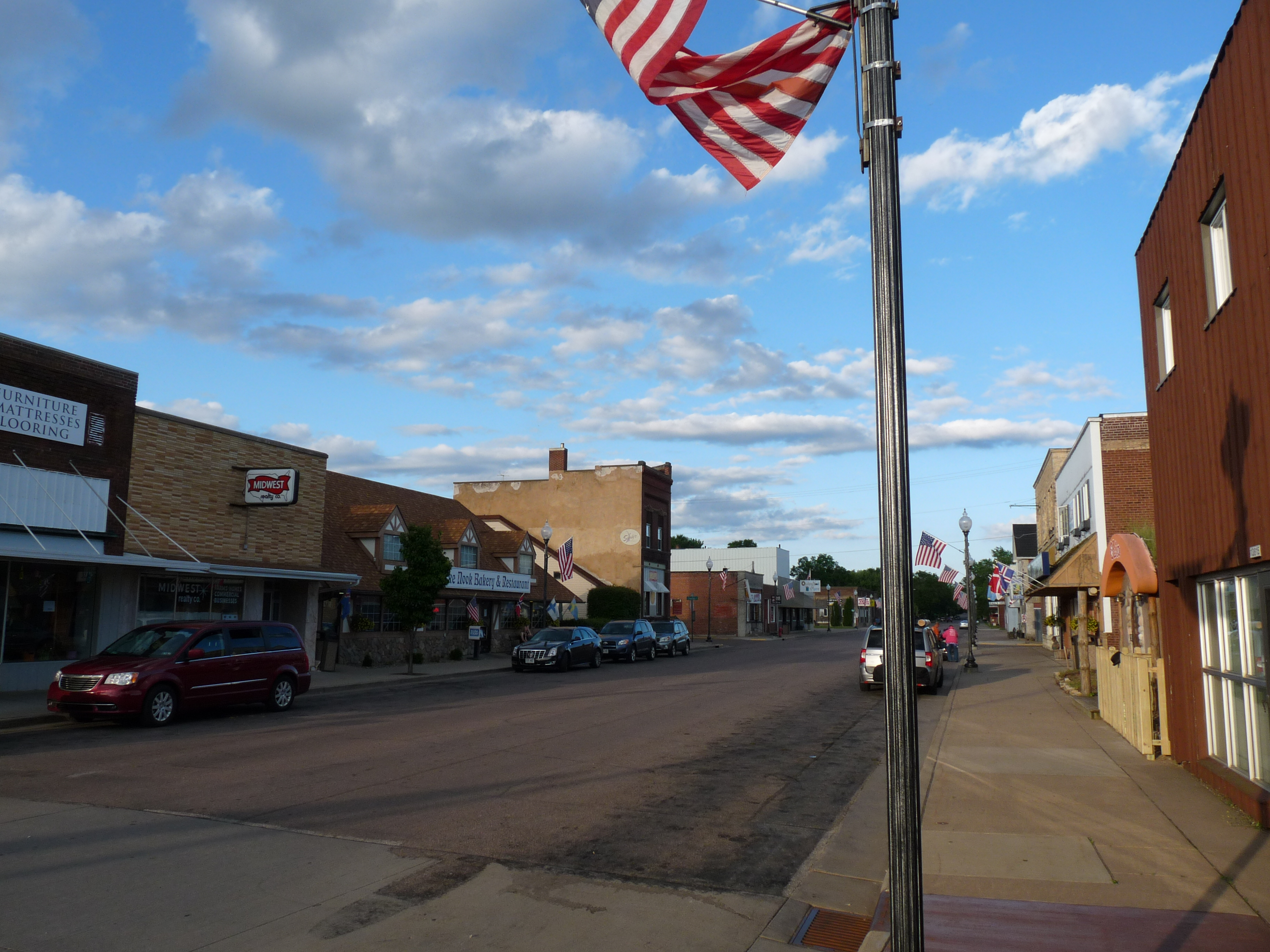
Downtown Osseo

== Past senators ==
Previous senators include:

Note: the boundaries of districts have changed repeatedly over history. Previous politicians of a specific numbered district have represented a completely different geographic area, due to redistricting.

Senator	Party	Notes	Session	Years	District Definition
District created by 1861 Wisc. Act 216.				1861	La Crosse and Monroe counties
Edwin Flint	Rep.		15th	1862	La Crosse and Monroe counties
Angus Cameron	Rep.		16th	1863	La Crosse and Monroe counties
Angus Cameron	Natl. Union		17th	1864	La Crosse and Monroe counties
John A. Chandler	Natl. Union		18th	1865	La Crosse and Monroe counties
John A. Chandler	Natl. Union		19th	1866	La Crosse and Monroe counties
Justin W. Ranney	Natl. Union		20th	1867	La Crosse and Vernon counties
Justin W. Ranney	Rep.		21st	1868	La Crosse and Vernon counties
Cyrus M. Butt	Rep.		22nd	1869	La Crosse and Vernon counties
Cyrus M. Butt	Rep.		23rd	1870	La Crosse and Vernon counties
Angus Cameron	Rep.		24th	1871	La Crosse and Vernon counties
Angus Cameron	Rep.		25th	1872	WI Senate District 31, 1872-1902 La Crosse County; 1870 population: 20,297; 1875 population: 23,945; 1880 population: 27,072
Gideon Hixon	Rep.		26th	1873	WI Senate District 31, 1872-1902 La Crosse County; 1870 population: 20,297; 1875 population: 23,945; 1880 population: 27,072
Gideon Hixon	Rep.		27th	1874	WI Senate District 31, 1872-1902 La Crosse County; 1870 population: 20,297; 1875 population: 23,945; 1880 population: 27,072
Sylvester Nevins	Rep.		28th	1875	WI Senate District 31, 1872-1902 La Crosse County; 1870 population: 20,297; 1875 population: 23,945; 1880 population: 27,072
Sylvester Nevins	Rep.		29th	1876	WI Senate District 31, 1872-1902 La Crosse County; 1870 population: 20,297; 1875 population: 23,945; 1880 population: 27,072
Merrick Wing	Rep.		30th	1877	WI Senate District 31, 1872-1902 La Crosse County; 1870 population: 20,297; 1875 population: 23,945; 1880 population: 27,072
Merrick Wing	Rep.		31st	1878	WI Senate District 31, 1872-1902 La Crosse County; 1870 population: 20,297; 1875 population: 23,945; 1880 population: 27,072
Gysbert Van Steenwyk	Rep.		32nd	1879	WI Senate District 31, 1872-1902 La Crosse County; 1870 population: 20,297; 1875 population: 23,945; 1880 population: 27,072
Gysbert Van Steenwyk	Rep.		33rd	1880	WI Senate District 31, 1872-1902 La Crosse County; 1870 population: 20,297; 1875 population: 23,945; 1880 population: 27,072
Merrick Wing	Rep.		34th	1881	WI Senate District 31, 1872-1902 La Crosse County; 1870 population: 20,297; 1875 population: 23,945; 1880 population: 27,072
Merrick Wing	Rep.		35th	1882	WI Senate District 31, 1872-1902 La Crosse County; 1870 population: 20,297; 1875 population: 23,945; 1880 population: 27,072
Donald A. McDonald	Dem.		36th	1883–1884	WI Senate District 31, 1872-1902 La Crosse County; 1870 population: 20,297; 1875 population: 23,945; 1880 population: 27,072
Donald A. McDonald	Dem.		37th	1885–1886	WI Senate District 31, 1872-1902 La Crosse County; 1870 population: 20,297; 1875 population: 23,945; 1880 population: 27,072
Thomas A. Dyson	Rep.		38th	1887–1888	WI Senate District 31, 1872-1902 La Crosse County; 1870 population: 20,297; 1875 population: 23,945; 1880 population: 27,072
Thomas A. Dyson	Rep.		39th	1889–1890	La Crosse and Vernon counties 1885 population: 34,791
Henry Conner	Dem.		40th	1891–1892	La Crosse and Vernon counties 1885 population: 34,791
Henry Conner	Dem.		41st	1893–1894	Jackson, Monroe, and Vernon counties 1890 population: 64,119
James J. McGillivray	Rep.		42nd	1895–1896	Jackson, Monroe, and Vernon counties 1890 population: 64,119
James J. McGillivray	Rep.		43rd	1897–1898	Jackson, Juneau, and Monroe counties 1895 population: 61,826; 1900 population: 66,198
James J. McGillivray	Rep.		44th	1899–1900	Jackson, Juneau, and Monroe counties 1895 population: 61,826; 1900 population: 66,198
James J. McGillivray	Rep.		45th	1901–1902	Jackson, Juneau, and Monroe counties 1895 population: 61,826; 1900 population: 66,198
James J. McGillivray	Rep.		46th	1903–1904	Jackson, Juneau, and Monroe counties 1895 population: 61,826; 1900 population: 66,198
James J. McGillivray	Rep.		47th	1905–1906	Jackson, Juneau, and Monroe counties 1895 population: 61,826; 1900 population: 66,198
H. W. Barker	Rep.		48th	1907–1908	Jackson, Juneau, and Monroe counties 1895 population: 61,826; 1900 population: 66,198
H. W. Barker	Rep.		49th	1909–1910	Jackson, Juneau, and Monroe counties 1895 population: 61,826; 1900 population: 66,198
Howard Teasdale	Rep.		50th	1911–1912	Jackson, Juneau, and Monroe counties 1895 population: 61,826; 1900 population: 66,198
Howard Teasdale	Rep.		51st	1913–1914	Jackson, Monroe, and Vernon counties 1910 population: 74,072
J. Henry Bennett	Rep.		52nd	1915–1916	Jackson, Monroe, and Vernon counties 1910 population: 74,072
J. Henry Bennett	Rep.		53rd	1917–1918	Jackson, Monroe, and Vernon counties 1910 population: 74,072
J. Henry Bennett	Rep.		54th	1919–1920	Jackson, Monroe, and Vernon counties 1910 population: 74,072
J. Henry Bennett	Rep.		55th	1921–1922	Jackson, Monroe, and Vernon counties 1910 population: 74,072
Howard Teasdale	Rep.		56th	1923–1924	Adams, Juneau, Monroe, and Marquette counties
Howard Teasdale	Rep.		57th	1925–1926	Adams, Juneau, Monroe, and Marquette counties
Howard Teasdale	Rep.		58th	1927–1928	Adams, Juneau, Monroe, and Marquette counties
Howard Teasdale	Rep.		59th	1929–1930	Adams, Juneau, Monroe, and Marquette counties
Orland S. Loomis	Rep.		60th	1931–1932	Adams, Juneau, Monroe, and Marquette counties
Orland S. Loomis	Rep.		61st	1933–1934	Adams, Juneau, Monroe, and Marquette counties
James Earl Leverich	Prog.		62nd	1935–1936	Adams, Juneau, Monroe, and Marquette counties
James Earl Leverich	Prog.		63rd	1937–1938	Adams, Juneau, Monroe, and Marquette counties
Amrose B. Coller	Rep.		64th	1939–1940	Adams, Juneau, Monroe, and Marquette counties
Amrose B. Coller	Rep.		65th	1941–1942	Adams, Juneau, Monroe, and Marquette counties
James Earl Leverich	Prog.		66th	1943–1944	Adams, Juneau, Monroe, and Marquette counties
James Earl Leverich	Prog.		67th	1945–1946	Adams, Juneau, Monroe, and Marquette counties
James Earl Leverich	Rep.		68th	1947–1948	Adams, Juneau, Monroe, and Marquette counties
James Earl Leverich	Rep.		69th	1949–1950	Adams, Juneau, Monroe, and Marquette counties
James Earl Leverich	Rep.		70th	1951–1952	Adams, Juneau, Monroe, and Marquette counties
James Earl Leverich	Rep.		71st	1953–1954	Adams, Juneau, Monroe, and Marquette counties
James Earl Leverich	Rep.		72nd	1955–1956	Adams, Juneau, Monroe, Marquette, and Vernon counties 1950 population: 94,959
James Earl Leverich	Rep.		73rd	1957–1958	Adams, Juneau, Monroe, Marquette, and Vernon counties 1950 population: 94,959
James Earl Leverich	Rep.		74th	1959–1960	Adams, Juneau, Monroe, Marquette, and Vernon counties 1950 population: 94,959
James Earl Leverich	Rep.		75th	1961–1962	Adams, Juneau, Monroe, Marquette, and Vernon counties 1950 population: 94,959
James Earl Leverich	Rep.		76th	1963–1964	Adams, Juneau, Monroe, Marquette, and Vernon counties 1950 population: 94,959
James Earl Leverich	Rep.		77th	1965–1966	Eau Claire, Jackson, Monroe, and Trempealeau counties
Raymond C. Johnson	Rep.		78th	1967–1968	Eau Claire, Jackson, Monroe, and Trempealeau counties
Raymond C. Johnson	Rep.		79th	1969–1970	Eau Claire, Jackson, Monroe, and Trempealeau counties
Raymond C. Johnson	Rep.		80th	1971–1972	Eau Claire, Jackson, Monroe, and Trempealeau counties
Raymond C. Johnson	Rep.		81st	1973–1974	Most of Clark County; Most of Eau Claire County; Most of Jackson County; Most of Monroe County; Northern Juneau County; Northern Adams County; Northern Jackson County; Northern Trempealeau County; Southwest Wood County; Part of Waushara County
Thomas Harnisch	Dem.		82nd	1975–1976	Most of Clark County; Most of Eau Claire County; Most of Jackson County; Most of Monroe County; Northern Juneau County; Northern Adams County; Northern Jackson County; Northern Trempealeau County; Southwest Wood County; Part of Waushara County
Thomas Harnisch	Dem.		83rd	1977–1978	Most of Clark County; Most of Eau Claire County; Most of Jackson County; Most of Monroe County; Northern Juneau County; Northern Adams County; Northern Jackson County; Northern Trempealeau County; Southwest Wood County; Part of Waushara County
Thomas Harnisch	Dem.		84th	1979–1980	Most of Clark County; Most of Eau Claire County; Most of Jackson County; Most of Monroe County; Northern Juneau County; Northern Adams County; Northern Jackson County; Northern Trempealeau County; Southwest Wood County; Part of Waushara County
Thomas Harnisch	Dem.		85th	1981–1982	Most of Clark County; Most of Eau Claire County; Most of Jackson County; Most of Monroe County; Northern Juneau County; Northern Adams County; Northern Jackson County; Northern Trempealeau County; Southwest Wood County; Part of Waushara County
Rodney C. Moen	Dem.		86th	1983–1984	Buffalo, Jackson, Pepin, and Trempealeau counties Most of Eau Claire County; Most of Monroe County
Rodney C. Moen	Dem.		87th	1985–1986	Buffalo, Jackson, Pepin, and Trempealeau counties Most of Eau Claire County; Northern Monroe County; Part of Clark County
Rodney C. Moen	Dem.		88th	1987–1988	Buffalo, Jackson, Pepin, and Trempealeau counties Most of Eau Claire County; Northern Monroe County; Part of Clark County
Rodney C. Moen	Dem.		89th	1989–1990	Buffalo, Jackson, Pepin, and Trempealeau counties Most of Eau Claire County; Northern Monroe County; Part of Clark County
Rodney C. Moen	Dem.		90th	1991–1992	Buffalo, Jackson, Pepin, and Trempealeau counties Most of Eau Claire County; Northern Monroe County; Part of Clark County
Rodney C. Moen	Dem.		91st	1993–1994	Buffalo, Jackson, Pepin, and Trempealeau counties Most of Monroe County; Parts of Eau Claire County
Rodney C. Moen	Dem.		92nd	1995–1996	Buffalo, Jackson, Pepin, and Trempealeau counties Most of Monroe County; Parts of Eau Claire County
Rodney C. Moen	Dem.		93rd	1997–1998	Buffalo, Jackson, Pepin, and Trempealeau counties Most of Monroe County; Parts of Eau Claire County
Rodney C. Moen	Dem.		94th	1999–2000	Buffalo, Jackson, Pepin, and Trempealeau counties Most of Monroe County; Parts of Eau Claire County
Rodney C. Moen	Dem.		95th	2001–2002	Buffalo, Jackson, Pepin, and Trempealeau counties Most of Monroe County; Parts of Eau Claire County
Ron Brown	Rep.		96th	2003–2004	Buffalo, Jackson, Pepin, and Trempealeau counties Most of Eau Claire County; Eastern Pierce County; Northern Monroe County; Southern Dunn County; Part of Clark County
Ron Brown	Rep.		97th	2005–2006	Buffalo, Jackson, Pepin, and Trempealeau counties Most of Eau Claire County; Eastern Pierce County; Northern Monroe County; Southern Dunn County; Part of Clark County
Kathleen Vinehout	Dem.		98th	2007–2008	Buffalo, Jackson, Pepin, and Trempealeau counties Most of Eau Claire County; Eastern Pierce County; Northern Monroe County; Southern Dunn County; Part of Clark County
Kathleen Vinehout	Dem.		99th	2009–2010	Buffalo, Jackson, Pepin, and Trempealeau counties Most of Eau Claire County; Eastern Pierce County; Northern Monroe County; Southern Dunn County; Part of Clark County
Kathleen Vinehout	Dem.		100th	2011–2012	Buffalo, Jackson, Pepin, and Trempealeau counties Most of Eau Claire County; Eastern Pierce County; Northern Monroe County; Southern Dunn County; Part of Clark County
Kathleen Vinehout	Dem.		101st	2013–2014	Buffalo and Pepin counties and Most of Pierce County; Most of Trempealeau County; Western Eau Claire County; Southern Dunn County; Western Jackson County
Kathleen Vinehout	Dem.		102nd	2015–2016	Buffalo and Pepin counties and Most of Pierce County; Most of Trempealeau County; Western Eau Claire County; Southern Dunn County; Western Jackson County
Kathleen Vinehout	Dem.		103rd	2017–2018	Buffalo and Pepin counties and Most of Pierce County; Most of Trempealeau County; Western Eau Claire County; Southern Dunn County; Western Jackson County
Jeff Smith	Dem.		104th	2019–2020	Buffalo and Pepin counties and Most of Pierce County; Most of Trempealeau County; Western Eau Claire County; Southern Dunn County; Western Jackson County
Jeff Smith	Dem.		105th	2021–2022	Buffalo and Pepin counties and Most of Pierce County; Most of Trempealeau County; Western Eau Claire County; Southern Dunn County; Western Jackson County
Jeff Smith	Dem.		106th	2023–2024	Buffalo, Pepin, Trempealeau counties and most of Pierce County, southern Dunn County, western Eau Claire County, western Jackson County
Jeff Smith	Dem.		107th	2025–2026	
