= James M. Reynolds =

American politician

James M. Reynolds (February 17, 1830 – April 19, 1899) was an American pioneer and politician.

Reynolds was born in 1830 just outside Dublin, Ireland. His family emigrated to the United States while he was an infant. They settled for a short time in New York City before moving to Michigan and later the town of Greenfield, Wisconsin. He was Catholic, and a Democrat.

After helping his family on their farm, Reynolds worked building the Janesville Plank Road. In 1849 and 1850, Reynolds traveled to San Francisco, California as part of the California Gold Rush. He returned to Wisconsin the next year, where he organized an 1852 expedition to move heards of horses and cattle to the fertile ground around Sacramento Valley. With the profits he purchased additional land in Sacramento and Salt Lake City. He embarked on additional expeditions in 1853 and 1854, bringing with him threshing machines and reapers.

Reynolds settled back in Milwaukee 1855 due to the ill health of his father. While living there he became involved in civic life. He was elected to the Wisconsin State Assembly as a Democrat in 1856 and 1868, and served as treasurer of Milwaukee County from 1864 to 1868.

Soon after, Reynolds and his family moved to Longton, Kansas, where they continued to raise cattle. He was elected to the Kansas House of Representatives in 1871. In 1874 he moved to Kansas City, Missouri, and worked in as a commission merchant. Losing his fortune, he moved to Chicago, Illinois where he again worked as a commission merchant, but also invested in Colorado mining and sheep. While still living in Chicago, he also worked on Wisconsin reclamation projects, including emptying swamps near Muskego and Wind Lake.

Reynolds died in Greenfield, Wisconsin, in April 1899.
