= Rufus Parks =

American politician

Rufus Parks (May 21, 1798 – September 17, 1878) was an American farmer, businessman, and politician.

Born in Westfield, Massachusetts, Parks went to Phillips Academy in Andover, Massachusetts. He was in the merchant business, law, and farming. After living in Maine and Massachusetts, he settled in Milwaukee, Wisconsin in 1836. In 1845, he moved to Summit in Waukesha County, Wisconsin. He served in the first Wisconsin Constitutional Convention of 1846. Parks also served in local government and was appointed superintendent of public property in 1858. Parks then served in the Wisconsin State Assembly in 1867. He died in Summit, Wisconsin, in Waukesha County.
