= Hamilton, Wisconsin =

- Town
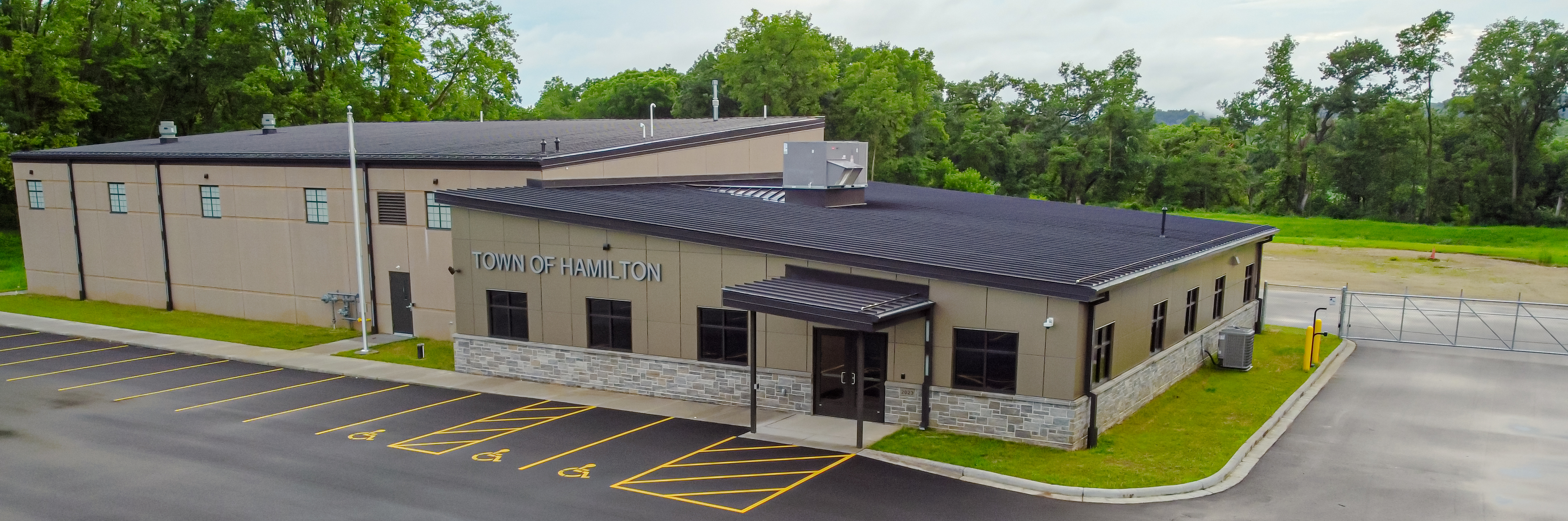
- Hamilton Town Hall

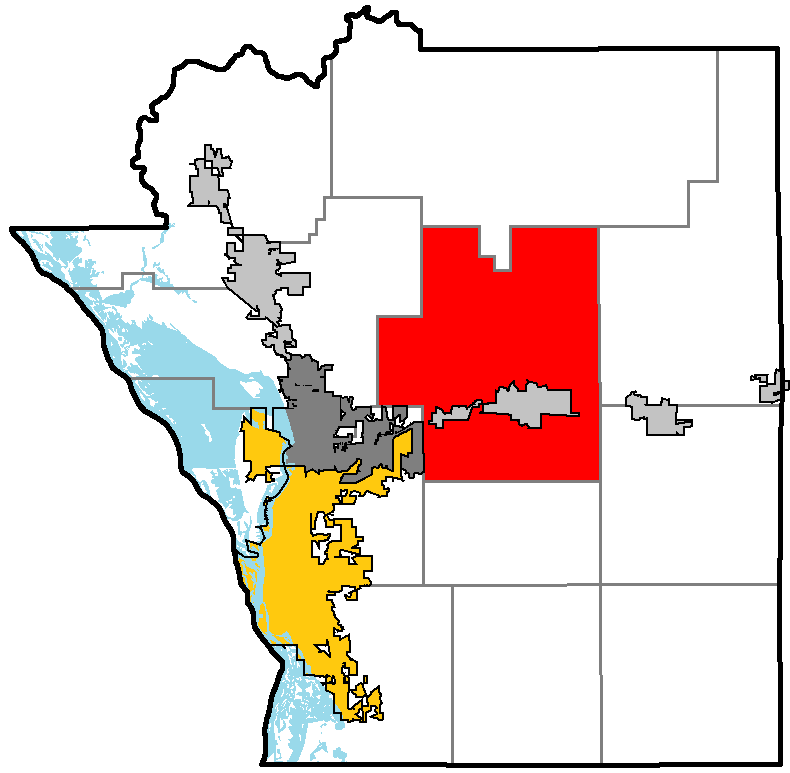
- Location of Hamilton, La Crosse County

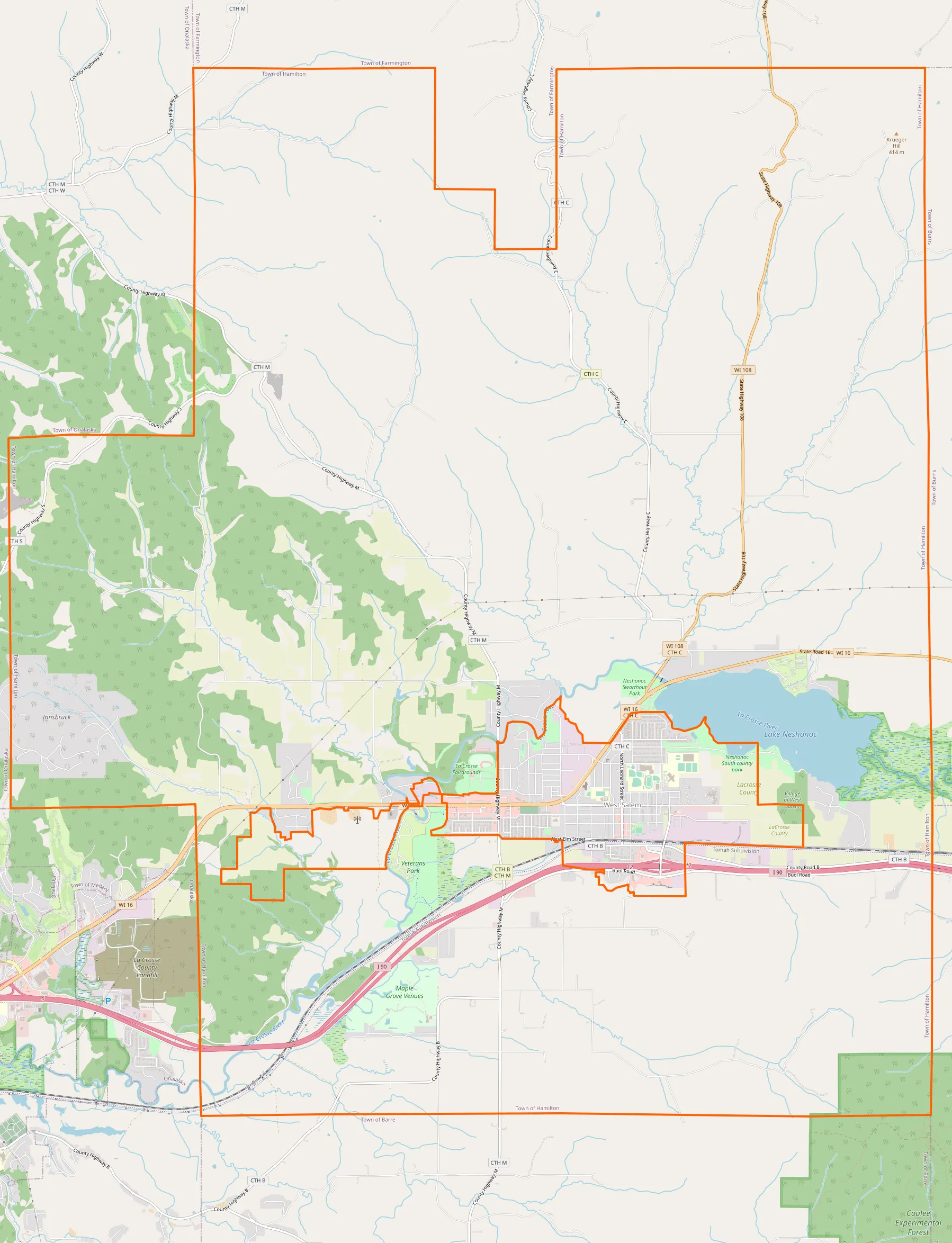
- Town limits
- Coordinates: 43°54′45″N 91°5′46″W
- Country: United States
- State: Wisconsin
- County: La Crosse

Area
  - Total: 51.1 sq mi (132.4 km^{2})
  - Land: 50.1 sq mi (129.7 km^{2})
  - Water: 1.0 sq mi (2.7 km^{2})
- Elevation: 741 ft (226 m)

Population (2020)
  - Total: 2,428
  - Density: 48.48/sq mi (18.72/km^{2})
- Time zone: UTC-6 (Central (CST))
  - Summer (DST): UTC-5 (CDT)
- Area code: 608
- FIPS code: 55-32275
- GNIS feature ID: 1583340
- Website: https://www.townofhamiltonwi.org/

Hamilton is a town in La Crosse County, Wisconsin, United States. The population was 2,428 as of the 2020 Census. It is part of the La Crosse, Wisconsin Metropolitan Statistical Area.

== History ==
The Town of Hamilton was named by John M. Coburn, after Hamilton College in Clinton, New York.

== Geography ==
According to the United States Census Bureau, the town has a total area of 51.1 square miles (132.4 km^{2}), of which 50.1 square miles (129.7 km^{2}) is land and 1.0 square mile (2.7 km^{2}) (2.03%) is water.

== Demographics ==
Historical population
Year	Pop.	±%
1990	2,149	—
2000	2,301	+7.1%
2010	2,561	+11.3%

As of the census of 2000, there were 2,301 people, 697 households, and 584 families residing in the town. The population density was 46.0 people per square mile (17.7/km^{2}). There were 732 housing units at an average density of 14.6 per square mile (5.6/km^{2}). The racial makeup of the town was 98.00% White, 0.26% African American, 0.39% Native American, 0.78% Asian, and 0.56% from two or more races. Hispanic or Latino of any race were 0.09% of the population.

There were 697 households, out of which 44.0% had children under the age of 18 living with them, 77.5% were married couples living together, 3.6% had a female householder with no husband present, and 16.1% were non-families. 9.8% of all households were made up of individuals, and 3.7% had someone living alone who was 65 years of age or older. The average household size was 3.02 and the average family size was 3.26.

In the town, the population was spread out, with 27.8% under the age of 18, 6.1% from 18 to 24, 27.5% from 25 to 44, 25.8% from 45 to 64, and 12.8% who were 65 years of age or older. The median age was 39 years. For every 100 females, there were 103.4 males. For every 100 females age 18 and over, there were 109.2 males.

The median income for a household in the town was $57,955, and the median income for a family was $59,792. Males had a median income of $36,917 versus $22,254 for females. The per capita income for the town was $20,142. About 1.4% of families and 2.1% of the population were below the poverty line, including 1.4% of those under age 18 and 5.7% of those age 65 or over.

== See also ==
- West Salem, Wisconsin
