= Edwin Hyde =

American politician

Edwin Hyde (8 June 1828 – 1909) was an American politician who served as a member of the Wisconsin State Assembly and the Wisconsin State Senate.

== Biography ==
Hyde was born on June 8, 1828, in Keinton, England. In 1857, Hyde moved to Chicago, Illinois. He moved to Milwaukee, Wisconsin, the following year.

== Career ==
Hyde was a member of the Assembly twice. First, from 1867 to 1868 and second, from 1877 to 1878. He was a member of the Senate from 1879 to 1880. Additionally, Hyde was a member of the Milwaukee Common Council and the Milwaukee County, Wisconsin Board of Supervisors. He was a Republican.
