= DeWitt C. Wilson =

American politician

DeWitt Clinton Wilson (May 14, 1827, in Wakeman, Ohio – August 26, 1895, in Mauston, Wisconsin) was a member of the Wisconsin State Assembly and the Wisconsin State Senate. From Sparta, Wisconsin, Wilson was a member of the Assembly in 1866 and of the Senate from 1867 to 1868. He was a Republican.
