= George S. Graves =

American politician

George S. Graves (May 18, 1820 – March 7, 1902) was a lawyer, businessman, and politician.

Born in Richfield, New York, Graves studied law in Lewis County, New York. In 1848, Graves moved to Sheboygan Falls, Wisconsin, where he practiced law. While living there, Graves served in the Wisconsin State Assembly from 1867 to 1869. In 1870, Graves moved to Fairchild, Wisconsin and was in the lumber business. He then moved to Eau Claire, Wisconsin. He died in Nevada, Missouri, where he had moved because of his health.
