= Ira Ford =

American politician from Wisconsin

Ira Hamilton Ford Sr. (June 11, 1827 – August 3, 1903) was a member of the Wisconsin State Assembly.

== Biography ==
Ford was born on June 11, 1827, in Granville, Vermont. He left in 1849 to take part in the California Gold Rush. In 1852, Ford moved to Columbia County, Wisconsin after being impressed with the area while visiting relatives. He died in Columbus, Wisconsin on August 3, 1903.

During the American Civil War, Ford served in the Union Army with 18th Wisconsin Volunteer Infantry Regiment, reaching the rank of captain. During the Battle of Shiloh, he was taken as a prisoner of war and held in various locations.

== Political career ==
Ford was a member of the Assembly from 1867 to 1868, succeeding Robert B. Sanderson. He was elected as a member of the National Union Party, which the Republican Party was known as at the time.
