= Ormsby B. Thomas =

19th century American congressman

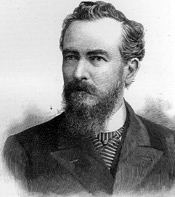

Chairman of the House Committee on War Claims
- In office March 4, 1889 – March 3, 1891
- Preceded by: William J. Stone
- Succeeded by: Frank Eckels Beltzhoover

Member of the U.S. House of Representatives from Wisconsin's 7th district
- In office March 4, 1885 – March 3, 1891
- Preceded by: Gilbert M. Woodward
- Succeeded by: Frank P. Coburn

Member of the Wisconsin Senate from the 4th district
- In office January 5, 1880 – January 2, 1882
- Preceded by: George W. Swain
- Succeeded by: Van S. Bennett

Member of the Wisconsin State Assembly from the Crawford district
- In office January 7, 1867 – January 6, 1868
- Preceded by: George F. Harrington
- Succeeded by: James Fisher
- In office January 2, 1865 – January 1, 1866
- Preceded by: Horace Beach
- Succeeded by: George F. Harrington
- In office January 6, 1862 – January 5, 1863
- Preceded by: Daniel Harris Johnson (Bad Ax–Crawford dist.)
- Succeeded by: James Fisher

District Attorney of Crawford County, Wisconsin
- In office January 2, 1899 – January 5, 1903
- Preceded by: Albert H. Long
- Succeeded by: W. R. Graves
- In office December 1867 – January 6, 1873
- Appointed by: Lucius Fairchild
- Preceded by: Joseph M. Wilcox
- Succeeded by: William Dutcher
- In office January 3, 1859 – January 5, 1863
- Preceded by: Buel Hutchinson
- Succeeded by: L. F. S. Viele

Personal details
- Born: August 21, 1832 Sandgate, Vermont, U.S.
- Died: October 24, 1904 (aged 72) Prairie du Chien, Wisconsin, U.S.
- Cause of death: Bright's disease
- Resting place: Evergreen Cemetery, Prairie du Chien, Wisconsin
- Party: Republican; Natl. Union (1862–1867); Democratic (before 1862)
- Spouse: Sarah E. Rosencrans (m. 1875; died 1884)
- Children: Pearl Thomas^{(b. 1876; died 1877)}; John Alexander Thomas^{(b. 1879; died 1954)}; Carrie Thomas^{(b. 1881; died after 1904)}
- Education: State and National Law School
- Profession: lawyer

Military service
- Allegiance: United States
- Branch/service: United States Volunteers; Union Army
- Years of service: 1862–1864
- Rank: Captain, USV
- Unit: 31st Reg. Wis. Vol. Infantry
- Battles/wars: American Civil War

Ormsby Brunson Thomas (August 21, 1832 – October 24, 1904) was an American lawyer, Republican politician, and Wisconsin pioneer. He was a member of the United States House of Representatives for three terms (1885–1891), representing Wisconsin's 7th congressional district. He also served five years in the Wisconsin Legislature and 13 years as district attorney of Crawford County, Wisconsin.

== Early life and career ==
Ormsby Thomas was born in Sandgate, Vermont, but moved to the Wisconsin Territory with his parents when he was a young child. His parents settled in Prairie du Chien, in Crawford County. After receiving his early education, he was sent to the Burr Seminary in Manchester, Vermont, for an academic education. He then graduated from the State and National Law School in Poughkeepsie, New York, in 1856. He was admitted to the bar in Albany, New York, that year. He returned to Prairie du Chien to establish his own law practice.

He became active in local politics and was elected district attorney of Crawford County in 1858, running on the Democratic Party ticket. He was subsequently re-elected in 1860.

== Civil War service ==
When the American Civil War started, in 1861, Thomas was the incumbent district attorney in Crawford County and was running for Wisconsin State Assembly. He was elected to represent Crawford County in the 1862 session of the Wisconsin Legislature.

After the end of the 1862 legislative session, Thomas went to work raising a company of volunteers for the Union Army from Crawford County. His company was enrolled as Company D in the 31st Wisconsin Infantry Regiment, and Thomas was formally commissioned captain in September 1862. For the first several months of their service, the regiment was solely tasked with training for battle, supervising conscription of draftees, and guarding Confederate prisoners of war at camps in Wisconsin. The regiment was reorganized at Racine, Wisconsin, in the winter of 1862–1863, and mustered into federal service.

They were sent to the western theater of the war and assigned to protecting supplies and logistics in Middle Tennessee through all of 1863. Thomas resigned his commission in January 1864 and returned to Wisconsin.

== Postbellum years ==
On returning to Wisconsin, Thomas was elected to another term in the Assembly, but was now running on the National Union Party ticket. This was a short-term alliance of Republicans and Pro-Union Democrats. Thomas served in the Union caucus in the 1865 session of the Legislature and remained associated with the Republican Party for the rest of his life. He was not a candidate for re-election in 1865, but was elected to another term in the Assembly in 1866.

After the legislative session in 1867, Governor Lucius Fairchild appointed Thomas to fill the vacant district attorney post in Crawford County, following the resignation of Joseph M. Wilcox. He served the remainder of Wilcox's term and was then elected to another term in 1868.

In 1869, he ran for Wisconsin State Senate in the 30th State Senate district, but was defeated by Democrat George Krouskop. He subsequently was elected to another term as district attorney in 1870. In 1872, he was a presidential elector for Ulysses S. Grant.

During the 1870s, Thomas was focused on his legal practice. He formed a partnership with Charles S. Fuller in 1876, which became a prominent and leading practice throughout the state. Fuller was later appointed a county judge in the 1880s.

Thomas resumed his political career in 1879, running for Wisconsin State Senate in the 4th State Senate district, which comprised Crawford County following the 1876 redistricting law. Thomas was easily elected running on the Republican ticket; he received 56% of the vote in a three-person race.

== Congressional career ==
Thomas did not run for re-election in 1881, and in 1882, he waged a campaign for nomination to Congress, from Wisconsin's 7th congressional district. His principal opponent was believed to be Gideon Hixon, who had the support of delegates from La Crosse County, but after 29 ballots at the Republican 7th district convention, the delegates broke in favor of Cyrus M. Butt, of Viroqua. Butt went on to lose the general election to Democrat Gilbert M. Woodward.

Two years later, Thomas made another run for congress. This time, he won the nomination on the first ballot at the convention. He went on to defeat Woodward in the general election with 52% of the vote. He was subsequently re-elected in 1886 and 1888, serving in the Forty-ninth, Fiftieth, and Fifty-first congresses. During the 51st Congress, Thomas was chairman of the House Committee on War Claims. He was defeated seeking a fourth term in 1890, in the wave election that saw Democrats claim 8 of Wisconsin's 9 congressional seats.

After leaving office, he resumed his legal career with his old partner, Judge C. S. Fuller. Fuller, however, committed suicide in 1897. In 1898, Thomas accepted the Republican nomination for another term as district attorney of Crawford County, and was elected in the Fall.

During his final term as district attorney, Thomas suffered from Bright's disease. His health continued to deteriorate after he left office in January 1903. He died at his home in Prairie du Chien on October 24, 1904. At the time of his death, he was described as the oldest member of the State Bar of Wisconsin.

== Personal life and family ==
Ormsby B. Thomas married Sarah E. Rosencrans at Prairie du Chien in June 1875. They had three children together before her death in 1884. Their first child, however, died in infancy.

== Electoral history ==
=== Wisconsin Senate (1869) ===
Wisconsin Senate, 30th District Election, 1869
Party	Candidate	Votes	%	±%
General Election, November 2, 1869
Democratic	George Krouskop	1,984	52.70%	
Republican	Ormsby B. Thomas	1,781	47.30%	
Plurality		203	5.39%	
Total votes		3,765	100.0%	
Democratic hold				

=== Wisconsin Senate (1879) ===
Wisconsin Senate, 4th District Election, 1879
Party	Candidate	Votes	%	±%
General Election, November 4, 1879
Republican	Ormsby B. Thomas	4,071	56.77%	−10.80%
Greenback	P. N. Peterson	1,656	23.09%	
Democratic	W. N. Carter	1,444	20.14%	−12.29%
Plurality		2,415	33.68%	-1.47%
Total votes		7,171	100.0%	+49.83%
Republican hold				

=== U.S. House of Representatives (1884–1890) ===
Year	Date	Elected				Defeated				Total	Plurality
1884	November 4	Ormsby B. Thomas	Republican	18,437	52.62%	Gilbert M. Woodward	Dem.	15,446	44.09%	35,035	2,991
1884	November 4	Ormsby B. Thomas	Republican	18,437	52.62%	S. B. Loomis	Proh.	1,147	3.27%	35,035	2,991
1886	November 2	Ormsby B. Thomas (inc)	Republican	16,720	54.24%	S. N. Dickenson	Dem.	11,917	38.66%	30,824	4,803
1886	November 2	Ormsby B. Thomas (inc)	Republican	16,720	54.24%	S. B. Loomis	Proh.	2,175	7.06%	30,824	4,803
1888	November 6	Ormsby B. Thomas (inc)	Republican	19,918	53.50%	Frank P. Coburn	Dem.	15,433	41.46%	37,228	4,485
1888	November 6	Ormsby B. Thomas (inc)	Republican	19,918	53.50%	J. H. Moseley	Proh.	1,871	5.03%	37,228	4,485
1890	November 4	Frank P. Coburn	Democratic	15,399	50.83%	Ormsby B. Thomas (inc)	Rep.	13,397	44.22%	37,228	4,485
1890	November 4	Frank P. Coburn	Democratic	15,399	50.83%	Sylvanus Holmes	Proh.	1,499	4.95%	37,228	4,485

Wisconsin State Assembly
Preceded by Daniel Harris Johnson (Bad Ax–Crawford district)	Member of the Wisconsin State Assembly from the Crawford district January 6, 1862 – January 5, 1863	Succeeded by James Fisher
Preceded by Horace Beach	Member of the Wisconsin State Assembly from the Crawford district January 2, 1865 – January 1, 1866	Succeeded by George F. Harrington
Preceded by George F. Harrington	Member of the Wisconsin State Assembly from the Crawford district January 7, 1867 – January 6, 1868	Succeeded by James Fisher
Wisconsin Senate
Preceded by George W. Swain	Member of the Wisconsin Senate from the 4th district January 5, 1880 – January 2, 1882	Succeeded by Van S. Bennett
U.S. House of Representatives
Preceded by Gilbert M. Woodward	Member of the U.S. House of Representatives from Wisconsin's 7th congressional district March 4, 1885 - March 3, 1891	Succeeded by Frank P. Coburn
Legal offices
Preceded by Buel Hutchinson	District Attorney of Crawford County, Wisconsin; January 3, 1859 – January 5, 1863	Succeeded by L. F. S. Viele
Preceded by Joseph M. Wilcox	District Attorney of Crawford County, Wisconsin; December 1867 – January 6, 1873	Succeeded by William Dutcher
Preceded by Albert H. Long	District Attorney of Crawford County, Wisconsin; January 2, 1899 – January 5, 1903	Succeeded by W. R. Graves
