= William H. Tucker (American politician) =

American politician (1825–1866)

Member of the Wisconsin Senate from the 30th district
- In office January 4, 1858 – January 2, 1860
- Preceded by: William T. Price
- Succeeded by: Buel Hutchinson

Personal details
- Born: April 22, 1825 Southampton County, Virginia, U.S.
- Died: February 3, 1866 (aged 40) Chicago, Illinois, U.S.
- Cause of death: Tuberculosis
- Resting place: Hamilton Cemetery, West Salem, Wisconsin
- Party: Democratic; Whig (before 1854)
- Spouse: Elizabeth Letitia Roosevelt (m. 1851–1866)
- Children: Edward Eugene Tucker^{(b. 1852; died 1925)}; Blanche Isabella Pauline Tucker^{(b. 1853; died 1898)}; Minnie Cecilia Francesca (Love)^{(b. 1856)}; Elizabeth Roosevelt Tucker^{(b. 1858; died 1860)}; Fannie Antoinette (Low)^{(b. 1859; died 1946)}
- Parents: Joseph Tucker (father); Mary (Myrick) Tucker (mother)
- Education: Oberlin College
- Profession: Lawyer

Military service
- Allegiance: United States
- Branch/service: United States Volunteers; Union Army
- Years of service: 1861–1862
- Rank: Captain, USV
- Unit: 19th Reg. Wis. Vol. Infantry
- Battles/wars: American Civil War

William Henry Tucker (April 22, 1825 – February 3, 1866) was an American lawyer, Democratic politician, and Wisconsin pioneer. He was a member of the Wisconsin Senate, representing a large district of then-sparsely populated western Wisconsin during the 1858 and 1859 sessions.

== Biography ==
William H. Tucker was born in Southampton County, Virginia, in April 1825.

He graduated from Oberlin College, and started his legal career in Sandusky, Ohio. He also became involved in politics in Ohio and ran for a seat in the Ohio House of Representatives on the Whig Party ticket in 1851.

Shortly after losing that election, Tucker left Ohio and settled in the new state of Wisconsin. He briefly resided in Milwaukee, before moving further west to the village of La Crosse, Wisconsin, in 1852. In La Crosse, he quickly became a prominent member of the bar.

When the city of La Crosse was incorporated in 1856, Tucker was elected as one of the first members of the city council, running on the Democratic Party ticket. The following year, he was elected to the La Crosse County board of supervisors, and that fall he announced that he would run for Wisconsin Senate.

Despite his previous affiliation with the Democratic Party, he declared he would run for Senate as an independent candidate. The Democratic Party still endorsed his campaign in their 1857 convention. Tucker defeated his Republican opponent, Edwin Flint, and went on to serve in the 1858 and 1859 legislative sessions, caucusing as a Democrat. At this time, his district—the 30th Senate district—comprised all of the territory of Buffalo, Crawford, Jackson, La Crosse, Monroe, Trempealeau, and Vernon counties. Tucker ran for re-election in 1859, but was defeated by Republican Buel Hutchinson.

Near the start of the American Civil War, Tucker volunteered for service with the Union Army and was commissioned captain of Company B in the 19th Wisconsin Infantry Regiment. The organization of the 19th Wisconsin Infantry began in November 1861, but at the time it was the only military unit in the state of Wisconsin, and was therefore placed on duty to guard Confederate prisoners at Camp Randall, in Madison, Wisconsin. They mustered into federal service the following April, and their prisoners were transferred to Chicago in May, after which the 19th finally left for the front. They arrived in the vicinity of Washington, D.C., on June 5, 1862, and were assigned to guard and provost duty in the Union-held enclave around Fort Monroe on the Virginia coast. Tucker resigned his commission in September 1862.

After returning from the war, Tucker became involved in the railroad business and was a member of the board of directors of the La Crosse, Viroqua & Mineral Point Railroad. He subsequently moved to Chicago, where he died of tuberculosis at the age of 40 on February 3, 1866.

== Personal life and family ==
Tucker married Elizabeth Letitia Roosevelt on April 22, 1851, in Sandusky, Ohio. She was a member of the Roosevelt family, a descendant of Claes Martenszen van Rosenvelt, who emigrated to the colony of New Netherland in about 1649. Tucker and his wife had five children, though one died in infancy.

His eldest daughter, Blanche, under the name Blanche Roosevelt, became an opera singer in the latter half of the 19th century, creating the role of Mabel in The Pirates of Penzance by Gilbert and Sullivan.

Another daughter, Minnie C. T. Love, was a prominent physician and suffragist in Denver, Colorado. She was elected to the Colorado House of Representatives in the 1920s, shortly after the passage of the 19th Amendment. She was also involved with the Women of the Ku Klux Klan.

Wisconsin Senate
Preceded by William T. Price	Member of the Wisconsin Senate from the 30th district January 4, 1858 – January 2, 1860	Succeeded by Buel Hutchinson
