= Senator Ketcham =

Senator Ketcham may refer to:

- John H. Ketcham (1832–1906), New York State Senate
- Winthrop Welles Ketcham (1820–1879), Pennsylvania State Senate
- William Ketcham (1819–1879), Wisconsin State Senate
