= Wisconsin's 30th Senate district =

American legislative district for Green Bay, Wisconsin

Wisconsin's 30th State Senate district
- 2024 map defined in 2023 Wisc. Act 94; 2022 map defined in Johnson v. Wisconsin Elections Commission; 2011 map was defined in 2011 Wisc. Act 43 composed of Assembly districts 88, 89, and 90
Senator
Jamie Wall; D–Green Bay
since January 6, 2025 (1 year, 52 days)
- Demographics: 77.1% White; 4.65% Black; 10.42% Hispanic; 3.71% Asian; 4.38% Native American; 0.14% Hawaiian/Pacific Islander
- Population (2020) • Voting age: 179,103; 138,446
- Website: Official website
- Notes: Green Bay metro area

The 30th Senate district of Wisconsin is one of 33 districts in the Wisconsin Senate. Located in northeast Wisconsin, the district consists of the urban core of Brown County. It includes most of the city of Green Bay, along with the city of De Pere and the villages of Allouez, Ashwaubenon, and Bellevue.

== Current elected officials ==
Jamie Wall is the senator representing the 30th district. He was first elected to the senate in the 2024 general election.

Each Wisconsin State Senate district is composed of three Wisconsin State Assembly districts. The 30th Senate district comprises the 88th, 89th, and 90th Assembly districts. The current representatives of those districts are:

- Assembly District 88: Ben Franklin (R–De Pere)
- Assembly District 89: Ryan Spaude (D–Ashwaubenon)
- Assembly District 90: Amaad Rivera-Wagner (D–Green Bay)

The district is located entirely within Wisconsin's 8th congressional district, which is represented by U.S. Representative Tony Wied.

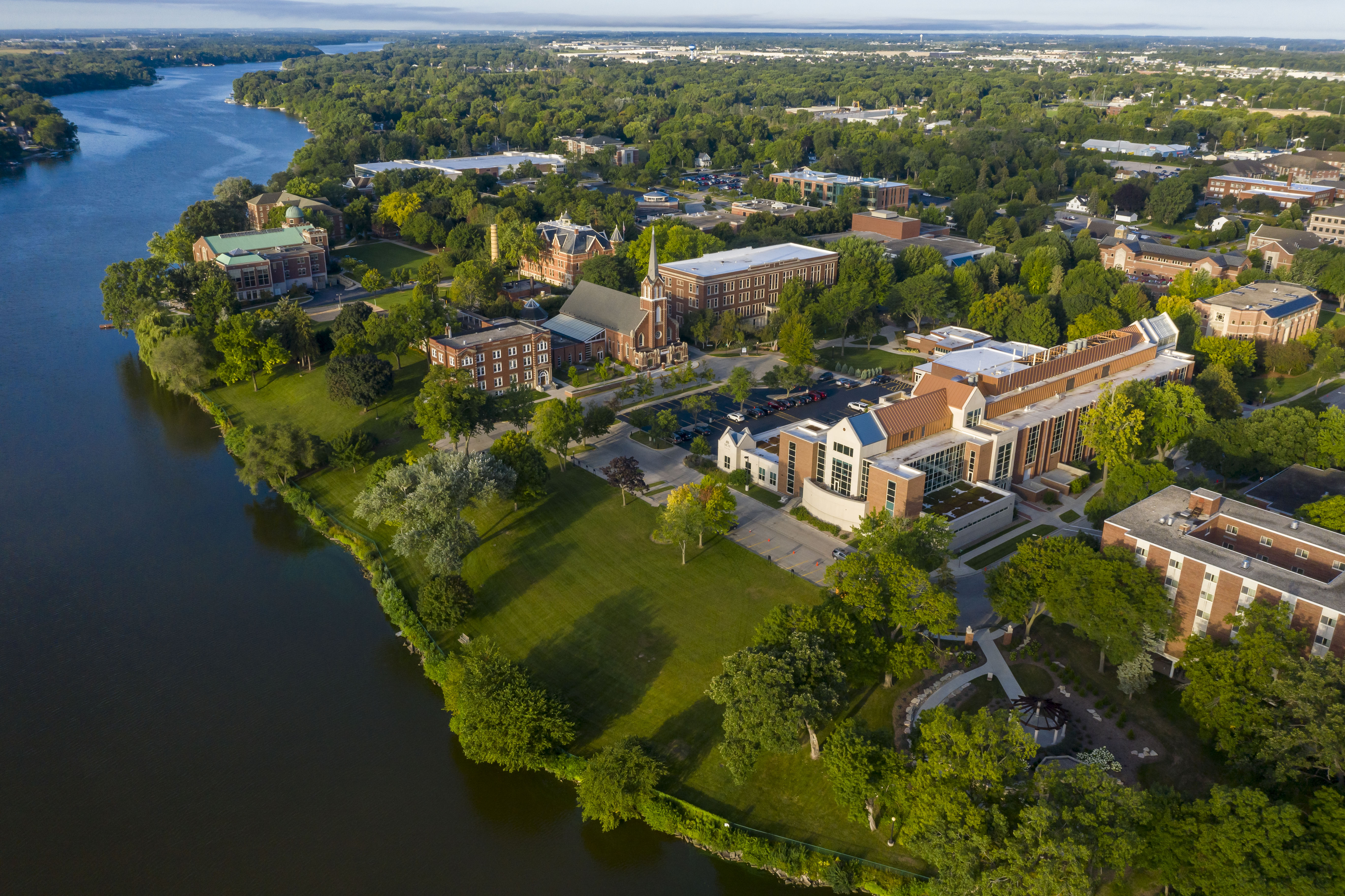
St. Norbert College

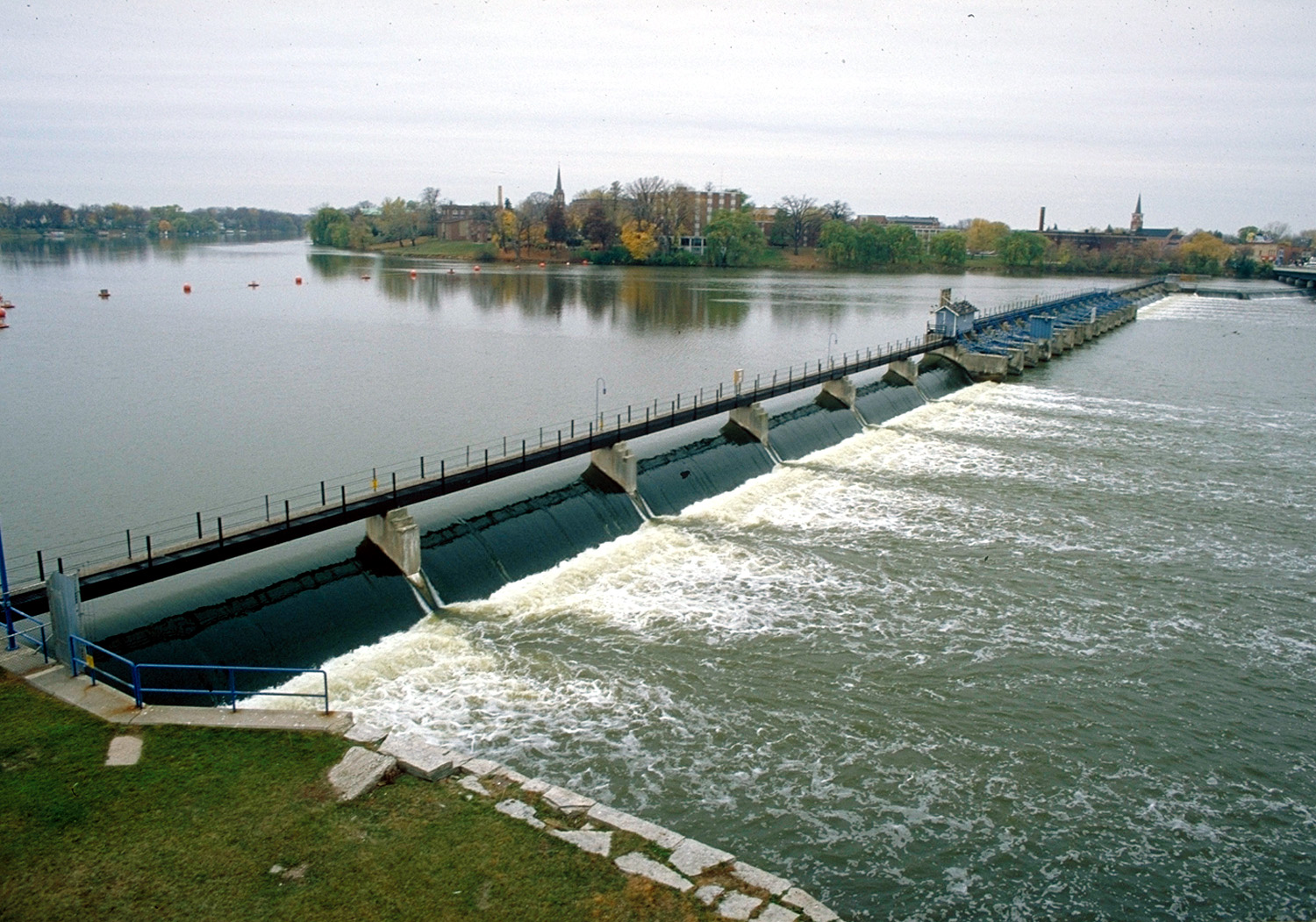
De Pere Dam on the Fox River

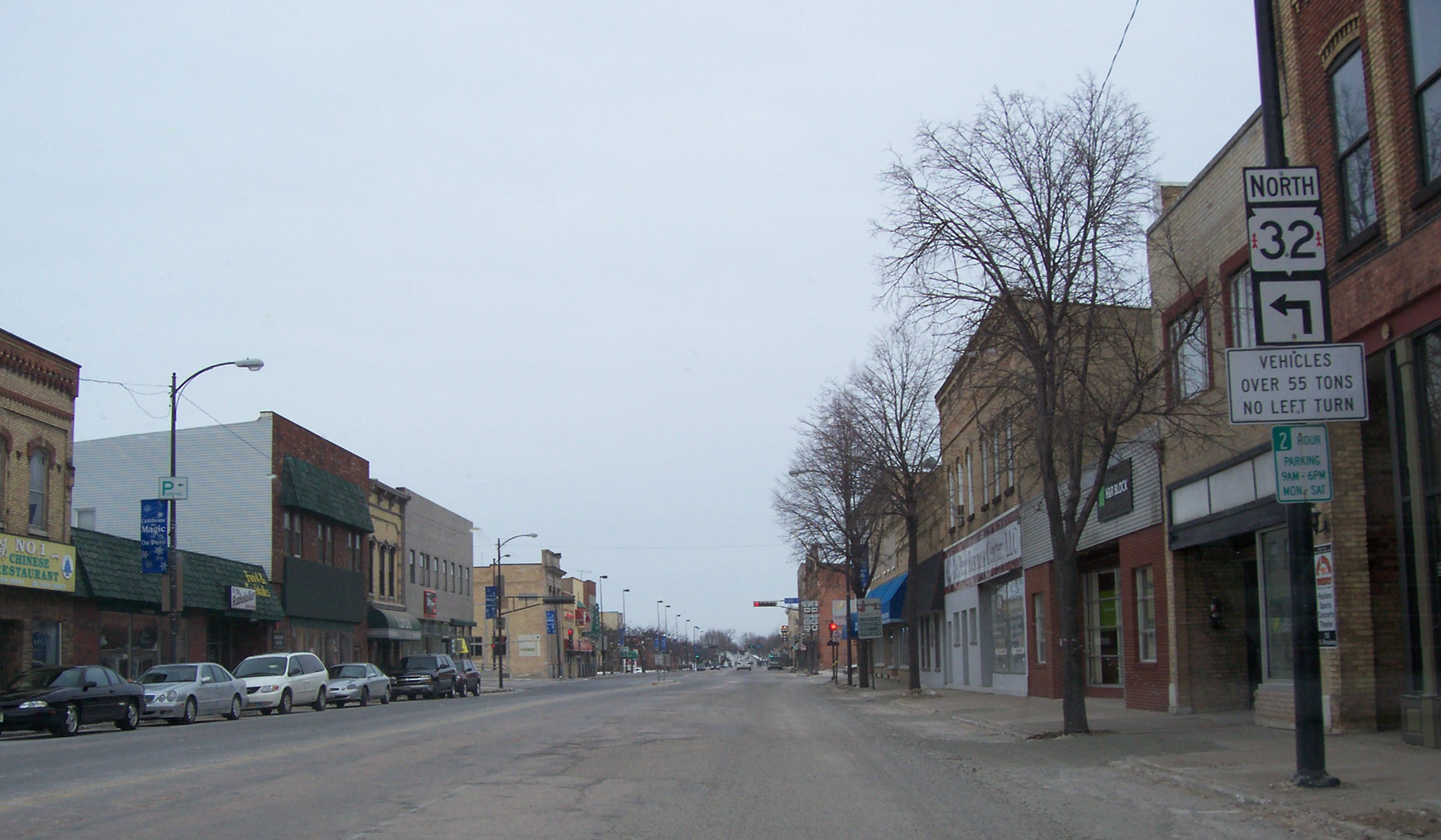
Downtown De Pere

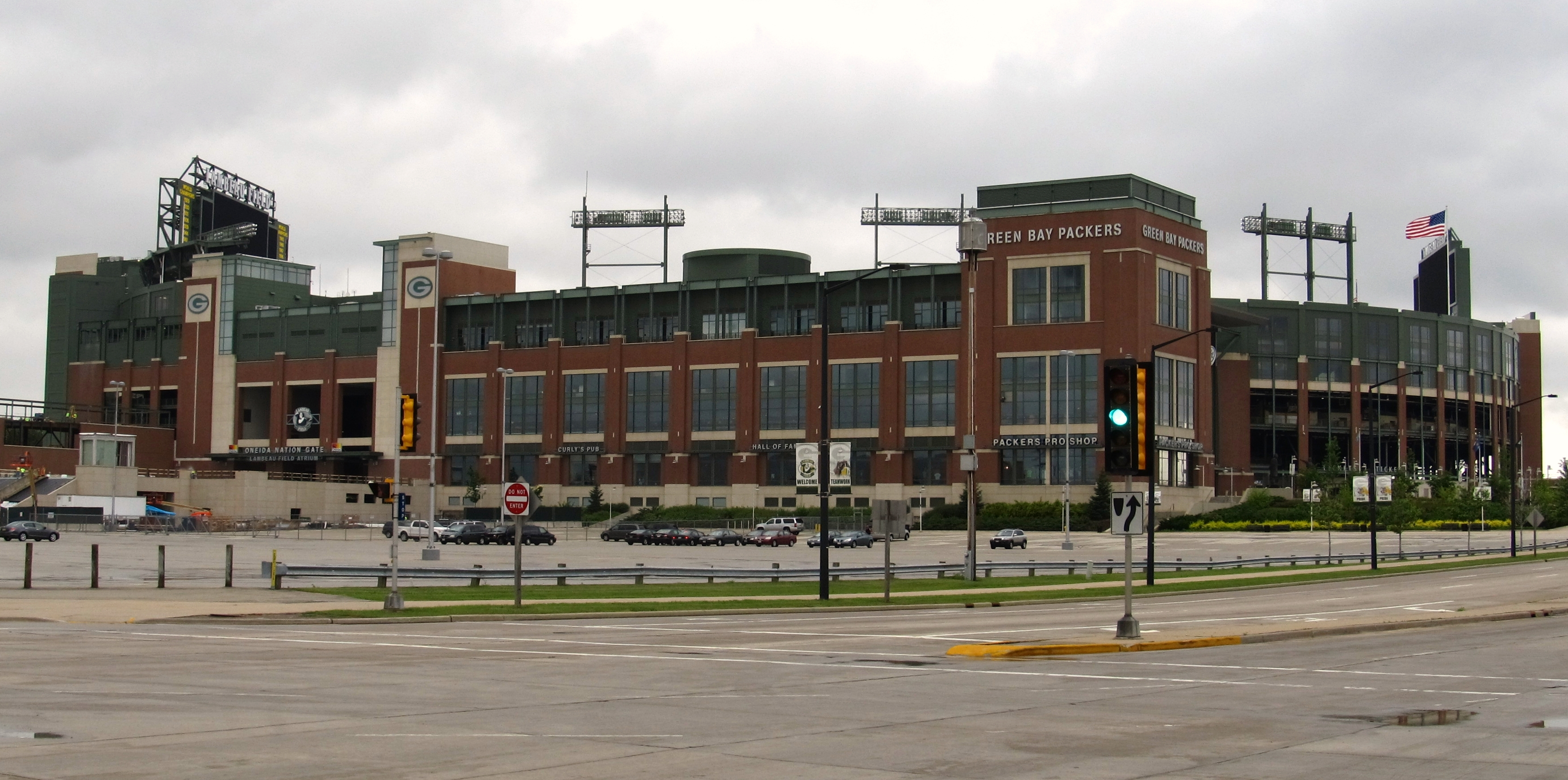
Lambeau Field

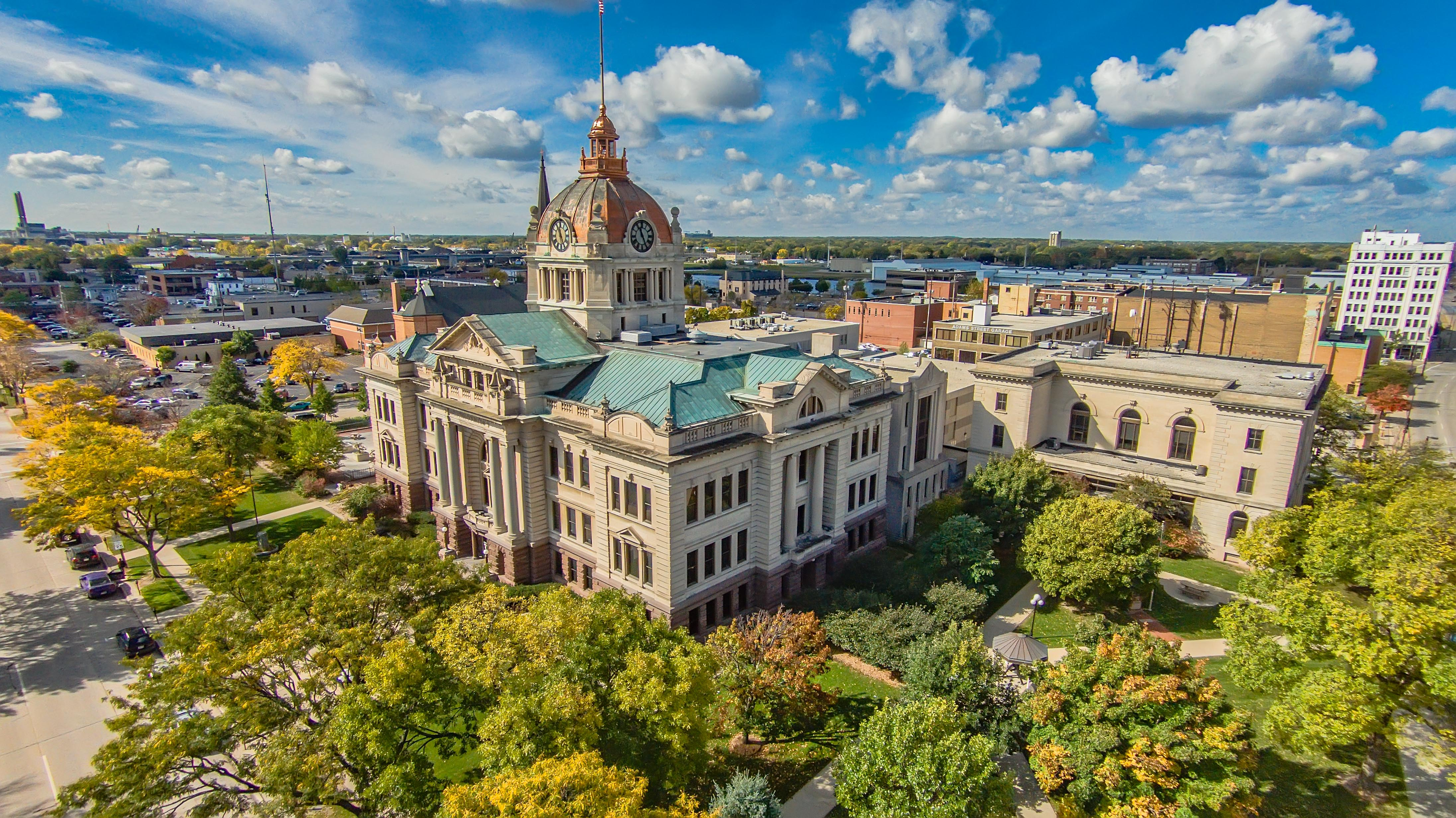
Brown County Courthouse

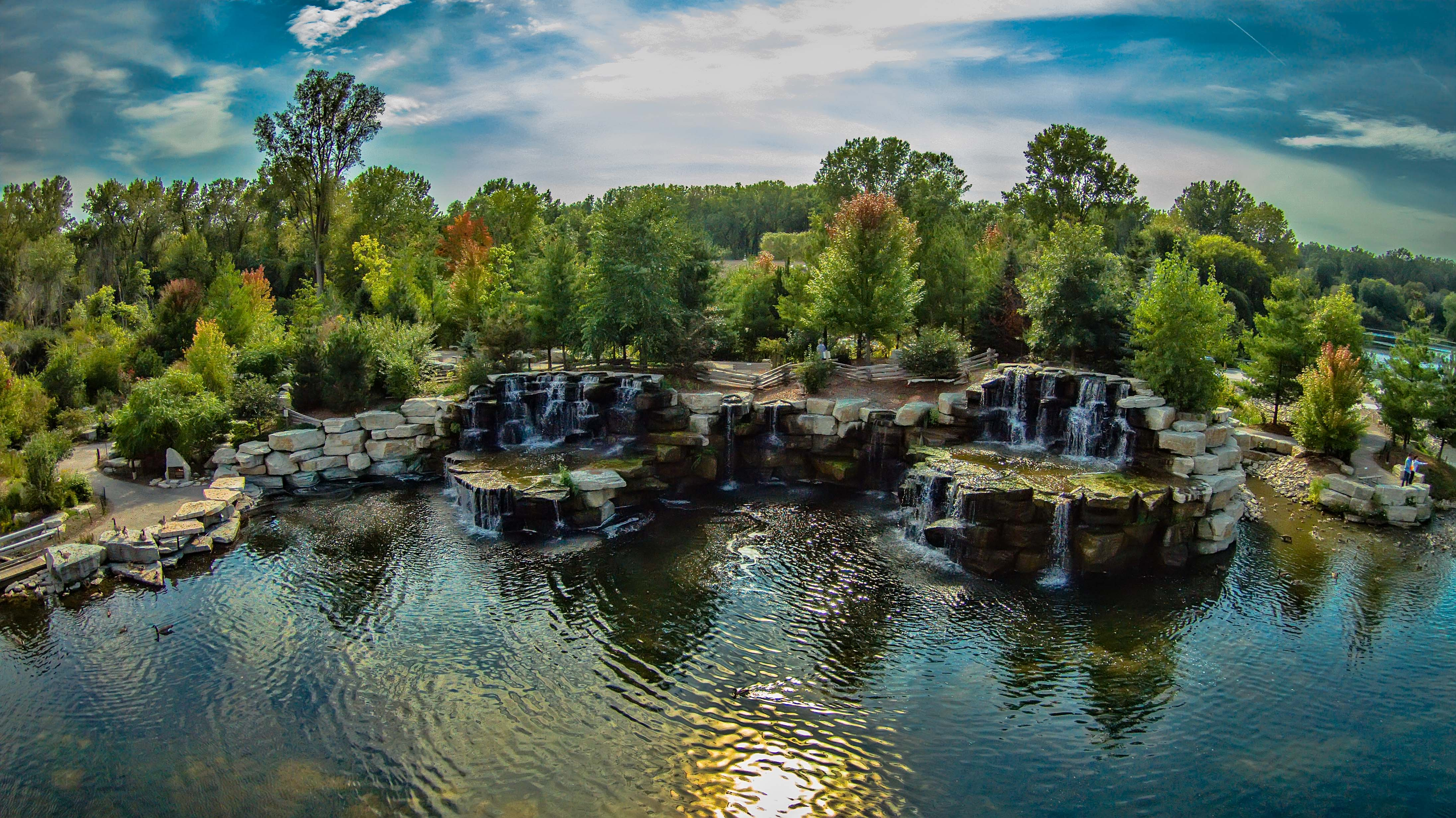
Resch Falls in Bay Beach Wildlife Sanctuary

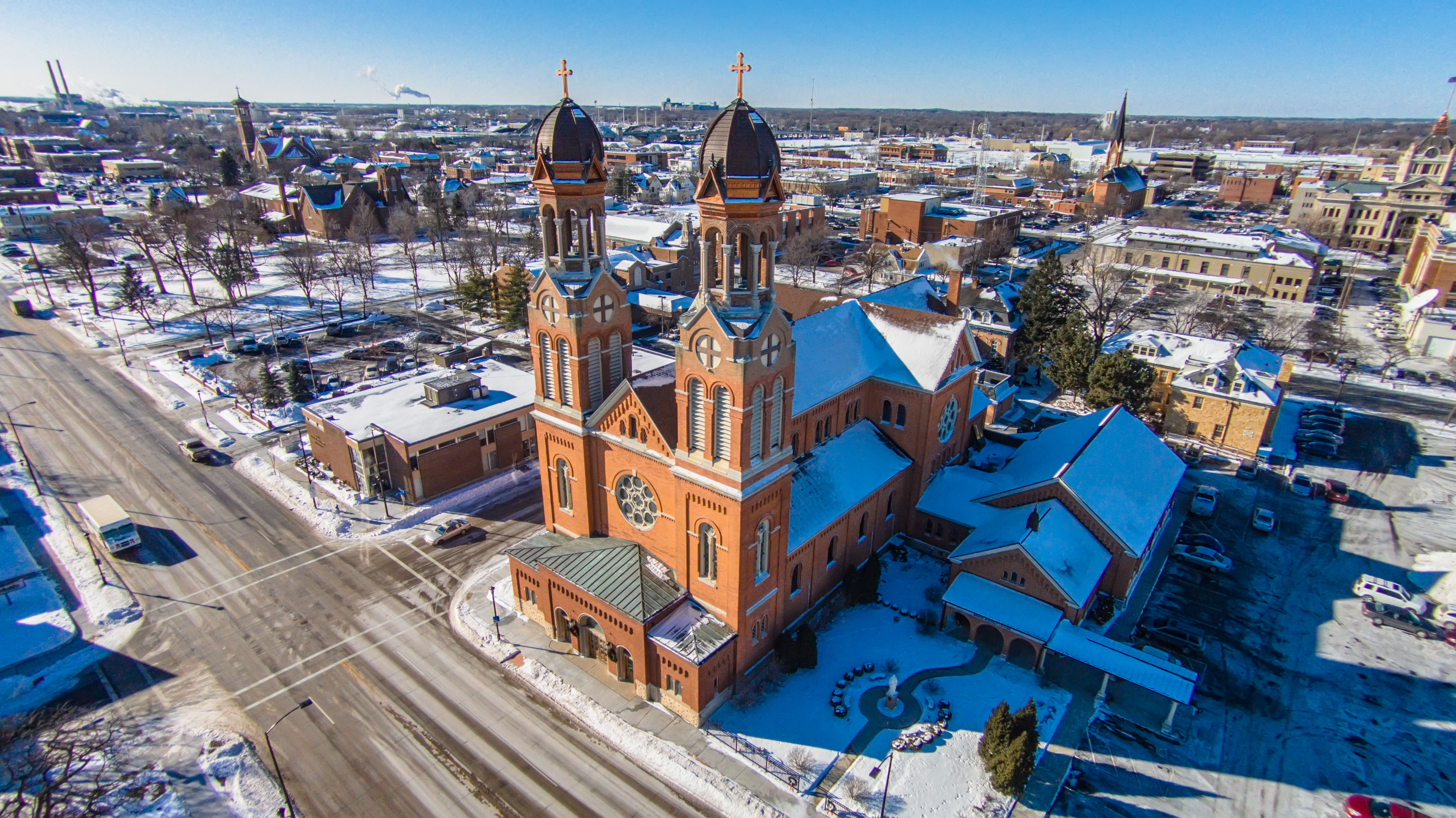
Saint Francis Xavier Cathedral

== Past senators ==
Previous senators from the district include:

Note: the boundaries of districts have changed repeatedly over history. Previous politicians of a specific numbered district have represented a completely different geographic area, due to redistricting.

Senator	Party	Notes	Session	Years	District Definition
District created by 1856 Wisc. Act 109.				1856	Buffalo, Bad Ax, Crawford, Jackson, La Crosse, Monroe, and Trempealeau counties
William T. Price	Rep.		10th	1857	Buffalo, Bad Ax, Crawford, Jackson, La Crosse, Monroe, and Trempealeau counties
William H. Tucker	Dem.		11th	1858	Buffalo, Bad Ax, Crawford, Jackson, La Crosse, Monroe, and Trempealeau counties
William H. Tucker	Dem.		12th	1859	Buffalo, Bad Ax, Crawford, Jackson, La Crosse, Monroe, and Trempealeau counties
Buel Hutchinson	Rep.		13th	1860	Buffalo, Bad Ax, Crawford, Jackson, La Crosse, Monroe, and Trempealeau counties
Buel Hutchinson	Rep.		14th	1861	Buffalo, Bad Ax, Crawford, Jackson, La Crosse, Monroe, and Trempealeau counties
Norman S. Cate	Natl. Union	Resigned May 1862.	15th	1862	Bad Ax, Crawford, and Richland counties
--Vacant--			15th	1862	Bad Ax, Crawford, and Richland counties
William S. Purdy	Rep.	Won 1862 special election.	16th	1863	Bad Ax, Crawford, and Richland counties
William Ketcham	Natl. Union		17th	1864	Bad Ax, Crawford, and Richland counties
William Ketcham	Natl. Union		18th	1865	Bad Ax, Crawford, and Richland counties
Benjamin Bull	Natl. Union		19th	1866	Bad Ax, Crawford, and Richland counties
Benjamin Bull	Natl. Union		20th	1867	Crawford and Richland counties
William Ketcham	Rep.		21st	1868	Crawford and Richland counties
William Ketcham	Rep.		22nd	1869	Crawford and Richland counties
George Krouskop	Dem.		23rd	1870	Crawford and Richland counties
George Krouskop	Dem.		24th	1871	Crawford and Richland counties
Joseph G. Thorp	Rep.		25th	1872	Chippewa, Dunn, Eau Claire, and Pepin counties 1870 population: 33,327
Joseph G. Thorp	Rep.		26th	1873	Chippewa, Dunn, Eau Claire, and Pepin counties 1870 population: 33,327
Hiram P. Graham	Dem.		27th	1874	Chippewa, Dunn, Eau Claire, and Pepin counties 1870 population: 33,327
Hiram P. Graham	Dem.		28th	1875	Chippewa, Dunn, Eau Claire, and Pepin counties 1870 population: 33,327
Rockwell J. Flint	Rep.		29th	1876	Chippewa, Dunn, Eau Claire, and Pepin counties 1870 population: 33,327
Rockwell J. Flint	Rep.		30th	1877	Dunn, Eau Claire, and Pierce counties 1875 population: 44,519; 1880 population: 54,584
Abraham D. Andrews	Rep.		31st	1878	Dunn, Eau Claire, and Pierce counties 1875 population: 44,519; 1880 population: 54,584
Abraham D. Andrews	Rep.		32nd	1879	Dunn, Eau Claire, and Pierce counties 1875 population: 44,519; 1880 population: 54,584
Michael Griffin	Rep.		33rd	1880	Dunn, Eau Claire, and Pierce counties 1875 population: 44,519; 1880 population: 54,584
Michael Griffin	Rep.		34th	1881	Dunn, Eau Claire, and Pierce counties 1875 population: 44,519; 1880 population: 54,584
Rockwell J. Flint	Rep.		35th	1882	Dunn, Eau Claire, and Pierce counties 1875 population: 44,519; 1880 population: 54,584
Rockwell J. Flint	Rep.		36th	1883–1884	Chippewa and Dunn counties 1880 population: 32,310; 1885 population: 47,086
George C. Ginty	Rep.		37th	1885–1886	Chippewa and Dunn counties 1880 population: 32,310; 1885 population: 47,086
George C. Ginty	Rep.		38th	1887–1888	Chippewa and Dunn counties 1880 population: 32,310; 1885 population: 47,086
William Millar	Rep.		39th	1889–1890	Chippewa and Dunn counties 1880 population: 32,310; 1885 population: 47,086
William Millar	Rep.		40th	1891–1892	Chippewa and Dunn counties 1880 population: 32,310; 1885 population: 47,086
Levi F. Martin	Dem.		41st	1893–1894	Chippewa, Oneida, Price, and Taylor counties 1890 population: 42,142
Levi F. Martin	Dem.		42nd	1895–1896	Chippewa, Oneida, Price, and Taylor counties 1890 population: 42,142
Daniel E. Riordan	Rep.		43rd	1897–1898	Florence, Forest, Langlade, Lincoln, Oneida, Price, Taylor, and Vilas counties 1895 population: 56,611
Daniel E. Riordan	Rep.		44th	1899–1900	Florence, Forest, Langlade, Lincoln, Oneida, Price, Taylor, and Vilas counties 1895 population: 56,611
Daniel E. Riordan	Rep.		45th	1901–1902	Florence, Forest, Langlade, Lincoln, Oneida, Price, Taylor, and Vilas counties 1895 population: 56,611
Daniel E. Riordan	Rep.		46th	1903–1904	Florence, Forest, Iron, Langlade, Lincoln, Oneida, and Vilas counties 1900 population: 53,835
James A. Wright	Rep.	Died Dec. 1911.	47th	1905–1906	Florence, Forest, Iron, Langlade, Lincoln, Oneida, and Vilas counties 1900 population: 53,835
James A. Wright	Rep.	Died Dec. 1911.	48th	1907–1908	Florence, Forest, Iron, Langlade, Lincoln, Oneida, and Vilas counties 1900 population: 53,835
James A. Wright	Rep.	Died Dec. 1911.	49th	1909–1910	Florence, Forest, Iron, Langlade, Lincoln, Oneida, and Vilas counties 1900 population: 53,835
James A. Wright	Rep.	Died Dec. 1911.	50th	1911–1912	Florence, Forest, Iron, Langlade, Lincoln, Oneida, and Vilas counties 1900 population: 53,835
--Vacant--			50th	1911–1912	Florence, Forest, Iron, Langlade, Lincoln, Oneida, and Vilas counties 1900 population: 53,835
Willard T. Stevens	Rep.	Won 1912 special election.	50th	1911–1912	Florence, Forest, Iron, Langlade, Lincoln, Oneida, and Vilas counties 1900 population: 53,835
Willard T. Stevens	Rep.	Won 1912 special election.	51st	1913–1914	Florence, Forest, Iron, Lincoln, Oneida, Taylor, and Vilas counties 1910 population: 68,626
Willard T. Stevens	Rep.	Won 1912 special election.	52nd	1915–1916	Florence, Forest, Iron, Lincoln, Oneida, Taylor, and Vilas counties 1910 population: 68,626
Willard T. Stevens	Rep.	Won 1912 special election.	53rd	1917–1918	Florence, Forest, Iron, Lincoln, Oneida, Taylor, and Vilas counties 1910 population: 68,626
Willard T. Stevens	Rep.	Won 1912 special election.	54th	1919–1920	Florence, Forest, Iron, Lincoln, Oneida, Taylor, and Vilas counties 1910 population: 68,626
Bernard N. Moran	Rep.		55th	1921–1922	Florence, Forest, Iron, Lincoln, Oneida, Taylor, and Vilas counties 1910 population: 68,626
Bernard N. Moran	Rep.		56th	1923–1924	Florence, Forest, Langlade, Marinette, and Oneida counties
James A. Barker	Rep.		57th	1925–1926	Florence, Forest, Langlade, Marinette, and Oneida counties
James A. Barker	Rep.		58th	1927–1928	Florence, Forest, Langlade, Marinette, and Oneida counties
James A. Barker	Rep.		59th	1929–1930	Florence, Forest, Langlade, Marinette, and Oneida counties
James A. Barker	Rep.		60th	1931–1932	Florence, Forest, Langlade, Marinette, and Oneida counties
Sherman W. Wade	Dem.		61st	1933–1934	Florence, Forest, Langlade, Marinette, and Oneida counties
Sherman W. Wade	Dem.		62nd	1935–1936	Florence, Forest, Langlade, Marinette, and Oneida counties
Ernest Sauld	Dem.		63rd	1937–1938	Florence, Forest, Langlade, Marinette, and Oneida counties
Ernest Sauld	Dem.		64th	1939–1940	Florence, Forest, Langlade, Marinette, and Oneida counties
Philip Downing	Rep.		65th	1941–1942	Florence, Forest, Langlade, Marinette, and Oneida counties
Philip Downing	Rep.		66th	1943–1944	Florence, Forest, Langlade, Marinette, and Oneida counties
Philip Downing	Rep.		67th	1945–1946	Florence, Forest, Langlade, Marinette, and Oneida counties
Philip Downing	Rep.		68th	1947–1948	Florence, Forest, Langlade, Marinette, and Oneida counties
Philip Downing	Rep.		69th	1949–1950	Florence, Forest, Langlade, Marinette, and Oneida counties
Philip Downing	Rep.		70th	1951–1952	Florence, Forest, Langlade, Marinette, and Oneida counties
Philip Downing	Rep.		71st	1953–1954	Florence, Forest, Langlade, Marinette, and Oneida counties
Philip Downing	Rep.		72nd	1955–1956	Florence, Forest, Langlade, Marinette, and Oconto counties
Reuben La Fave	Rep.		73rd	1957–1958	Florence, Forest, Langlade, Marinette, and Oconto counties
Reuben La Fave	Rep.		74th	1959–1960	Florence, Forest, Langlade, Marinette, and Oconto counties
Reuben La Fave	Rep.		75th	1961–1962	Florence, Forest, Langlade, Marinette, and Oconto counties
Reuben La Fave	Rep.		76th	1963–1964	Florence, Forest, Langlade, Marinette, and Oconto counties
Reuben La Fave	Rep.		77th	1965–1966	Florence, Langlade, Marinette, and Oconto counties and Northwest Brown County
Reuben La Fave	Rep.		78th	1967–1968	Florence, Langlade, Marinette, and Oconto counties and Northwest Brown County
Reuben La Fave	Rep.		79th	1969–1970	Florence, Langlade, Marinette, and Oconto counties and Northwest Brown County
Reuben La Fave	Rep.		80th	1971–1972	Florence, Langlade, Marinette, and Oconto counties and Northwest Brown County
Reuben La Fave	Rep.		81st	1973–1974	Northwest Brown County; Eastern Oconto County; Southern Marinette County
Reuben La Fave	Rep.		82nd	1975–1976	Northwest Brown County; Eastern Oconto County; Southern Marinette County
Jerome Van Sistine	Dem.		83rd	1977–1978	Northwest Brown County; Eastern Oconto County; Southern Marinette County
Jerome Van Sistine	Dem.		84th	1979–1980	Northwest Brown County; Eastern Oconto County; Southern Marinette County
Jerome Van Sistine	Dem.		85th	1981–1982	Northwest Brown County; Eastern Oconto County; Southern Marinette County
Jerome Van Sistine	Dem.		86th	1983–1984	
Jerome Van Sistine	Dem.		87th	1985–1986	
Jerome Van Sistine	Dem.		88th	1987–1988	
Jerome Van Sistine	Dem.		89th	1989–1990	
Jerome Van Sistine	Dem.		90th	1991–1992	
Gary Drzewiecki	Rep.		91st	1993–1994	Northwest Brown County; Eastern Oconto County; Southern Marinette County
Gary Drzewiecki	Rep.		92nd	1995–1996	Northwest Brown County; Eastern Oconto County; Southern Marinette County
Gary Drzewiecki	Rep.		93rd	1997–1998	Northwest Brown County; Eastern Oconto County; Southern Marinette County
Gary Drzewiecki	Rep.		94th	1999–2000	Northwest Brown County; Eastern Oconto County; Southern Marinette County
Dave Hansen	Dem.		95th	2001–2002	Northwest Brown County; Eastern Oconto County; Southern Marinette County
Dave Hansen	Dem.		96th	2003–2004	Northern Brown County; Eastern Oconto County; Southern Marinette County
Dave Hansen	Dem.		97th	2005–2006	Northern Brown County; Eastern Oconto County; Southern Marinette County
Dave Hansen	Dem.		98th	2007–2008	Northern Brown County; Eastern Oconto County; Southern Marinette County
Dave Hansen	Dem.		99th	2009–2010	Northern Brown County; Eastern Oconto County; Southern Marinette County
Dave Hansen	Dem.		100th	2011–2012	Northern Brown County; Eastern Oconto County; Southern Marinette County
Dave Hansen	Dem.		101st	2013–2014	Central Brown County; Eastern Oconto County; Southern Marinette County
Dave Hansen	Dem.		102nd	2015–2016	Central Brown County; Eastern Oconto County; Southern Marinette County
Dave Hansen	Dem.		103rd	2017–2018	Central Brown County; Eastern Oconto County; Southern Marinette County
Dave Hansen	Dem.		104th	2019–2020	Central Brown County; Eastern Oconto County; Southern Marinette County
Eric Wimberger	Rep.		105th	2021–2022	Central Brown County; Eastern Oconto County; Southern Marinette County
Eric Wimberger	Rep.		106th	2023–2024	Central Brown County, eastern Oconto County, southern Marinette County
Jamie Wall	Dem.		107th	2025–2026	Central Brown County
