= William Ketcham =

American merchant and politician (1819–1879)

Member of the Wisconsin Senate from the 30th district
- In office January 6, 1868 – January 3, 1870
- Preceded by: Benjamin Bull
- Succeeded by: George Krouskop
- In office January 4, 1864 – January 1, 1866
- Preceded by: William S. Purdy
- Succeeded by: Benjamin Bull

Personal details
- Born: May 24, 1819 Jericho, New York
- Died: September 14, 1879 (aged 60) Buena Vista, Richland County, Wisconsin
- Resting place: Button Cemetery, Buena Vista, Richland County, Wisconsin
- Party: Republican
- Spouse: Lodema Hepzibah Todd (m. 1856–1879)
- Children: Charles Bates Ketcham^{(b. 1858; died 1921)}; William Jagger Ketcham^{(b. 1859; died 1904)}; Abigail Rebecca Ketcham^{(b. 1863; died 1863)}; Maggie Louise Ketcham^{(b. 1865; died 1879)}

William Ketcham (May 24, 1819 – September 14, 1879) was an American lumber merchant and Republican politician. He served four years in the Wisconsin State Senate (1864–1865, 1868–1869), and was an assistant state treasurer. His name is sometimes spelled Ketchum in historical documents.

== Biography ==
Born in Jericho, New York, he moved to Wisconsin in 1851 and became involved in the lumber business. He primarily resided at Buena Vista in Richland County, and purchased a share of the ownership of a local lumber mill.

He served on the County Board of Supervisors, and was elected in 1863 and 1867 to the Wisconsin State Senate. He was considered an influential Republican in the county, and an ally of Lucius Fairchild. During Fairchild's gubernatorial terms, Ketcham served as an assistant state treasurer.

He died at his home on September 14, 1879.

Wisconsin Senate
Preceded by William S. Purdy	Member of the Wisconsin Senate from the 30th district January 4, 1864 – January 1, 1866	Succeeded by Benjamin Bull
Preceded by Benjamin Bull	Member of the Wisconsin Senate from the 30th district January 6, 1868 – January 3, 1870	Succeeded by George Krouskop
