= Martha E. Long =

American legislator

Martha E. Long was a state legislator in Colorado. A Republican, she represented Denver County from 1925–1928.

She sponsored and co-sponsored several bills including one for appropriations in support of the State Home for Dependent and Neglected Children. She and Minnie C. T. Love introduced a bill to allow women to serve on juries.

== See also ==
- Colorado Women's Hall of Fame
