= William S. Purdy =

19th century American politician

County Judge of Vernon County, Wisconsin
- In office January 1, 1870 – January 1, 1878
- Preceded by: Carson Graham
- Succeeded by: Cyrus M. Butt

Member of the Wisconsin Senate from the 30th district
- In office January 5, 1863 – January 4, 1864
- Preceded by: Norman S. Cate
- Succeeded by: William Ketcham

Wisconsin Circuit Court Clerk for Vernon County, Wisconsin
- In office January 1, 1860 – January 1, 1868
- Preceded by: John R. Casson
- Succeeded by: H. N. Preus

Personal details
- Born: August 28, 1822 Carlisle, Indiana, U.S.
- Died: January 5, 1901 (aged 78) Wichita, Kansas, U.S.
- Resting place: Highland Cemetery, Wichita
- Party: Republican; Whig (before 1854)
- Spouse: Jane Elizabeth Lemen (m. 1846–1901)
- Children: Brice Field Purdy^{(b. 1849; died 1927)}; Kossuth F. Purdy^{(b. 1851; died 1927)}; William Robert Purdy^{(b. 1854; died 1949)}; Henry Harrison Purdy^{(b. 1856; died 1946)}; Ellen May (Chinn)^{(b. 1859; died 1947)}; Frank Lemen Purdy^{(b. 1864; died 1932)}; Ida M. Purdy^{(b. 1864; died young)}; Edward Purdy^{(b. 1866; died 1936)}; Ida Ruth (Kinzer)^{(b. 1875; died 1952)}; 1 other
- Occupation: Saddler, Farmer

William Smith Purdy (August 28, 1822 – January 5, 1901) was an American farmer, judge, Republican politician, and Wisconsin pioneer. He was a member of the Wisconsin Senate, representing the 30th Senate district during the 1863 session. He also served as county judge of Vernon County, Wisconsin, where he famously won a Wisconsin Supreme Court case invalidating his own election defeat in 1873.

== Early life ==
William S. Purdy was born in Carlisle, Indiana, in August 1822. His father died when he was 11 years old, and Purdy went to work assisting his mother. Because of limited funds and few schooling options, Purdy was mostly educated by subscription school. At age 15, he went to work as an apprentice saddler in his native town. He continued pursuing that trade until 1845, when he moved west to the Wisconsin Territory. He initially settled in Mineral Point, where he went to work in the booming mining industry.

== Wisconsin career ==
After earning no money from mining, he returned to harness making and saddle making in Mineral Point and began earning a profit. In 1849, Purdy moved to what is now the town of Sterling, Vernon County, Wisconsin, and purchased a farm. At the time, the town was known as "Bad Ax" and was part of an enlarged Crawford County. During his first year at Sterling, he cut a road to Port Andrew on the Wisconsin River. He managed his farm for ten years with varying success.

Purdy authored the petition which eventually led to the creation of the Sterling as an independent town government in 1857. At the first organized town meeting in Sterling, the elected treasurer, Lee Grant Sterling, failed to qualify, and Purdy was therefore appointed the first town treasurer. It was the first of many local offices he'd hold in Sterling. In 1859 he was chairman of the town board, and was an ex officio member of the Bad Ax County board of supervisors. Purdy's land at the time was also the site of a post office, known as Purdy, which is the present site of the unincorporated settlement known as Purdy, Wisconsin.

Politically, Purdy was initially associated with the Whig Party, but then joined the Republican Party when that party was established in 1854. Purdy was admitted to the bar in 1859 but never practiced as a lawyer. That year, he was elected Wisconsin circuit court clerk for Bad Ax County, running on the Republican Party ticket.

The court was located at the county seat in Viroqua, Wisconsin, and during his first year as clerk, Purdy moved full time into the village of Viroqua. He was subsequently re-elected in 1861, 1863, and 1865. During 1863, his name was placed in nomination for state bank comptroller, which was then a state-wide elected office, but the convention renominated the incumbent William Ramsey. While living in Viroqua, Purdy again resumed his craft as a harness maker and opened the first harness shop in the village. His son, Brice Field Purdy, took over the business sometime before the 1880s. In addition to his county offices, Purdy served in several local offices in Viroqua, including village clerk, trustee, and justice of the peace.

Following the resignation of incumbent state senator Norman S. Cate, a special election was scheduled for Fall 1862 to fill the remaining year of his term. Purdy was chosen as the Republican nominee. He defeated Democratic nominee Charles Rodolf and went on to serve in the Wisconsin Senate for the 1863 session. Purdy was not a candidate for re-election to the Senate in 1863.

On June 28, 1865, a tornado swept through Viroqua, killing 17 people and destroying the entire southern half of the town. Purdy's house was completely destroyed, the only fatality in his household was a servant girl who worked for the family at their home. His wife and children survived by running into the parlor and lying on the ground as the house was lifted from its foundation.

Purdy returned to elected office in 1869, when he was elected county judge. He ultimately served eight years in office, surviving a contested re-election race in 1873.

=== Newell v. Purdy (1874) ===
In 1873, Purdy ran for another four-year term as county judge. In the April general election, he was narrowly defeated by his opponent, James E. Newell, with Newell prevailing by 23 votes. Purdy, however, refused to relinquish the office on the grounds that Newell had used an illegitimate campaign tactic. During the campaign, Newell had stated that he would perform the duties of the office for $600, as opposed to the established salary of $1,000. Purdy contended that this amounted to a type of bribery, and corrupted the election process. Purdy then named 100 voters who claimed to have been induced to change their votes by Newell's promise.

The matter was referred to the Wisconsin Supreme Court by the state attorney general. In the case State ex rel. Newell v. Purdy, the court decided in Purdy's favor, finding that the salary promise did represent a pecuniary benefit to the taxpayers of the county, and was therefore an illegal inducement. Any vote tainted by the inducement was therefore illegitimate, and Newell's majority was eliminated.

== Later years ==
Purdy did not run for another term in 1877, and left office in 1878. Later that year, suffering from poor health, he decided to move south to a warmer climate. He relocated to Pratt County, Kansas, where he resided for much of the rest of his life. In his later years, he moved to Wichita, Kansas, where he died on January 8, 1901.

== Personal life and family ==
William S. Purdy married Jane Elizabeth Lemen in 1846 at Knox County, Indiana. They had ten children together, though at least one died young.

== Electoral history ==
=== Vernon County Circuit Court Clerk (1859, 1861, 1863, 1865) ===
Wisconsin Circuit Court Clerk, Bad Ax County Election, 1859
Party	Candidate	Votes	%	±%
General Election, November 8, 1859
Republican	William S. Purdy	938	58.01%	+11.16%
Democratic	B. F. Hartshorn	678	41.93%	−11.22%
Independent	J. M. McCes	1	0.06%	
Plurality		260	16.08%	+9.78%
Total votes		1,320	100.0%	+64.33%
Republican gain from Democratic				

Wisconsin Circuit Court Clerk, Vernon County Election, 1861
Party	Candidate	Votes	%	±%
General Election, November 5, 1861
Republican	William S. Purdy (incumbent)	785	65.69%	+7.68%
Democratic	Vandwall	410	34.31%	
Plurality		375	31.38%	+15.30%
Total votes		1,195	100.0%	-26.10%
Republican hold				

Wisconsin Circuit Court Clerk, Vernon County Election, 1865
Party	Candidate	Votes	%	±%
General Election, November 7, 1865
Republican	William S. Purdy (incumbent)	1,055	83.66%	
Democratic	W. G. Davis	183	14.51%	
Independent	John R. Casson	23	1.82%	
Plurality		872	69.15%	
Total votes		1,261	100.0%	
Republican hold				

=== Vernon County Judge (1869, 1873) ===
Vernon County Judge Election, 1869
Party	Candidate	Votes	%	±%
General Election, April 6, 1869
Republican	William S. Purdy	1,587	89.66%	+33.40%
Democratic	Hugh McDill	183	10.34%	
Plurality		872	79.32%	+66.80%
Total votes		1,261	100.0%	+40.25%
Republican hold				

Vernon County Judge Election, 1873
Party	Candidate	Votes	%	±%
General Election, April 6, 1873
Reform	James E. Newell	1,240	50.47%	
Republican	William S. Purdy (incumbent)	1,217	49.53%	−40.13%
Plurality		23	0.94%	-78.39%
Total votes		2,457	100.0%	+38.81%
Republican hold				

Wisconsin Senate
Preceded by Norman S. Cate	Member of the Wisconsin Senate from the 30th district January 5, 1863 – January 4, 1864	Succeeded by William Ketcham
Legal offices
Preceded by John R. Casson	Wisconsin Circuit Court Clerk for Vernon County, Wisconsin; January 1, 1860 – January 1, 1868	Succeeded by H. N. Preus
Preceded by Carson Graham	County Judge of Vernon County, Wisconsin; January 1, 1870 – January 1, 1878	Succeeded by Cyrus M. Butt
