= Blanche Roosevelt =

American opera singer and writer (1853–1898)

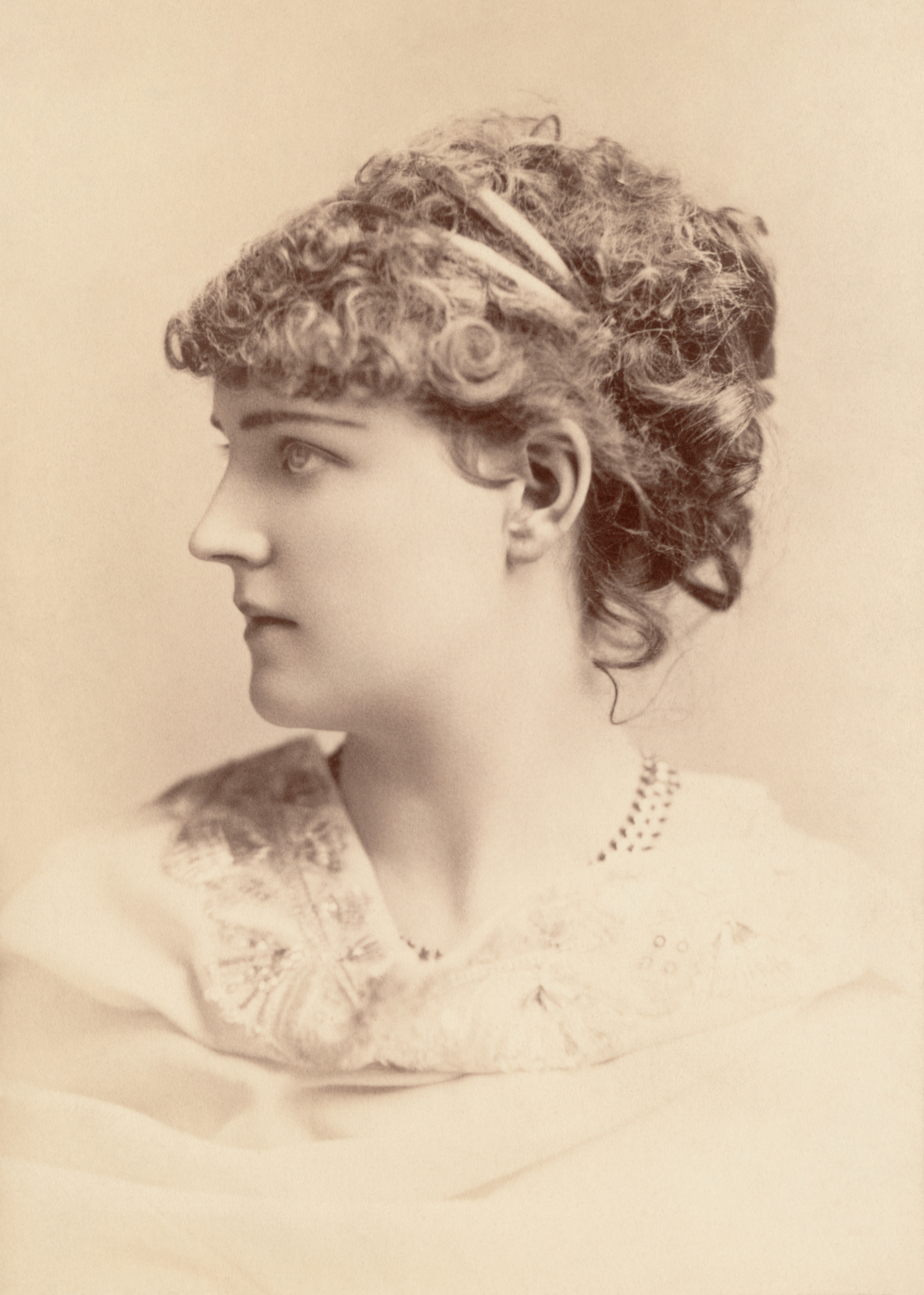
Blanche Roosevelt by José María Mora, c. 1870s

Blanche Roosevelt (born Blanche Isabella Pauline Tucker; 2 October 1853 – 10 September 1898) was an American opera singer, author and journalist. She is best remembered for creating the role of Mabel in The Pirates of Penzance by Gilbert and Sullivan when that opera premiered on Broadway in 1879.

She made her opera debut in 1876 at the Royal Italian Opera House, Covent Garden, and went on to sing in concerts in Europe, having worked as a journalist from Paris in 1875. In 1879, she joined the D'Oyly Carte Opera Company and played the role of Josephine in Gilbert and Sullivan's H.M.S. Pinafore in London before travelling with the company to New York City to play the same role and to originate the role of Mabel in The Pirates of Penzance.

Later in 1880, she co-founded, produced and starred in a new opera company, but this venture soon folded, and Roosevelt retired from the stage. She and her husband, the Marquis d'Alligri, returned to Europe by 1882 where she pursued a career in journalism and literature, writing biographies and novels. She became the mistress of Guy de Maupassant.

== Early life and opera career ==
Roosevelt was born in Sandusky, Ohio, (Note: Most sources give Sandusky as her birthplace. Her memorial in Brompton Cemetery states that she was born in Virginia and gives her date of birth date as 2 October 1858) the daughter of William H. Tucker of Virginia (later a state senator in Wisconsin) and his wife Elizabeth Letitia "Lizzie", née Roosevelt. Her sister was Minnie C. T. Love, a physician and suffragist who served in the Colorado House of Representatives. Roosevelt traveled to Europe with her mother for vocal studies in Paris and then in Milan, briefly with Francesco Lamperti.

In 1876, billed as Mlle. Rosavella, she made her singing debut at the Royal Italian Opera House, Covent Garden, London, as Violetta in La Traviata. The Times noted the enthusiastic reception she received from the Covent Garden audience, and the paper's reviewer praised her acting as well as her singing. She went on to sing in concerts in Italy, Belgium, the Netherlands and France. She also worked as a correspondent from Paris in 1875 for newspapers in Chicago and London.

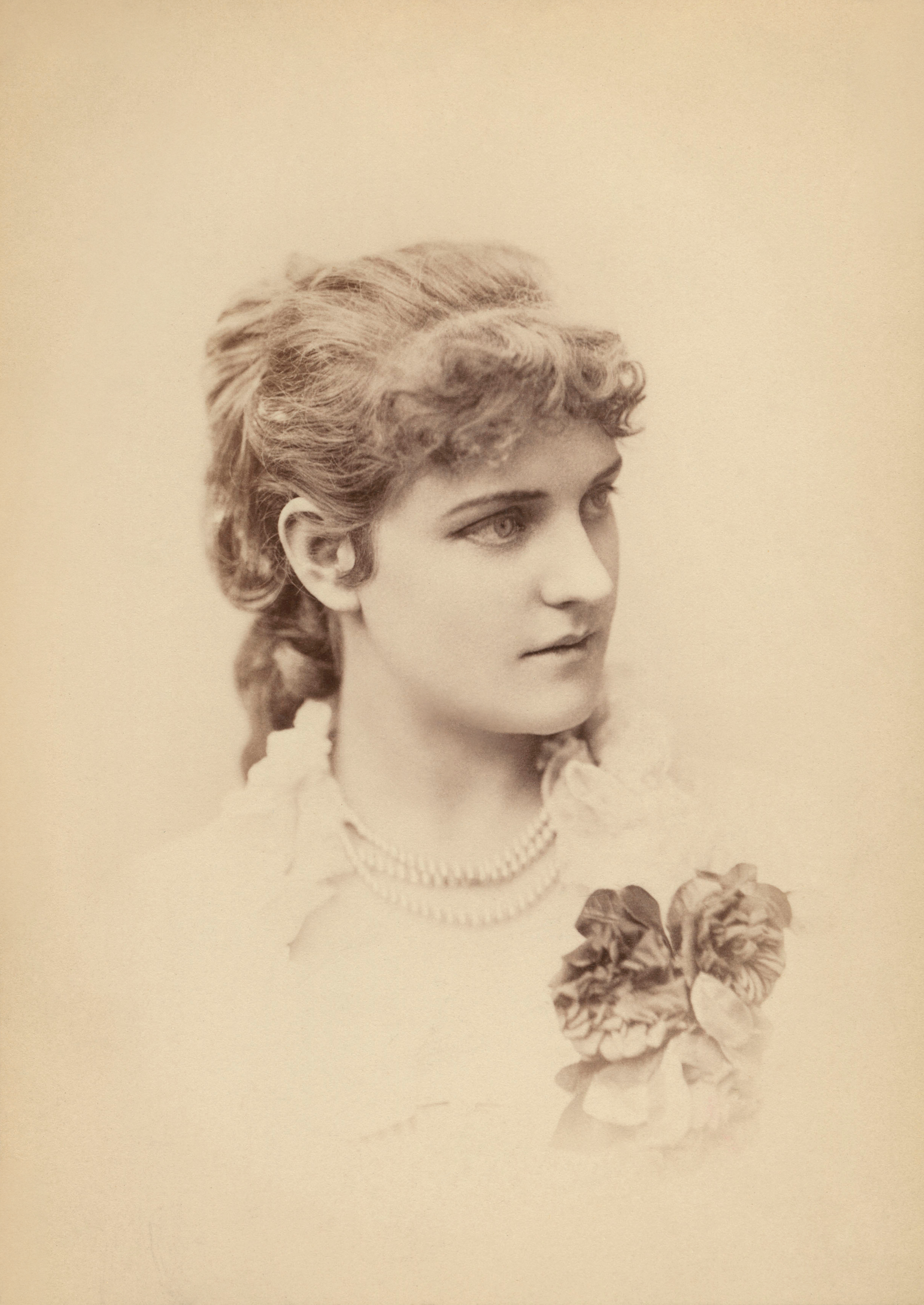
Photograph by Napoleon Sarony, circa 1879

Arthur Sullivan heard the soprano while on holiday in the south of France in the summer of 1879. In September 1879, Roosevelt joined the D'Oyly Carte Opera Company and made her debut at the Opera Comique, taking over the role of Josephine during the original run of Gilbert and Sullivan's H.M.S. Pinafore. The music critic in The Morning Post commented, "she has manifest talent and promises well. Her voice is sweet, sympathetic and of considerable compass, and her manner is very light and pleasant". She was then chosen by W. S. Gilbert, Sullivan, and Richard D'Oyly Carte to play Aline in The Sorcerer, and Josephine in the first authentic D'Oyly Carte Pinafore, at New York's Fifth Avenue Theatre, beginning on December 1, 1879. On December 31 of that year, in the same theatre, she created the role of Mabel in The Pirates of Penzance. The New-York Tribune reviewed her as "certainly a pretty object to look upon; she sang creditably; she acted with zeal and good sense." The New York Mercury, however, was unimpressed by her performance, commenting that she and her tenor colleague, Hugh Talbot, were "incapable performers", although they "failed to destroy" the opera. She played Mabel in New York and on tour until March 1880, when she left the company, but she returned briefly as Mabel for performances in Boston from 26 April to 8 May 1880.

Later in 1880, together with John McCaull, she co-founded and produced a new opera company, the Blanche Roosevelt English Opera Company, appearing in its productions, which were financial failures, of Alfred Cellier's The Sultan of Mocha (Union Square Theatre, New York, September 1880) and B. C. Stephenson and Cellier's operatic adaptation of Henry Wadsworth Longfellow's The Masque of Pandora (Boston Theatre, January 1881). During this project, Roosevelt became friends with Longfellow. In 1881 she appeared in New York in concerts, and on returning to England she was booked by Maurice Strakosch for his touring opera company to appear as Marguerite in Faust at the French Opera House in New Orleans. She returned to Broadway as Mabel in Pirates, where a critic called her "a beautiful girl, somewhat uncouth in her gestures with a well-taught but bodiless voice which gives promise of effect but, alas, breaks the promise to the ear". Soon afterwards, she retired from the stage, largely at the behest of her husband, Signor Macchetta, an Italian who had succeeded to the title of Marquis d'Alligri. She returned to Europe by 1882 and began a career in journalism and literature.

== Writing career ==
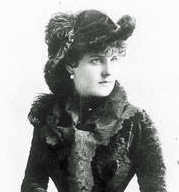
Roosevelt in 1885

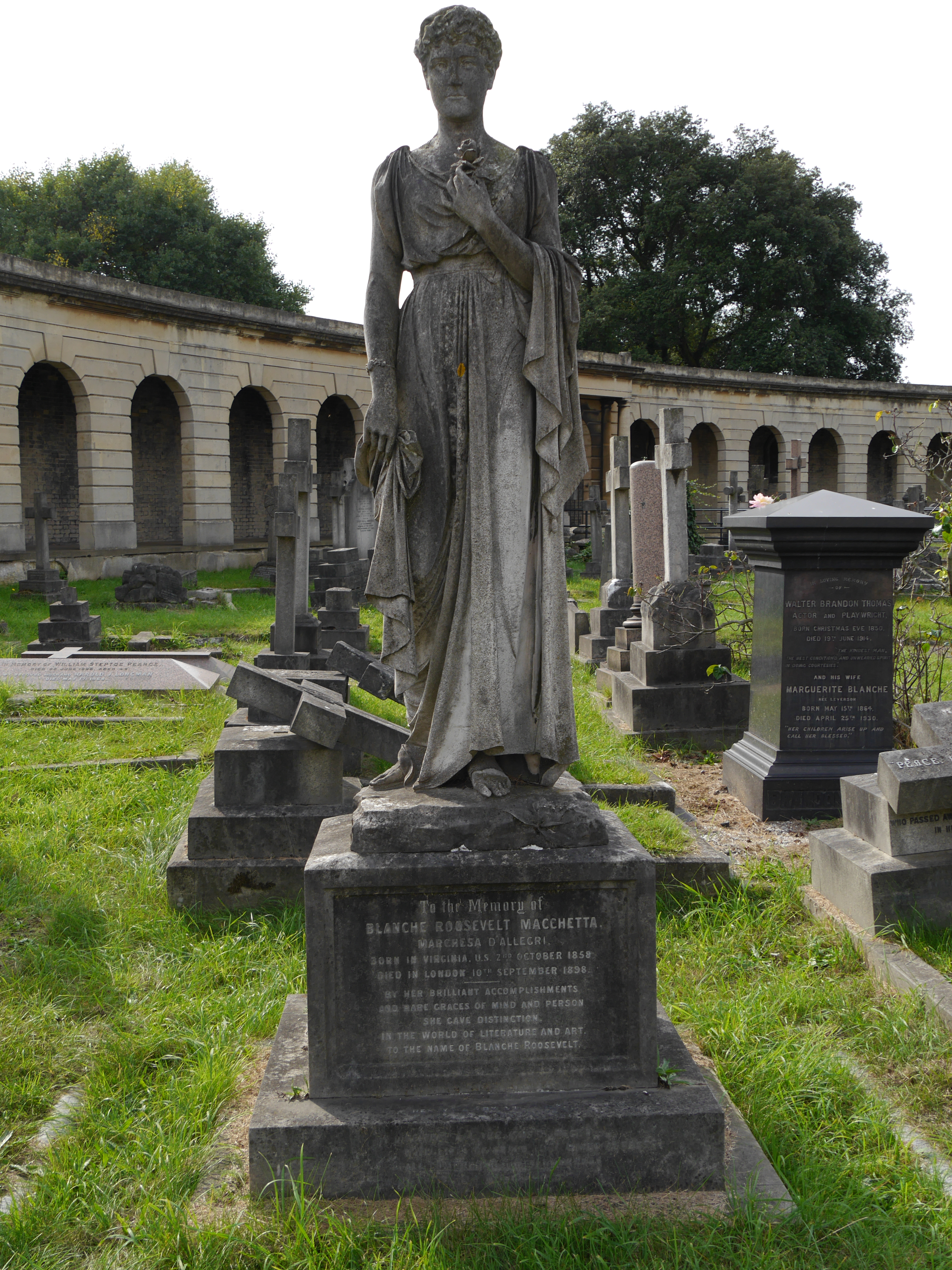
Funerary monument, Brompton Cemetery, London

Roosevelt became acquainted with important figures in the world of literature and the arts, including (in addition to Longfellow) Giuseppe Verdi, Victorien Sardou, Wilkie Collins, Gustave Doré and Guy de Maupassant, whose mistress she became in 1884. Roosevelt's first book wase The Home Life of Henry W. Longfellow (1882), followed by the novel Stage-Struck; or, She would Be an Opera Singer (1884), The Life and Reminiscences of Gustave Doré (1885, for which she was reportedly the first American woman honored by the French Academy), and another novel, The Copper Queen (1886), which was adapted for the stage by Sardou.

She had earlier worked for American newspapers as a correspondent from Paris in 1875; in early 1887, she began a similar assignment in Milan, reporting on the premiere of Verdi's Otello. Her columns were collected in book form as Verdi: Milan, and Othello, published later that year and dedicated to Wilkie Collins: "When I left England for Italy, you said, 'Do write me all about Verdi, Milan, and the new opera Othello.' I have taken you at your word; only the letters, like most feminine epistles, have stretched away into limitless pages, and from a few vagabond sheets have grown into a volume. I am sure you will never again ask a woman to write to you, even from Paradise; but in the mean time, here is the result of your amiability."

Later books by Roosevelt, then referred to as the Marchesa d'Alligri (all published posthumously), included Elisabeth of Roumania – a study (Carmen Sylva) (1891), the novel Hazel Fane (1891), Familiar faces – Victorien Sardou: poet, author, and member of the Academy of France; a personal study (1892), and A Riviera Romance (1899).

== Later life and fatal accident ==
Roosevelt spent the later years of her life in the south of France. In 1897, she was riding in a carriage in Monte Carlo that overturned when the horses bolted, killing the driver and seriously injuring Roosevelt. She never recovered from her injuries, dying the next year in London at the age of 44. At her death, she left few possessions and some small debts.

Roosevelt is buried in Brompton Cemetery, London, where there is a statue of her on her grave. Her tomb was listed Grade II on the National Heritage List for England in December 2011.

== Notes, references and sources ==
=== Sources ===
- Rollins, Cyril; R. John Witts (1962). The D'Oyly Carte Opera Company in Gilbert and Sullivan Operas: A Record of Productions, 1875–1961. London: Michael Joseph. OCLC 504581419.

=== Further reading ===
- Metz, Charles, "Blanche Roosevelt", Opera News, March 23, 1963 issue.
- Culbertson, Judi & Tom Randall, Permanent Londoners, Robson Books, London, 1991.
- Peters, Catherine, The King of Inventors, A Life of Wilkie Collins, Seeker & Warburg, London, 1991.
