= Norman S. Cate =

19th century American politician

Member of the Wisconsin Senate from the 30th district
- In office January 6, 1862 – May 1862
- Preceded by: Buel Hutchinson
- Succeeded by: William S. Purdy

Personal details
- Born: November 14, 1815 Montpelier, Vermont, U.S.
- Died: December 22, 1893 (aged 78) Boston, Massachusetts, U.S.
- Resting place: Cambridge Cemetery, Cambridge, Massachusetts
- Spouses: Martha A. Flanders (m. 1842; died 1848); Hannah J. Holmes (m. 1849; died 1893)
- Children: with Martha Flanders; Annie E. (Pickering)^{(b. 1844; died 1875)}; Norman Frank Cate^{(b. 1846; died 1917)}; Martha A. Cate^{(b. 1848; died 1848)}; with Hannah Holmes; Emma J. "Jennie" (Stearns)^{(b. 1849; died 1889)}; Clara Elizabeth (Ellis)^{(b. 1852; died 1915)}
- Occupation: Merchant

Norman Smith Cate (November 14, 1815 – December 22, 1893) was an American businessman in Massachusetts and Wisconsin. He was a member of the Wisconsin Senate for part of one year, representing the 30th Senate district for the first session of the 1862 term.

== Biography ==
Norman S. Cate was born in Montpelier, Vermont, in November 1815. He moved to East Cambridge, Massachusetts, where he went into business. In 1849, he was the founder of a pressed glass manufacturing company in partnership with two English immigrants, Mason and Gaffer Teasdale. By 1851, they were low on funds and took on Amory Houghton as an investor, incorporating as the Bay State Glass Company. Houghton became enamored with the glass-making business and attempted to increase his ownership of the company in the 1850s, he became restless as a minority shareholder, and liquidated all of his investments in 1854 to start a competing glass business, the Union Glass Company. Cate sought new investors, and took on Linas A. Phillips as a new partner.

The glass business declined into the late 1850s, and Cate sought new opportunities. In 1857, he moved to Wisconsin and resided at De Soto, Wisconsin. There he was responsible for the construction of several early mills and commercial businesses under the firm name N. S. Cate & Co.

Cate was not active in politics, but just weeks before the 1861 election, he was induced by several prominent Democrats of the area to run for Wisconsin Senate on the Union ticket. Their appeal proposed that, in the midst of Civil War, a Union ticket should prevail over the regular Republican candidate. He prevailed over his Republican opponent, Cyrus M. Butt, in the general election for the 30th Senate district. His district comprised Crawford, Richland, and his own county Vernon (then known as "Bad Ax"). Cate served through the first regular session of the 1862 legislative term, but resigned abruptly in May 1862 to return to Massachusetts. The 1862 Legislature ended up reconvening in June and September with a vacancy in the 30th Senate district.

He returned to his glass business, which saw a significant increase in demand for military and medical equipment due to the Civil War. The business prospered through the war, but began to decline again afterward. Following the Panic of 1873, the shareholders of Cate's company voted to dissolve and sell off the assets.

Norman S. Cate died at a home for the elderly in Boston on December 22, 1893.

== Personal life and family ==
Norman S. Cate was the third of eight children born to John Page Cate and his wife Patience (née Gove) of Montpelier, Vermont. The Cates were descended from James Cate, a carpenter who emigrated from England to the Province of New Hampshire sometime before 1657.

Norman S. Cate married Martha A. Flanders at Cambridge, in 1842. Martha Flanders was adopted as a child by her aunt, Elizabeth Hunt, and shortly after her marriage to Cate, they adopted a daughter of Mrs. Johnathan Hunt, likely a cousin. They had three more children together before Martha's death in 1848. The next year, Norman Cate married Hannah J. Holmes, with whom he had two more daughters.

Wisconsin Senate
Preceded by Buel Hutchinson	Member of the Wisconsin Senate from the 30th district January 6, 1862 – May 1862	Succeeded by William S. Purdy
