= 1865 Viroqua tornado =

Tornado in Wisconsin, United States

Coordinates: 43.556°N 90.887°W

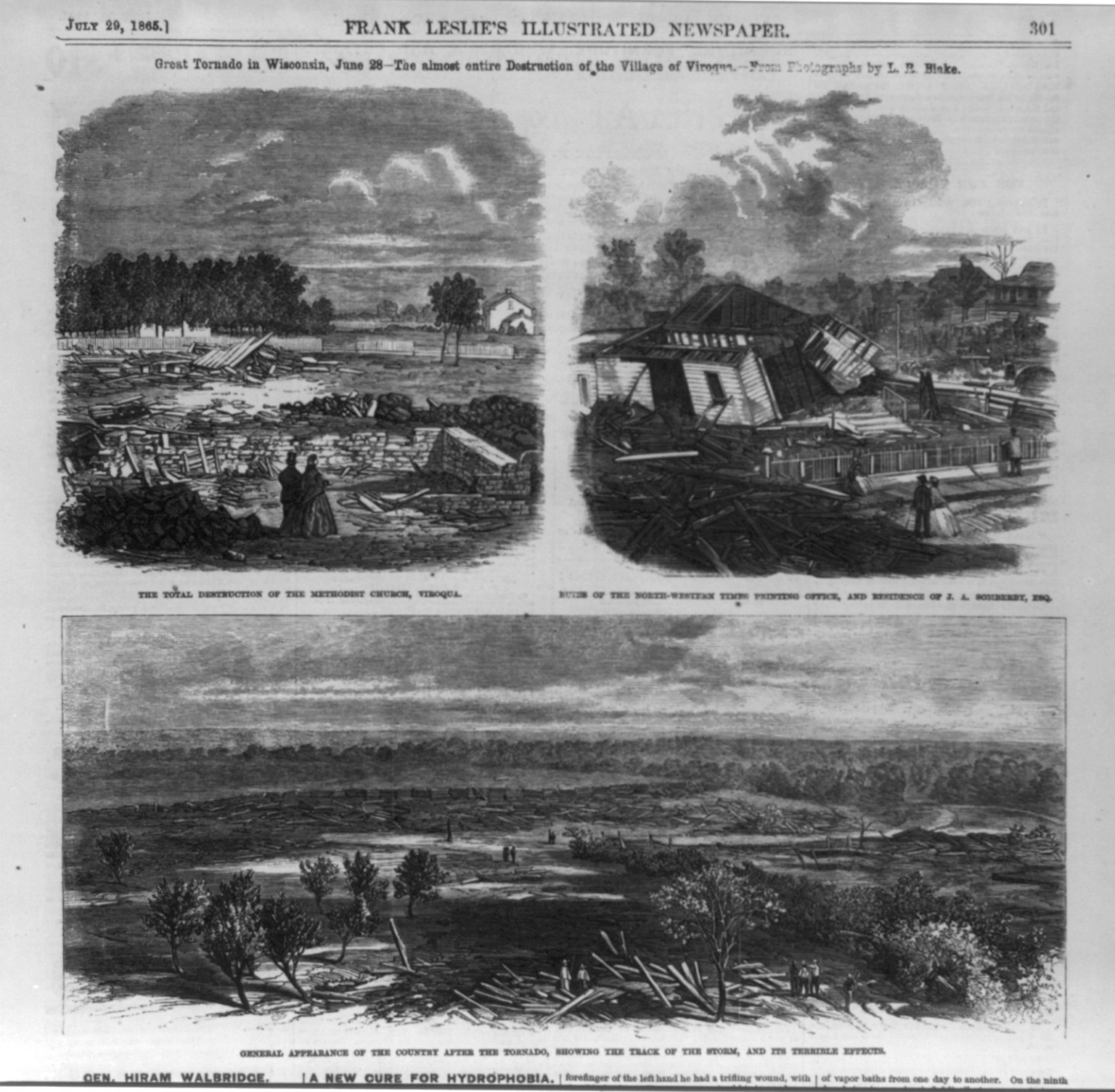
- 3 Illustrations depicting the aftermath | 1. Total destruction of the Methodist Church; 2. Ruins of the North-Western Times Printing Office, and residence of J.A. Somerby; 3. General appearance of the country after the tornado, showing the track of the storm, and its terrible effects

Meteorological history
- Formed: June 29, 1865 4:00 pm CST

F4 equiv. tornado
- Highest winds: >207 MPH

Overall effects
- Fatalities: 17+
- Injuries: >100
- Economic losses: $200 thousand (1865 USD)
- Areas affected: Vernon County, Wisconsin (Primarily the city of Viroqua)

During the afternoon hours of June 28, 1865, a violent and deadly tornado devastated areas in Vernon County, Wisconsin, primarily the city of Viroqua. The tornado tracked at least 23 miles (37 km) through Vernon County, where it caused US$200,000 (1865) in damage killed at least 17 people (possibly as many as 34) and injured at least 100 more. It was one of the first deadly tornadoes recorded in Wisconsin, and as of 2025, remains the fourth deadliest tornado in Wisconsin history. Although the tornado is unrated, most experts commonly agree on a rating of F4 on the Fujita scale.

== Tornado summary ==
At approximately 3:30 PM CST, a tornado touched down near New Albin, Iowa, and crossed the Mississippi River near Bad Axe City, south of Genoa, Wisconsin. The tornado tracked east-northeastward, initially only uprooting trees. The tornado obliterated three farms around 3 miles (5 km) west of Viroqua as it intensified before destroying three more houses in the immediate vicinity. As the tornado approached Viroqua, the funnel was accompanied by a "branch whirl holding on like a parasite." The tornado struck Viroqua at violent intensity, initially sweeping two homes before annihilating the southern third of the city. Multiple vortex "branches" and "eddies" were observed as the tornado passed through the town. "Death rode upon that sulphury siroc" as "the angry elements at the beck of an invisible power lay waste the fairest portion of the village."

More than 40 homes, churches, and barns were swept away while a similar number of other structures suffered significant damage. Debris from countless homes, timber, equipment, and other parts of structures filled the air as the tornado ravaged through the city, with the aftermath being described as it "appeared as though the Union Army's combined artillery had cannonaded and bombarded them for hours". Large timbers were thrown great distances, Shingles, a silk dress, a letter, and other papers were found up to 60 miles away from Viroqua, trees around a foot in diameter were "twisted as a man would twist a withe", and other young and sturdy trees were blown down and twisted into every imaginable shape.

The three-story local newspaper office suffered significant damage with the west end being lifted into the air and demolished. Debris from the newspaper office was thrown with extreme force, one siding board was thrown into a house located 250 yards (230 m) southeast of the office, and behind thick grove, penetrating into the upper floor and extending 1.5 feet (45 cm) into a room. A large two story house was lifted about 50 feet (15 m) into the air, landing a few rods south of its original location. A mother and child were inside the home, the child was left unharmed by the tornado, while the mother sustained serious but not life-threatening injuries. A large rock estimated to weigh around 10 tons was torn from a bluff and was moved several feet. A pitchfork was carried half a mile (800 m), and was found with its handle embedded into an oak stump. The tornado killed at least 10 people in Viroqua, and left the southern third of the city completely destroyed. William S. Purdy, who had served as state senator representing Vernon County in 1863, lost his home in the tornado. A servant girl who worked in his home was killed. His family only survived by lying on the ground as the house was lifted from its foundation.

After leaving Viroqua, the tornado continued tracking east-northeast at an estimated 60 miles per hour (100 km/h). As it continued, the tornado approached the Green Schoolhouse around 1.5 miles (2.4 km) east of Viroqua. Twenty-four students and one teacher were in attendance. The building was lifted into the air "and dashed to ground". The teacher was found horribly disfigured, succumbing to her injuries around an hour or two later. Between six and eight schoolchildren were either instantly killed, or succumbed to their injuries later that night or the next day.

The tornado continued eastward, destroying more homes, farms and a sawmill before weakening and lifting 6 miles (10 km) east of Viroqua. While most sources list a death toll of 17, historical tornado expert Thomas P. Grazulis lists it as 22 and states that as many as 12 others may have died later from their injuries. Additionally, more than 100 people were injured, with 22 injuries being serious. Damage was estimated at US$200,000 (1865). After the Viroqua tornado lifted, the supercell produced another tornado which caused minor damage near Rockton.

=== Fatalities ===
The Viroqua tornado killed at least 17 people. Ten of the fatalities occurred on First Street (modern day South Street), and at least seven others occurred at the Green Schoolhouse. Seventeen fatalities from the tornado, along with the victims’ ages, are listed below.

- John Gray Barstow (58)
- Tirzah Ann Barstow (42)
- Phinneas Drake Jr (81)
- Sarah Tresah Drake (71)
- Phinneas Rockwell Drake (36)
- Jennie S. Weeden (2)
- Lyndia A. Gillett (17)
- Caroline Salisbury Dean (62)
- Martha A. Moon (25)
- Eunice Y. White (18)
- Eliza Derby (12)
- Caroline M. Sands (8)
- Margaret E. Holter (11)
- Martha Jane Shaner (11)
- Alford Hobart Cooke (6)
- Mary Alice Rhoades (5)
- Eliza Brown Goode (27)

Grazulis lists a death toll of at least 22 based on History of Vernon County: 13 in Viroqua and 9 at the schoolhouse, with an additional 12 people possibly dying from their injuries later on.

== See also ==
- List of North American tornadoes and tornado outbreaks
