= Frank P. Coburn =

American politician (1858–1932)

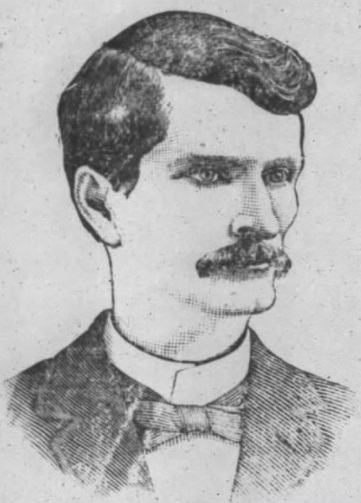
- The Weekly Leader (Eau Claire, Wis.), October 23, 1892

Member of the U.S. House of Representatives from Wisconsin's 7th district
- In office March 4, 1891 – March 3, 1893
- Preceded by: Ormsby B. Thomas
- Succeeded by: George B. Shaw

Personal details
- Born: Frank Potter Coburn; December 6, 1858 Barre, Wisconsin, U.S.
- Died: November 2, 1932 (aged 73) La Crosse, Wisconsin, U.S.
- Resting place: Hamilton Cemetery, West Salem, Wisconsin
- Party: Democratic
- Spouse: Minnie Gilfillan (m. 1890–1932)
- Children: Charles Mason Coburn^{(b. 1897; died 1954)}; Frances G. (Loyd)^{(b. 1899; died after 1954)}
- Occupation: Farmer, politician

Frank Potter Coburn (December 6, 1858 – November 2, 1932) was an American farmer, banker, and Democratic politician from La Crosse County, Wisconsin. He served one term in the U.S. House of Representatives, representing Wisconsin's 7th congressional district during the 52nd Congress (1891–1893). After serving in Congress, he served nine years on the La Crosse County Board of Supervisors, and was chairman in 1902 and 1903.

== Early life and education ==
Frank Coburn was born on December 6, 1858, on his family's farm in the town of Barre, in La Crosse County, Wisconsin. He was raised and educated there, attending the public schools, and went to work as a farmer.

== Career ==
Coburn engaged in agricultural pursuits near West Salem. He also engaged in the banking business.

Coburn was an unsuccessful Democratic candidate for election in 1888 to the 51st United States Congress.

Coburn served a single term in the United States House of Representatives, representing the 7th congressional district of Wisconsin as a Democrat in the 52nd United States Congress. His time in office began on March 4, 1891, and concluded on March 3, 1893.

Coburn was an unsuccessful candidate for re-election in 1892 to the 53rd United States Congress. He was defeated by his successor, Republican George B. Shaw, by a margin of 2,270 votes, or 7.2%.

Following his tenure in Congress, Coburn resumed banking interests and agricultural pursuits near West Salem. He served as a member of the county board of supervisors from 1894 to 1903, serving as chairman in 1902 and 1903. Coburn also served as jury commissioner from 1897 to 1932, trustee of the county asylum from 1907 to 1932, and a member of the board of review of income taxes for the county from 1912 to 1926.

== Death ==
Coburn died at the age of 73 in La Crosse, Wisconsin, on November 2, 1932. He was interred in Hamilton Cemetery, located in West Salem, Wisconsin.

== See also ==
- List of United States representatives who served a single term

U.S. House of Representatives
Preceded by Ormsby B. Thomas	Member of the U.S. House of Representatives from Wisconsin's 7th congressional district 1891–1893	Succeeded by George B. Shaw
