= Buel Hutchinson =

19th century American politician

Buel E. Hutchinson

Member of the Wisconsin Senate from the 30th district
- In office January 2, 1860 – January 6, 1862
- Preceded by: William H. Tucker
- Succeeded by: Norman S. Cate

Member of the Wisconsin State Assembly from the Dane 2nd district
- In office January 6, 1879 – January 5, 1880
- Preceded by: Edwin E. Bryant
- Succeeded by: Thomas Beattie

Member of the Wisconsin State Assembly from the Bad Ax–Crawford district
- In office January 5, 1857 – January 4, 1858
- Preceded by: Andrew Briggs
- Succeeded by: James R. Savage

District Attorney of Crawford County, Wisconsin
- In office April 1857 – January 3, 1859
- Appointed by: Coles Bashford
- Preceded by: Andrew C. Philips
- Succeeded by: Ormsby B. Thomas

Personal details
- Born: Buel Eldridge Hutchinson; November 26, 1826 Jefferson County, New York, U.S.
- Died: March 10, 1903 (aged 76) Chicago, Illinois, U.S.
- Resting place: Forest Hill Cemetery, Madison, Wisconsin
- Party: Republican
- Spouse: Mary A. Hutchinson
- Profession: Lawyer, politician

Military service
- Allegiance: United States
- Branch/service: United States Volunteers; Union Army
- Years of service: 1861–1863
- Rank: Captain, USV
- Battles/wars: American Civil War

Buel Eldridge Hutchinson (November 26, 1826 – March 10, 1903) was an American lawyer and Republican politician. He served two years in the Wisconsin State Senate and two years in the State Assembly. Some historical documents spell his first name Buell.

== Biography ==
Born in Jefferson County, New York, he was educated at Potsdam Academy. In 1848 he moved to Prairie du Chien, Wisconsin and was admitted to the Wisconsin bar in 1854. He served in the Wisconsin State Assembly in 1856 and 1878 and in the Wisconsin State Senate from 1860 to 1861. He was appointed district attorney of Crawford County in 1857 due to the resignation of the incumbent. During the American Civil War, Hutchinson served in the Union Army in the commissary. He moved to Madison, Wisconsin, where he served in the Wisconsin State Assembly for the second time. From 1882 to 1886, Hutchinson served as receiver of the United States Land Office in Aberdeen, Dakota Territory.

In 1901, Hutchinson moved to Chicago, Illinois, where he died on March 10, 1903. Some sources misstate his death year as 1902, but his death was formally announced in the March 13, 1903, edition of the Chicago Tribune.

Wisconsin State Assembly
Preceded by Andrew Briggs	Member of the Wisconsin State Assembly from the Bad Ax–Crawford district January 5, 1857 – January 4, 1858	Succeeded by James R. Savage
Preceded by Edwin E. Bryant	Member of the Wisconsin State Assembly from the Dane 2nd district January 6, 1879 – January 5, 1880	Succeeded by Thomas Beattie
Wisconsin Senate
Preceded by William H. Tucker	Member of the Wisconsin Senate from the 30th district January 2, 1860 – January 6, 1862	Succeeded by Norman S. Cate
Legal offices
Preceded by Andrew C. Philips	District Attorney of Crawford County, Wisconsin; April 1857 – January 3, 1859	Succeeded by Ormsby B. Thomas
