= Minnie C. T. Love =

American physician, suffragist (b. 1855, d. 1942)

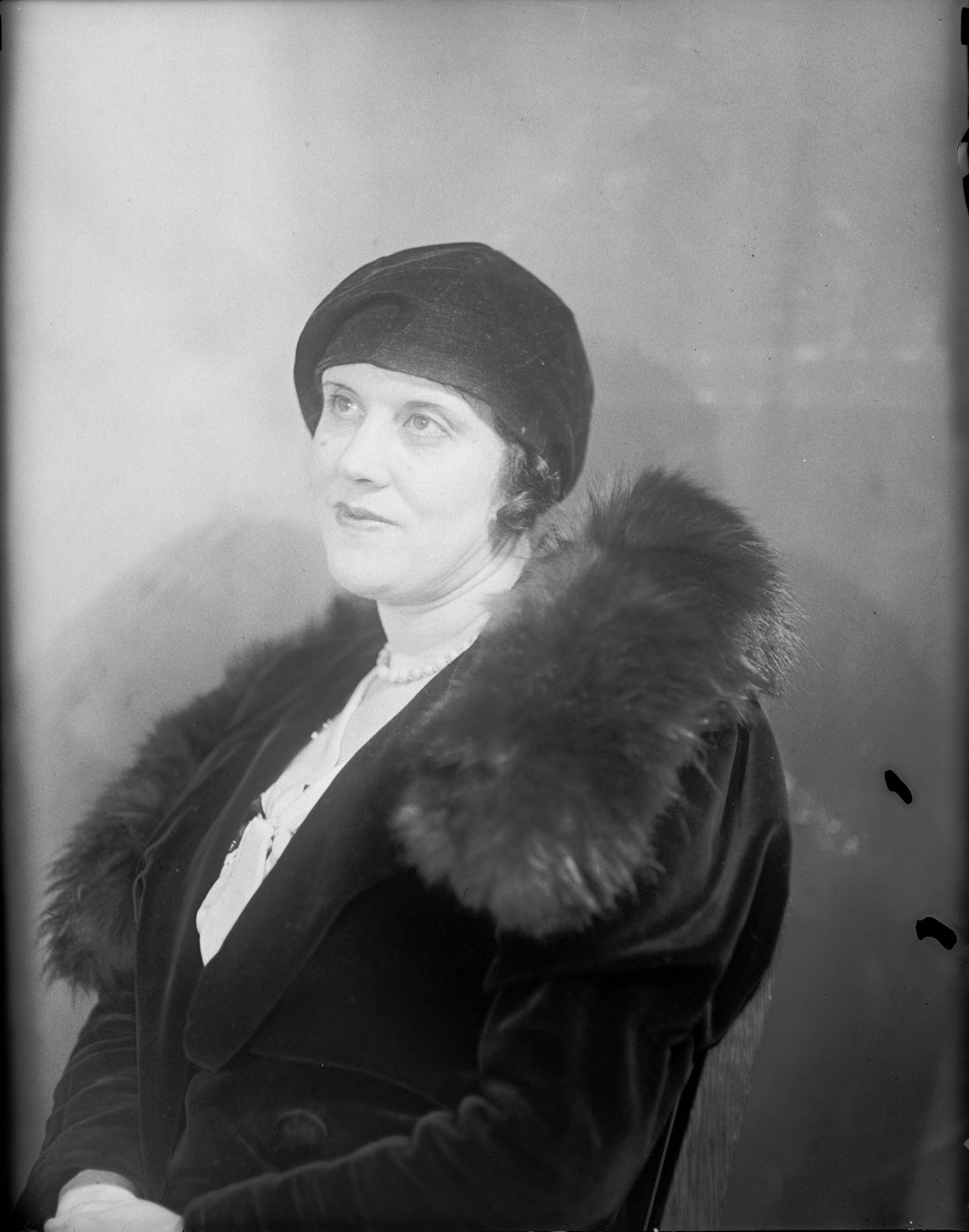

Member of the Colorado House of Representatives
- In office 1921, 1925

Personal details
- Born: Minnie Cecilia Francesca Tucker; November 9, 1855 La Crosse, Wisconsin, U.S.
- Died: May 13, 1942 (aged 86)
- Party: Republican
- Spouse: Charles Guerley Love (m. 1876; died 1907)
- Children: 3
- Parents: William H. Tucker (father); Elizabeth Letitia Roosevelt (mother)
- Relatives: Blanche Roosevelt (sister)
- Education: Howard University (MD)
- Profession: Physician

Minnie C. T. Love (born Minnie Cecilia Francesca Tucker; November 9, 1855 – May 13, 1942) was an American physician and politician from Denver, Colorado. She was an active suffragist, a member of the Colorado House of Representatives, and a member of the Women of the Ku Klux Klan.

== Early life and education ==
Minehaha Cecelia Tucker was born on November 9, 1855, in La Crosse, Wisconsin, to William Henry and Lizzie Letitia (Roosevelt) Tucker. Her sister, Blanche Roosevelt, was an opera singer and writer. Tucker married Charles Guerley Love on August 16, 1876, in Washington, D.C. The family moved to Denver, Colorado in the late 1870s, where Minnie C. T. Love became involved in the campaign for women's suffrage.

== Career ==
=== Medicine ===
Love studied medicine at Howard University College of Medicine. She spent 12 years as the Chief Physician of the Florence Crittenton Home in Denver, Colorado, and served on its board. She also helped to establish the Colorado State Industrial School for Girls, serving there as a state-appointed physician and board member. Love was also appointed to serve on the Colorado state board of health. In 1897, Love led the founding of the Babies Summer Hospital, later renamed the Children's Hospital.

=== Suffrage ===
Love was a member of the Equal Suffrage Association, as well as the Women's Christian Temperance Union and the Denver Women's Club. The latter club met at her house to discuss "the ideas of eugenics and better breeding."

=== Politics ===
Love was elected to the Colorado House of Representatives in 1921, where she served as chairman of the Committee on Medical Affairs and Public Health. She lost her reelection bid in 1922, but was reelected in 1924. While in office, she focused on family health and pre-natal care. She was an advocate for the forced sterilization of "epileptics and the insane."

== Involvement in the Ku Klux Klan ==
The Colorado Klan was founded by John Galen Locke in 1921 and headquartered in Denver. In December 1924, Meta L. Gremmels, Ester B. Hunt, and Denver Women's Club member Laurena H. Senter incorporated the Colorado chapter of the Women of the Ku Klux Klan. Minnie C. T. Love joined, holding the office of "excellent commander." (Note: For more on Love's participation in the Colorado Women of the Ku Klux Klan, see Robert Goldberg, Hooded Empire: The Ku Klux Klan in Colorado (1982) and Phil Goodstein, In the Shadow of the Clan: When the KKK Ruled Denver, 1920-1926 (2006).)

== Death ==
Minnie C. T. Love died on May 13, 1942.
