= Women of the Ku Klux Klan =

Branch of the American Ku Klux Klan

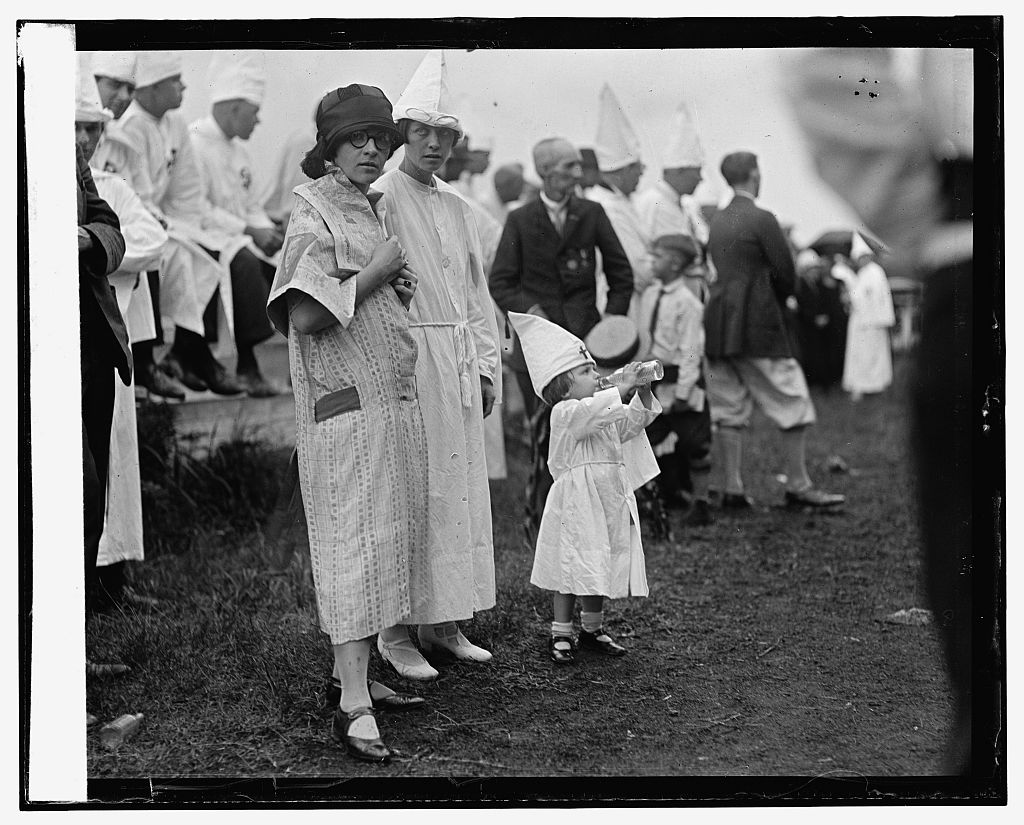
Jane Snyder attending KKK event, 8 September 1925

Women of the Ku Klux Klan (WKKK), also known as Women's Ku Klux Klan, and Ladies of the Invisible Empire, held to many of the same political and social ideas of the KKK but functioned as a separate branch of the national organization with their own actions and ideas. While most women focused on the moral, civic, and educational agendas of the Klan, they also had considerable involvement in issues of race, class, ethnicity, gender, and religion. The women of the WKKK fought for educational and social reforms like other Progressive reformers but with extreme racism and intolerance.

Particularly prominent in the 1920s, the WKKK existed in every state, but their strongest chapters were in Ohio, Pennsylvania, Indiana, and Arkansas. White, native-born, Protestant women over age 18 were allowed to join the Klan. Women of the Klan differed from Klansmen primarily in their political agenda to incorporate racism, nationalism, traditional morality, and religious intolerance into everyday life through mostly non-violent tactics.

== History ==
=== First wave ===
The first wave of the WKKK began in the mid-1860s. Co-founded by Rosie Chappell, it lasted ten years. Although women were not participating members, they were often used as a symbol of racial and sexual supremacy and were protected by the men of the KKK. Some women assisted with sewing Klan costumes and others let the men borrow their own clothes to serve as a disguise. One of the stated purposes of the Klan in the first wave was that "females, friends, widows, and their households shall ever be special objects of our regard and protection", which only referred to white women. Black and low-class white women, and white women judged as promiscuous were often the victims of rape and assault because Klansmen deemed them to be "lacking in virtue".

=== Second wave ===
The second wave began in the first half of the 1920s. In 1923, the Women of the Ku Klux Klan was formed as an auxiliary group of the Ku Klux Klan with its capital in Little Rock, Arkansas. The Women of the Ku Klux Klan eventually became independent of the Ku Klux Klan. After gaining independence, membership of WKKK was approx 125,000. Within four months, the WKKK claimed membership had doubled to 250,000 and by November 1923 thirty-six states had chapters of Women of the Ku Klux Klan. Like the Klan, they were anti-Jewish, anti-Catholic, anti-immigrant, and anti-black. Although they were not as violent as their male counterparts, the KKK, they sometimes resorted to violent tactics. Similar to the original Klan, the Women of the Ku Klux Klan published their own creed, or "Kreed", in 1927 that outlined the goals and beliefs of the organization. By the end of the decade, the Klan collapsed rapidly as a result of economic depression, internal battles, and financial scandals.

During the 1920s, the women helped the Ku Klux Klan expand their efforts throughout the country. The WKKK functioned separately from the KKK but it would join them in parades, social functions, and occasional meetings. To qualify for membership, one had to be a native-born, white Protestant woman. The WKKK drew its members from both rural and urban areas of the country.

Mary Elizabeth Tyler was an Atlanta public-relations professional who, along with Edward Young Clarke, founded the Southern Publicity Association. Their organization helped to turn the initially second Ku Klux Klan into a mass-membership organization with a broader social agenda. Elizabeth Tyler once stated, “the women’s organization will be on par with that of the men. We plan that all women who join us shall have equal rights with that of the men.” However, she also mentioned that “the women’s division...will not be in any sense a dependent auxiliary of the Ku Klux Klan. It will be a separate organization...bound to the parent organization.”

=== Third wave ===
Women played a minor role during the third wave, which occurred during the late 1960s and early 1970s. KKK members consisted largely of men living in the rural South who had little formal education or money. Much of their violence was aimed at African Americans. Women no longer played a prominent role as they were integrated into the Ku Klux Klan.

== Recruitment ==
During the wave of the 1920s, activism was strongest due to the efforts of women's suffrage. Many members were related to Klansmen. Some women joined the WKKK against the wishes of their husbands who felt it out of their partners' "wifely duty" and a rebellious attempt to increase her political power. Women also joined in an effort to preserve their white Protestant rights as they felt violated by the intrusion of immigrant and African-American voters. The WKKK hired "lecturers, organizers, and recruiters to establish new local chapters" where the KKK was especially successful. Some advertisements appealed to women by asking for their help in restoring America.

Many women joined the WKKK because they believed that it was their duty to protect their country from threats posed to it by minorities, which they believed included African Americans and immigrants. These women not only wanted to conform to the traditional familial roles of wives, mothers, sisters, and daughters, but they also wanted to assist the white supremacist movement. Some men were also looking for a way to get their wives involved in the movement and they pushed for the formation of a Women's Ku Klux Klan.

To promote their beliefs, the women used pamphlets with information about the WKKK which served as recruiting tools. Currently these pamphlets are used as research tools to see into the minds of the Klan's women since there is very little information about those involved due to security concerns within the group.

Today women are recruited to a much lesser extent than what once existed. Men hold the highest power, strongly limiting the rights of contemporary women in politics and propaganda.

== Activities ==
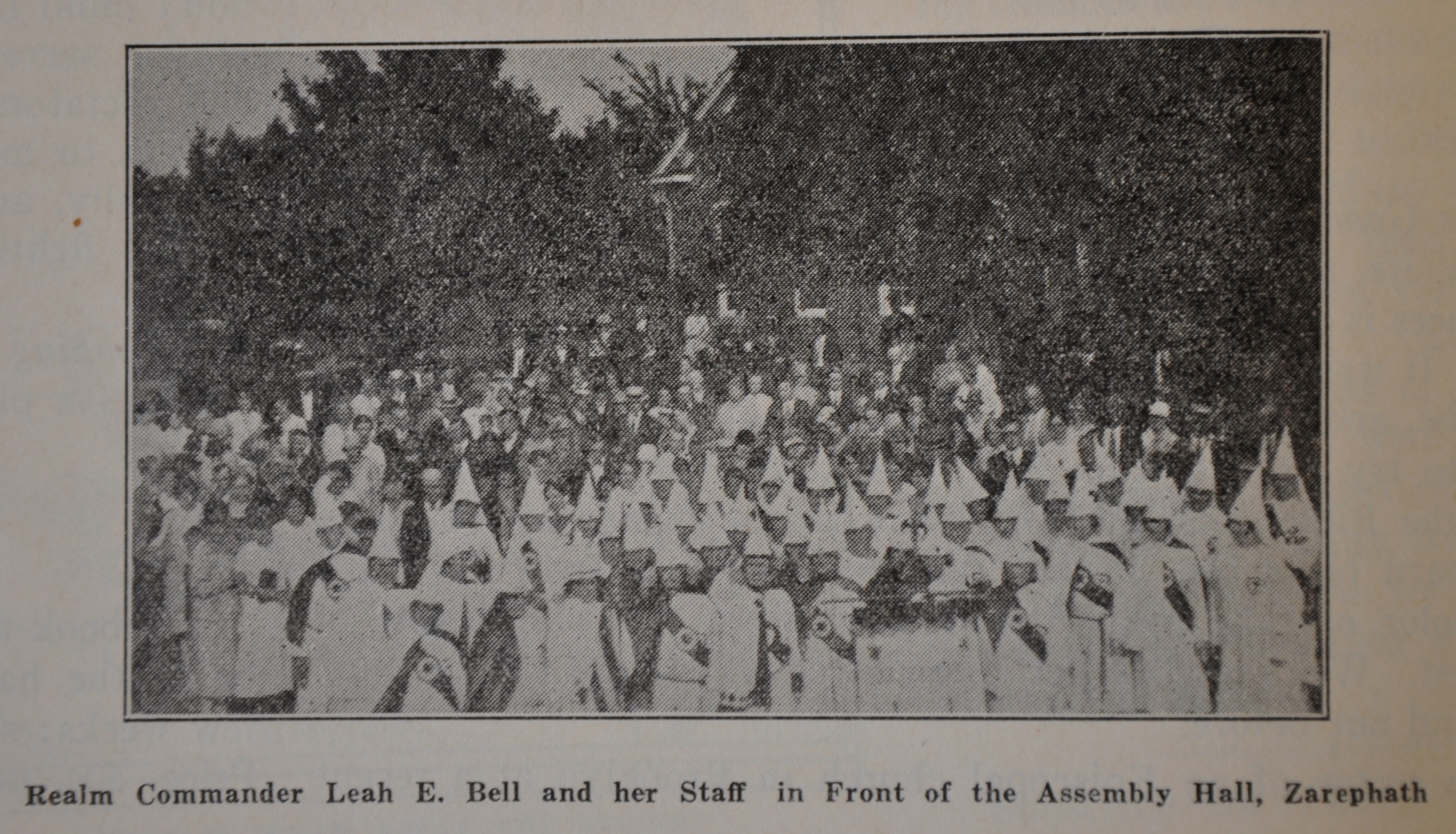
Klanswomen gather on August 31, 1929 in front of Assembly Hall, Zarephath, New Jersey, for "Patriotic Day" during the Pillar of Fire Church's annual Camp Meeting.

Dissimilar from the KKK, Klanswomen typically worked to strengthen the organisation, "led political assaults on non-Klan businesses", and worked to strengthen the base of the Klan. They organized rallies, festivals, and day-long ritual carnivals that involved parading through town, crossburning, and a series of lectures and speeches. They held boycotts against anti-Klan store owners. Klanswomen engaged in a number of rites of passage like Klan wedding services, christening ceremonies, and funeral services. Women of the Klan also worked to reform public schools, doing so by distributing Bibles in schools, working to have Catholic teachers fired, and running for positions on school board seats. In an effort to influence politics, Klanswomen would lobby voters and distribute negative reports on non-Klan member candidates.

== Conflict amongst Klan members ==
During the second wave, men and women had similar agendas but often faced conflicts regarding distribution of dues. A few situations regarding financial mismanagement and illegal practices were brought to court in Arkansas, Michigan, and Pennsylvania. Many men disagreed with allowing women into the Klan during the 1920s, because they felt it went against the beliefs of the Klan. Klansmen also disliked the ridicule they received from non-Klan members for allowing women to have a voice in politics and for bringing them outside the home, where they believed women belonged.

During the second wave of the WKKK, conflict arose when Alice b. Cloud of Dallas, Texas filed a lawsuit with two other Klan members against the head of the WKKK, Robbie Gill Comer, and her husband, claiming that they took funds from the WKKK and used them for personal use. Upon looking into the financial records of the WKKK, the court found that they had squandered almost $70,000 in funds for unnecessary renovations of the WKKK headquarters as well as for personal use. Women began to drop out of the WKKK and form other organizations of their own due to problems within the Klan, competing leadership, and financial corruption. Women were also concerned about the male Klan's increasing participation in acts of violence, and this caused them to leave the Klan.

Conflict arose during the modern wave regarding gender equity, because the Klan adheres to rules of "moral conservatism", such as its disbelief in divorce and its insistence that male authority should exist in politics as well as in the home. Many women in the modern Klan do not want their daughters to be a part of it, because they feel that women are not well respected.
