= Benjamin Bull =

American lawyer and politician

Benjamin Bull (January 1, 1798 – January 23, 1879) was an American lawyer and politician.

Born in Harper's Ferry, Virginia (now West Virginia), Bull moved with his parents to Xenia, Ohio. He went to school there, studied law and was admitted to the Ohio bar. He then moved to Martinsville, Indiana, in 1824, practiced law, and was a probate judge. In 1848 he moved to Mineral Point, Wisconsin and then to Grant County, Wisconsin where he practiced law. He then moved to Prairie du Chien, Wisconsin and practiced law. He served in the Wisconsin State Senate in 1865–1866 as a member of the National Union Party.
