= George Krouskop =

American politician

George Krouskop (May 12, 1832 – May 23, 1897), was a member of the Wisconsin State Senate.

== Biography ==
Krouskop was born in Bellefontaine, Ohio. He moved to Sextonville, Wisconsin. Krouskop is buried in Richland Center, Wisconsin.

== Career ==
Krouskop was a member of the Senate twice. First, from 1870 to 1871 and second, from 1874 to 1875. He was a Democrat.
