= Matthew H. Carpenter =

American politician (1824–1881)

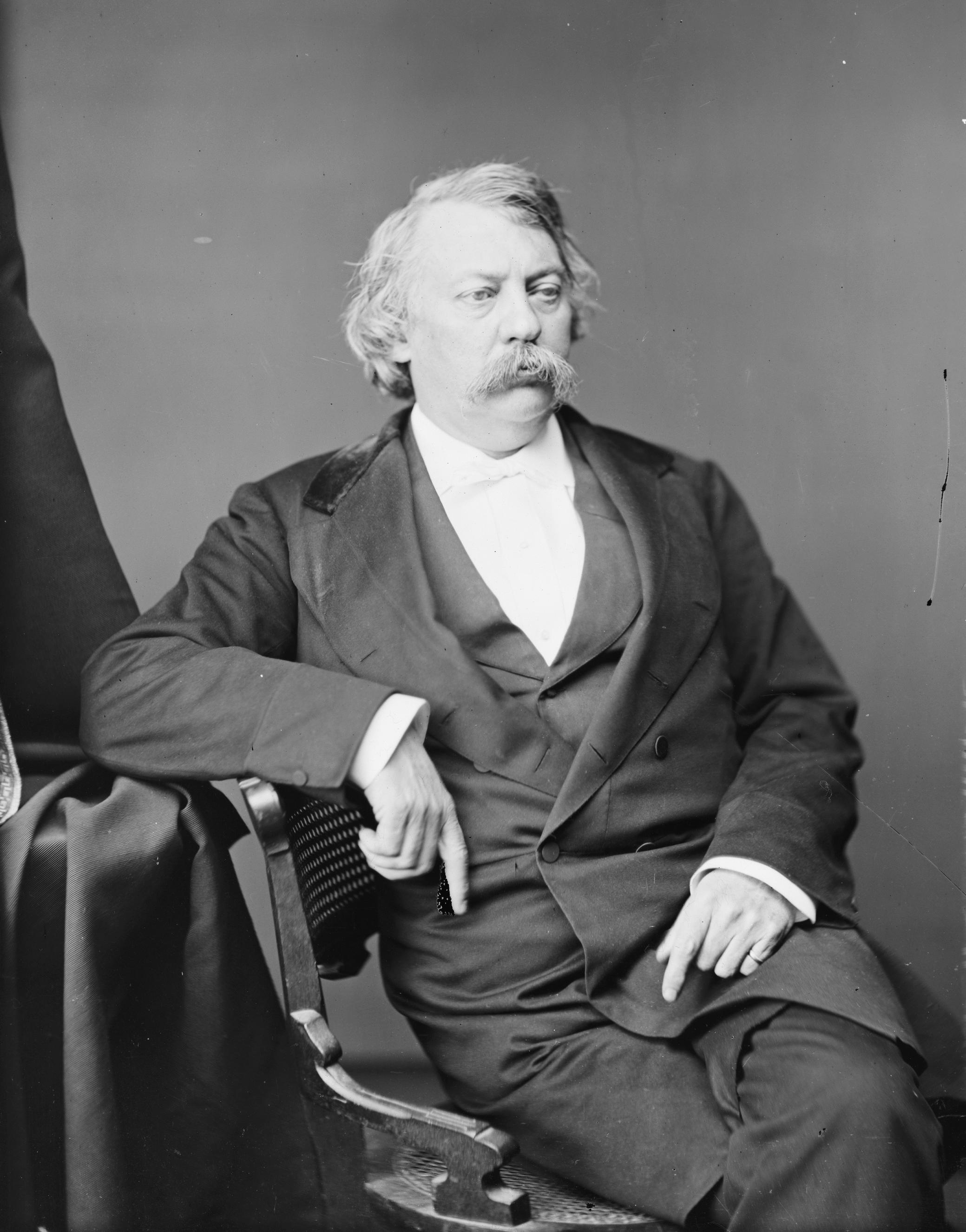
- Carpenter, 1865–1880

President pro tempore of the United States Senate
- In office March 12, 1873 – January 4, 1875
- Preceded by: Henry B. Anthony
- Succeeded by: Henry B. Anthony

United States Senator from Wisconsin
- In office March 4, 1879 – February 24, 1881
- Preceded by: Timothy O. Howe
- Succeeded by: Angus Cameron
- In office March 4, 1869 – March 3, 1875
- Preceded by: James R. Doolittle
- Succeeded by: Angus Cameron

Personal details
- Born: Decatur Merritt Hammond Carpenter; December 22, 1824 Moretown, Vermont, U.S.
- Died: February 24, 1881 (aged 56) Washington, D.C., U.S.
- Resting place: Forest Home Cemetery, Milwaukee, Wisconsin, U.S.
- Party: Republican
- Other political affiliations: Democratic
- Spouse: Caroline Dillingham Carpenter (m. 1855)
- Relations: Paul Dillingham (father in law); William P. Dillingham (brother in law)
- Children: 2
- Education: United States Military Academy
- Profession: Attorney

Matthew Hale Carpenter (born Decatur Merritt Hammond Carpenter; December 22, 1824 – February 24, 1881) was an American lawyer, politician, and Wisconsin pioneer. He represented Wisconsin for eight years as a United States senator, from 1869 to 1875 and again from 1879 until his death in 1881. He was recognized as an authority on constitutional law, and made some of the most important legal arguments of 19th-century America, presenting several cases before the United States Supreme Court involving such matters as states' rights and regulation of corporations; during the American Civil War, he argued many important cases establishing the legal framework for President Abraham Lincoln's war powers and the postwar Reconstruction Acts.

Originally a Democrat, he evolved into a Republican during the Civil War, and helped perpetuate the party's political machinery in Wisconsin. His sustained support for President Ulysses S. Grant's administration despite allegations of corruption lost him the backing of reformers, and his legal arguments in favor of Democratic candidate Samuel J. Tilden in the disputed presidential election of 1876 outraged many Republicans. A gifted orator, he was dubbed "the Webster of the West."

== Background and education ==
Carpenter was born in Moretown, Vermont, in the Mad River Valley of the Green Mountain range. His pioneering forebears were English, and came to America soon after the Pilgrims. His grandfather Cephas Carpenter (1770–1860) helped establish Moretown, owned a store, served as a colonel in the militia and took part in the War of 1812. Cephas Carpenter served in local office including justice of the peace, and though not a member of the bar, possessed wisdom and eloquence that led to a career as an advocate in the local courts.

His son Ira Carpenter (1798–1862) was chiefly a farmer, but he also gained prominence through positions such as justice of the peace, postmaster and state legislator.

Grandson Merritt displayed intelligence and oratorical talents at an early age, impressing people with his abilities to recite Cicero and exhort at religious revivals. He also displayed an aversion to physical work.

After an explosive argument with a schoolmaster, the 13-year-old Carpenter was expelled from school. He was dissatisfied with the limits of Moretown, and left home to live and study law under the tutelage of family friend (and future Vermont governor) Paul Dillingham in nearby Waterbury. For four years Carpenter attended the local grade school while absorbing Dillingham's law library. Having received an appointment to the United States Military Academy through Vermont Congressman John Mattocks, Carpenter continued his studies, but he disliked military life and resigned in August 1845, citing poor health.

He returned to live in Dillingham's home and managed his law office while Dillingham was then a congressman in Washington, D.C. Upon Carpenter's admission to the Vermont bar in November 1847 Dillingham offered to make him his law partner, but Carpenter declined so he could further his law studies under Rufus Choate of Boston. Choate was also impressed with Carpenter, and after a few months he too offered him a partnership, but Carpenter sought to make a name and career for himself in the West.

== Wisconsin attorney ==
After reading that the territory of Wisconsin had passed its constitution and was soon to become a state, Carpenter chose to migrate west and begin his career as a lawyer in Beloit on the endorsement of that spot by the New England Emigrating Society's Dr. Horace C. White. Arriving in June 1848, Carpenter quickly established a reputation as a successful and affordable attorney, attracting much acclaim from the local community.

His practice was interrupted by a painful inflammation of his eyes which rendered him blind. After traveling to New York to seek treatment, his sight gradually recovered after a year as he convalesced in the Waterbury home of his mentor Dillingham. Before returning to Wisconsin he became engaged to Dillingham's daughter Catherine, and they married five years later.

In 1850 Carpenter returned to resume his law practice in Beloit using a new name, Matthew (Matt) Hale Carpenter, after Sir Matthew Hale, the noted English jurist of the 17th century. Despite an earlier warning from Choate to steer clear of politics, Carpenter successfully ran for Rock County district attorney, serving from 1850 to 1852 and 1854 to 1856. He was a Democrat in the tradition of Thomas Jefferson and Andrew Jackson, but he disdained the party's pro-slavery platform while also rejecting Whig Party notions of opposing slavery based on "higher law"—the idea that individual belief of right and wrong permitted an individual to violate objectionable statutes and ordinances. After appearing to lose a close election for another term as Rock County district attorney in 1854, Carpenter successfully argued that courts could look beyond election board certifications and re-examine voter returns, resulting in the election being overturned.

== Gardner v. Tisdale ==
In 1855, Carpenter discovered that many Beloit residents did not hold legal title to their land because it was sold to them by someone who had pre-empted the land but had not received official title from the government (Congress had previously outlawed the pre-emption of non-agricultural land). Carpenter put forth the theory that the original pre-emptor was still technically the owner of the property. After several complicated transactions, some of which included Paul Dillingham selling new titles to the landowners, and appeals as far as the United States Supreme Court, which included participation by Dillingham, Rufus Choate, Abraham Lincoln and other prominent attorneys, Carpenter's legal theory was rejected in a similar case, so the Wisconsin case was withdrawn.

== Barstow-Bashford election dispute ==
Wisconsin's gubernatorial election of 1855 was thrown into doubt when incumbent Democratic governor William A. Barstow was ruled the 157-vote victor over Republican Coles Bashford by a board of canvassers friendly to Barstow. Discrepancies were discovered in the election returns and political tensions rose as both parties claimed the office and swore in their candidates. Hired by Barstow, Carpenter stalled by repeatedly postponing the case before the state supreme court. He claimed that they held no jurisdiction because elections were matters of the executive branch, which had ruled Barstow the winner. Nevertheless, the court did claim jurisdiction and the ability to examine election tallies (as Carpenter had previously argued for his own election for district attorney). Barstow then resigned, elevating Lieutenant Governor Arthur MacArthur to the governorship. After the court ruled that Bashford was the rightful governor, MacArthur gave up the office. Barstow subsequently refused to pay Carpenter his fee.

Despite his defeat Carpenter had demonstrated his legal prowess to the state. A high volume of his cases required his presence in federal court in Milwaukee, leading to him locating his practice there in 1858. He was also coaxed there by Democratic party boss Josiah Noonan, who arranged a law partnership between Carpenter and Edward G. Ryan, another highly regarded attorney and a force in the state Democratic Party. Despite their excellent credentials, they proved to be temperamentally incompatible, and ended their partnership the next year. Among the prospective attorneys who studied law under Carpenter in Milwaukee was Lyman W. Redington.

By the time Carpenter moved to Milwaukee he had become adept in the area of railroad litigation and sued many railroads on behalf of investors left holding bonds made worthless by fraudulent manipulation. His debut before the U.S. Supreme Court resulted in his winning a judgment against the La Crosse and Milwaukee Railroad Company. He was also successful as part of a team of lawyers defending abolitionist Sherman Booth from a charge of rape.

== Loyal Democrat during the Civil War ==
Carpenter supported Democrat Stephen Douglas in the 1860 presidential election, viewing Republican Abraham Lincoln as an honest but incompetent sectional candidate. Yet, he warned those in his party that he saw secession as treason, and he would be "the first man to raise a musket" in defense of the Constitution. Following the Confederates' attack on Fort Sumter in 1861, Carpenter did not enlist but became a rousing speaker in support of the Union cause.

While he saw that many federal actions would be unconstitutional in peacetime, he reasoned that arbitrary arrests and suspensions of habeas corpus were acts of self-preservation during wartime and thereby permitted. He also became an early advocate for emancipation, but only as a war measure rather than an act of humanity. Excluded from meetings of the Democratic leadership, Carpenter joined other like-minded party members of the "Loyal Democracy" in considering a third party in Wisconsin, but nothing came of it.

Personal letters he had written saying Lincoln was "idiotic" found their way into newspapers, but Carpenter supported him for re-election in 1864 by making numerous pro-Union and pro-Lincoln speeches.

== Defining the Reconstruction Acts ==
Carpenter was the key attorney in a series of landmark cases before the U.S. Supreme Court which helped define states' rights by determining the legality of the Reconstruction acts passed by Congress.

Ex parte Garland dealt with the disbarment from federal courts of Southern lawyers who refused to take an oath swearing they had not taken up arms or assisted the Confederacy. Carpenter argued that the act passed on January 24, 1865, was ex post facto (the war had since ended) and a bill of attainder (it punished without a trial). In December 1865 the court upheld his argument with the majority opinion employing phrases from Carpenter's brief.

Ex parte McCardle concerned the legal authority of the occupying Union Army. Confederate Colonel William H. McCardle, the editor of the Vicksburg Times, was charged with defying military authority by inciting rebellion, libeling federal officials, and intimidating voters. After the circuit court denied him a writ of habeas corpus, McCardle appealed to the Supreme Court of the United States. Carpenter argued that the court lacked jurisdiction over a president's official acts, as in a similar case of his, Georgia vs. Grant. Rather than claiming the Union's "right of conquest," Carpenter said the Southern states had surrendered their constitutional protections when they had seceded, essentially reverting to territories.

After he concluded his eloquent arguments, Secretary of War Edwin Stanton hugged him, declaring "Carpenter, you have saved us!" Even McCardle's attorney Jeremiah S. Black lauded him as "the first Constitutional lawyer in the country." However, Radical Republicans in Congress feared that the reconstruction acts would be ruled unconstitutional, so they quickly pushed through a law repealing the Habeas Corpus Act of 1867, barring jurisdiction in pending cases and preventing a clear decision from being rendered by the court.

In the Slaughter-house cases Carpenter represented the Crescent City Livestock Landing and Slaughterhouse Company, which had been granted a monopoly on all slaughterhouse business in New Orleans by the carpetbag state legislature of Louisiana in 1869. Butchers and cattle dealers thrown out of work by the law obtained an injunction from a district court, claiming they had been denied equal protection under the Fourteenth Amendment and deprived of property under the due process clause. Making a plea for states' rights, Carpenter contended that the amendment had been intended solely to elevate African Americans and had no bearing on economic statutes passed by a state. He also warned of too many powers being centralized in the federal government. The court concurred in Carpenter's narrowing of the scope of the Fourteenth Amendment.

In Bradwell vs. Illinois, Carpenter sought to broaden the amendment's protections in the case of the editor of the Chicago Legal News, Myra Bradwell, who had been denied admission to the bar of the Illinois Supreme Court because she was a woman. Representing Bradwell, Carpenter argued that no class of people could be excluded from practicing the legal profession. The federal court disagreed, questioning the propriety of ruling on a state's qualifications for admission to the bar.

These cases brought Carpenter handsome fees, national acclaim, and much derision from the losing factions. He'd also won the support of Stanton and President Ulysses S. Grant, who both urged him to run as a Republican for the U.S. Senate.

== Republican senator ==
Following the Civil War Carpenter's transformation from a Jeffersonian Democrat into a Republican was complete. Despite reports that he backed President Andrew Johnson's policies, he made speeches supporting the Radical congress. He called for the enfranchisement of African-American men and invited members of the Loyal Democracy to join the Republicans, as he himself did in the summer of 1867 with his support for Governor Lucius Fairchild's re-election.

With high-profile backing Carpenter ran successfully for the senate seat occupied by James R. Doolittle, a "Johnsonized" Republican who had fallen out of favor with his party. With his victory he solidified his status with the "Madison Regency," a Republican group that included former governor and Johnson's Postmaster General Alexander Randall, Madison postmaster Elisha W. Keyes and Wisconsin State Journal editor and Republican state central committee chairman Horace Rublee. After Rublee was appointed minister to Switzerland by President Grant, Keyes became party chairman and closely coordinated with Carpenter to distribute federal patronage jobs to political allies.

Once in the Senate, Carpenter moderated his views to the degree that he became one of the spokesmen of the emerging Stalwart Republicans. He opposed any "fundamental conditions" placed on states wishing to be readmitted to the Union, and favored blanket amnesty for former Confederates. Carpenter was known as one of the staunchest supporters of the Grant administration. In the Senate he presented an unabashed defense of political patronage, mocking the idea of civil service reform. Carpenter would garner a reputation for his oratory skills as a member of the Senate, including with a return to Beloit in 1869. At Beloit College, he gave a foreign policy speech that has been deemed particularly historically significant.

He also feuded with Liberal Republican senators Charles Sumner and Carl Schurz over many issues. He delivered a sarcastic denunciation of Sumner's wide-reaching civil rights amendment to the Confederate amnesty bill. As the chair of an investigating committee he also debunked Sumner and Schurz's claim that the War Department had broken its neutrality when it sold outmoded rifles to France during the Franco-Prussian War. Despite such skirmishes Carpenter was a respected figure in the senate, being elected president pro tempore by his colleagues in 1871. He also served as chairman of the Committee on Enrolled Bills (42nd Congress) and the committee to Audit and Control the Contingent Expense (42nd and 43rd Congresses).

As part of another committee inquiry, Carpenter went to Louisiana to investigate election claims in order to determine the rightful governor of the contested state. His report was highly critical of both factions, but he urged the recognition of Republican governor William P. Kellogg. Years later Carpenter's impartiality was called into question when personal letters revealed a close relationship between the two, including a "desperately short" Carpenter asking Kellogg for a $1,000 loan.

== Drawing fire from press and party ==
As Carpenter's influence grew within the Grant administration, so did the condemnations from the press. One of his Senate investigations resulted in two journalists being jailed for not divulging the source of a leaked treaty. Opposition newspapers like the New York Tribune responded by not only criticizing Carpenter's methods, but by also condemning his moral character by bringing his private life into question. Later in his term editors accused Carpenter of trying to effectively "gag" newspapers by advancing a bill that would allow judicial process to be served upon the agents (i.e. interviewers) of persons involved in civil suits.

In 1873, Carpenter angered many in his own party by taking positions that ran counter to the stalwart doctrine. In a spirit of reform he boldly owned up to administration excesses such as the Credit Mobilier and the "Salary Grab," defending them in a speech in Janesville. In a speech at Ripon he denounced the railroads, insisting they were public highways paid for with government land grants. He also stated his belief that the government has a right as well as a duty to regulate corporations.

Wishing to make the Milwaukee Sentinel into a more reliable organ for the state Republican party, Carpenter and other backers bought the paper and forced out editor Alexander M. Thomson, who had been instrumental in getting Carpenter elected senator. Thomson was now deemed too critical of the party machine. His ousting made him a lifelong enemy of Carpenter. The Sentinel soon was seen as Carpenter's personal mouthpiece.

Despite the incessant criticism, Carpenter was seen as being easily re-elected in 1875. Nevertheless, a surprise bolt by disgruntled Republicans combined with votes by calculating Democrats resulted in the election of Angus Cameron, a La Crosse Republican.

== Out of office and under scrutiny ==
In 1875, Carpenter was implicated in the Whiskey Ring scandal that funneled federal liquor tax revenues to some states' Republican parties. Although he was close to key participants in the Milwaukee ring, no evidence emerged to prove his involvement.

During this time Carpenter, along with Jeremiah S. Black and Montgomery Blair, was also defending Grant's Secretary of War William W. Belknap against charges that he had accepted money in exchange for the appointment of a post trader. Despite Belknap's immediate resignation, outraged House Democrats proceeded with his impeachment. Carpenter portrayed Belknap as the hapless victim of a social-climbing wife, but his legal victory relied on his assertion that jurisdiction over Belknap ended with his resignation.

Also in 1875, Carpenter was defense counsel for officials of the Miners’ National Association (MNA) in an important labor case that sought to apply the legal concept of conspiracy to union picketing and organization efforts. The case grew out of a coal miners' strike in Clearfield County, Pennsylvania, which was supported by the MNA, then numerically one of the largest American trade unions. First over fifty of the striking workers were tried upon a charge of criminal conspiracy and thirty-six of them were convicted with some sentenced to jail, although they appeared to have been guilty of no more than peaceful picketing. Then John Siney, the president of the MNA, and Xingo Parks, one of the union's best organizers, were tried on the same charge. Siney was acquitted, but Parks convicted, although pardoned shortly thereafter.

Following the disputed presidential election of 1876, Carpenter was hired by supporters of the Democratic candidate Samuel J. Tilden to examine Louisiana's vote counts and argue for victory over Republican Rutherford B. Hayes. Carpenter's first-hand accounts of the corrupt Republican state administration gave the Democrats some reason for hope, but ultimately the partisan make-up of the special electoral commission (7 Republicans, 6 Democrats) and its refusal to look behind the certified counts made many of their rulings a forgone conclusive win for Hayes.

== Return to the senate ==
Despite ongoing press criticism and declining health, in 1878 Carpenter launched a bid for the senate seat occupied by Republican Timothy Howe. With the help of a strong lobby, he won over enough votes in the legislature to prevail over state party boss (and former friend) Elisha W. Keyes.

Carpenter's second term as senator lacked the political drama of his Reconstruction years. He spoke in favor of President Rutherford B. Hayes's maintenance of federal troops at southern polling places. He also vigorously opposed the Democrats' proposed pardoning of General Fitz-John Porter for ignoring General John Pope's orders at Manassas in 1863, arguing that the power of pardon resides solely with the president. Carpenter remained a loyal supporter of President Grant in his quest for a third term, igniting bitter debates between Carpenter and White House aspirant Senator James G. Blaine of Maine.

== Death ==
While Carpenter's evident declining health was attributed to his indulgent lifestyle, he also suffered from the lung congestion of Bright's disease. After a cycle of relapses and recoveries he died on February 24, 1881, at his Washington, D.C., home surrounded by friends and family. He was buried at Forest Home Cemetery in Milwaukee.

== Family ==
In 1855 Carpenter married Caroline Dillingham, the daughter of Paul Dillingham. They were the parents of four children. Daughters Ada and Annie were born and died in 1860. The other two lived to adulthood—a daughter named Lilian (1857–1942) and a son named Paul Dillingham Carpenter (1867–1932). Paul D. Carpenter was an attorney in Milwaukee and also served as judge of the county court.

== See also ==
- List of members of the United States Congress who died in office (1790–1899)

== Notes ==
U.S. Senate
Preceded by James R. Doolittle	U.S. senator (Class 1) from Wisconsin; March 4, 1869 – March 3, 1875; Served alongside: Timothy O. Howe	Succeeded by Angus Cameron
Preceded by Henry B. Anthony	President pro tempore of the United States Senate; March 12, 1873 – January 4, 1875	Succeeded by Henry B. Anthony
Preceded by Timothy O. Howe	U.S. senator (Class 3) from Wisconsin; March 4, 1879 – February 24, 1881; Served alongside: Angus Cameron	Succeeded by Angus Cameron
