= 1881 United States Senate special election in Wisconsin =

- March 9, 1881 – March 10, 1881
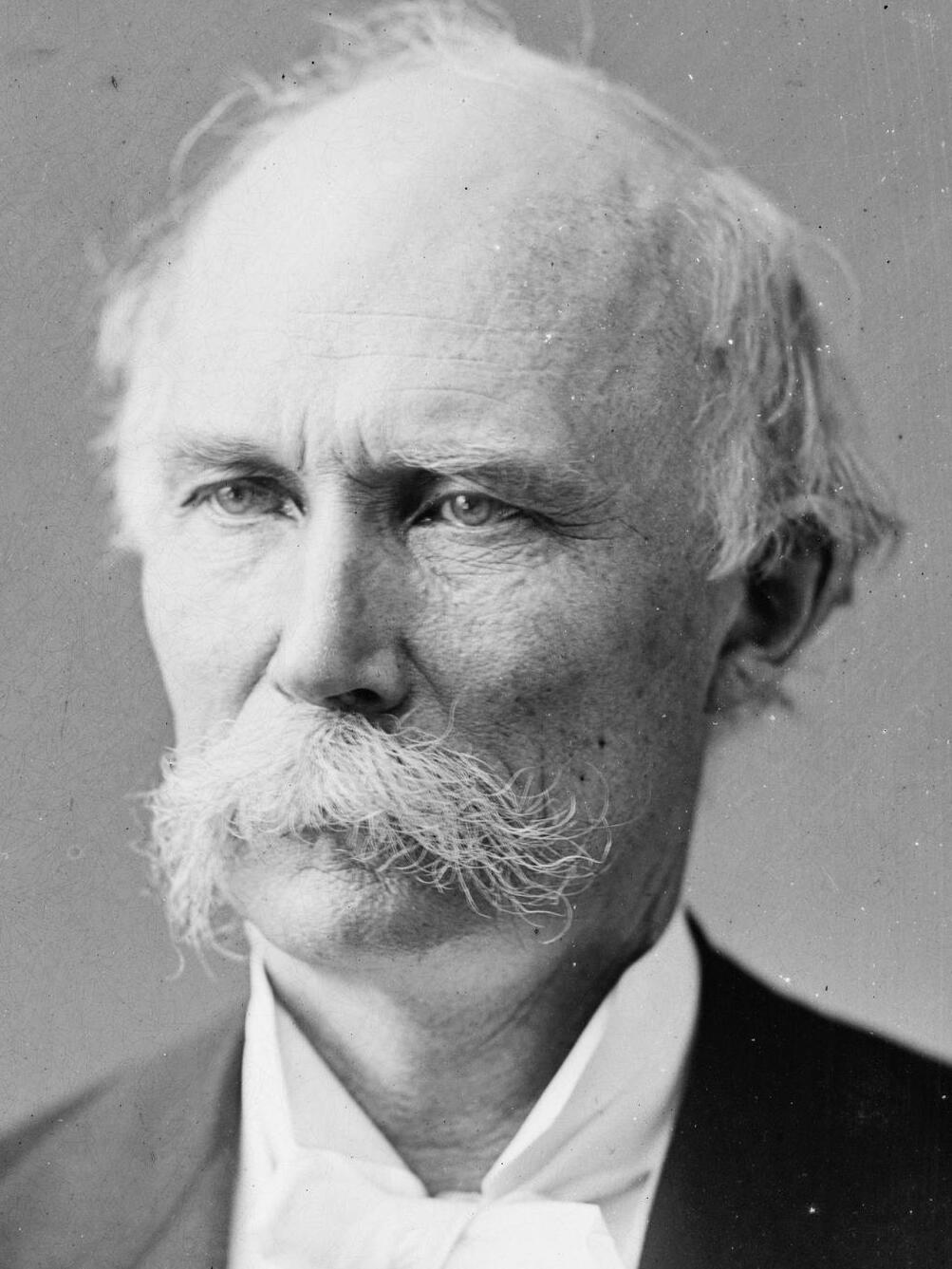

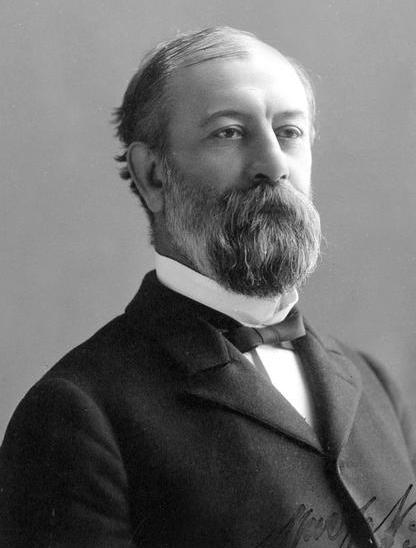
Nominee	Angus Cameron	William F. Vilas
Party	Republican	Democratic
Legislative vote	97	27
Percentage	78.23%	21.77%
U.S. senator before election
Matthew H. Carpenter
Republican
Elected U.S. Senator
Angus Cameron
Republican

The 1881 United States Senate special election in Wisconsin was held in the 34th Wisconsin Legislature between March 9, 1881, and March 10, 1881. The special election was necessary to complete the unexpired term of U.S. Senator Matthew H. Carpenter, who died February 24, 1881. Former U.S. Senator Angus Cameron, who did not seek re-election in 1881 and left office just days before the special election, was elected to succeed Carpenter.

In the 1881 term, Republicans held overwhelming majorities in both chambers of the Wisconsin Legislature, so had more than enough votes to elect a Republican United States senator. The main contest was in the Republican legislative caucus, where former U.S. senator Angus Cameron outlasted Wisconsin Republican Party boss Elisha W. Keyes, taking the nomination on the 48th ballot.

== Major candidates ==
=== Democratic ===
- William F. Vilas, prominent lawyer and professor of law at the University of Wisconsin.

=== Republican ===
- Angus Cameron, former U.S. senator, former speaker of the Wisconsin State Assembly, former state senator from La Crosse.
- Luther S. Dixon, former chief justice of the Wisconsin Supreme Court
- Elisha W. Keyes, head of the "Madison Regency" political machine and de-facto head of the Republican Party of Wisconsin throughout this era, former mayor of Madison.

== Results ==
=== Republican nomination ===
Within days of the death of U.S. Senator Matthew H. Carpenter, political endorsements began appearing in Wisconsin newspapers for candidates to succeed him. Elisha W. Keyes, one of the most powerful Wisconsin Republicans of the era, made his third bid for the Republican nomination after failing to secure the seat in 1879 and the regular 1881 election. Former senator Angus Cameron had just declined to seek re-election in the regular 1881 election, but after receiving the support by many of Senator Carpenter's former allies, he consented to run for the nomination. Carpenter had significant support from the northern parts of the states. The Milwaukee delegation was divided between Carpenter and former chief justice Luther S. Dixon.

The Republican legislative caucus convened on March 7, 1881, and proceeded to an informal poll of legislators. Cameron held a slight lead, but was 8 votes short of a majority; Keyes and Dixon trailed behind by about 10 and 20 votes respectively. After five rounds of formal voting, the numbers remained stuck at approximately the same levels. The caucus adjourned until later that evening, when they took 23 more ballots; Cameron's count crept to within six votes of the majority. The caucus reconvened on March 8 and took 16 more ballots, support for Keyes and Dixon faded, and dark horse candidate Joseph V. Quarles briefly rose into 2nd place. Two more ballots were taken on the morning of March 9, showing no progress. The caucus adjourned again, during that break, supporters of Keyes and Dixon and others attempted to rally behind businessman and former legislator Jonathan Bowman. At the March 9 evening session, Cameron and Bowman were nearly tied; Cameron finally reached a majority by one vote on the 48th ballot.

=== Vote on March 9, 1881 ===
The legislature met in joint session on March 9, 1881, to elect a U.S. senator. This joint session occurred before the Republican caucus reached consensus on their nomination that evening, thus the vote resulted in no majority.

1st Vote of the 34th Wisconsin Legislature, March 9, 1881
Party	Candidate	Votes	%
Republican	Angus Cameron	41	32.80%
Democratic	William F. Vilas	26	20.80%
Republican	Luther S. Dixon	18	14.40%
Republican	Elisha W. Keyes	15	12.00%
Republican	Charles G. Williams	13	10.40%
Republican	George Cochrane Hazelton	7	5.60%
Republican	Jonathan Bowman	2	1.60%
Republican	James M. Bingham	1	0.80%
Republican	Charles L. Colby	1	0.80%
Republican	Joseph V. Quarles	1	0.80%
	Absent or not voting	8	
Majority		63	50.40%
Total votes		125	93.98%
Void election result

=== Vote on March 10, 1881 ===
The legislature returned to joint session to vote again on March 10, 1881, with nine members absent. Voting went exactly along party lines, with Cameron receiving the votes of all Republicans in attendance, and winning the election.

2nd Vote of the 34th Wisconsin Legislature, March 10, 1881
Party	Candidate	Votes	%
Republican	Angus Cameron	97	78.23%
Democratic	William F. Vilas	27	21.77%
	Absent or not voting	9	
Majority		63	50.81%
Total votes		124	93.23%
Republican hold			
