= Dugald D. Cameron =

19th century American politician and physician

Member of the Wisconsin State Assembly
- In office January 5, 1857 – January 4, 1858
- Preceded by: district established
- Succeeded by: James DeMott Condit
- Constituency: La Crosse–Monroe
- In office January 7, 1856 – January 5, 1857
- Preceded by: Chase A. Stevens
- Succeeded by: district abolished
- Constituency: Buffalo–Chippewa–La Crosse

Personal details
- Born: May 14, 1826 Caledonia, New York, U.S.
- Died: August 6, 1867 (aged 41) La Crosse, Wisconsin, U.S.
- Cause of death: Suicide (drowning)
- Resting place: Oak Grove Cemetery, La Crosse
- Party: Republican
- Spouse: none
- Children: none
- Relatives: Angus Cameron (brother)

Military service
- Allegiance: United States
- Branch/service: United States Volunteers; Union Army
- Years of service: 1861–1862
- Rank: Surgeon
- Unit: 14th Reg. Wis. Vol. Infantry
- Battles/wars: American Civil War: Battle of Shiloh

Dugald Dudley Cameron (Note: During his lifetime, his first name was always spelled "Dugald", but his gravestone and some contemporary documents spell it as "Dougald".) (May 14, 1826 – August 6, 1867) was a Scottish American medical doctor, politician, and Wisconsin pioneer. He was one of the earliest settlers at what is now La Crosse, Wisconsin. He was a member of the Wisconsin State Assembly, representing La Crosse County during the 1856 and 1857 terms. He was a younger brother of U.S. senator Angus Cameron.

== Biography ==
Dugald Cameron was born in Caledonia, New York, in 1826. He was trained as a physician and came west to Wisconsin sometime before 1851, settling in the area that is now La Crosse. Dugald was active in civic and political affairs in La Crosse, and became part of the Republican Party when that party was organized in the mid-1850s. He was one of the earliest Republicans elected to the Wisconsin State Assembly, serving in the 1856 session. His district at that time comprised La Crosse, Buffalo, and Chippewa counties, but those counties then contained much more territory than their modern versions, and the district comprised nearly all of the territory south of modern Bayfield County, east of Pierce County, west of Marathon County, and north of Vernon County. During the 1856 term, a redistricting act was passed by the Legislature; in the fall, Cameron was re-elected to a second term in a new district, comprising La Crosse and Monroe counties, then much more closely-resembling their modern boundaries.

At the outbreak of the American Civil War, Cameron volunteered for service as a surgeon for the Union Army. He was enrolled as 1st assistant surgeon for the 14th Wisconsin Infantry Regiment when the regiment was organized in the fall of 1861. The 14th Wisconsin Infantry mustered into federal service on January 30, 1862, and went south to St. Louis in March. Shortly after arriving, they were assigned to attach to Ulysses S. Grant's Army of the Tennessee, and participated in the bloody Battle of Shiloh. Cameron wrote a lengthy account of the battle which was republished in Wisconsin newspapers, and also gave a medical update on some of the notable Wisconsinites wounded or killed in the battle; at the time it was some of the worst fighting seen in the war, and Cameron wrote derisively of the regiments stationed in the eastern theater who had seen comparatively little fighting up to that point in the war. Shortly after the battle, the regiment's chief surgeon, William H. Walker, resigned, and Cameron was promoted to replace him.

After Shiloh, the 14th Wisconsin was assigned to provost duty in western Tennessee for much of the rest of the year. Cameron resigned as surgeon due to medical disability in September 1862. After recuperating, Cameron accepted appointment to serve as surgeon for the board of military enrollment in Wisconsin's 6th congressional district.

In 1866, Cameron was implicated in an alleged corruption scheme involving his brother, Angus Cameron, who was then a member of the Assembly. Allegedly, Dugald Cameron delivered a threat to state senator Charles H. Larkin, compelling him to vote down a railroad bill that would have authorized construction of a new line which would have functionally cut off La Crosse from the Milwaukee–St. Paul route. The implied threat was that if Larkin had voted for the bill, Angus Cameron in the Assembly would work to defeat an appropriation for Larkin's legal fees arising from a previous issue.

== Death ==
According to his obituaries, Cameron was a severe alcoholic. Cameron drank at the saloon owned by Timothy O'Brien—a former comrade from the 14th Wisconsin Infantry—late into the night on August 5, 1867. Leaving the saloon at about 1am on August 6, Cameron was seen intentionally walking into the Mississippi River, where he was swept under in the rapids and apparently drowned. Newspapers described it as a suicide.

== Personal life and family ==
Dugald Cameron was the 8th of 11 known children born to Scottish immigrants Duncan and Sarah (née McColl) Cameron. Dugald's nearest elder brother was Angus Cameron, who followed Dugald to La Crosse in 1857 and later became a United States senator from Wisconsin.

Dugald never married but was very active in local community organizations, he was a leading member of the local Presbyterian community, an officer of the local lodge of the Independent Order of Odd Fellows, and a Freemason. He also organized the Medical Society of La Crosse and the Medical College of La Crosse, with other physicians and surgeons of the area.

== Notes ==
Wisconsin State Assembly
Preceded by Chase A. Stevens	Member of the Wisconsin State Assembly from the Buffalo–Chippewa–La Crosse district January 7, 1856 – January 5, 1857	District abolished
District established	Member of the Wisconsin State Assembly from the La Crosse–Monroe district January 5, 1857 – January 4, 1858	Succeeded by James DeMott Condit
