= Beulah Cemetery =

Cemetery in Vicksburg, Mississippi, US

- U.S. National Register of Historic Places
- Mississippi Landmark
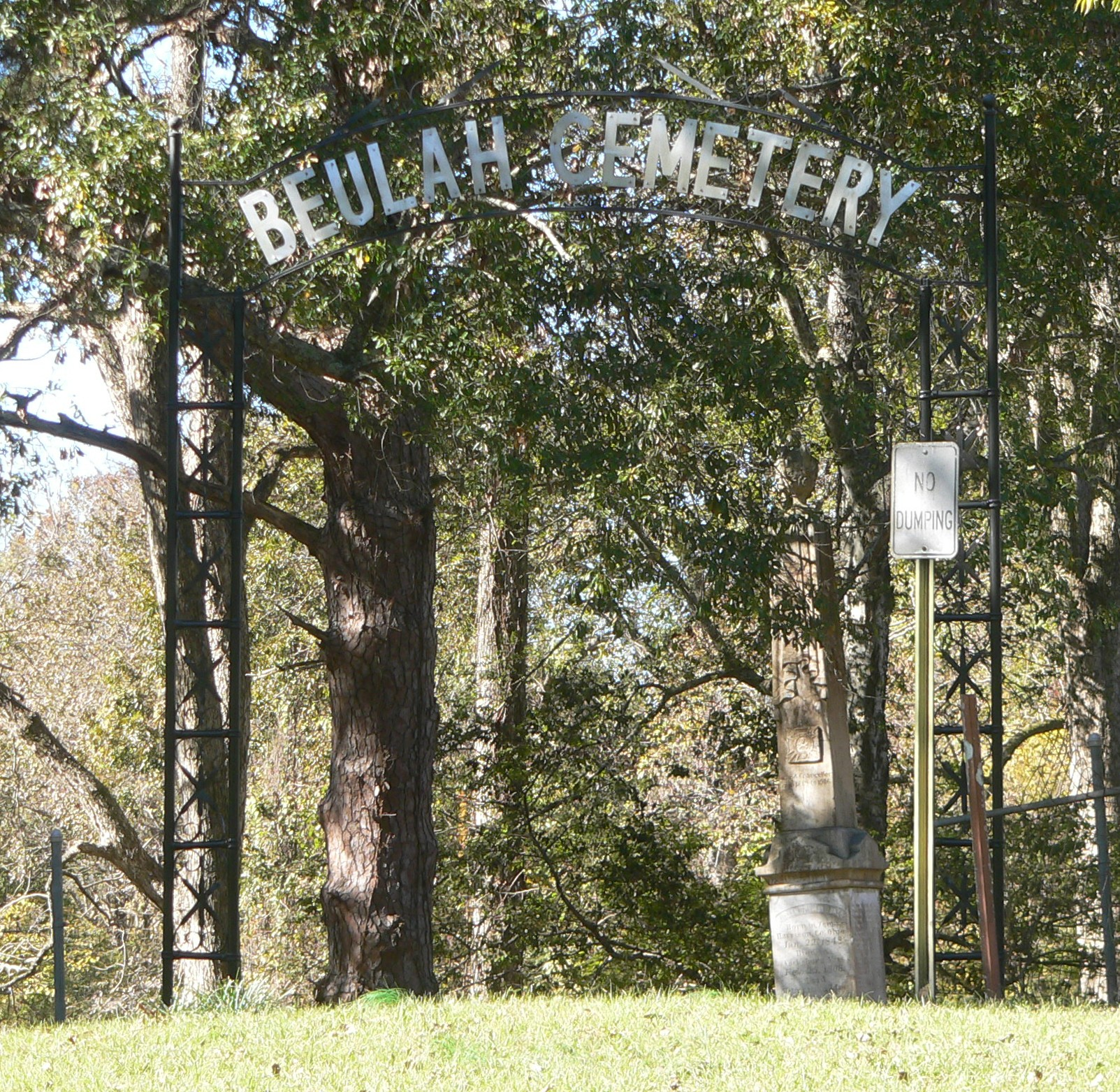
- Location: Junction of Openwood St. and Old Jackson Rd., Vicksburg, Mississippi, U.S.
- Coordinates: 32.35750°N 90.84970°W
- Area: 52 acres (21 ha)
- Built: 1884
- Part of: Vicksburg MRA
- NRHP reference No.: 92001404
- USMS No.: 1590 Page 211

Significant dates
- Added to NRHP: October 23, 1992
- Designated USMS: April 16, 2010

Beulah Cemetery is a historic cemetery in Vicksburg, Mississippi, U.S.. It is a National Register of Historic Places listed place since 1992, and is significant as one of the most intact historic sites associated with the growth of the African-American community of Vicksburg. It is still an active cemetery.

== History ==
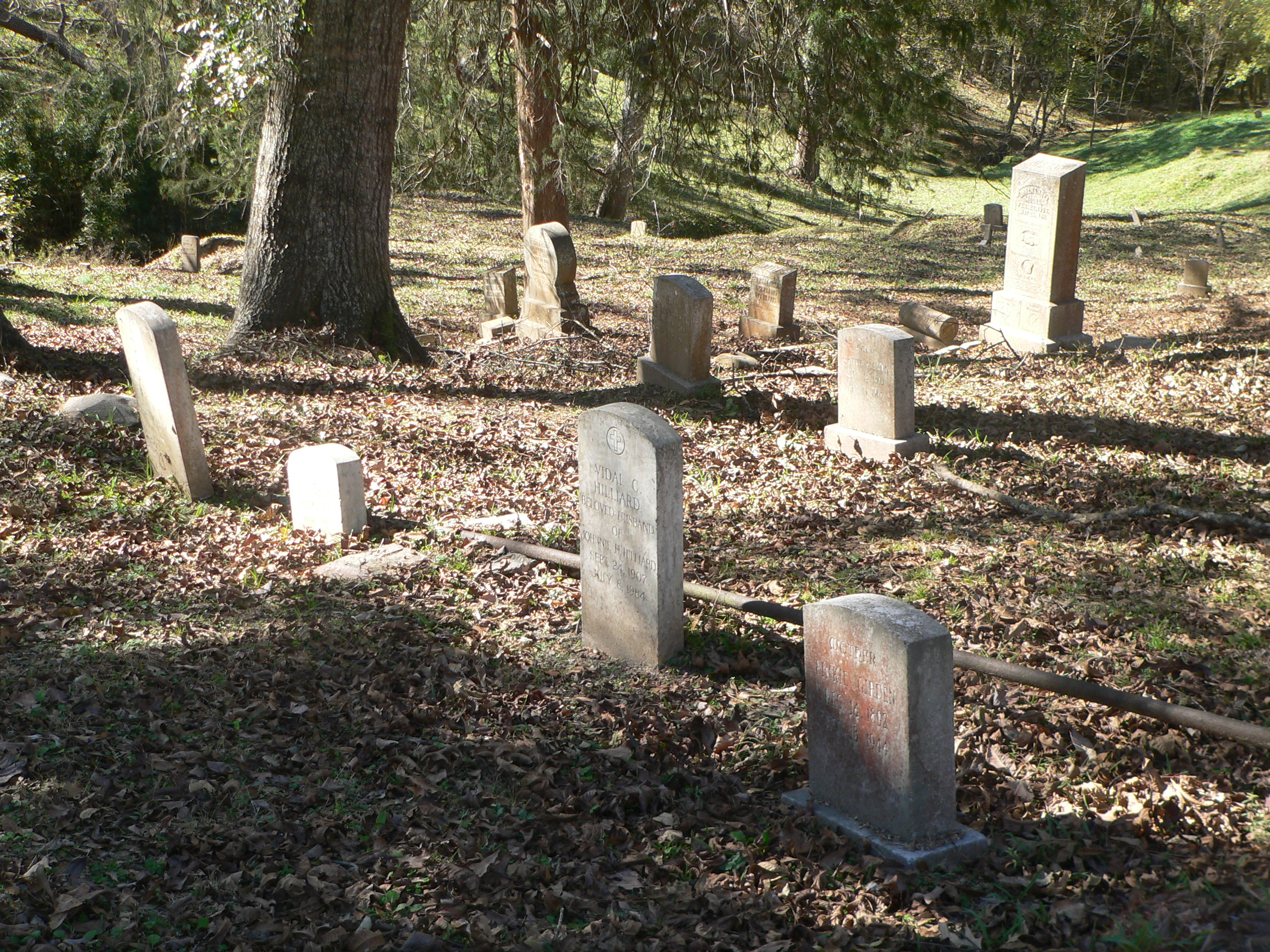
Beulah Cemetery

Beulah was established in 1884 by the Vicksburg Tabernacle No. 19 Independent Order of Brothers and Sisters of Love and Charity, a fraternal order that had wide support among Blacks. It was Vicksburg's only cemetery for African-Americans. The 52 acres (21 ha) of land for the cemetery was purchased by Harvey and Lucy Shannon for US $1000. Prior to the development of Beulah Cemetery, Black people were buried in church cemeteries or in private yards. Beulah Cemetery is abutting the Vicksburg National Military Park.

There are more than 5,500 graves in the 52-acre (21 ha) cemetery. The majority of the graves date from 1884 to the 1940s. The back of the cemetery was known as "paupers field", a place for the burial of unknown, or indigent people.

== Notable burials ==
- Rosa A. Temple, educator and namesake of Rosa A. Temple High School in Vicksburg
- Robert Banks Marshall (1873–?), first Black postal employee in Vicksburg
- G. M. Mclntyre, principal of the Cherry Street School (an early Black high school)
- William H. "Tillmon" Jones (1848–1906), Grand Chancellor of the Knights of Pythias of North America, South America, Europe, Asia, Africa and Australia

== See also ==
- National Register of Historic Places listings in Warren County, Mississippi
- List of cemeteries in Mississippi
