= Gideon Hixon =

19th century American politician

G. C. Hixon
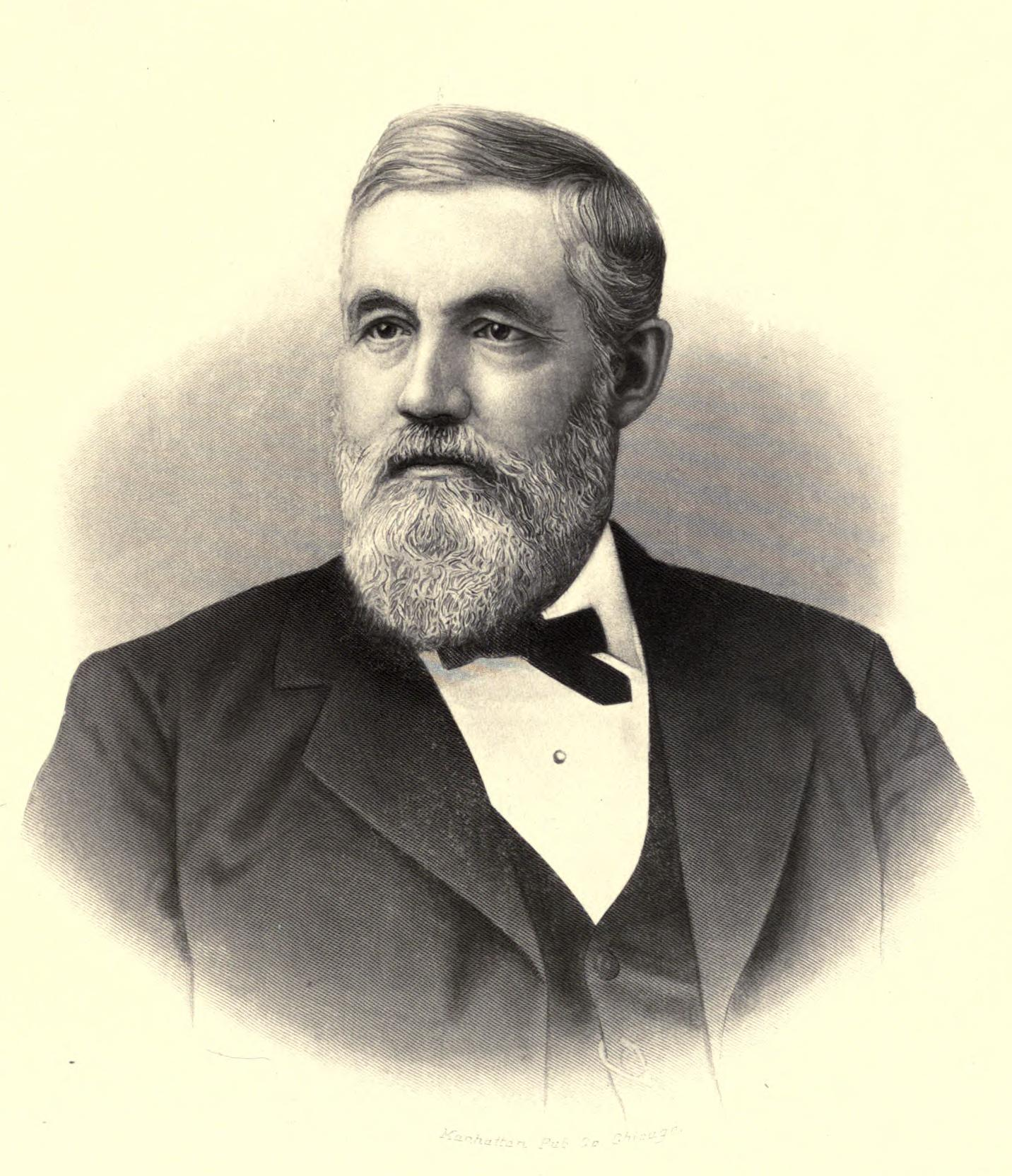
- From A Biographical History, with Portraits, of Prominent Men of the Great West (1894)

Member of the Wisconsin Senate from the 31st district
- In office January 6, 1873 – January 4, 1875
- Preceded by: Angus Cameron
- Succeeded by: Sylvester Nevins

Member of the Wisconsin State Assembly from the La Crosse 1st district
- In office January 2, 1871 – January 6, 1873
- Preceded by: Theodore Rodolf
- Succeeded by: Alexander McMillan

Personal details
- Born: March 28, 1826 Roxbury, Vermont, U.S.
- Died: September 23, 1892 (aged 66) La Crosse, Wisconsin, U.S.
- Resting place: Oak Grove Cemetery, La Crosse
- Party: Republican
- Spouses: Sarah E. Crosby (m. 1850; died 1856); Ellen Jane Pennell (m. 1861–1892)
- Children: Frank Pennell Hixon^{(1862–1931)}; Joseph Morris Hixon^{(1864–1936)}; William Lloyd Hixon^{(1867–1916)}; George Cooley Hixon^{(1871–1923)}; Robert Hixon^{(1878–1945)}
- Occupation: Tinsmith, lumberman, miller, banker

Gideon Cooley Hixon (March 28, 1826 – September 23, 1892) was an American businessman and Republican politician. He was a pioneer settler of La Crosse, Wisconsin, and represented La Crosse County in the Wisconsin State Senate and State Assembly. In historical documents, his last name is sometimes spelled "Hickson".

== Biography ==
Born in Roxbury, Vermont, he moved with his family to Massachusetts, where he was raised and educated. His father died in 1836, and he went to live with his grandfather after completing his education and worked on his farm. He disliked farm work, though, and at age 16 he went to work in a factory, then apprenticed as a tinsmith. He then worked as a tinning contractor for several years in a hardware business in Chicopee, Massachusetts, and that business brought him west to St. Louis in 1856. Learning of the many business opportunities in the west, and having a significant amount of capital from his tinning work, he decided to form a partnership with William Wheeler Crosby—the half-brother of his wife—to establish a lumber mill venture in the vicinity of La Crosse, Wisconsin. Crosby had moved to La Crosse in 1854, and the Hixons followed in 1858. Gideon would remain in La Crosse for the rest of his life.

His first wife died in 1856, and his original lumber mill was destroyed by fire in 1862. However, he bounced back in another lumber mill partnership in 1863, known as Hixon & Withee and later G. C. Hixon & Company. They dealt timber lands and mills around La Crosse and ran the products down the Mississippi River to Missouri, where they also operated a lumber yard. Hixon also became involved in local politics during the 1860s; he was elected to the La Crosse Common Council in 1863, and was then elected city assessor in 1865.

He was elected to the Wisconsin State Assembly in 1870, running on the Republican Party ticket. He was elected in La Crosse County's first Assembly district, which then comprised the southern half of the county. After the redistricting of 1871, La Crosse was combined into a single Assembly district. Hixon was then elected to represent that new Assembly district in the 1872 session.

In 1872, he was the Republican candidate for Wisconsin State Senate in the 31st State Senate district, which was then identical to his Assembly district. He defeated Liberal Republican Gilbert M. Woodward and served a two year term. He was not a candidate for re-election in 1874.

After serving four years in the Legislature, Hixon was elected to several terms on the La Crosse school board, and was president of the board in 1877 and 1878. In addition to his elected offices, Hixon was involved in many business ventures in and around the city of La Crosse. After prospering in his initial lumber ventures, he ultimately owned several productive mills, producing flour, wool, paper, and other goods. With his profits, he became an investor in other ventures. He was one of the founders of the La Crosse National Bank in 1877, and was then president of that bank. He was also an investor and a driver behind the La Crosse Street Railway company. He was also a founder of the short-lived La Crosse Petroleum Company which sought to exploit the oil reserves which were believed to exist in west central Wisconsin.

Hixon suffered from heart disease for many years, and largely retired from business and politics in the early 1880s, turning over his affairs to his sons. He ultimately died of heart failure on the morning of September 23, 1892, at his home in La Crosse.

== Personal life and family ==
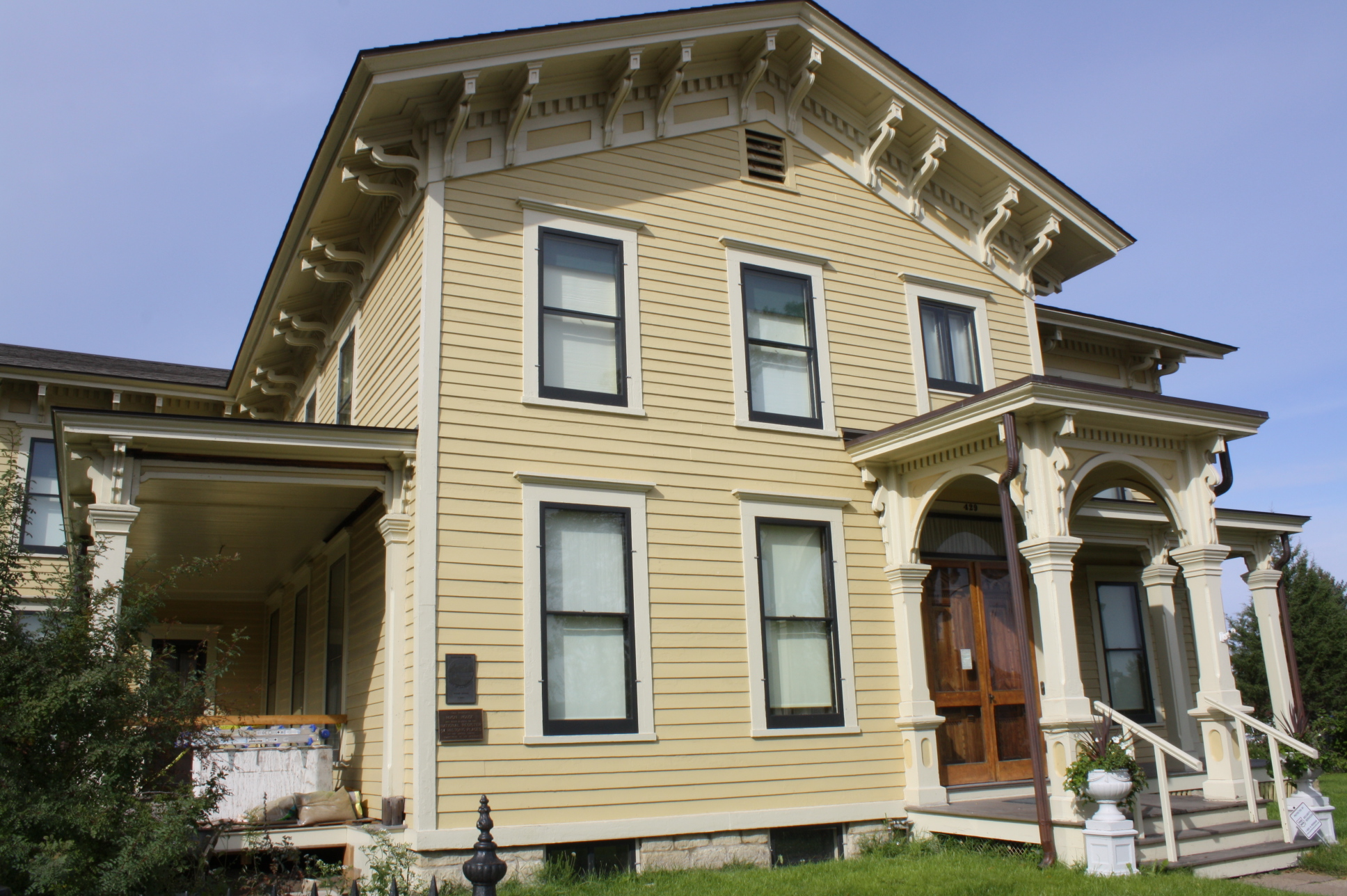
Gideon C. Hixon House, front

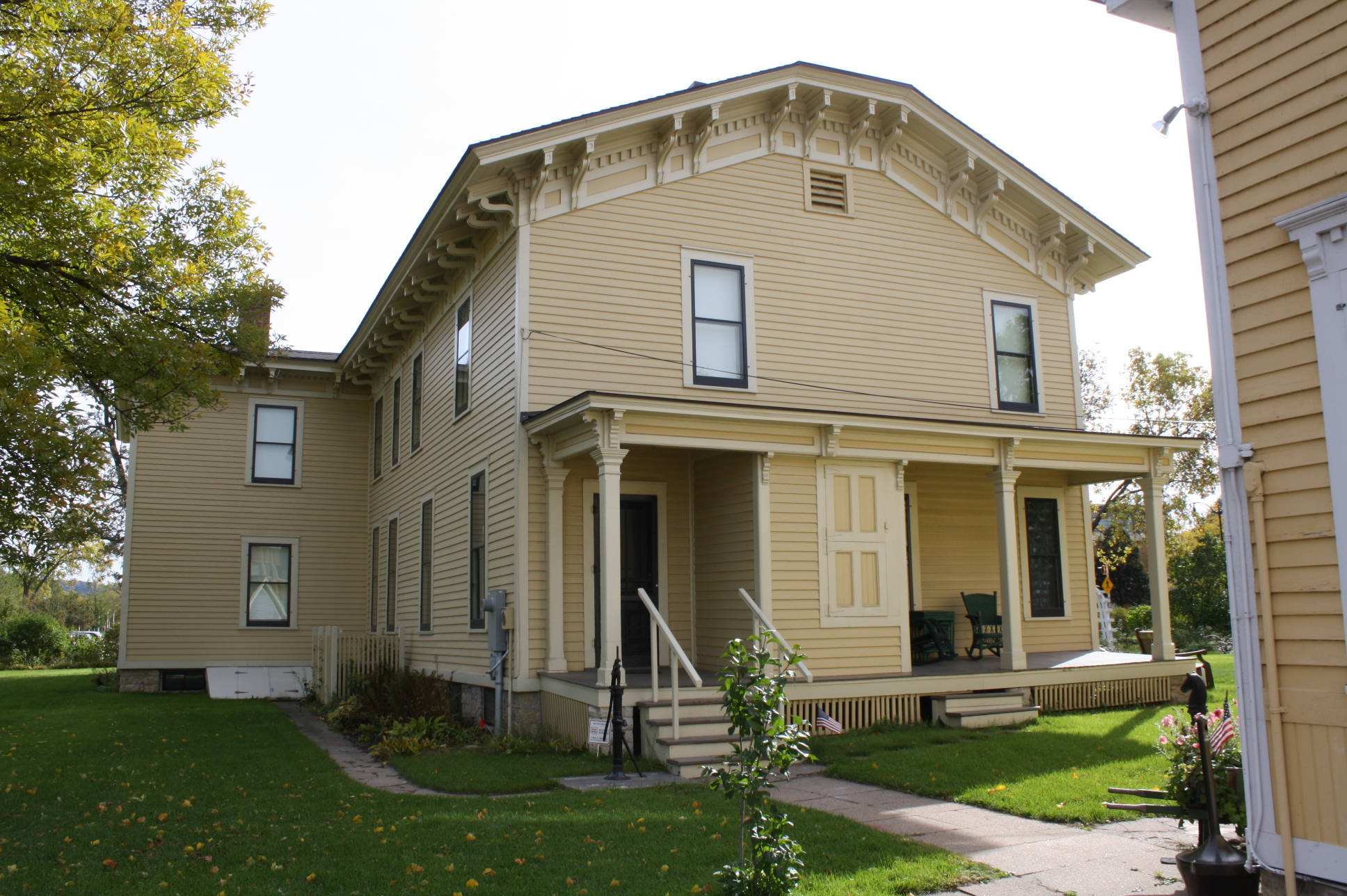
Gideon Hixon House, rear

Gideon Hixon was a son of Joseph Hixon and his wife Electa (née Cooley). His maternal grandfather was Green Cooley, one of the founders of Springfield, Massachusetts.

Gideon Hixon married twice. He first married Sarah E. Crosby, of Maine, in 1850. She died in 1856. He subsequently married school teacher Ellen Jane Pennell in 1861. They had five sons together who all survived him. He left an extensive estate to his wife and sons, which became the basis for generations of successful business ventures, and a charitable foundation which still exists today.

His house is listed on the National Register of Historic Places.

== Electoral history ==
=== Wisconsin Assembly (1870, 1871) ===
Wisconsin Assembly, La Crosse 1st District Election, 1870
Party	Candidate	Votes	%	±%
General Election, November 8, 1870
Republican	Gideon C. Hixon	1,005	66.73%	+21.92%
Democratic	John J. Cole	501	33.27%	
Plurality		504	33.47%	+23.09%
Total votes		1,506	100.0%	-13.15%
Republican gain from Democratic				

Wisconsin Assembly, La Crosse District Election, 1871
Party	Candidate	Votes	%	±%
General Election, November 7, 1871
Republican	Gideon C. Hixon	1,840	57.83%	
Democratic	N. D. Loomis	1,342	42.17%	
Plurality		498	15.65%	
Total votes		3,182	100.0%	
Republican win (new seat)				

=== Wisconsin Senate (1872) ===
Wisconsin Senate, 31st District Election, 1872
Party	Candidate	Votes	%	±%
General Election, November 5, 1872
Republican	Gideon C. Hixon	2,213	53.13%	−19.26%
Liberal Republican	Gilbert M. Woodward	1,952	46.87%	
Plurality		261	6.27%	-38.53%
Total votes		4,165	100.0%	+8.15%
Republican hold				

Wisconsin State Assembly
Preceded by Theodore Rodolf	Member of the Wisconsin State Assembly from the La Crosse 1st district January 2, 1871 – January 1, 1872	District abolished
District created	Member of the Wisconsin State Assembly from the La Crosse district January 1, 1872 – January 6, 1873	Succeeded by Alexander McMillan
Wisconsin Senate
Preceded by Angus Cameron	Member of the Wisconsin Senate from the 31st district January 6, 1873 – January 4, 1875	Succeeded by Sylvester Nevins
