= Angus Cameron (American politician) =

19th century American politician

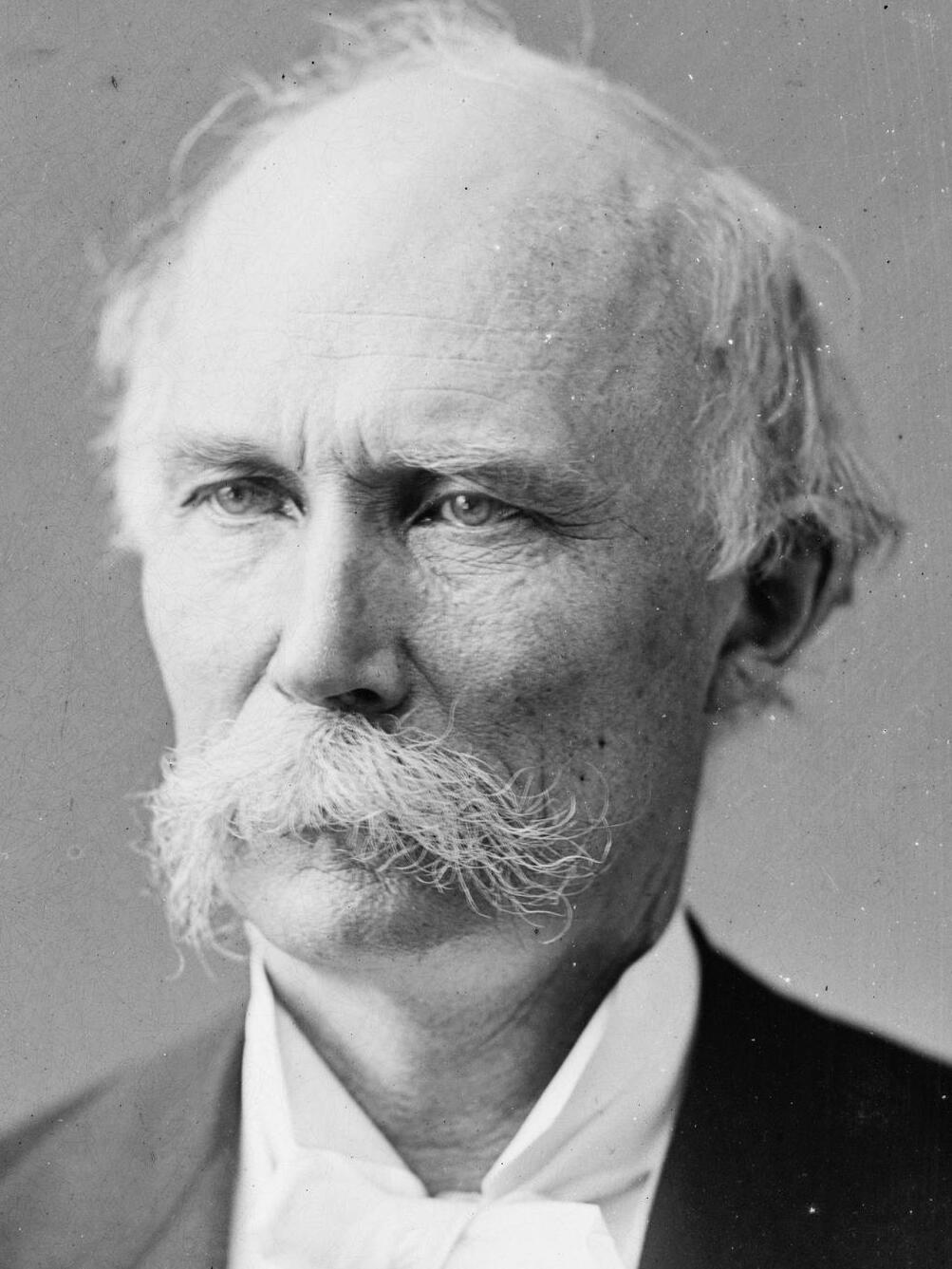

Chairman of the Senate Committee on Claims
- In office March 14, 1881 – March 3, 1885
- Preceded by: Francis Cockrell
- Succeeded by: Austin F. Pike

United States Senator from Wisconsin
- In office March 14, 1881 – March 3, 1885
- Preceded by: Matthew H. Carpenter
- Succeeded by: John Coit Spooner
- In office March 4, 1875 – March 3, 1881
- Preceded by: Matthew H. Carpenter
- Succeeded by: Philetus Sawyer

18th Speaker of the Wisconsin State Assembly
- In office January 9, 1867 – January 8, 1868
- Preceded by: Henry D. Barron
- Succeeded by: Alexander McDonald Thomson

Member of the Wisconsin Senate from the 31st district
- In office January 1, 1871 – January 1, 1873
- Preceded by: Cyrus M. Butt
- Succeeded by: Gideon C. Hixon
- In office January 1, 1863 – January 1, 1865
- Preceded by: Edwin Flint
- Succeeded by: John Alonzo Chandler

Member of the Wisconsin State Assembly from the La Crosse 1st district
- In office January 1, 1866 – January 1, 1868
- Preceded by: Townsend N. Horton
- Succeeded by: Theodore Rodolf

Personal details
- Born: July 4, 1824 Caledonia, New York, U.S.
- Died: March 30, 1897 (aged 70) La Crosse, Wisconsin, U.S.
- Party: Republican
- Spouse: Mary Papillon Baker (m. 1856–1897)
- Relatives: Dugald D. Cameron (brother)
- Education: Genesee Wesleyan Seminary; State and National Law School
- Profession: lawyer, banker, politician
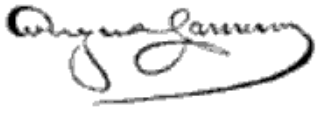
- Signature

Angus Cameron (July 4, 1824 – March 30, 1897) was an American lawyer, banker, Republican politician, and Wisconsin pioneer. He served ten years as a United States senator, representing Wisconsin from 1875 to 1885. He was appointed chairman of the select committee to investigate allegations of fraud in the hotly contested 1876 United States presidential election in South Carolina; his report found widespread terrorism and intimidation against African American voters. He was later chairman of the Committee on Claims during his last four years in the Senate.

He was first elected to the Senate in the bitter 1875 election, when a faction of Republican legislators withheld their votes from incumbent U.S. senator Matthew H. Carpenter, resulting in a week-long stalemate; Cameron was ultimately elected by a coalition of the Republican holdouts and Democratic legislators. He was then not renominated in the regular 1881 election, but two months later he was quickly embraced by the Republican caucus in the 1881 special election to again succeed Matthew Carpenter.

Before his election to the U.S. Senate, he served as the 18th speaker of the Wisconsin State Assembly and served four years in the Wisconsin Senate representing La Crosse County. His brothers Hugh Cameron and Dugald D. Cameron were also notable pioneers of the La Crosse region.

== Early life and career in New York ==
Angus Cameron was born in the town of Caledonia, New York, on July 4, 1824. (Note: Many sources give his birth year as 1826, but this is likely incorrect, possibly done intentionally at some time so that he could claim to have been born on the 50th anniversary of the Declaration of Independence, rather than the 48th anniversary.) As a child, he worked on his father's farm in Livingston County, New York, and attended Temple Hill Academy in nearby Geneseo, New York. At age 13, he attended the Genesee Wesleyan Seminary in Lima, New York, which is now Syracuse University. After completing his education there, he began teaching school to earn money.

In 1850, Cameron began studying law in the office of Wadsworth & Cameron in Buffalo, New York; the firm was owned by Cameron's eldest brother, Hugh Cameron, and partner James Wadsworth. He completed his legal education at State and National Law School in 1853, and was admitted to the New York Bar. He began his legal career again working out of his brother's law office in Buffalo, mostly practicing in commercial and real estate transactions. During these years, he first became active in politics as a member of the Whig Party, and in 1854 he was chairman of the Whig central committee for the city of Buffalo.

After his brother and law partner, Hugh, moved to Wisconsin in 1856, Cameron briefly took a break from his legal practice and started a bank and brokerage with Frederick H. Wing, using the firm name Cameron & Wing. The firm's primary business was in speculating on purchases of "uncurrent money"—banknotes or obsolete paper money which were not readily accepted in circulation at their face value.

== Political career ==
In 1857, Cameron moved to La Crosse, Wisconsin, where he continued his legal and banking careers. Initially a Whig, he joined the Republican Party when it was founded in the mid-1850s. He was twice elected to the Wisconsin Senate, serving first in the 1863 and 1864 terms, then again in 1871 and 1872. He was a delegate to the 1864 National Union National Convention. He was elected to two terms in the Wisconsin State Assembly, serving in the 1866 and 1867 terms; he was elected speaker of the Assembly for the 1867 term.

Cameron also served on the University of Wisconsin Board of Regents from 1866 to 1875, and helped found Christ Church of La Crosse.

In February 1875 the Wisconsin Legislature, in joint session, elected Cameron to the United States Senate, and he served from March 4, 1875, to March 3, 1881. He did not seek reelection in 1881. During this term he was appointed chairman of a committee to investigate alleged election fraud in South Carolina during the disputed United States presidential election of 1876.

In February 1881 Senator Matthew H. Carpenter died in office, and on March 10 Cameron was elected to complete the remaining four years of his six-year term. Cameron took his seat on March 14, and served until March 3, 1885. He was not a candidate for reelection in 1885.

After leaving the U.S. Senate, Cameron returned to his banking and legal interests. Cameron died in La Crosse on March 30, 1897.

== Personal life and legacy ==
Angus Cameron was the seventh of 11 known children born to Scottish immigrants Duncan and Sarah (née McColl) Cameron.

Angus Cameron began his legal career in partnership with his eldest brother, Hugh Cameron, who later became one of the most prominent lawyers in Wisconsin. Another elder brother, Daniel Cameron, became a physician and served as county judge in Ontonagon County, Michigan, before his sudden death in 1856.

Angus Cameron's younger brother, Dugald D. Cameron, also came to La Crosse, Wisconsin, represented La Crosse for two terms in the Wisconsin State Assembly in the 1850s, and served as a Union Army surgeon in the American Civil War.

Angus Cameron married Mary Papillon Baker on February 21, 1856, at Urbana, New York; her grandfather Samuel Baker was a Revolutionary War soldier and a first cousin of U.S. president Martin Van Buren. They had no known children.

The village of Cameron, in Barron County, Wisconsin, was named for him.

== Notes ==
Wisconsin State Assembly
Preceded by Henry D. Barron	Speaker of the Wisconsin State Assembly; 1867 – 1868	Succeeded by Alexander McDonald Thomson
Wisconsin Senate
Preceded by Edwin Flint	Member of the Wisconsin Senate from the 31st district 1863 – 1865	Succeeded by John Alonzo Chandler
Preceded by Cyrus M. Butt	Member of the Wisconsin Senate from the 31st district 1871 – 1873	Succeeded by Gideon C. Hixon
U.S. Senate
Preceded by Matthew H. Carpenter	U.S. senator (Class 1) from Wisconsin; 1875 – 1881; Served alongside: Timothy O. Howe, Matthew H. Carpenter	Succeeded by Philetus Sawyer
Preceded by Matthew H. Carpenter	U.S. senator (Class 3) from Wisconsin; 1881 – 1885; Served alongside: Philetus Sawyer	Succeeded by John C. Spooner
Preceded by Francis Cockrell	Chairman of the U.S. Senate Committee on Claims; March 14, 1881 – March 3, 1885	Succeeded by Austin F. Pike
