= Alexander McMillan (Wisconsin pioneer) =

19th century American politician

Alex McMillan
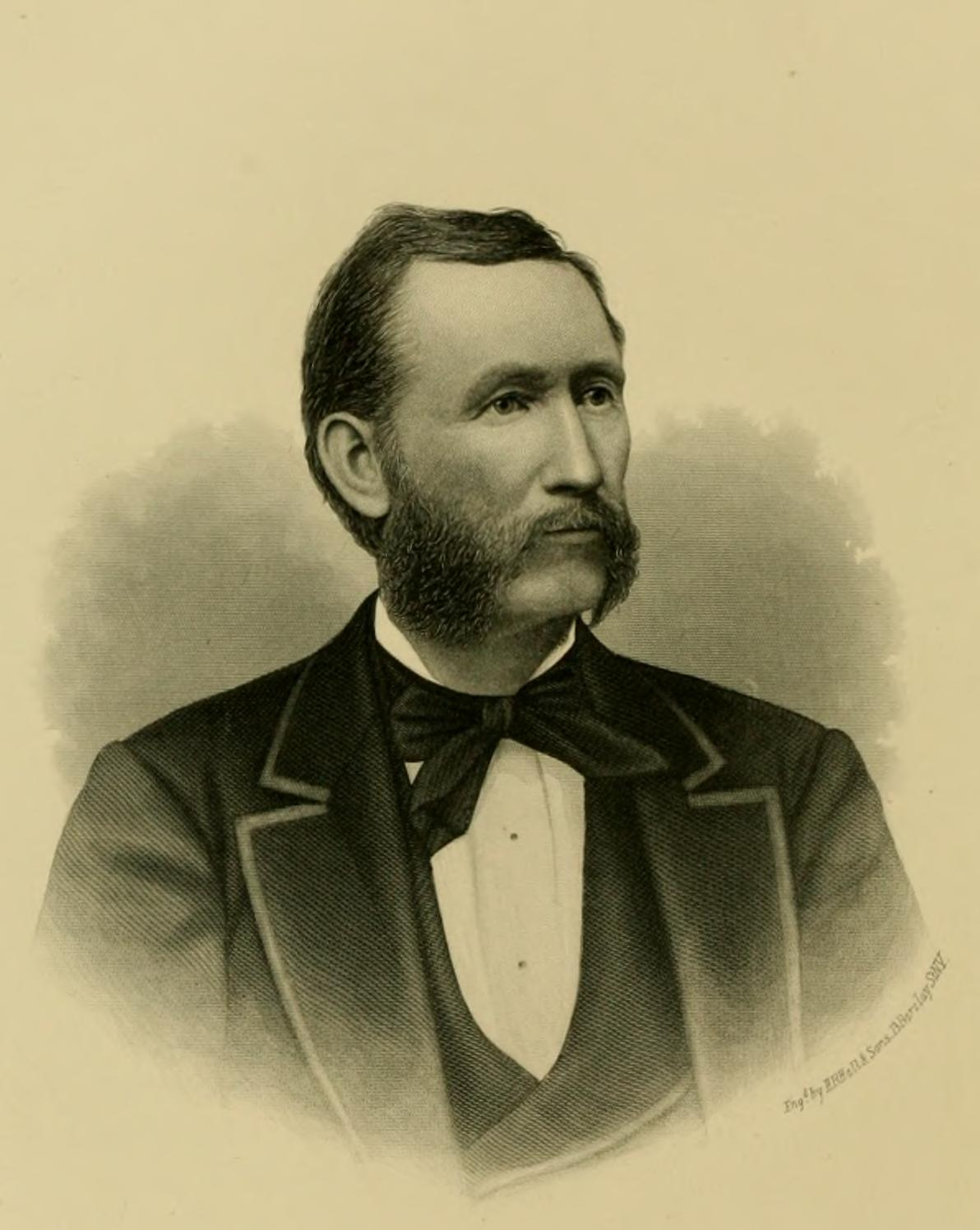
- Engraving by H. B. Hall & Sons

13th Mayor of La Crosse, Wisconsin
- In office April 1871 – April 1872
- Preceded by: Theodore Rodolf
- Succeeded by: James I. Lyndes

Member of the Wisconsin State Assembly from the La Crosse district
- In office January 6, 1873 – January 5, 1874
- Preceded by: Gideon Hixon
- Succeeded by: Donald A. McDonald

Personal details
- Born: October 23, 1825 Stormont County, Upper Canada
- Died: October 25, 1901 (aged 76) La Crosse, Wisconsin, U.S.
- Resting place: Oak Grove Cemetery, La Crosse, Wisconsin
- Party: Republican
- Spouse: Sarah Louise Parker (m. 1858; died 1892)
- Children: Mary (May) McMillan; Angie (Nannie) McMillan; Samuel D. McMillan; Jessie McMillan

Alexander McMillan (October 23, 1825 – October 25, 1901) was a Canadian American immigrant, businessman, and Wisconsin pioneer. He was the 13th mayor of La Crosse, Wisconsin, and represented La Crosse County in the Wisconsin State Assembly.

== Biography ==
Alexander McMillan was born on October 23, 1825, in Stormont County, in what is now the province of Ontario, Canada. His parents had emigrated to Canada from Scotland just a few years earlier. McMillan was educated in the common schools there and worked on his father's farm.

When he was old enough, he moved to New York and labored there until 1850, when he took a steamboat to the west and settled in Madison, the capital of the new state of Wisconsin. He was employed as a clerk for three months and taught night school, then moved north to Portage, Wisconsin.

In 1852, he formed a partnership with his elder brother John to establish a lumbering business in the western part of the state. They set up their headquarters in La Crosse, Wisconsin, and became the first logging company operating on the Black River, known first as the Black River Logging Company. The business grew rapidly and in 1864 they invited their younger brother, Duncan, to also partner in the firm, which became known as J., A., & D. D. McMillan. That same year, the Black River Improvement Company was organized with a McMillan serving as president of the company.

McMillan's business success also led to political influence, and he became active with the Republican Party of Wisconsin. He was a county commissioner in 1866 and served on the La Crosse city council and the county board of supervisors (the successor organization to the county commission) during the 1870s. In 1871, he was elected mayor of La Crosse, defeating incumbent Democrat Theodore Rodolf. He suffered a brief illness while serving as mayor and spent six months over the Winter in California. He did not run for re-election in 1872, but ran for Wisconsin State Assembly in the Fall election that year, and was chosen to represent his county in the 26th Wisconsin Legislature. He was also president of the La Crosse Temperance League.

In the midst of the Panic of 1873, he was selected as president of the First National Bank of La Crosse. He went on to help found the La Crosse Gas Light Company and was the president of the company until it was sold to the Electric Light Company in 1885. He also ran a number of water-powered mills in the vicinity of La Crosse, and owned a large livestock breeding farm, which produced prized Hambletonian horses and Alderney cattle. When his son came of age, he became his chief business partner in a firm known as "McMillan & Son", which also owned a significant amount of commercial and residential real estate in La Crosse. His son took over full control of the family's assets in 1892, as McMillan's health deteriorated.

McMillan was an invalid for the last nine years of his life, and died at his home in La Crosse on October 25, 1901.

== Personal life and family ==
McMillan was one of twelve children born to Scottish American immigrants Duncan B. and Mary McMillan. Several of his siblings also moved to Wisconsin and were involved in business and politics with him. McMillan was able to speak Scottish Gaelic, due to exposure to the language in his childhood.

Alexander McMillan married Sarah L. Parker at La Crosse in October 1858. They had four children, though only one survived infancy—their son Samuel D. McMillan. Sarah McMillan was said to be a talented painter.

Wisconsin State Assembly
| Preceded by Gideon Hixon | Member of the Wisconsin State Assembly from the La Crosse district January 6, 1873 – January 5, 1874 | Succeeded by Donald A. McDonald |
Political offices
| Preceded by Theodore Rodolf | Mayor of La Crosse, Wisconsin; April 1871 – April 1872 | Succeeded by James I. Lyndes |
