= Charles Rodolf =

American politician

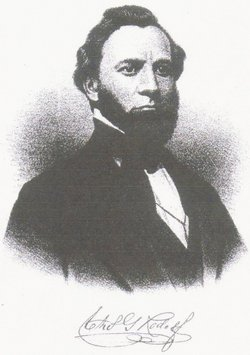

Personal details
- Born: November 15, 1818 Switzerland
- Died: July 5, 1898 (aged 79) Wichita, Kansas, U.S.
- Resting place: Maple Grove Cemetery, Wichita, Kansas
- Party: Democratic
- Spouse: Cordelia Emerance Read (died 1907)
- Children: Cordelia Emerance (Pratt)^{(b. 1845; died 1888)}; Francis Gottlieb Rodolf^{(b. 1847; died 1924)}; Roland Otto Rodolf^{(b. 1863; died 1913)}; Cora Adele (Hodges)^{(b. 1868; died 1934)}
- Parents: Johanne Friedrick Rodolf^{(b. 1788; died 1834)}; Emerence Emerensinia Koller^{(b. 1784; died 1856)}
- Relatives: Theodore Rodolf (brother)

Charles Rodolf (November 15, 1818 – July 5, 1898) was a member of the Wisconsin State Assembly and the Wisconsin State Senate.

== Biography ==
Rodolf was born in Zurzach, Switzerland, in 1818. He moved to New Orleans, Louisiana in 1833 and to Wiota, Wisconsin in 1834.

His brother, Theodore Rodolf, was also a member of the Assembly.

== Career ==
After twice being a member of the Assembly, Rodolf was a member of the Senate from 1859 to 1860. In 1864, he was a candidate for the United States House of Representatives from Wisconsin's 3rd congressional district, losing to incumbent Amasa Cobb. He was a Democrat.
