= Timothy O. Howe =

19th century American politician

The Honorable Timothy O. Howe
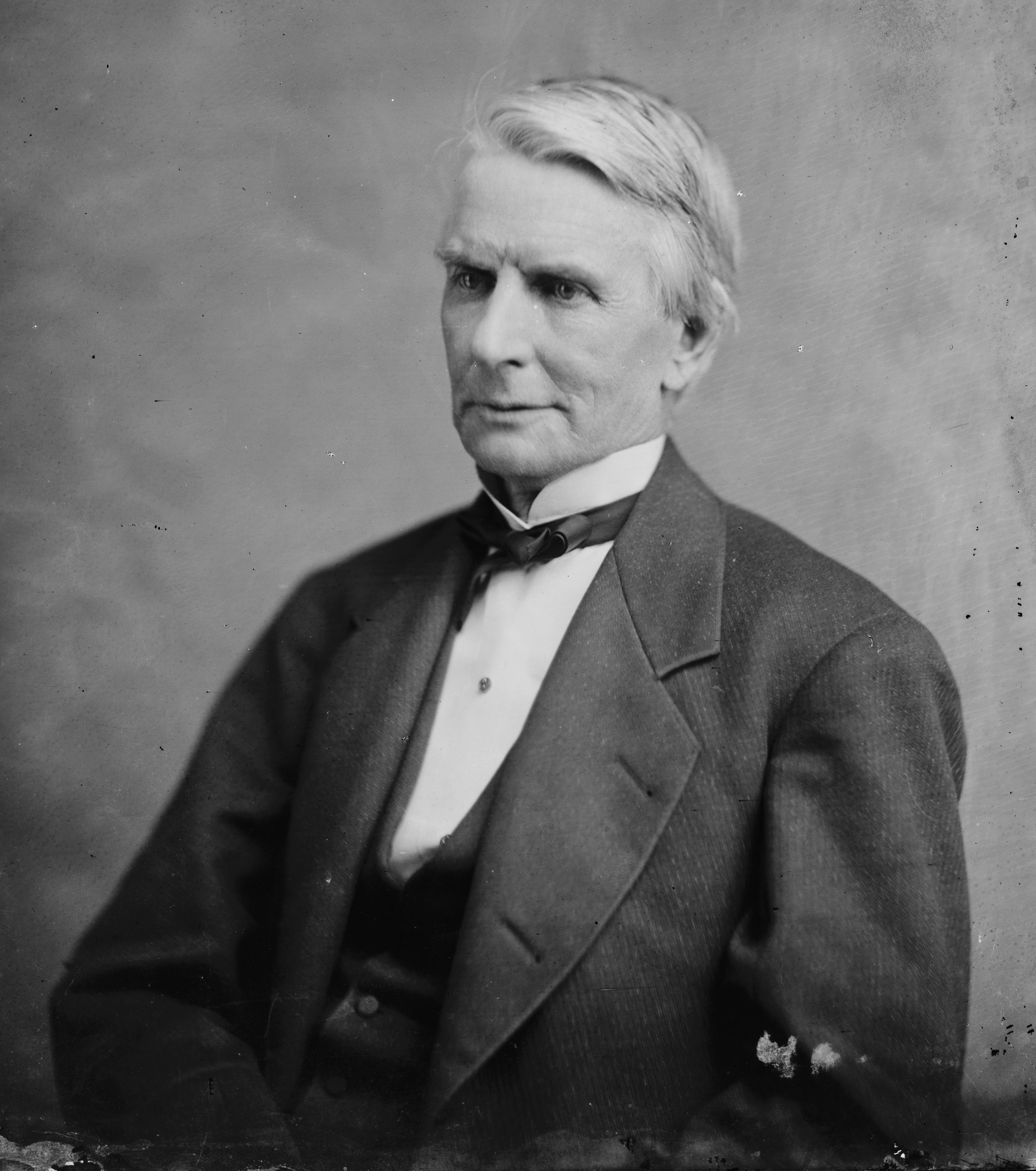

30th United States Postmaster General
- In office December 20, 1881 – March 25, 1883
- President: Chester A. Arthur
- Preceded by: Thomas Lemuel James
- Succeeded by: Walter Q. Gresham

United States Senator from Wisconsin
- In office March 4, 1861 – March 3, 1879
- Preceded by: Charles Durkee
- Succeeded by: Matthew H. Carpenter

Justice of the Wisconsin Supreme Court
- ex officio
- In office January 1, 1851 – June 1, 1853

Wisconsin Circuit Court Judge for the 4th Circuit
- In office January 1, 1851 – 1855
- Preceded by: Alexander W. Stow
- Succeeded by: William R. Gorsline

Personal details
- Born: Timothy Otis Howe; February 24, 1816 Livermore, District of Maine, Massachusetts, U.S.
- Died: March 25, 1883 (aged 67) Kenosha, Wisconsin, U.S.
- Resting place: Woodlawn Cemetery; Green Bay, Wisconsin
- Party: Republican; Whig (before 1854)
- Spouses: Linda Ann Haines; (died 1881)
- Children: Mary (Totten)^{(b. 1844; died 1913)}; Frank Howard Howe^{(b. 1850; died 1897)}
- Relatives: James Henry Howe (nephew)
- Education: Maine Wesleyan Seminary

Timothy Otis Howe (February 24, 1816 – March 25, 1883) was an American lawyer, jurist, Republican politician, and Wisconsin pioneer. He was a United States senator for three terms, representing the state of Wisconsin from March 4, 1861, to March 3, 1879, and was considered a member of the Radical Republican faction due to his support for racial equality. He later served as the 30th U.S. postmaster general under President Chester A. Arthur, from 1881 until his death in 1883. While he was serving as U.S. senator, President Ulysses S. Grant offered to appoint Howe as Chief Justice of the United States, following the death of Salmon P. Chase, but Howe declined because he believed that it would result in his U.S. Senate seat being claimed by a Democrat.

Earlier in his career, he was a justice of the Wisconsin Supreme Court, at the time that the Wisconsin Supreme Court was simply a panel of the state's circuit court judges.

His nephew, James Henry Howe, became a United States district judge in Wisconsin.

== Biography ==
Howe was born in Livermore, Maine (then, part of the commonwealth of Massachusetts), to Timothy Howe and Betsey Howard, attended Readfield Seminary now Kents Hill School, in Readfield, Maine, and studied law with local judges. In 1839, Howe was admitted to the Maine Bar and began practicing law in Readfield. In 1845, he was elected to the Maine House of Representatives. Shortly thereafter, Howe moved to Green Bay, Wisconsin, and opened a law office. He was an ardent Whig and ran an unsuccessful campaign for U.S. Congress in 1848.

Howe married Linda Ann Haines and together the couple had 2 children, Mary E. Howe and Frank K. Howe.

Howe was elected circuit judge in Wisconsin and served in that position from 1851 to 1855. As a circuit judge, he also served as a justice of the Wisconsin Supreme Court until a separate Supreme Court was organized in 1853.

In 1857, Howe ran unsuccessfully for the U.S. Senate. In 1861, Howe ran again and won election to the Senate, serving during the American Civil War and Reconstruction. During his time in the Senate, he was an abolitionist and supporter of the Fifteenth Amendment. Howe argued against the claims of contemporary Democrats that blacks were inherently racially inferior, and remarked that their claim that abolition would cause a war of racial extermination was "a libel upon humanity, black or white." During this time he was considered one of the "Radical Republicans" due to his support for racial equality and his opposition to discrimination.

1865 Congressional Hearings chaired by Senator Doolittle looked into Sioux Complaints from the Yankton and Dakota tribes. The Senator found: "Many agents, teachers, and employees of the government, are inefficient, faithless, and even guilty of peculations are fraudulent practices upon the government and upon the Indians." Yankton Chief Medicine Cow testified that Government Agents were the cause of the Minnesota problems. What those agents did in Minnesota was a harbinger of the history coming for the other tribes of the plains.

While in the Senate, President Ulysses S. Grant offered Howe the position of Chief Justice of the U.S. Supreme Court. However, Howe declined the offer because he feared his successor to the Senate would be a Democrat. Howe lost his senate seat in 1879 to fellow Republican Matthew H. Carpenter. In 1881, he was appointed United States Postmaster General by President Chester A. Arthur, a position he held until his death in Kenosha, Wisconsin, on March 25, 1883.

== Electoral history ==
=== U.S. House of Representatives (1848) ===
Wisconsin's 3rd Congressional District Election, 1848
Party	Candidate	Votes	%	±%
General Election, November 7, 1848
Democratic	James Duane Doty	5,746	50.34%	
Whig	Timothy O. Howe	3,338	29.24%	
Free Soil	Stoddard Judd	2,330	20.41%	
Plurality		2,408	21.10%	
Total votes		11,414	100.0%	
Democratic win (new seat)				

=== Wisconsin Lieutenant Governor (1849) ===
Wisconsin Lieutenant Gubernatorial Election, 1849
Party	Candidate	Votes	%	±%
General Election, November 6, 1849
Democratic	Samuel Beall	16,446	52.33%	−5.37pp
Whig	Timothy O. Howe	10,983	34.95%	−7.35pp
Free Soil	John Bannister	3,976	12.65%	
	Scattering	21	0.07%	
Plurality		5,463	17.38%	+1.98pp
Total votes		31,426	100.0%	-7.40%
Democratic hold				

=== U.S. Senate (1861) ===
United States Senate Election in Wisconsin, 1861
Party	Candidate	Votes	%	±%
Vote of the 14th Wisconsin Legislature, January 23, 1861
Republican	Timothy O. Howe	92	72.44%	
Democratic	Henry L. Palmer	34	26.77%	
	Absent or not voting	1	0.79%	
Plurality		58	45.67%	
Total votes		127	100.0%	
Republican hold				

== Sources consulted ==
- Wisconsin Supreme Court biographical sketch
- United States Congress. "Timothy O. Howe (id: H000856)". Biographical Directory of the United States Congress.

== Footnotes ==
Legal offices
Preceded by Alexander W. Stow	Wisconsin Circuit Court Judge for the 4th Circuit; 1851 – 1855	Succeeded by William R. Gorsline
U.S. Senate
Preceded by Charles Durkee	U.S. Senator (Class 3) from Wisconsin; 1861 – 1879; Served alongside: James R. Doolittle (1861–1869); Matthew H. Carpenter (1869–1875); Angus Cameron (1875–1879)	Succeeded by Matthew H. Carpenter
Political offices
Preceded by Thomas L. James	United States Postmaster General; Served under: Chester A. Arthur; 1881 – 1883	Succeeded by Walter Q. Gresham
