= Harvey Shannon =

Harvey Alex Shannon (c. 1831—May 14, 1906) was an American medical doctor, state legislator, and newspaper publisher in Vicksburg, Mississippi.

== Biography ==
Harvey Shannon was born in about 1831 near Nashville, Davidson County, Tennessee. Shannon served as a senior first lieutenant in the Confederate States Army during the American Civil War (and commanding during Swett's Mississippi Battery).

He was co-publisher of The Vicksburg Times, established in 1866. He was married on June 4, 1868 to Lucy Vick Irwin of Carroll County, Mississippi.

The 52 acres (21 ha) of land for the Beulah Cemetery in Vicksburg, the first Black cemetery in the city, was purchased in 1884 by Shannon and his wife. The cemetery was associated with the fraternal organization Vicksburg Tabernacle No. 19 Independent Order of Brothers and Sisters of Love and Charity.

His brother Fountain E. Pitts Shannon (or F.E.P. Shannon) died of Yellow fever in 1883. Harvey Shannon died on May 14, 1906 in Nashville.
