= Gideon C. Hixon House =

Historic house in Wisconsin, United States

- U.S. National Register of Historic Places
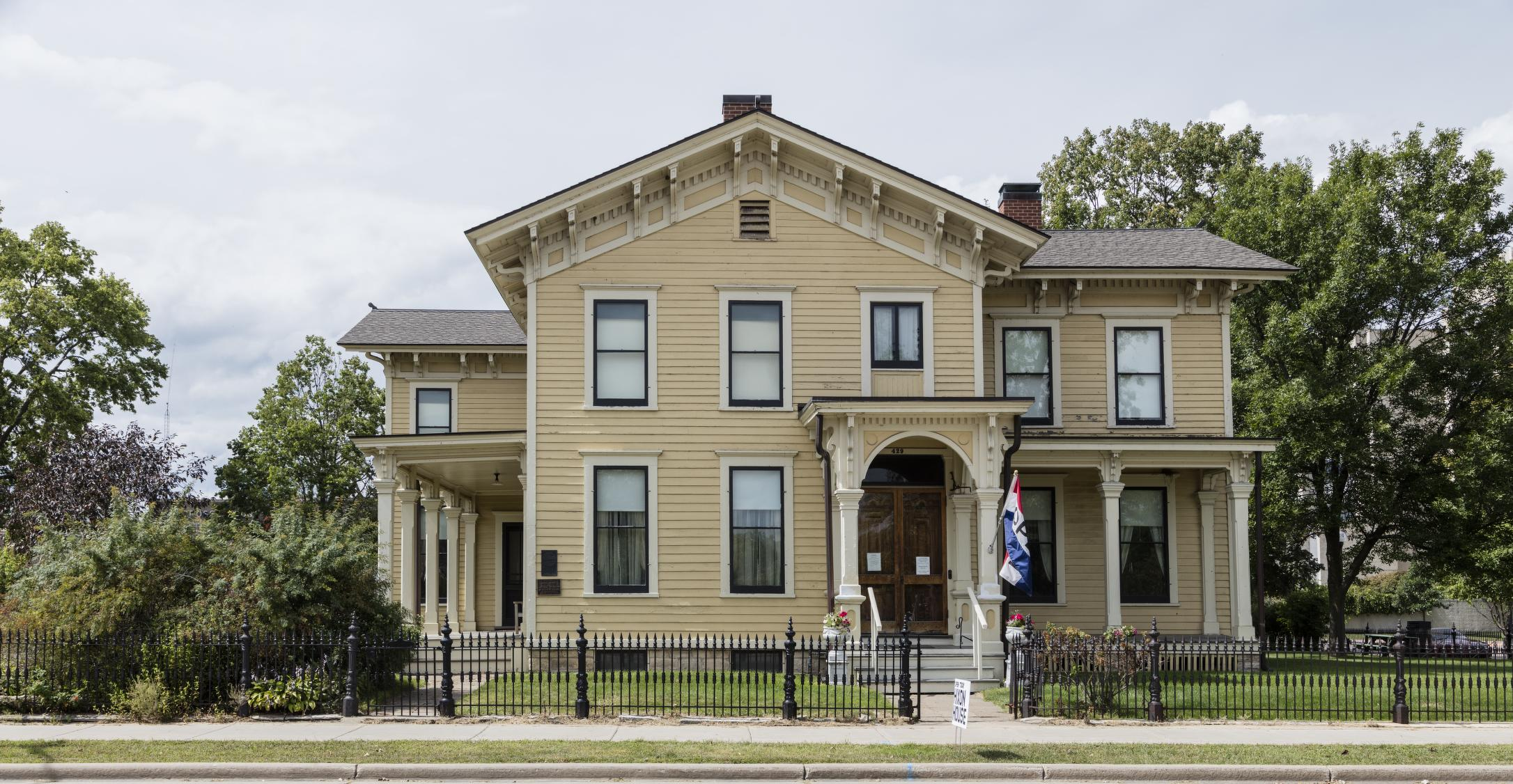
- Gideon C. Hixon House

- Location within Wisconsin Location within the United States
- Location: 429 N. 7th St. La Crosse, Wisconsin
- Coordinates: 43.8158°N 91.2471°W
- Area: less than one acre
- Built: 1859
- Architectural style: Italianate
- NRHP reference No.: 74000095
- Added to NRHP: December 30, 1974

The Gideon C. Hixon House is a historic residence built in 1859 and located in La Crosse, Wisconsin. The house was built for Gideon Hixon, a partner in a lumber business. Hixon would later become a founder and president of the La Cross National Bank and would serve in the state legislature. The house was added to the National Register of Historic Places in 1974.

== Architecture ==
The two-story Italianate room house was built in 1859. Made of clapboard, the house features a shallow pitch roof with a substantial overhand and carved wooden brackets. The rather modest exterior is offset by the more richly appointed interior, furnished with artifacts acquired by the wealthy Mr. Hixon during national and overseas travel.

Additions were made to the house in 1870 and again in the early 1880s. The house is owned by the La Crosse County Historical Society and has been restored and maintained as it existed at the end of the 19th century.

== Gallery ==
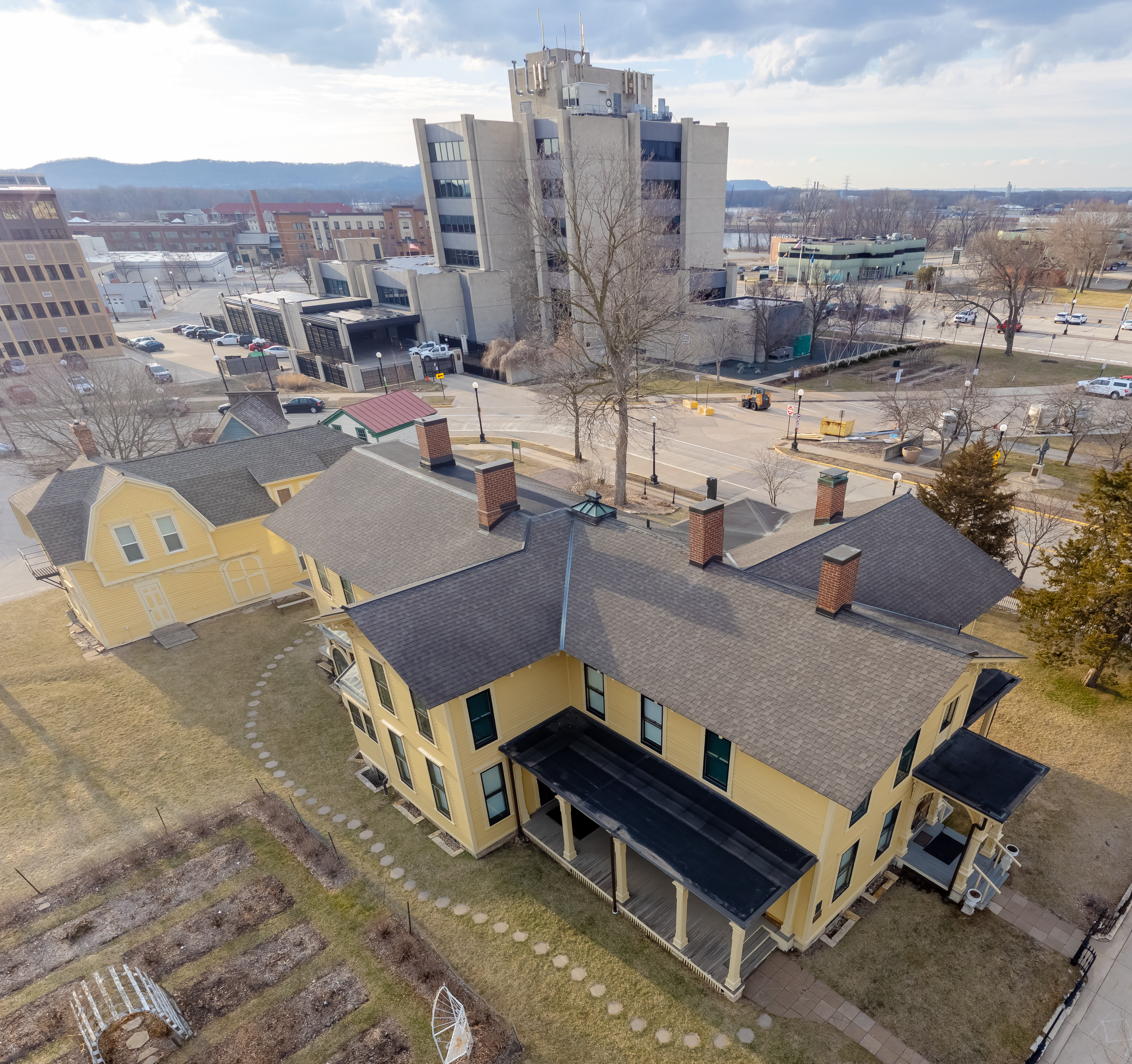
Hixon house

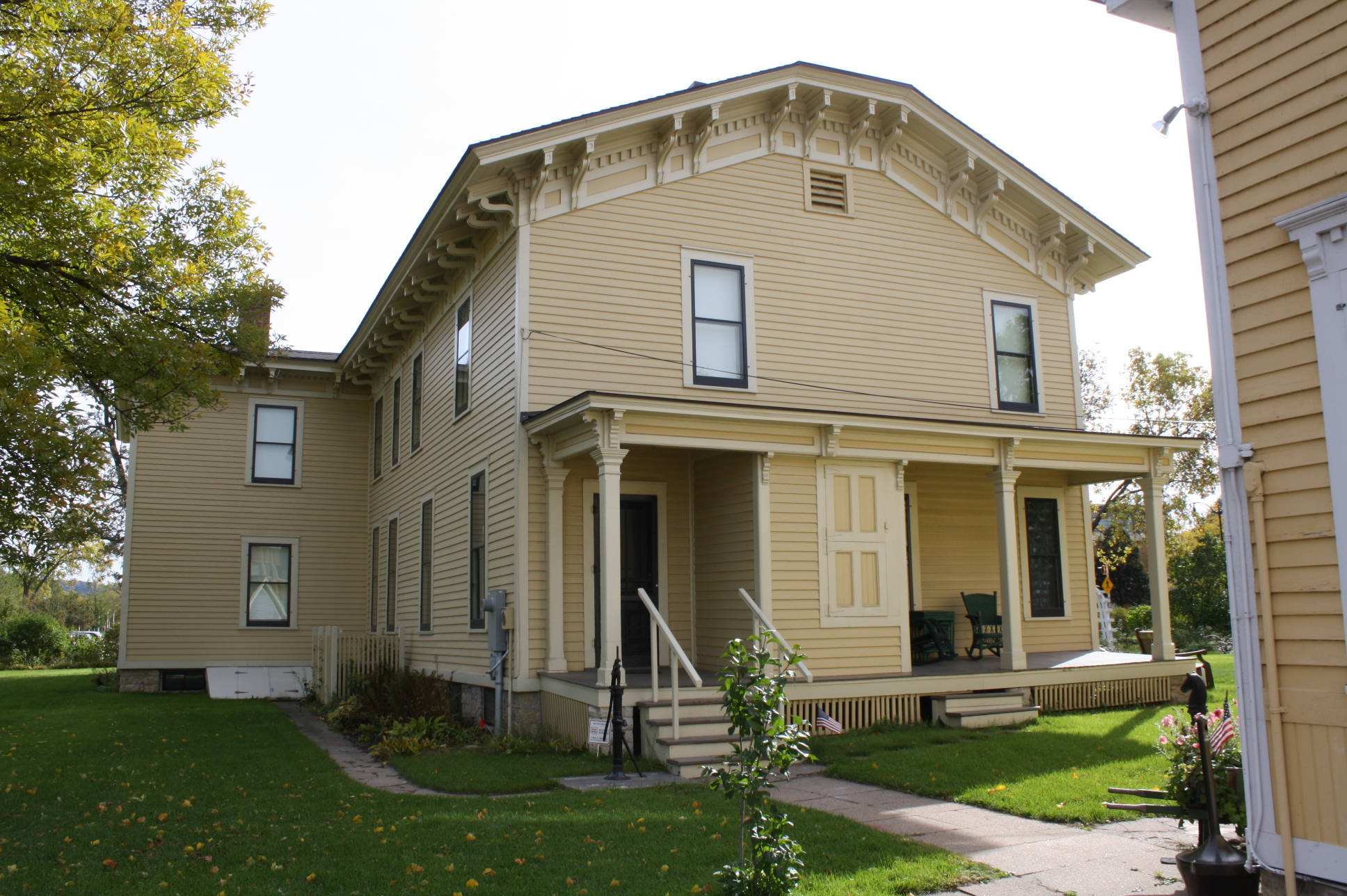
Rear

== See also ==
- The Freight House
