= Theodore Rodolf =

19th century American politician

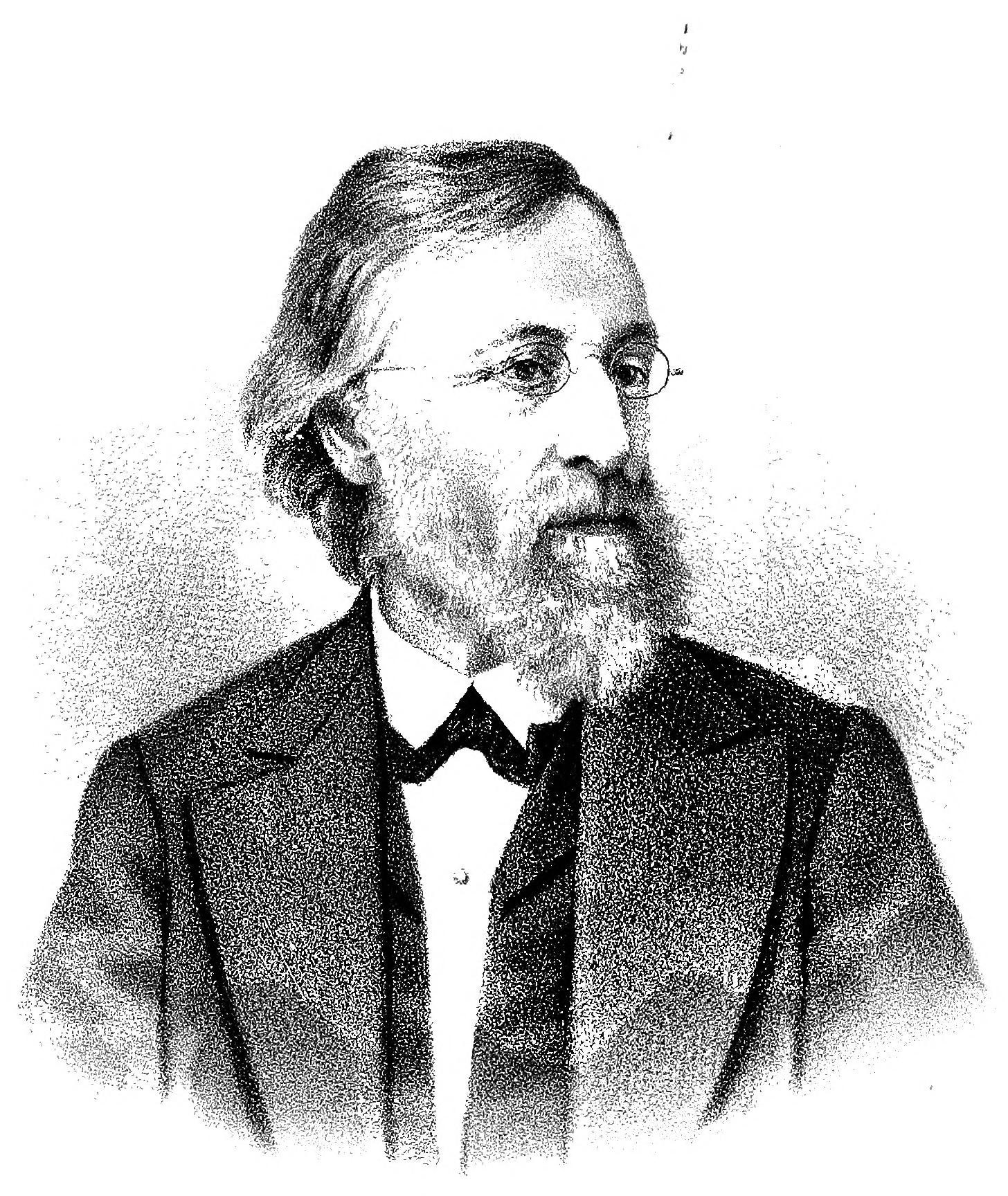
- Portrait from History of La Crosse County, Wisconsin (1881)

10th & 12th Mayor of La Crosse, Wisconsin
- In office April 1870 – April 1871
- Preceded by: Charles L. Coleman
- Succeeded by: Alexander McMillan
- In office April 1868 – April 1869
- Preceded by: John M. Levy
- Succeeded by: Charles L. Coleman

Member of the Wisconsin State Assembly from the La Crosse 1st district
- In office January 3, 1870 – January 2, 1871
- Preceded by: Cassius C. Palmer
- Succeeded by: Gideon Hixon
- In office January 6, 1868 – January 4, 1869
- Preceded by: Angus Cameron
- Succeeded by: Cassius C. Palmer

Personal details
- Born: October 17, 1814 Switzerland
- Died: February 12, 1892 (aged 77) La Crosse, Wisconsin, U.S.
- Resting place: Oak Grove Cemetery, La Crosse, Wisconsin
- Party: Democratic
- Spouse: Marie A. Rodolf (died 1892)
- Children: M. E. Julie Rodolf^{(b. 1840; died 1900)}; Theodore F. Rodolf^{(b. 1842; died 1887)}; Emilie (Servis)^{(b. 1843; died 1934)}; A. J. Henriette Rodolf^{(b. 1845; died 1865)}; Edward G. Rodolf^{(b. 1848; died 1904)}; Adele Rodolf^{(b. 1850; died 1861)}; Cora M. (Copeland)^{(b. 1851; died 1935)}; Eugene F. Rodolf^{(b. 1853; died 1861)}; Charles B. Rodolf^{(b. 1859; died 1871)}
- Parents: Johanne Friedrick Rodolf^{(b. 1788; died 1834)}; Emerence Emerensinia Koller^{(b. 1784; died 1856)}
- Relatives: Charles Rodolf (brother)
- Education: University of Zurich
- Occupation: Insurance agent

Theodore Rodolf (October 17, 1814 – February 12, 1892) was a Swiss American immigrant, Democratic politician, and Wisconsin pioneer. He was the 10th and 12th mayor of La Crosse, Wisconsin, and represented La Crosse for two terms in the Wisconsin State Assembly.

His brother, Charles Rodolf, also served in the Wisconsin Legislature.

== Biography ==
Rodolf was born on October 17, 1814, in Switzerland. He graduated from the University of Zurich before emigrating to the United States in 1834. He settled in the area that is now Lafayette County, Wisconsin—at the time, the area was still part of the Michigan Territory. He died in La Crosse on February 12, 1892, after an illness lasting more than a year.

His brother, Charles Rodolf, was a member of the Assembly and of the Wisconsin Senate.

== Career ==
While living in Mineral Point, Wisconsin, he served as village president in 1851 and 1852. He was appointed Receiver of Public Moneys at La Crosse, Wisconsin, by President Franklin Pierce in 1853, and served in that role until 1861.

Rodolf was elected to the Assembly running on the Democratic Party ticket in 1867. The next year, rather than running for re-election, he was a candidate for the U.S. House of Representatives in Wisconsin's 6th congressional district. He lost to incumbent Cadwallader C. Washburn, but went on to win back his seat in the Assembly in the 1869 election. During the same time, he was elected mayor of La Crosse in the 1868 and 1870 Spring elections.

Wisconsin State Assembly
| Preceded by Angus Cameron | Member of the Wisconsin State Assembly from the La Crosse 1st district January 6, 1868 – January 4, 1869 | Succeeded by Cassius C. Palmer |
| Preceded by Cassius C. Palmer | Member of the Wisconsin State Assembly from the La Crosse 1st district January 3, 1870 – January 2, 1871 | Succeeded by Gideon Hixon |
Political offices
| Preceded by John M. Levy | Mayor of La Crosse, Wisconsin; April 1868 – April 1869 | Succeeded by Charles L. Coleman |
| Preceded by Charles L. Coleman | Mayor of La Crosse, Wisconsin; April 1870 – April 1871 | Succeeded by Alexander McMillan |
