= James DeMott Condit =

American politician and soldier (1821–1863)

James DeMott Condit (April 22, 1821 – September 27, 1863) was a member of the Wisconsin State Assembly.

== Biography ==
Condit was born on April 22, 1821. On October 5, 1848, he married Sarah A. Veazie. They had three children before her death on September 21, 1876. Condit later married Abby M. Barker on May 20, 1878.

During the American Civil War, Condit was a captain with the 25th Wisconsin Volunteer Infantry Regiment of the Union Army. Events he participated in include the siege of Vicksburg. Condit's brother, Ambrose, accompanied the regiment as a sutler. During this time, Ambrose's health began to fail, forcing him to leave. Eventually, he died on September 27, 1863. He had been Postmaster and Register of Deeds of Sparta, Wisconsin, where James was a hotel proprietor.

== Assembly career ==
Condit was a member of the Assembly from La Crosse County, Wisconsin during the 1858 session and from Monroe County, Wisconsin during the 1878 and 1879 sessions. He was a Democrat.
