= William H. McCardle =

American historian and journalist (1815–1893)

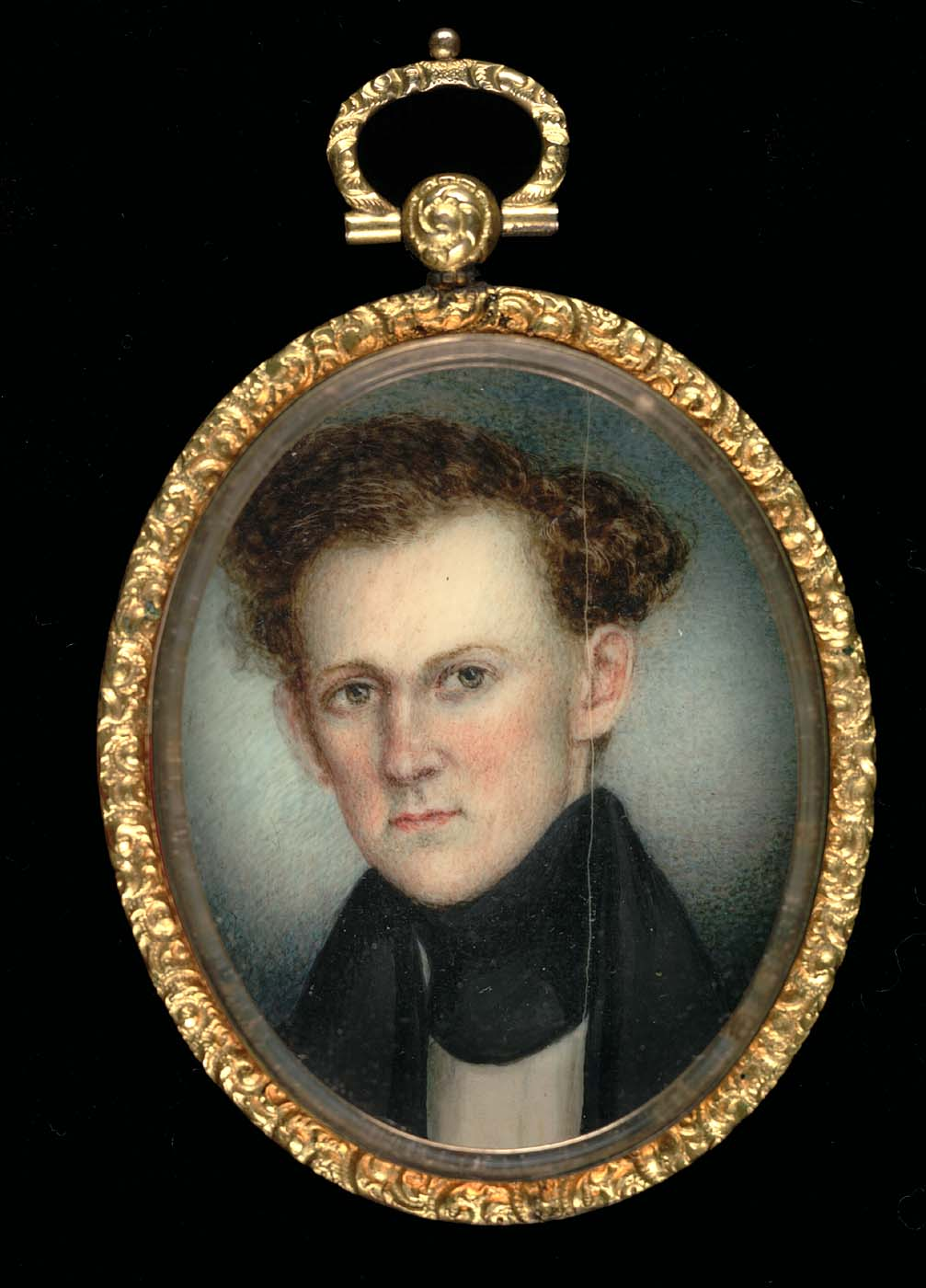
- Born: June 1, 1815; Maysville, Kentucky, U.S.
- Died: April 28, 1893 (aged 77); Jackson, Mississippi, U.S.
- Occupations: Writer & Editor
- Spouse: Annie E. Fort
- Children: 3

William H. McCardle (June 1, 1815 - April 28, 1893) was a writer and editor who ran a newspaper in Mississippi called the True Southron. It was an "independent States' Rights journal." The True Southron was founded with materials left over from the closure of the Know-Nothing paper The American Times, and after two years was itself folded into the Southern Sun of Vicksburg and Yazoo City.

Sometime after 1857 he dueled with I. M. Partridge of the Vicksburg Whig, shooting Partridge in the ankle. In 1866, he was arrested by military authorities under the Reconstruction Act and appealed to the United States Supreme Court in Ex parte McCardle, but the U.S. Congress removed the court's jurisdiction. He was accused of disturbing the peace, inciting insurrection, libel, and impeding Reconstruction for publishing articles denouncing Reconstruction policies and its military commanders.

McCardle was never tried and the charges against him were later dropped. Nevertheless, he was spent three years in prison, not being released until 1869.

He married Annie E. Fort and had three children: Annie F., Battle, and Mary W. He co-authored A History of Mississippi with former Mississippi governor Robert Lowry. He edited the Vicksburg Times newspaper in Vicksburg, Mississippi. The Smithsonian has a miniature watercolor on ivory depiction of him.
