= The Vicksburg Times =

Former American newspaper

- Type: Daily newspaper
- Publisher: Harvey Shannon
- Founded: 1866
- Headquarters: Vicksburg, Mississippi, U.S.
- OCLC number: 10199994

The Vicksburg Times, which became the Vicksburg Daily Times, was a newspaper in Vicksburg, Mississippi in the United States. The paper was established in 1866 by Harvey Shannon and Thomas Bolling Manlove who bought out The Journal.

William H. McCardle bought out Manlove's share the following summer and served as the paper's editor until January 1869. Giles M. Hillyer succeeded him briefly until retiring when the paper was sold. It became a Republican paper after being purchased and merged with the Vicksburg Republican and became the Daily Times and Republican.

It had government printing contracts.
