= Wisconsin's 14th Senate district =

American legislative district in central Wisconsin

Wisconsin's 14th State Senate district
- 2024 map defined in 2023 Wisc. Act 94; 2022 map defined in Johnson v. Wisconsin Elections Commission; 2011 map was defined in 2011 Wisc. Act 43 composed of Assembly districts 40, 41, and 42
Senator
Sarah Keyeski; D–Lodi
since January 6, 2025 (1 year, 155 days)
- Demographics: 89.68% White; 2.04% Black; 4.19% Hispanic; 1.53% Asian; 1.92% Native American; 0.11% Hawaiian/Pacific Islander
- Population (2020) • Voting age: 178,351; 139,260
- Website: Official website
- Notes: Central Wisconsin

The 14th Senate district of Wisconsin is one of 33 districts in the Wisconsin Senate. Located in central Wisconsin, the district comprises all of Richland and Sauk counties, along with most of Columbia County and parts of southern Adams County, southeastern Vernon County, southern Juneau County, and northern Dane County. It contains the cities of Baraboo, Columbus, Portage, Reedsburg, Richland Center, and Wisconsin Dells, and the villages of DeForest, Lake Delton, Poynette, Prairie du Sac, and Sauk City, and part of the city of Madison. The district also contains landmarks such as Devil's Lake State Park, Dane County Regional Airport, Mirror Lake State Park, Lake Wisconsin and the Kilbourn Dam.

== Current elected officials ==
Sarah Keyeski is the senator representing the 14th district. She was first elected in the 2024 general election.

Each Wisconsin State Senate district is composed of three Wisconsin State Assembly districts. The 14th Senate district comprises the 40th, 41st, and 42nd Assembly districts. The current representatives of those districts are:

- Assembly District 40: Karen DeSanto (D–Baraboo)
- Assembly District 41: Tony Kurtz (R–Wonewoc)
- Assembly District 42: Maureen McCarville (D–DeForest)

The 14th Senate district crosses three congressional districts. The portions of the district in Adams, Juneau, Richland, and Vernon counties are within Wisconsin's 3rd congressional district, represented by U.S. Representative Derrick Van Orden; the portions of the district in Dane and Sauk counties are within Wisconsin's 2nd congressional district, represented by U.S. Representative Mark Pocan; the portion of the district in Columbia County is within Wisconsin's 6th congressional district, represented by U.S. Representative Glenn Grothman.

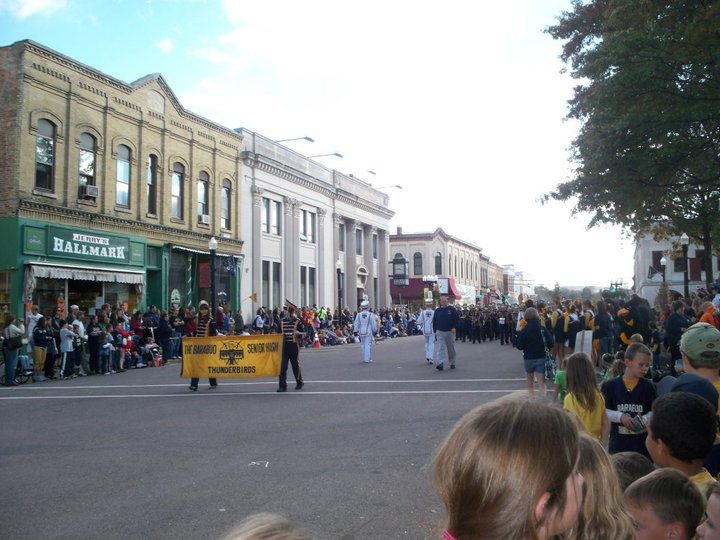
Baraboo, Wisconsin

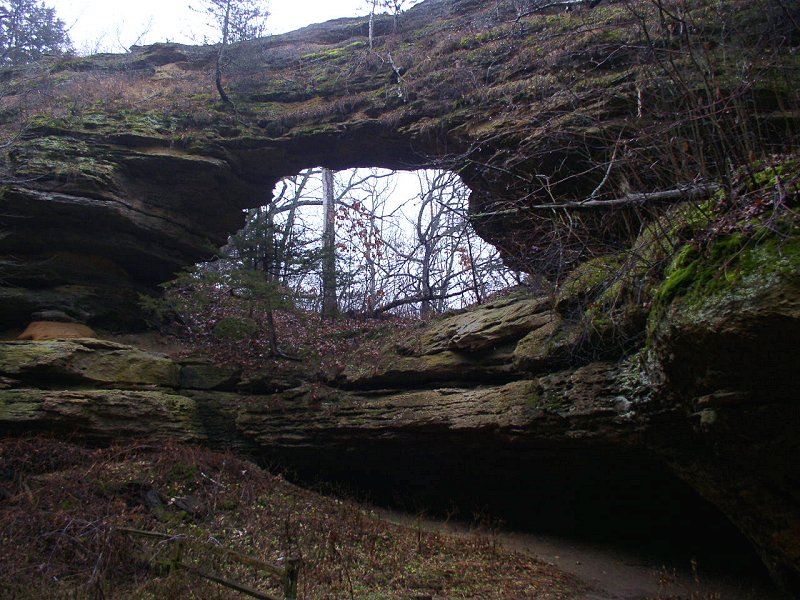
Natural Bridge State Park

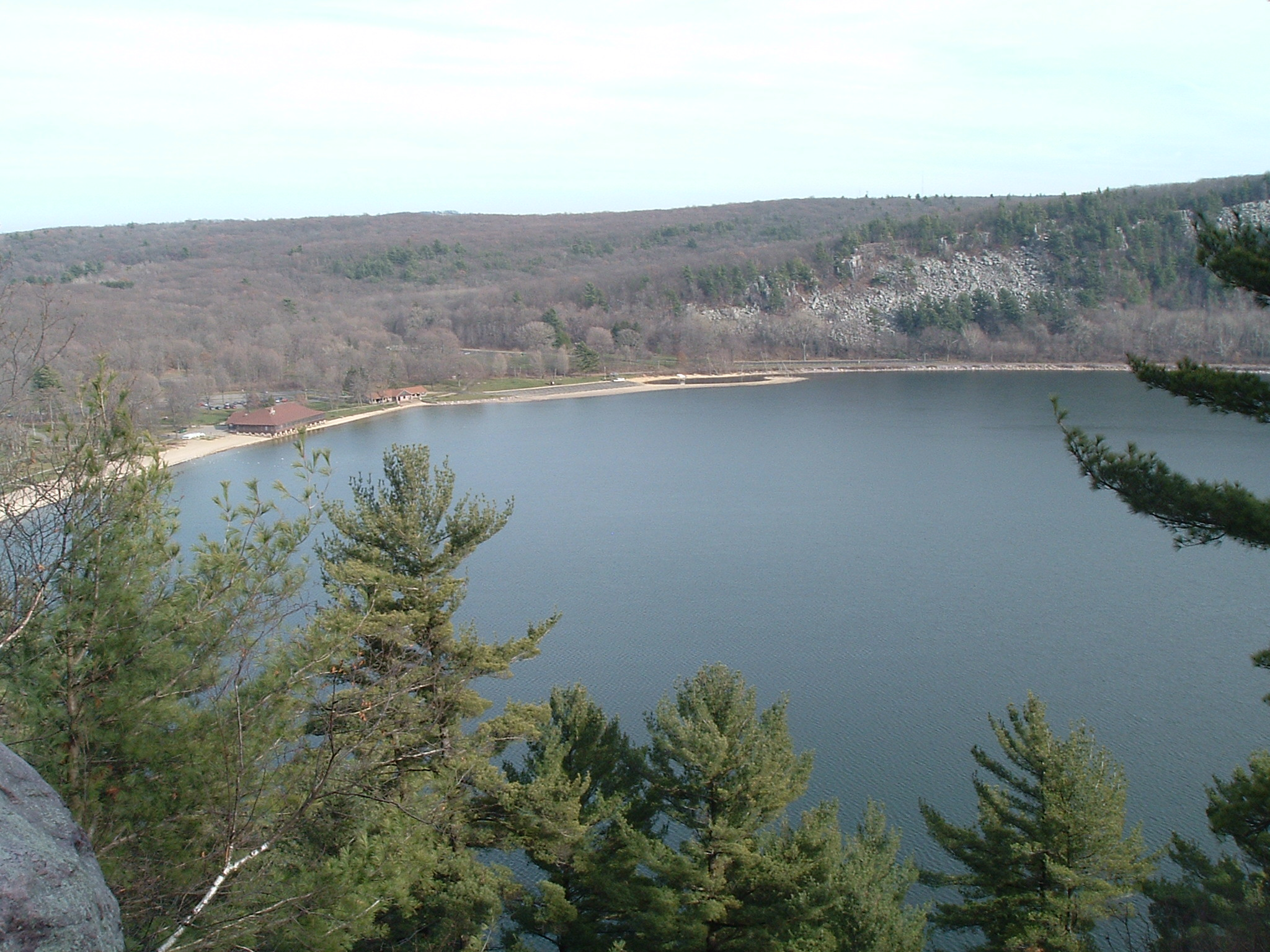
Devil's Lake State Park

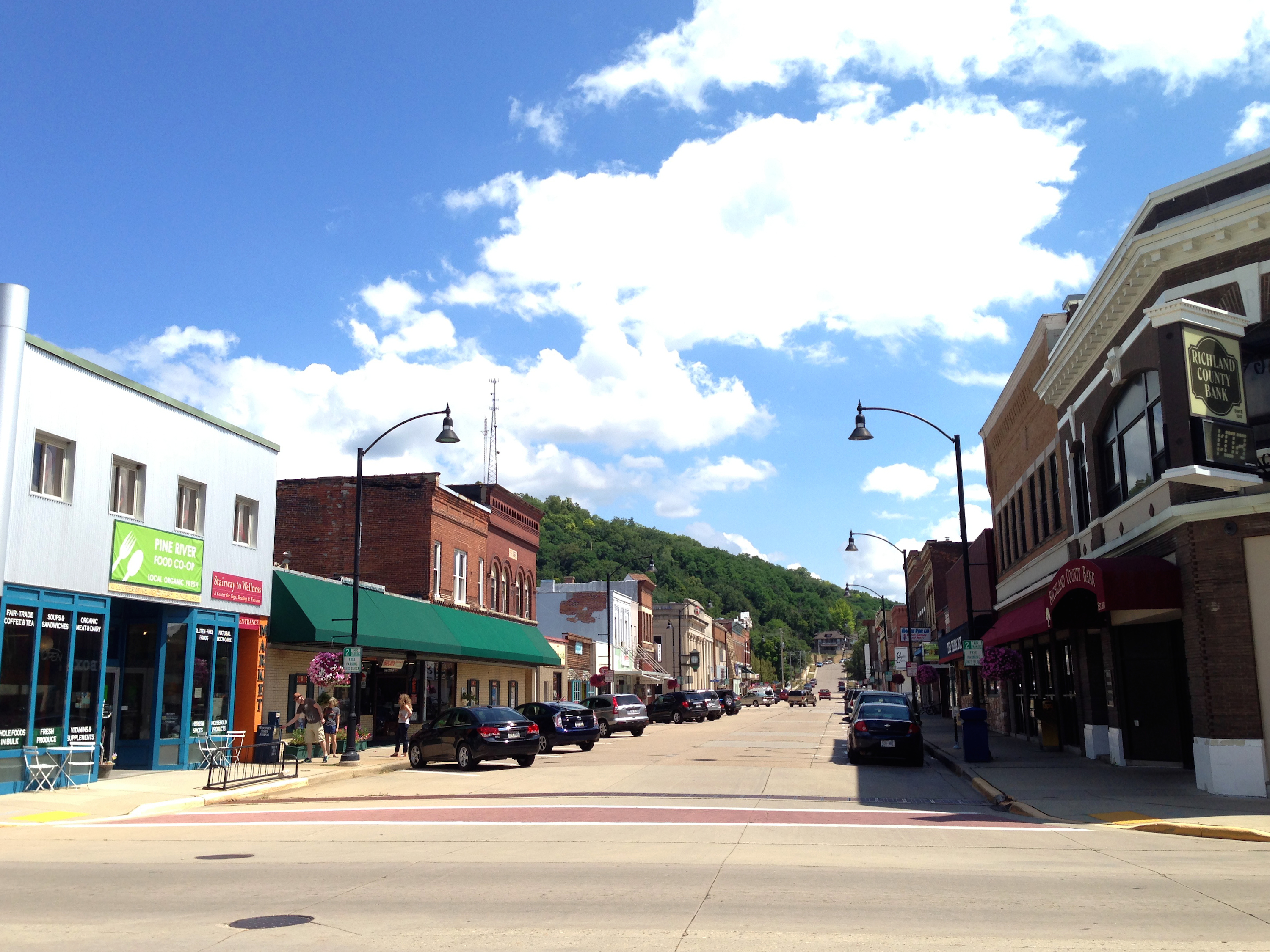
Downtown Richland Center

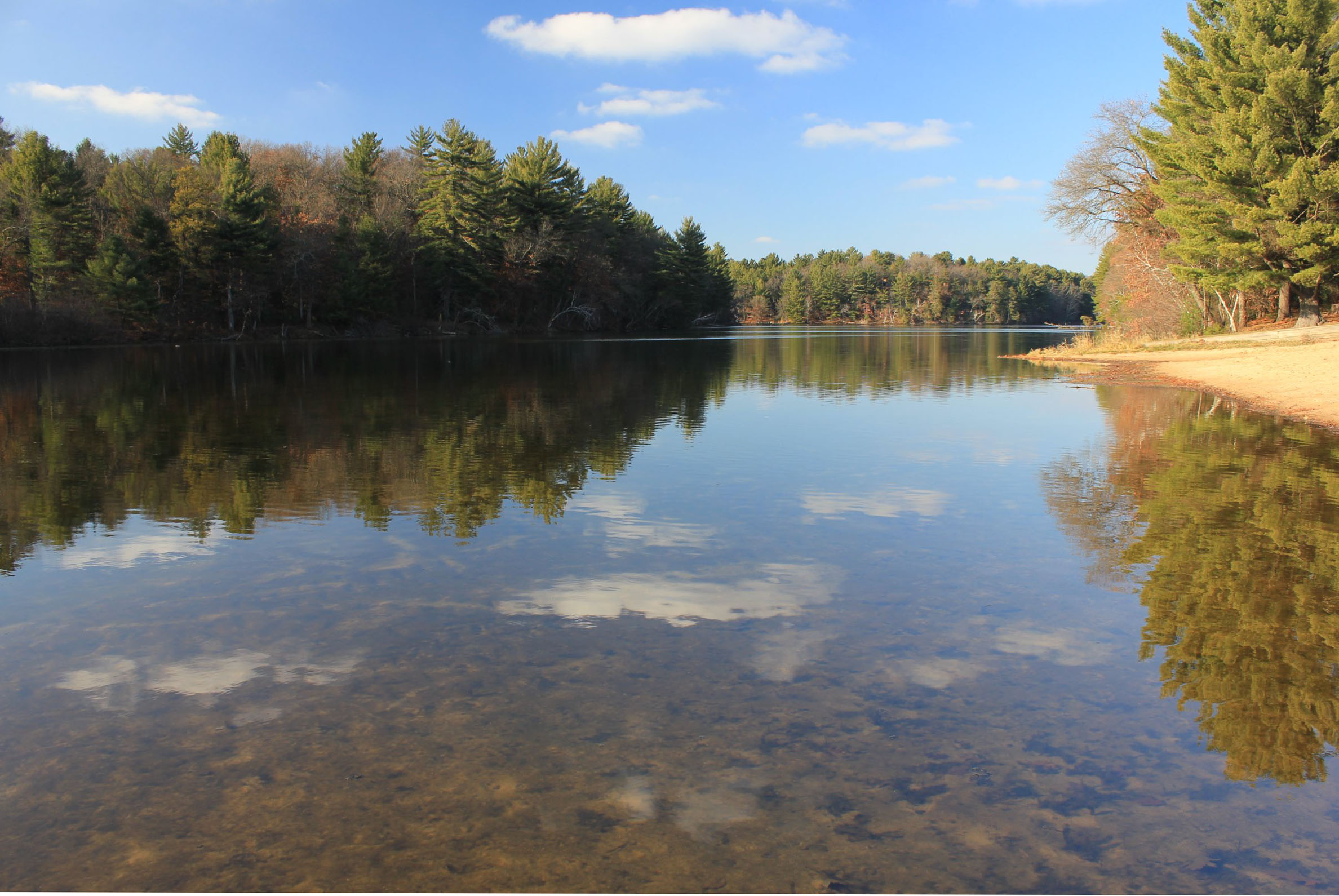
Mirror Lake State Park

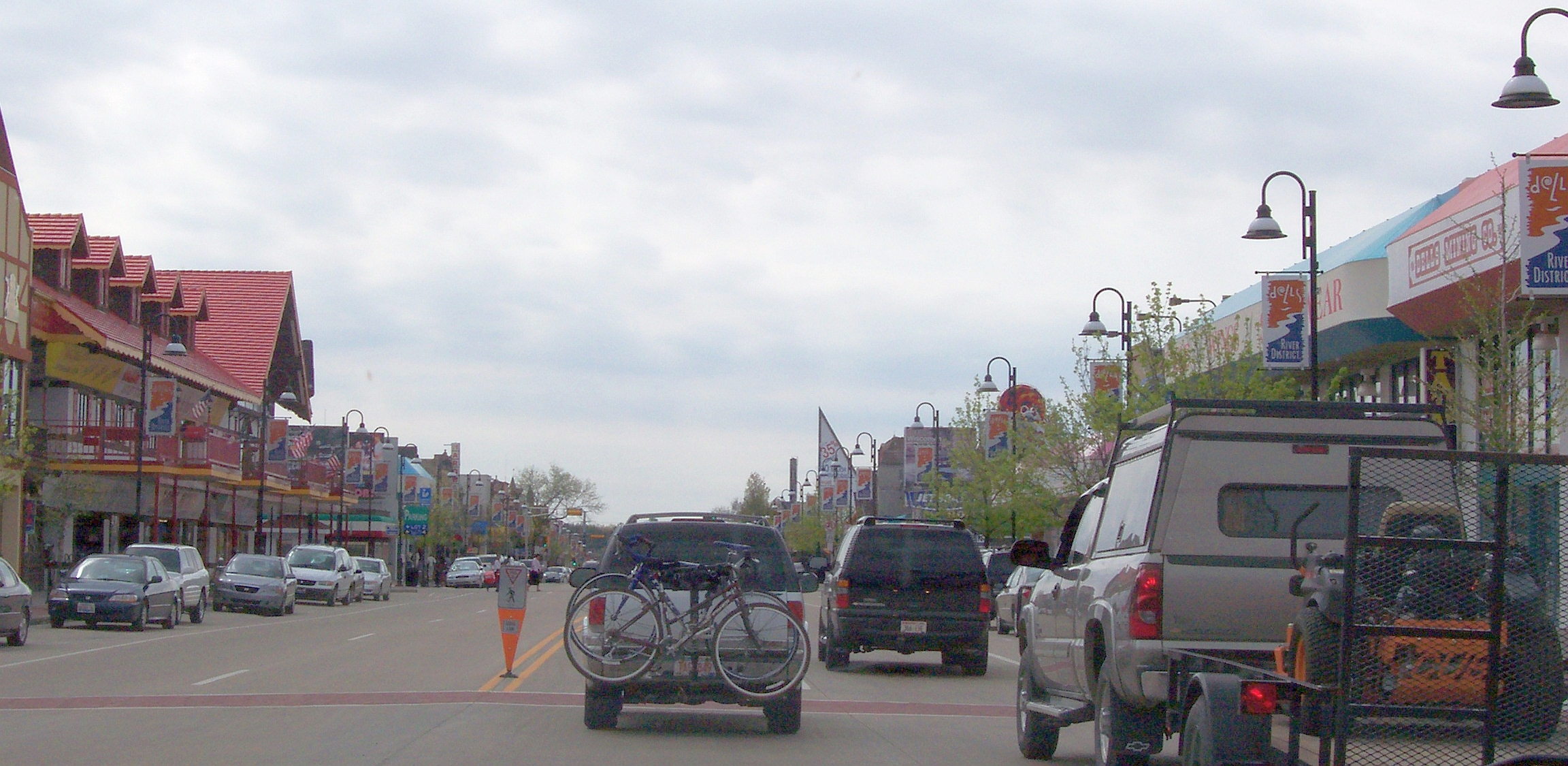
Downtown Wisconsin Dells

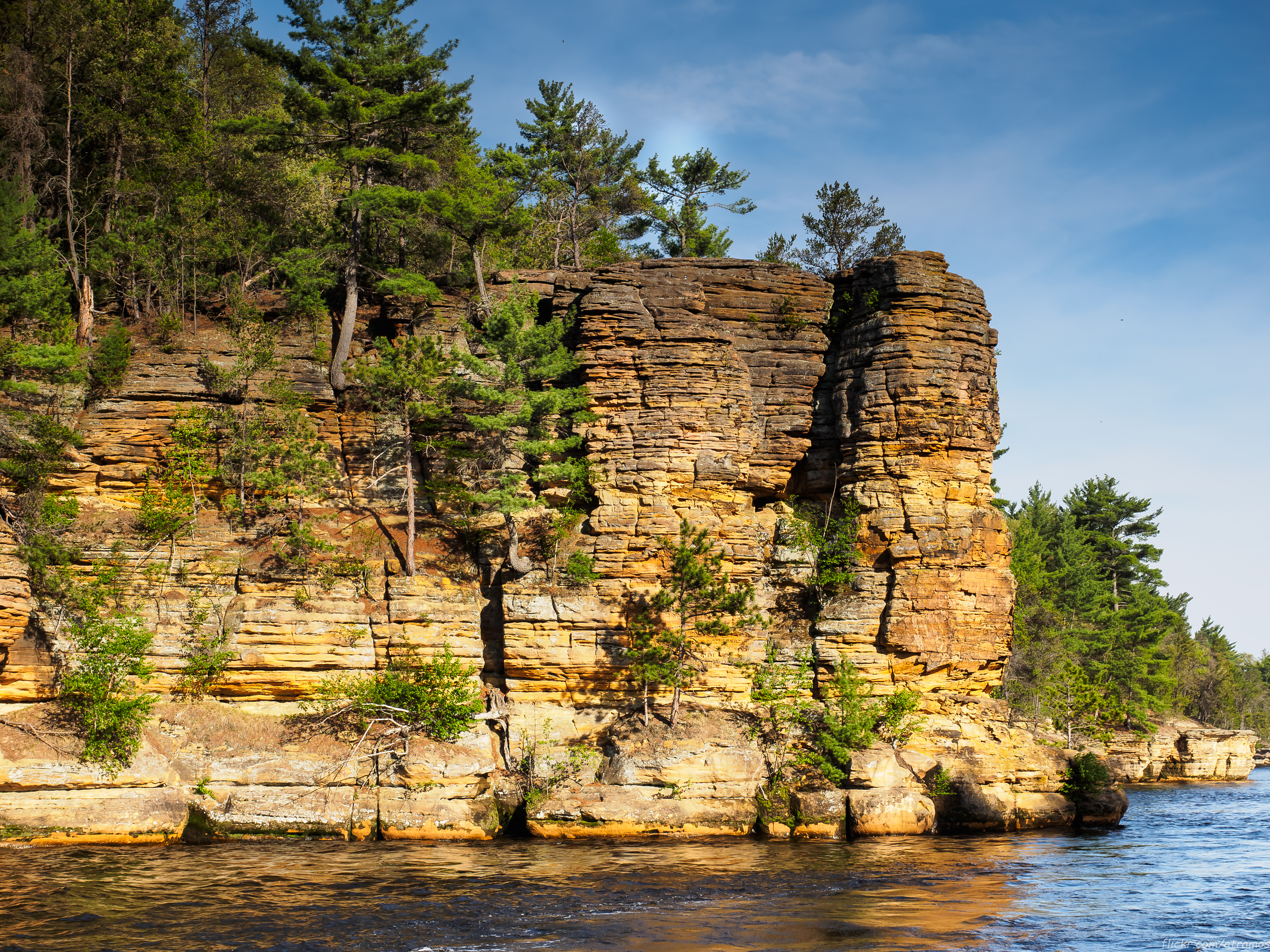
Dells of the Wisconsin River

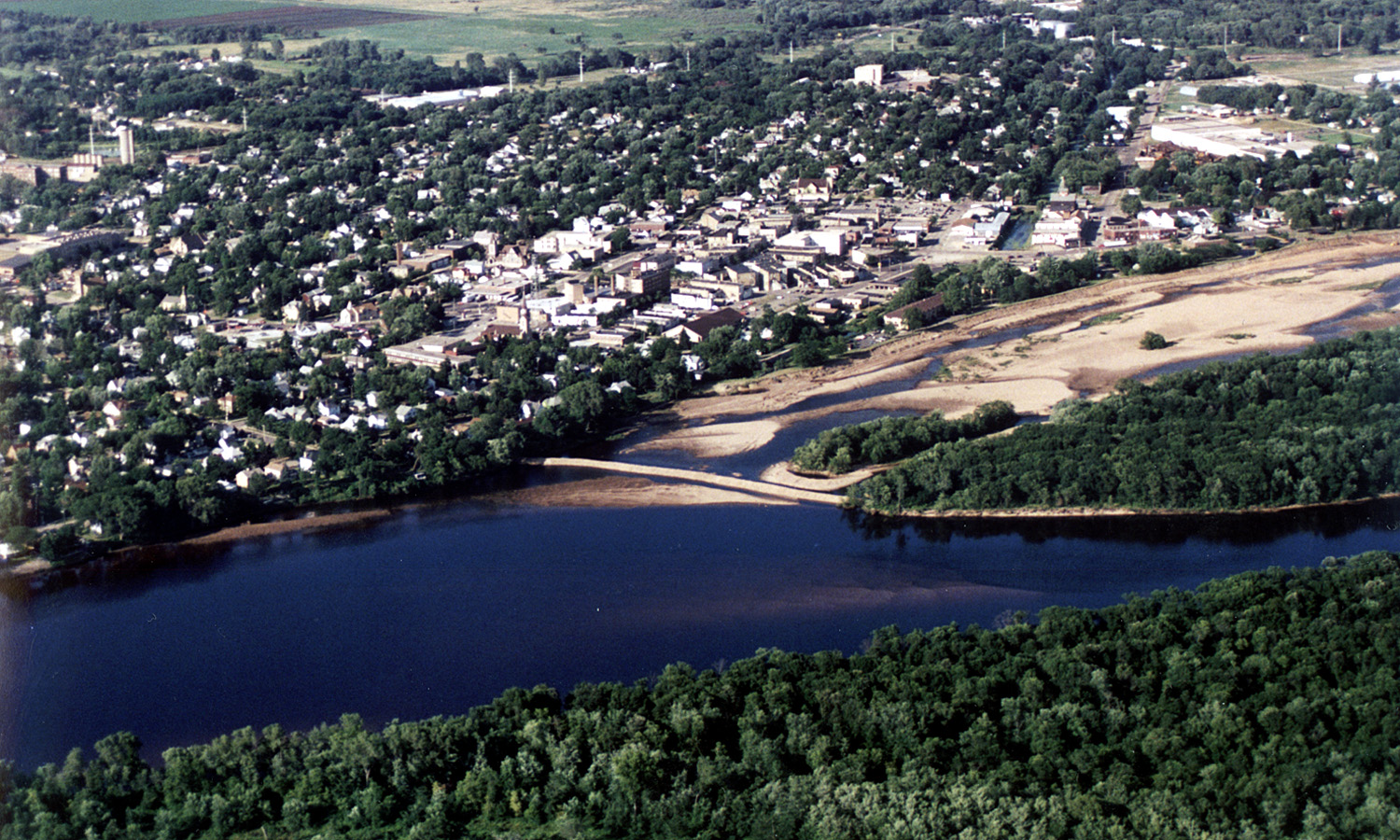
Aerial view of Portage

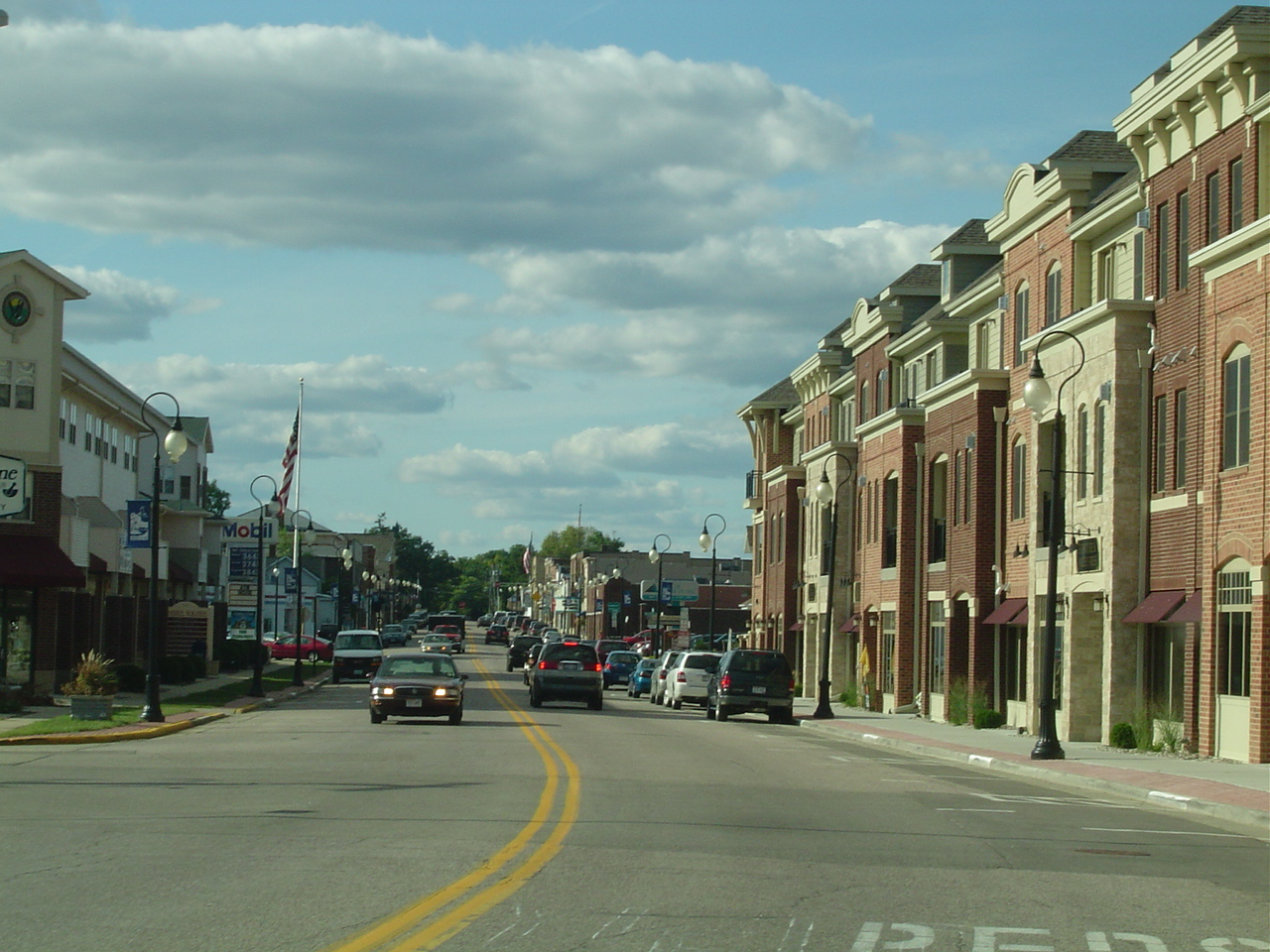
Downtown Prairie du Sac.

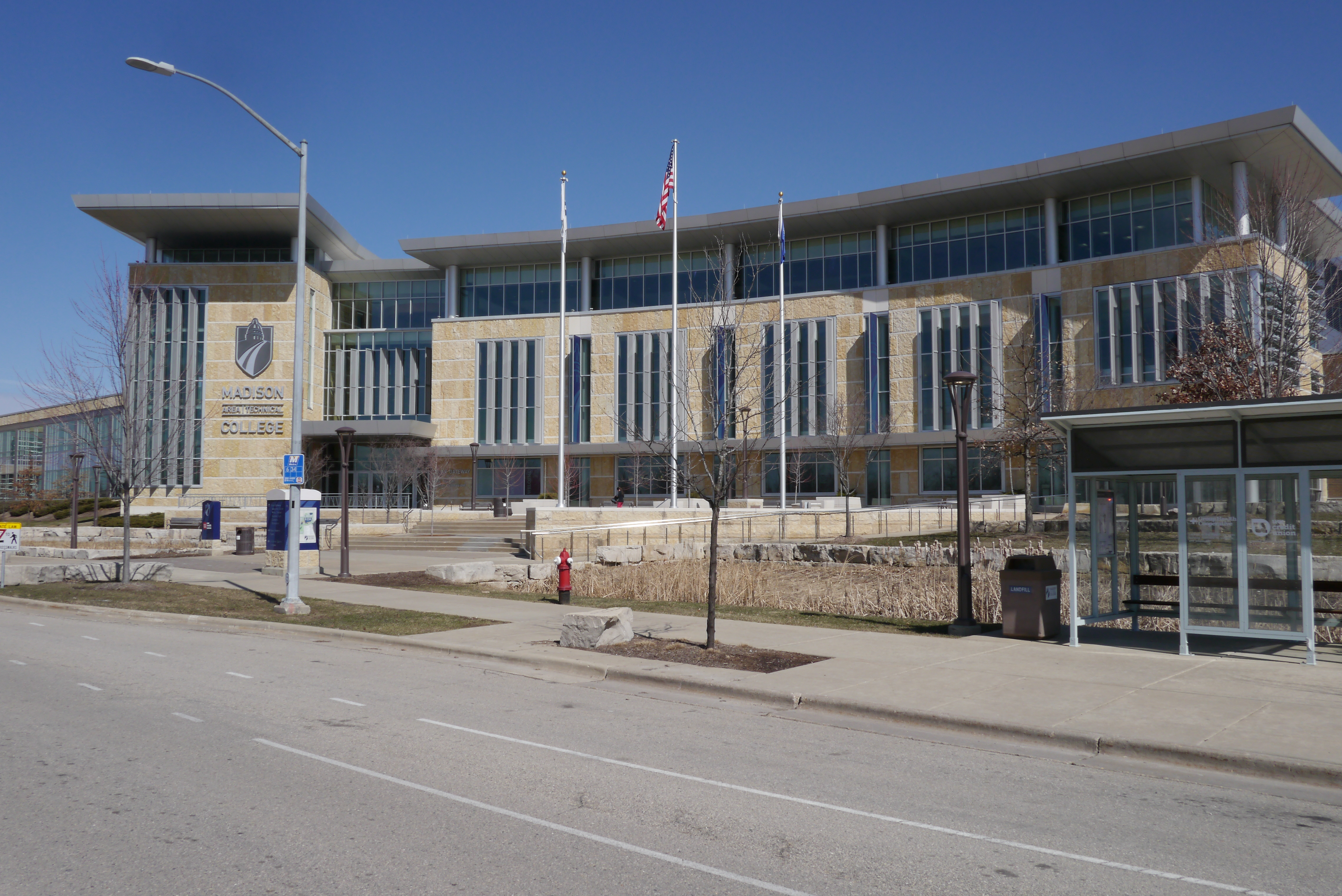
Madison Area Technical College

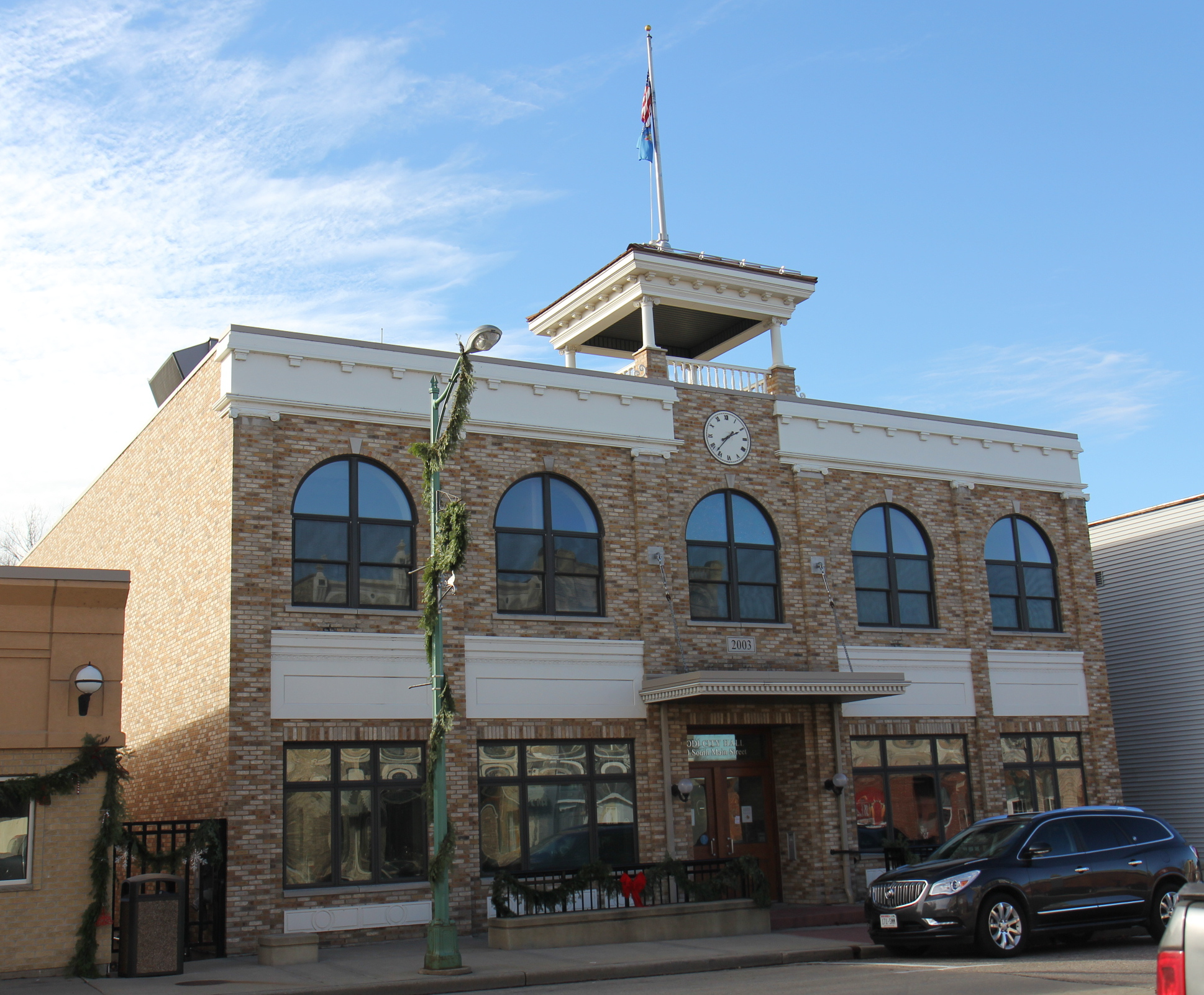
City Hall of Lodi

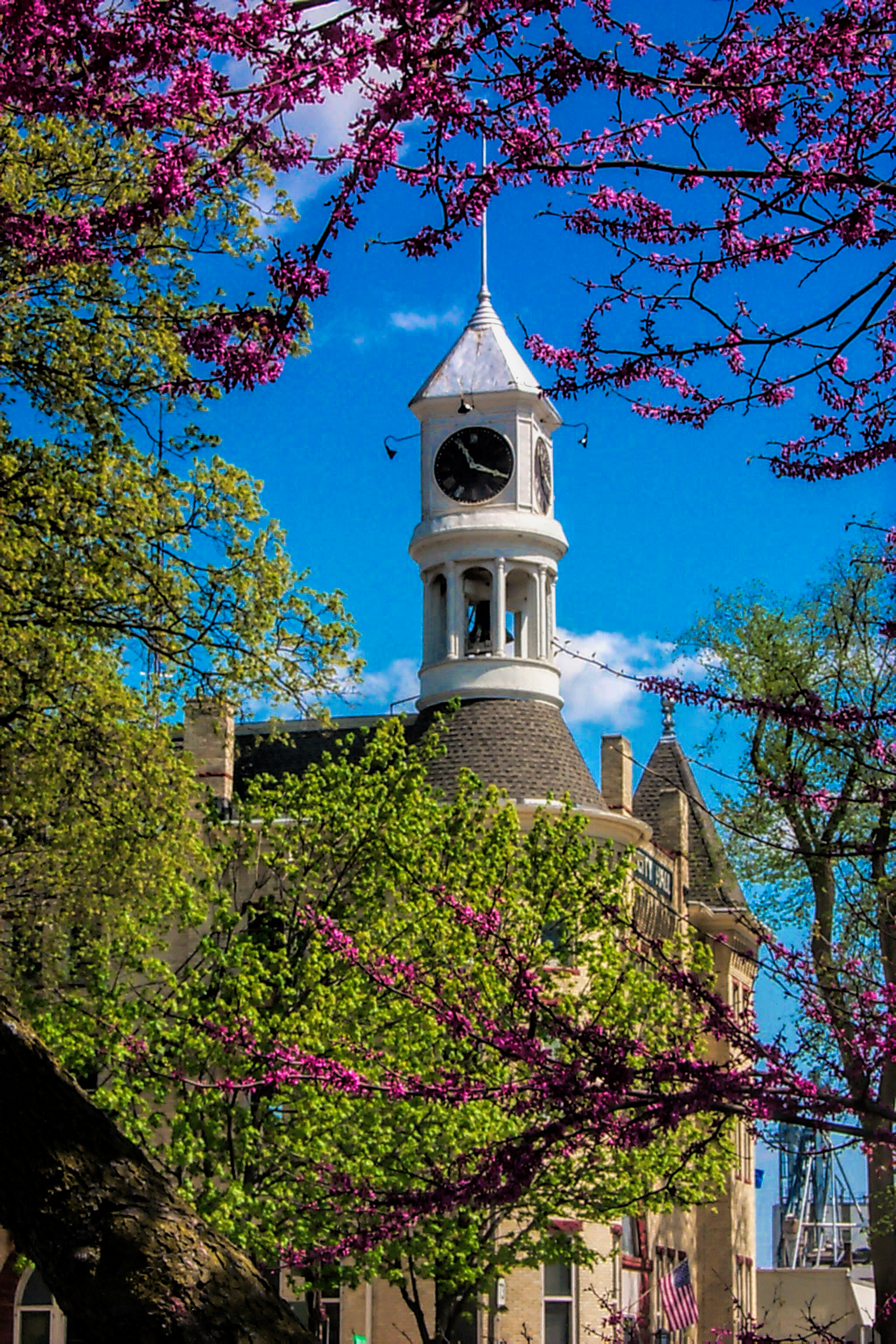
Historic City Hall, in Columbus

== Past senators ==
Previous senators include:

Note: the boundaries of districts have changed repeatedly over history. Previous politicians of a specific numbered district have represented a completely different geographic area, due to redistricting.

Senator	Party	Notes	Session	Years	District Definition
--District created--				1848	Walworth County
John W. Boyd	Dem.		1st	1848	Walworth County
John W. Boyd	Dem.		2nd	1849	Walworth County
George Gale	Free Soil		3rd	1850	Walworth County
George Gale	Free Soil		4th	1851	Walworth County
Eleazer Wakeley	Dem.	Redistricted to 12th district.	5th	1852	Walworth County
Alva Stewart	Whig	Redistricted from 12th district.	6th	1853	Jefferson County
Daniel Howell	Dem.		7th	1854	Jefferson County
Daniel Howell	Dem.		8th	1855	Jefferson County
S. W. Barnes	Dem.		9th	1856	Jefferson County
S. W. Barnes	Dem.		10th	1857	Southern Dodge County & northern Jefferson County: Dodge County; Town of Ashippun; Town of Emmet; Town of Lebanon; Town of Portland; Town of Shields; Jefferson County; Town of Ixonia; Town of Waterloo; Town of Watertown; City of Watertown
William Chappell	Dem.		11th	1858	Southern Dodge County & northern Jefferson County: Dodge County; Town of Ashippun; Town of Emmet; Town of Lebanon; Town of Portland; Town of Shields; Jefferson County; Town of Ixonia; Town of Waterloo; Town of Watertown; City of Watertown
William Chappell	Dem.		12th	1859	Southern Dodge County & northern Jefferson County: Dodge County; Town of Ashippun; Town of Emmet; Town of Lebanon; Town of Portland; Town of Shields; Jefferson County; Town of Ixonia; Town of Waterloo; Town of Watertown; City of Watertown
Charles R. Gill	Rep.		13th	1860	Southern Dodge County & northern Jefferson County: Dodge County; Town of Ashippun; Town of Emmet; Town of Lebanon; Town of Portland; Town of Shields; Jefferson County; Town of Ixonia; Town of Waterloo; Town of Watertown; City of Watertown
Charles R. Gill	Rep.		14th	1861	Southern Dodge County & northern Jefferson County: Dodge County; Town of Ashippun; Town of Emmet; Town of Lebanon; Town of Portland; Town of Shields; Jefferson County; Town of Ixonia; Town of Waterloo; Town of Watertown; City of Watertown
Smith S. Wilkinson	Rep.		15th	1862	1861–1865 1866–1870 1871–1875; Sauk County
Smith S. Wilkinson	Rep.		16th	1863	1861–1865 1866–1870 1871–1875; Sauk County
Smith S. Wilkinson	Natl. Union		17th	1864	1861–1865 1866–1870 1871–1875; Sauk County
Smith S. Wilkinson	Natl. Union		18th	1865	1861–1865 1866–1870 1871–1875; Sauk County
Argalus Starks	Natl. Union		19th	1866	1861–1865 1866–1870 1871–1875; Sauk County
Argalus Starks	Natl. Union		20th	1867	1861–1865 1866–1870 1871–1875; Sauk County
Stephen S. Barlow	Rep.		21st	1868	1861–1865 1866–1870 1871–1875; Sauk County
Stephen S. Barlow	Rep.		22nd	1869	1861–1865 1866–1870 1871–1875; Sauk County
Bennett Strong	Rep.		23rd	1870	1861–1865 1866–1870 1871–1875; Sauk County
Bennett Strong	Rep.		24th	1871	1861–1865 1866–1870 1871–1875; Sauk County
John B. Quimby	Rep.		25th	1872	1861–1865 1866–1870 1871–1875; Sauk County
John B. Quimby	Rep.		26th	1873	1861–1865 1866–1870 1871–1875; Sauk County
John B. Quimby	Rep.		27th	1874	1861–1865 1866–1870 1871–1875; Sauk County
John B. Quimby	Rep.		28th	1875	1861–1865 1866–1870 1871–1875; Sauk County
David E. Welch	Rep.		29th	1876	1861–1865 1866–1870 1871–1875; Sauk County
David E. Welch	Rep.		30th	1877	1876–1881 1882–1887 1888–1891; Juneau & Sauk counties
David E. Welch	Rep.		31st	1878	1876–1881 1882–1887 1888–1891; Juneau & Sauk counties
David E. Welch	Rep.		32nd	1879	1876–1881 1882–1887 1888–1891; Juneau & Sauk counties
Edwin E. Woodman	Rep.		33rd	1880	1876–1881 1882–1887 1888–1891; Juneau & Sauk counties
Edwin E. Woodman	Rep.		34th	1881	1876–1881 1882–1887 1888–1891; Juneau & Sauk counties
John T. Kingston	Rep.		35th	1882	1876–1881 1882–1887 1888–1891; Juneau & Sauk counties
John T. Kingston	Rep.		36th	1883–1884	1876–1881 1882–1887 1888–1891; Juneau & Sauk counties
David B. Hulburt	Rep.		37th	1885–1886	1876–1881 1882–1887 1888–1891; Juneau & Sauk counties
David B. Hulburt	Rep.		38th	1887–1888	1876–1881 1882–1887 1888–1891; Juneau & Sauk counties
Frank Avery	Rep.		39th	1889–1890	1876–1881 1882–1887 1888–1891; Juneau & Sauk counties
Frank Avery	Rep.		40th	1891–1892	1876–1881 1882–1887 1888–1891; Juneau & Sauk counties
Dayne Wescott	Dem.		41st	1893–1894	Florence, Forest, Langlade, Lincoln, and Shawano counties
Dayne Wescott	Dem.		42nd	1895–1896	Florence, Forest, Langlade, Lincoln, and Shawano counties
Alexander B. Whitman	Rep.		43rd	1897–1898	1896–1901 1902–1911 1912–1921 1922–1953; Outagamie & Shawano counties
Alexander B. Whitman	Rep.		44th	1899–1900	1896–1901 1902–1911 1912–1921 1922–1953; Outagamie & Shawano counties
Theophilus A. Willy	Rep.		45th	1901–1902	1896–1901 1902–1911 1912–1921 1922–1953; Outagamie & Shawano counties
Theophilus A. Willy	Rep.		46th	1903–1904	1896–1901 1902–1911 1912–1921 1922–1953; Outagamie & Shawano counties
Fred M. Wilcox	Rep.		47th	1905–1906	1896–1901 1902–1911 1912–1921 1922–1953; Outagamie & Shawano counties
Fred M. Wilcox	Rep.		48th	1907–1908	1896–1901 1902–1911 1912–1921 1922–1953; Outagamie & Shawano counties
J. Elmer Lehr	Rep.	Disqualified Mar. 1912. (Note: Lehr moved from Outagamie County to Milwaukee in February 1911, and did not return to the Legislature. In March 1912, the Attorney General and Governor ruled that his seat was vacant and a special election should be called.)	49th	1909–1910	1896–1901 1902–1911 1912–1921 1922–1953; Outagamie & Shawano counties
J. Elmer Lehr	Rep.	Disqualified Mar. 1912.	50th	1911–1912	1896–1901 1902–1911 1912–1921 1922–1953; Outagamie & Shawano counties
--Vacant--			50th	1911–1912	1896–1901 1902–1911 1912–1921 1922–1953; Outagamie & Shawano counties
Henry N. Culbertson	Rep.	Won 1912 special election.	50th	1911–1912	1896–1901 1902–1911 1912–1921 1922–1953; Outagamie & Shawano counties
Henry N. Culbertson	Rep.	Won 1912 special election.	51st	1913–1914	1896–1901 1902–1911 1912–1921 1922–1953; Outagamie & Shawano counties
Henry N. Culbertson	Rep.	Won 1912 special election.	52nd	1915–1916	1896–1901 1902–1911 1912–1921 1922–1953; Outagamie & Shawano counties
Antone Kuckuk	Rep.		53rd	1917–1918	1896–1901 1902–1911 1912–1921 1922–1953; Outagamie & Shawano counties
Antone Kuckuk	Rep.		54th	1919–1920	1896–1901 1902–1911 1912–1921 1922–1953; Outagamie & Shawano counties
Antone Kuckuk	Rep.		55th	1921–1922	1896–1901 1902–1911 1912–1921 1922–1953; Outagamie & Shawano counties
Antone Kuckuk	Rep.		56th	1923–1924	1896–1901 1902–1911 1912–1921 1922–1953; Outagamie & Shawano counties
John Englund	Rep.		57th	1925–1926	1896–1901 1902–1911 1912–1921 1922–1953; Outagamie & Shawano counties
John Englund	Rep.		58th	1927–1928	1896–1901 1902–1911 1912–1921 1922–1953; Outagamie & Shawano counties
Anton M. Miller	Rep.		59th	1929–1930	1896–1901 1902–1911 1912–1921 1922–1953; Outagamie & Shawano counties
Anton M. Miller	Rep.		60th	1931–1932	1896–1901 1902–1911 1912–1921 1922–1953; Outagamie & Shawano counties
Mike Mack	Rep.	Resigned 1942 after appointed to Wisconsin Highway Commission.	61st	1933–1934	1896–1901 1902–1911 1912–1921 1922–1953; Outagamie & Shawano counties
Mike Mack	Rep.	Resigned 1942 after appointed to Wisconsin Highway Commission.	62nd	1935–1936	1896–1901 1902–1911 1912–1921 1922–1953; Outagamie & Shawano counties
Mike Mack	Rep.	Resigned 1942 after appointed to Wisconsin Highway Commission.	63rd	1937–1938	1896–1901 1902–1911 1912–1921 1922–1953; Outagamie & Shawano counties
Mike Mack	Rep.	Resigned 1942 after appointed to Wisconsin Highway Commission.	64th	1939–1940	1896–1901 1902–1911 1912–1921 1922–1953; Outagamie & Shawano counties
Mike Mack	Rep.	Resigned 1942 after appointed to Wisconsin Highway Commission.	65th	1941–1942	1896–1901 1902–1911 1912–1921 1922–1953; Outagamie & Shawano counties
--Vacant--			65th	1941–1942	1896–1901 1902–1911 1912–1921 1922–1953; Outagamie & Shawano counties
John F. Lappen	Rep.	Won 1942 special election.	66th	1943–1944	1896–1901 1902–1911 1912–1921 1922–1953; Outagamie & Shawano counties
Gordon A. Bubolz	Rep.	Resigned 1954.	67th	1945–1946	1896–1901 1902–1911 1912–1921 1922–1953; Outagamie & Shawano counties
Gordon A. Bubolz	Rep.	Resigned 1954.	68th	1947–1948	1896–1901 1902–1911 1912–1921 1922–1953; Outagamie & Shawano counties
Gordon A. Bubolz	Rep.	Resigned 1954.	69th	1949–1950	1896–1901 1902–1911 1912–1921 1922–1953; Outagamie & Shawano counties
Gordon A. Bubolz	Rep.	Resigned 1954.	70th	1951–1952	1896–1901 1902–1911 1912–1921 1922–1953; Outagamie & Shawano counties
Gordon A. Bubolz	Rep.	Resigned 1954.	71st	1953–1954	1896–1901 1902–1911 1912–1921 1922–1953; Outagamie & Shawano counties
--Vacant--			71st	1953–1954	1896–1901 1902–1911 1912–1921 1922–1953; Outagamie & Shawano counties
Gerald D. Lorge	Rep.	Won 1954 special election.	72nd	1955–1956	1954–1963 1964–1971; Outagamie & Waupaca counties
Gerald D. Lorge	Rep.	Won 1954 special election.	73rd	1957–1958	1954–1963 1964–1971; Outagamie & Waupaca counties
Gerald D. Lorge	Rep.	Won 1954 special election.	74th	1959–1960	1954–1963 1964–1971; Outagamie & Waupaca counties
Gerald D. Lorge	Rep.	Won 1954 special election.	75th	1961–1962	1954–1963 1964–1971; Outagamie & Waupaca counties
Gerald D. Lorge	Rep.	Won 1954 special election.	76th	1963–1964	1954–1963 1964–1971; Outagamie & Waupaca counties
Gerald D. Lorge	Rep.	Won 1954 special election.	77th	1965–1966	1954–1963 1964–1971; Outagamie & Waupaca counties
Gerald D. Lorge	Rep.	Won 1954 special election.	78th	1967–1968	1954–1963 1964–1971; Outagamie & Waupaca counties
Gerald D. Lorge	Rep.	Won 1954 special election.	79th	1969–1970	1954–1963 1964–1971; Outagamie & Waupaca counties
Gerald D. Lorge	Rep.	Won 1954 special election.	80th	1971–1972	1954–1963 1964–1971; Outagamie & Waupaca counties
Gerald D. Lorge	Rep.	Won 1954 special election.	81st	1973–1974	Waupaca County & most of Outagamie County & southern Shawano County: Outagamie County; Town of Black Creek; Town of Bovina; Town of Center; Town of Cicero; Town of Dale; Town of Deer Creek; Town of Ellington; Town of Freedom; Town of Grand Chute; Town of Greenville; Town of Hortonia; Town of Liberty; Town of Maine; Town of Maple Creek; Town of Oneida; Town of Seymour; Town of Vandenbroek; Village of Black Creek; Village of Hortonville; Village of Nichols; Village of Shiocton; City of Seymour; The part of the city of Appleton; Shawano County; Town of Belle Plaine; Town of Fairbanks; Town of Germania; Town of Lessor; Town of Maple Grove; Town of Navarino; Town of Pella; Village of Tigerton
Gerald D. Lorge	Rep.	Won 1954 special election.	82nd	1975–1976	
Gerald D. Lorge	Rep.	Won 1954 special election.	83rd	1977–1978	
Gerald D. Lorge	Rep.	Won 1954 special election.	84th	1979–1980	
Gerald D. Lorge	Rep.	Won 1954 special election.	85th	1981–1982	
Gerald D. Lorge	Rep.	Won 1954 special election.	86th	1983–1984	Adams, Green Lake, Juneau, Marquette, & Waushara counties, & eastern Waupaca County, part of Fond du Lac County, western of Outagamie County & part of Winnebago County: Fond du Lac County; Town of Alto; Town of Metomen; Town of Ripon; Village of Brandon; Village of Fairwater; City of Ripon; Outagamie County; Town of Bovina; Town of Dale; Town of Deer Creek; Town of Ellington; Town of Greenville; Town of Hortonia; Town of Liberty; Town of Maple Creek; Village of Bear Creek; Village of Hortonville; Village of Shiocton; City of New London; Waupaca County; Town of Bear Creek; Town of Caledonia; Town of Fremont; Town of Larrabee; Town of Lebanon; Town of Lind; Town of Little Wolf; Town of Matteson; Town of Mukwa; Town of Royalton; Town of Waupaca; Town of Weyauwega; Village of Embarrass; Village of Fremont; City of Clintonville; City of Manawa; City of Waupaca; City of New London; Winnebago County; Town of Poygan; Town of Wolf River
Joseph Leean	Rep.	Resigned Jul. 1995.	87th	1985–1986	Green Lake, Marquette, & Waushara counties, & southern Adams County, part of Columbia County, part of Fond du Lac County, most of Juneau County, part of Monroe County, northwest Outagamie County, part of Sauk County, most of Waupaca County, & western Winnebago County: Adams County; Town of Colburn; Town of Dell Prairie; Town of Easton; Town of Jackson; Town of Leola; Town of Lincoln; Town of New Chester; Town of New Haven; Town of Richfield; Town of Springville; Columbia County; City of Wisconsin Dells; Fond du Lac County; Town of Alto; Town of Metomen; Town of Ripon; Village of Brandon; Village of Fairwater; City of Ripon; Juneau County; Town of Armenia; Town of Clearfield; Town of Cutler; Town of Finley; Town of Fountain; Town of Germantown; Town of Kingston; Town of Lemonweir; Town of Lindina; Town of Lisbon; Town of Marion; Town of Necedah; Town of Orange; Town of Plymouth; Town of Wonewoc; Village of Camp Douglas; Village of Hustler; Village of Necedah; Village of Union Center; Village of Wonewoc; City of Elroy; City of Mauston; City of New Lisbon; City of Wisconsin Dells; Monroe County; Town of Glendale; Town of Ridgeville; Town of Sheldon; Town of Wellington; Town of Wilton; Village of Kendall; Village of Norwalk; Village of Wilton; Outagamie County; Town of Deer Creek; Town of Ellington; Town of Hortonia; Town of Liberty; Town of Maine; Town of Maple Creek; Village of Bear Creek; Village of Hortonville; City of New London; Sauk County; City of Wisconsin Dells; Waupaca County; Town of Bear Creek; Town of Caledonia; Town of Dayton; Town of Dupont; Town of Fremont; Town of Helvetia; Town of Larrabee; Town of Lebanon; Town of Lind; Town of Little Wolf; Town of Matteson; Town of Mukwa; Town of Royalton; Town of Scandinavia; Town of St. Lawrence; Town of Union; Town of Waupaca; Town of Weyauwega; Village of Embarrass; Village of Fremont; Village of Iola; Village of Ogdensburg; Village of Scandinavia; City of Clintonville; City of Manawa; City of Marion; City of New London; City of Waupaca; City of Weyauwega; Winnebago County; Town of Nepeuskun; Town of Poygan; Town of Rushford; Town of Wolf River
Joseph Leean	Rep.	Resigned Jul. 1995.	88th	1987–1988	
Joseph Leean	Rep.	Resigned Jul. 1995.	89th	1989–1990	
Joseph Leean	Rep.	Resigned Jul. 1995.	90th	1991–1992	
Joseph Leean	Rep.	Resigned Jul. 1995.	91st	1993–1994	Green Lake & Marquette counties, & southern Adams County, northwest Columbia County, part of Fond du Lac County, part of Outagamie County, part of Sauk County, most of Waupaca County, most of Waushara County, & part of Winnebago County: Adams County; Town of Dell Prairie; Town of Jackson; Town of New Haven; Town of Springville; City of Wisconsin Dells; Columbia County; Town of Caledonia; Town of Fort Winnebago; Town of Lewiston; Town of Marcellon; Town of Newport; Town of Wyocena; Village of Pardeeville; Village of Wyocena; City of Portage; City of Wisconsin Dells; Fond du Lac County; Town of Alto; Town of Metomen; Town of Ripon; Village of Brandon; Village of Fairwater; City of Ripon; Outagamie County; Town of Deer Creek; Town of Hortonia; Town of Maple Creek; Village of Bear Creek; City of New London; Sauk County; Town of Baraboo; Town of Greenfield; Town of Merrimac; Village of Lake Delton; Village of Merrimac; Village of West Baraboo; City of Baraboo; City of Wisconsin Dells; Waupaca County; Town of Bear Creek; Town of Caledonia; Town of Dayton; Town of Dupont; Town of Farmington; Town of Fremont; Town of Helvetia; Town of Iola; Town of Larrabee; Town of Lebanon; Town of Lind; Town of Little Wolf; Town of Matteson; Town of Mukwa; Town of Royalton; Town of Scandinavia; Town of St. Lawrence; Town of Union; Town of Waupaca; Town of Weyauwega; Village of Embarrass; Village of Fremont; Village of Iola; Village of Ogdensburg; Village of Scandinavia; City of Clintonville; City of Manawa; City of Marion; City of Waupaca; City of Weyauwega; City of New London; Waushara County; Town of Aurora; Town of Bloomfield; Town of Coloma; Town of Dakota; Town of Deerfield; Town of Hancock; Town of Leon; Town of Marion; Town of Mount Morris; Town of Poysippi; Town of Richford; Town of Saxeville; Town of Springwater; Town of Warren; Town of Wautoma; Village of Coloma; Village of Hancock; Village of Lohrville; Village of Redgranite; Village of Wild Rose; City of Wautoma; City of Berlin; Winnebago County; Town of Nepeuskun; Town of Rushford
Joseph Leean	Rep.	Resigned Jul. 1995.	92nd	1995–1996	
--Vacant--			92nd	1995–1996	
Robert T. Welch	Rep.	Won 1995 special election.	92nd	1995–1996	
Robert T. Welch	Rep.	Won 1995 special election.	93rd	1997–1998	
Robert T. Welch	Rep.	Won 1995 special election.	94th	1999–2000	
Robert T. Welch	Rep.	Won 1995 special election.	95th	2001–2002	
Robert T. Welch	Rep.	Won 1995 special election.	96th	2003–2004	Green Lake County and Most of Marquette County; Most of Waupaca County; Most of Waushara County; Northern Columbia County; Northeast Sauk County; Part of Adams County; Part of Fond du Lac County; Part of Outagamie County
Luther Olsen	Rep.		97th	2005–2006	Green Lake County and Most of Marquette County; Most of Waupaca County; Most of Waushara County; Northern Columbia County; Northeast Sauk County; Part of Adams County; Part of Fond du Lac County; Part of Outagamie County
Luther Olsen	Rep.		98th	2007–2008	Green Lake County and Most of Marquette County; Most of Waupaca County; Most of Waushara County; Northern Columbia County; Northeast Sauk County; Part of Adams County; Part of Fond du Lac County; Part of Outagamie County
Luther Olsen	Rep.		99th	2009–2010	Green Lake County and Most of Marquette County; Most of Waupaca County; Most of Waushara County; Northern Columbia County; Northeast Sauk County; Part of Adams County; Part of Fond du Lac County; Part of Outagamie County
Luther Olsen	Rep.		100th	2011–2012	Green Lake County and Most of Marquette County; Most of Waupaca County; Most of Waushara County; Northern Columbia County; Northeast Sauk County; Part of Adams County; Part of Fond du Lac County; Part of Outagamie County
Luther Olsen	Rep.		101st	2013–2014	Green Lake and Marquette counties and Most of Columbia County; Most of Waupaca County; Southern Adams County; Northeast Dodge County; Eastern Waushara County; Part of Dane County; Part of Fond du Lac County; Part of Outagamie County; Part of Sauk County
Luther Olsen	Rep.		102nd	2015–2016	Green Lake and Marquette counties and Most of Columbia County; Most of Waupaca County; Southern Adams County; Northeast Dodge County; Eastern Waushara County; Part of Dane County; Part of Fond du Lac County; Part of Outagamie County; Part of Sauk County
Luther Olsen	Rep.		103rd	2017–2018	Green Lake and Marquette counties and Most of Columbia County; Most of Waupaca County; Southern Adams County; Northeast Dodge County; Eastern Waushara County; Part of Dane County; Part of Fond du Lac County; Part of Outagamie County; Part of Sauk County
Luther Olsen	Rep.		104th	2019–2020	Green Lake and Marquette counties and Most of Columbia County; Most of Waupaca County; Southern Adams County; Northeast Dodge County; Eastern Waushara County; Part of Dane County; Part of Fond du Lac County; Part of Outagamie County; Part of Sauk County
Joan Ballweg	Rep.	Elected 2020.	105th	2021–2022	Green Lake and Marquette counties and Most of Columbia County; Most of Waupaca County; Southern Adams County; Northeast Dodge County; Eastern Waushara County; Part of Dane County; Part of Fond du Lac County; Part of Outagamie County; Part of Sauk County
Joan Ballweg	Rep.	Elected 2020.	106th	2023–2024	Green Lake & Marquette counties, southern Adams County, most of Columbia County, northwest Dodge County, part of Fond du Lac County, part of Outagamie County, part of Sauk County, most of Waupaca County, eastern Waushara County
Sarah Keyeski	Dem.	Elected 2024.	107th	2025–2026	Richland and Sauk counties and Most of Columbia County; Northern Dane County; Southern Adams County; Southern Juneau County; Part of Vernon County
