= John Scanlon =

American politician

John Scanlon (September 10, 1841 – December 6, 1895) was an American farmer from Symco, Wisconsin who spent one term as a Greenback Party member of the Wisconsin State Assembly from Waupaca County, Wisconsin.

== Background ==
Scanlon was born in Bunninadden, County Sligo, Ireland on September 10, 1841, the son of John Scanlon Sr. and Anna May. He received a common school education, and became a farmer. He came to Wisconsin in 1855, settled in Burnett, but moved to Waupaca County in 1856.

He enlisted in the 7th Wisconsin Volunteer Infantry Regiment on December 31, 1864, and participated in the Battle of White Oak Road and the Battle of Five Forks in 1865. He and his unit (part of the famed Iron Brigade) were involved in the pursuit and capture of Robert E. Lee's army, and took part in the Grand Review of the Armies at Washington on May 3, 1865. He was mustered out July 3, 1865, when the regiment returned to Madison from Kentucky and was discharged.

== Public office ==
He had held various local offices, including town treasurer and chairman of the town board of supervisors; and was a delegate to the Greenback state convention in 1877. He was elected to the assembly for 1879 from the 2nd Waupaca County district (the towns of Bear Creek, Dupont, Helvetia, Iola, Larrabee, Lebanon, Little Wolf, Matteson, Mukwa, Scandinavia, St. Lawrence and Union, and the first and second wards of New London), receiving 943 votes against 783 for Republican L. D. Moses (Republican incumbent Francis Guernsey was not a candidate). Scanlon was assigned to the standing committee on town and county organization.

He ran for re-election for 1880, and was defeated by Republican Nels Anderson, who drew 962 votes to 419 for Democratic former State Representative Michael Gorman and 345 for Scanlon.

== After the Assembly ==
He returned to farming in Symco, but spent some time as a messenger for the Superintendent of Public Instruction of Wisconsin office in Madison. He died in Manawa, Wisconsin in 1895.
