= Nels Anderson (politician) =

American politician

Nels Anderson (March 17, 1828 – February 22, 1887) was a member of the Wisconsin State Assembly.

Anderson was born in Kragerø, Norway. During the American Civil War, he was a first lieutenant with the 47th Wisconsin Volunteer Infantry Regiment of the Union Army. He later became a merchant in Scandinavia, Wisconsin. He was married to Birgit Anderson (1833–1879). They were the parents of nine children. He died in 1887 and was buried in the Scandinavian Lutheran Cemetery in Waupaca County, Wisconsin

== Assembly career ==
Anderson was a member of the Assembly during the 1880 session. He defeated the incumbent, John Scanlon, for election. Anderson was a Republican.
