= Wyoming, Wisconsin =

Wyoming is the name of some places in the U.S. state of Wisconsin:

- Wyoming, Iowa County, Wisconsin, a town
- Wyoming, Waupaca County, Wisconsin, a town
- Wyoming (community), Wisconsin, an unincorporated community
