= Senator Mack =

Senator Mack may refer to:

- Andrew Mack (politician) (1780–1854), Michigan State Senate
- Connie Mack III (born 1940), U.S. Senator from Florida
- Ebenezer Mack (1791–1849), New York State Senate
- Joseph Mack (politician) (1919–2005), Michigan State Senate
- Mike Mack (1873–1949), Wisconsin State Senate
- Tiara Mack (born 1993), Rhode Island State Senate
