= Granite City, Wisconsin =

- Ghost town
- Location within Wisconsin
- Coordinates: 44°38′02″N 88°59′28″W
- Country: United States
- State: Wisconsin
- County: Waupaca
- Elevation: 899 ft (274 m)
- GNIS feature ID: 1850462

Granite City is a ghost town in the town of Wyoming, Waupaca County, Wisconsin, United States. The settlement was located in section 13 of the town of Wyoming, and had formed before Wyoming was split from the larger town of Helvetia in 1890.

== History ==
Granite City formed around what was described as "a rich granite quarry" owned by J. H. Leuthold and (partner) Holman. The quarry and town was served by a four-mile spur of the Milwaukee, Lake Shore and Western Railroad, and the town featured a store.
