= Theodore Holtebeck =

American politician and businessman (1883-1963)

Theodore Holtebeck (June 4, 1883 – March 22, 1963) was an American politician and businessman.

Born in Norway, Holtebeck emigrated to the United States in 1896 and settled in Scandinavia, Wisconsin, in Waupaca County, Wisconsin, working a farm. From 1909 to 1934, Holtebeck operated a barber shop in West Bend, Wisconsin and then was in the insurance business. Holtebeck served on the West Bend Common Council from 1914 to 1924 and 1936. He also served as undersheriff of Washington County and sheriff of Washington County from 1929 to 1932. Holtebeck was a Republican. From 1945 to 1951, Holtebeck served in the Wisconsin State Assembly. Holtebeck died in West Bend, Wisconsin.
