= Theophilus Albert Willy =

American politician

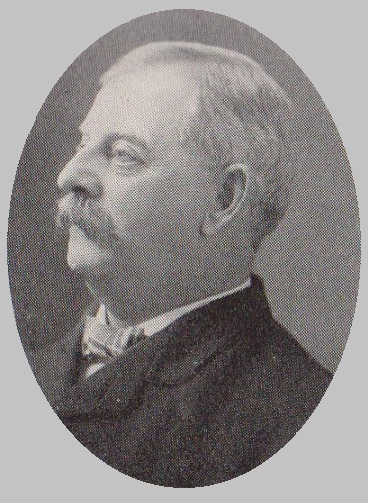

Member of the Wisconsin Senate from the 14th district
- In office 1901–1905

Wisconsin State Assembly
- In office 1899–1901

Personal details
- Born: April 16, 1845 Somersetshire, England
- Died: 1916 (aged 70–71)
- Party: Republican

Theophilus Albert Willy was a Republican member of the Wisconsin Legislature.

He was born on April 16, 1845, at Somersetshire, England, where he was educated. In 1866 he came to Appleton, Wisconsin, where he worked as a miller and buyer of grain for a few years. From 1870 to 1878 he was a manufacturer of staves (wooden parts for barrels) and lumber, and was also a dealer of merchandise. In 1878 he returned to his former occupation in the grain industry.

Willy was a member of the State Assembly from 1899 to 1901, and then served in the State Senate from 1901 to 1905.

He died in 1916.
