= Ambrose Stephen McDonald =

American politician and businessman

Ambrose Stephen McDonald (November 28, 1845 – April 14, 1913) was an American politician and businessman.

Born in Crown Point, Indiana, McDonald served in the 12th Indiana Infantry Regiment during the American Civil War. He graduated from the University of Notre Dame in 1867. In 1873, McDonald moved to Wisconsin and settled in Marion, Wisconsin. He was in the lumber and merchandise business. He served as chairman of the Dupont, Wisconsin Town Board from 1879 to 1881. McDonald served in the Wisconsin State Assembly from 1885 to 1889 and was a Republican. He died in Marion, Wisconsin.
