= Sugar Bush, Outagamie County, Wisconsin =

Sugar Bush, Wisconsin
- Unincorporated community
- Location within Wisconsin Location within the United States
- Coordinates: 44°28′54″N 88°44′9″W
- Country: United States
- State: Wisconsin
- County: Outagamie
- Elevation: 830 ft (250 m)
- Time zone: UTC-6 (Central (CST))
  - Summer (DST): UTC-5 (CDT)

Sugar Bush is an unincorporated community located entirely within the town of Maple Creek in northwestern Outagamie County, Wisconsin, United States. Sugar Bush is classified as a Class U6 Community by the USGS, being a populated place located wholly or substantially outside the boundaries of any incorporated place or CDP with a recognized authoritative common name.

Sugar Bush is located 6 miles (9.7 km) north of New London, 10 miles (16 km) south of Clintonville and 40 miles (64 km) west of Green Bay.

Postal service is provided by the New London post office, ZIP code 54961.

== History ==
The Sugar Bush post office operated from 1858 until 1972. The community was named from a grove of sugar maples near the town site.

== Geography ==
Sugar Bush is located at 44°28′54″N 88°44′9″W (44.4816467, -88.7359322), and the elevation is 830 feet (250 m).

== Education ==
The School District of New London operates an elementary school in Sugar Bush.

== Transportation ==
Sugar Bush is located on Outagamie County Highway WW, immediately east of U.S. Highway 45, a major north-south corridor in the State of Wisconsin, and just west of Outagamie County Highway D.
