= Little Wolf, Wisconsin =

- Town
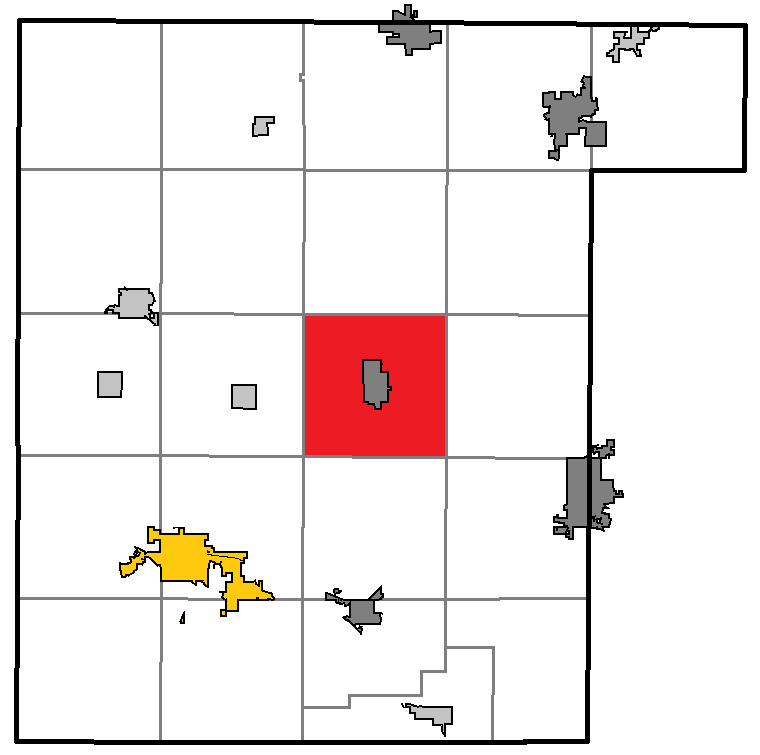
- Location of Little Wolf, within Waupaca County
- Coordinates: 44°26′52″N 88°54′44″W
- Country: United States
- State: Wisconsin
- County: Waupaca

Area
  - Total: 33.9 sq mi (87.9 km^{2})
  - Land: 33.5 sq mi (86.8 km^{2})
  - Water: 0.42 sq mi (1.1 km^{2})
- Elevation: 804 ft (245 m)

Population (2020)
  - Total: 1,400
  - Density: 42/sq mi (16/km^{2})
- Time zone: UTC-6 (Central (CST))
  - Summer (DST): UTC-5 (CDT)
- FIPS code: 55-45300
- GNIS feature ID: 1583587
- Website: https://townoflittlewolfwi.gov/

Little Wolf is a town in Waupaca County, Wisconsin, United States. The population was 1,400 at the 2020 census.

== History ==
The town was first settled by William Goldberg in 1848, who was joined by George E. and J.P. More in 1849, and James and Peter Meiklejohn in 1850. The first settlements straddled the river on the southern border of the township. The town was at first known as Centerville, and was organized on March 5, 1852. On November 15, 1854, the town changed its name to Little Wolf. After Jack Brickley built the first bridge across the river in 1858, it was also known as Brickley Bridge, but the name Little Wolf stuck after A. P. Jones established a new town post office in January 1859.

The Town of Royalton separated from Little Wolf in 1853. The towns Town of Union was separated from Little Wolf in 1857, with the Town of Dupont separating from the Town of Union in 1864.

The area grew fairly quickly in just ten years. Goldberg and the Mores built a sawmill there in 1849. Andrew Van Adestine fired up a smithy, Dan Smith and A. P. Jones opened groceries, and Jack Brickley bridged the river. Although Peter Meiklejohn set aside a room in his house for the village's first teacher, Miss Fortner, to use as a class room in 1853, the village raised a school house in 1857, the same year that Meikeljohn opened a grist mill on the southwest bank of the river. A two-story hotel, also operated by the Meiklejohns, stood near the grist mill.

Little Wolf never grew much bigger, though, and probably began to decline in the 1870s, after another lumbermill was built upriver in 1871, and the railroad was routed through Manawa in 1873. Until recently, the hotel and the foundations of the grist mill were all that remained to show that the village ever existed. Today, even the hotel is gone.

== Geography ==
According to the United States Census Bureau, the town has a total area of 34.0 square miles (87.9 km^{2}), of which 33.5 square miles (86.8 km^{2}) is land and 0.4 square mile (1.1 km^{2}) (1.27%) is water.

== Demographics ==
As of the census of 2000, there were 1,445 people, 511 households, and 414 families residing in the town. The population density was 43.1 people per square mile (16.6/km^{2}). There were 544 housing units at an average density of 16.2 per square mile (6.3/km^{2}). The racial makeup of the town was 98.89% White, 0.21% African American, 0.14% Native American, 0.07% Asian, 0.35% from other races, and 0.35% from two or more races. Hispanic or Latino of any race were 0.97% of the population.

There were 511 households, out of which 38.0% had children under the age of 18 living with them, 73.0% were married couples living together, 5.1% had a female householder with no husband present, and 18.8% were non-families. 15.5% of all households were made up of individuals, and 7.6% had someone living alone who was 65 years of age or older. The average household size was 2.83 and the average family size was 3.15.

In the town, the population was spread out, with 28.9% under the age of 18, 6.0% from 18 to 24, 30.4% from 25 to 44, 23.2% from 45 to 64, and 11.5% who were 65 years of age or older. The median age was 37 years. For every 100 females, there were 106.7 males. For every 100 females age 18 and over, there were 107.5 males.

The median income for a household in the town was $47,692, and the median income for a family was $52,344. Males had a median income of $33,693 versus $22,399 for females. The per capita income for the town was $17,692. About 5.1% of families and 7.5% of the population were below the poverty line, including 10.1% of those under age 18 and 5.9% of those age 65 or over.
