= Hunting, Wisconsin =

Hunting
- Unincorporated community
- Location within the state of Wisconsin Hunting (the United States)
- Coordinates: 44°40′44″N 88°40′58″W
- Country: United States
- State: Wisconsin
- County: Shawano and Waupaca
- Time zone: UTC-6 (Central (CST))
  - Summer (DST): UTC-5 (CDT)

Hunting is a former unincorporated community of Shawano and Waupaca counties, located in the towns of Belle Plaine and Matteson, along the north shore of the Embarrass River, United States. Today little more remains of the community than the name of the road that traverses it: "Hunting Road."

== History ==
A post office called Hunting was established in 1880, and remained in operation until it was discontinued in 1934. The community may have been named either in honor of a landowner named Hunting, or from the fact the area was a hunting ground, or both.
