= Maple Creek, Wisconsin =

- Town
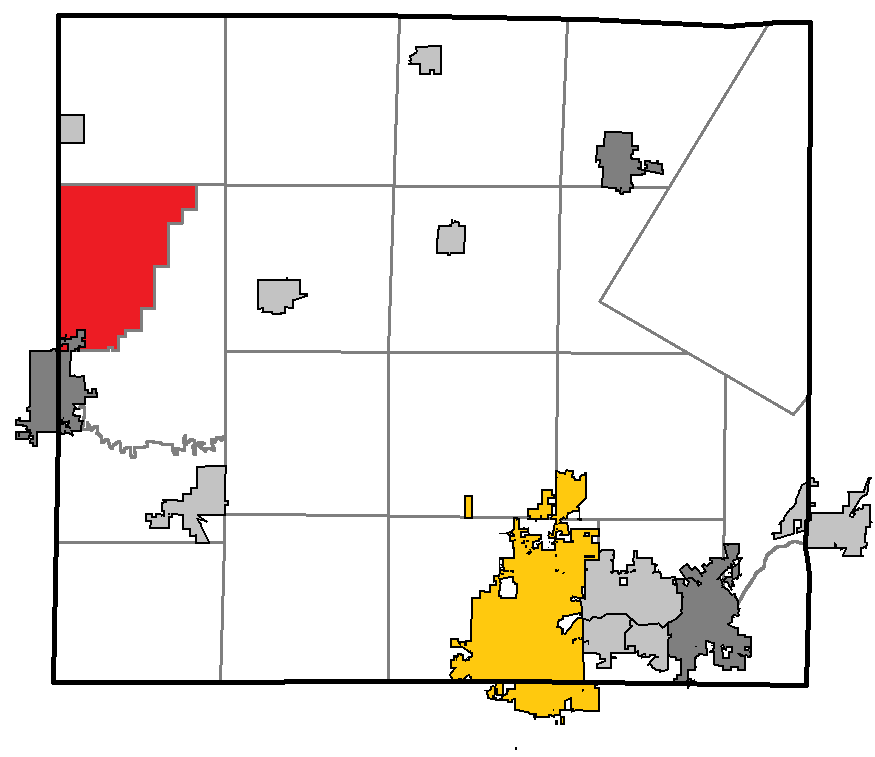
- Location of Maple Creek, within Outagamie County
- Coordinates: 44°27′46″N 88°41′47″W
- Country: United States
- State: Wisconsin
- County: Outagamie

Area
  - Total: 21.7 sq mi (56.2 km^{2})
  - Land: 21.6 sq mi (55.9 km^{2})
  - Water: 0.12 sq mi (0.3 km^{2})
- Elevation: 771 ft (235 m)

Population (2020)
  - Total: 591
  - Density: 27.4/sq mi (10.6/km^{2})
- Time zone: UTC-6 (Central (CST))
  - Summer (DST): UTC-5 (CDT)
- FIPS code: 55-48775
- GNIS feature ID: 1583641
- Website: http://www.townofmaplecreek.com/

Maple Creek is a town in Outagamie County, Wisconsin, United States. The population was 591 at the 2020 census. The unincorporated community of Sugar Bush is located in the town.

== Geography ==
According to the United States Census Bureau, the town has a total area of 21.7 square miles (56.2 km^{2}), of which 21.6 square miles (55.9 km^{2}) is land and 0.1 square mile (0.3 km^{2}) (0.60%) is water.

== Demographics ==
=== 2020 census ===
As of the census of 2020, there were 591 people, 249 housing units, and 182 total households residing in the town. The population density was 27.2 people per square mile (10.6/km^{2}). The racial makeup of the town was 94.92% White, 0.34% from Black or African American, 1.35% from other races, and 3.04% from two or more races. Hispanic or Latino of any race were 2.03% of the population.

=== 2000 census ===
According to the 2000 Census, there were 182 households, out of which 38.9% had children under the age of 18 living with them, 69.2% were married couples living together, 7.3% had a female householder with no husband present, and 19.7% were non-families. 13.2% of all households were made up of individuals, and 6.8% had someone living alone who was 65 years of age or older. The average household size was 2.94 and the average family size was 3.27.

According to the 2000 Census, in the town, the population was spread out, with 29.3% under the age of 18, 7.4% from 18 to 24, 29.5% from 25 to 44, 22.7% from 45 to 64, and 11.1% who were 65 years of age or older. The median age was 35 years. For every 100 females, there were 110.7 males. For every 100 females age 18 and over, there were 98.4 males.

The median income for a household according to the 2000 Census in the town was $43,472, and the median income for a family was $50,781. Males had a median income of $35,083 versus $23,295 for females. The per capita income for the town was $16,602. About 4.0% of families and 3.9% of the population were below the poverty line, including 3.3% of those under age 18 and 10.3% of those age 65 or over.
