= Mike Mack =

American politician

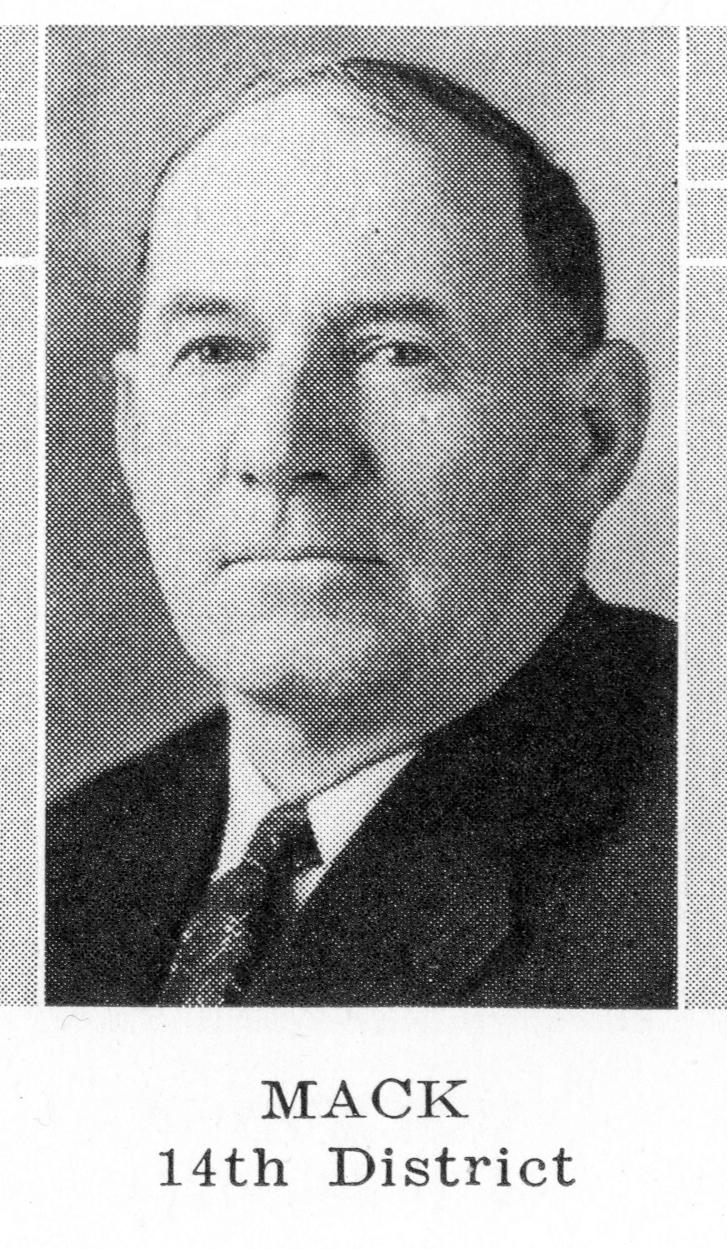
Mike Mack

Mike Mack (November 15, 1873–August 12, 1949) was a member of the Wisconsin State Senate.

== Biography ==
Michael Mack was born on November 15, 1873, in Trempealeau County, Wisconsin. He later resided in Shiocton, Wisconsin.

Mack was a farmer in Outagamie County for 40 years. His wife was Getrude Bell "Gertie" DeLong. They were married February 12, 1898, in Shiocton, Outagamie County, Wisconsin.

Mack died on August 12, 1949, at age 75, at Wisconsin General Hospital.

== Political career ==
Mack was a member of the Senate representing the 14th District, then consisting of Outagamie and Shawano counties, from 1933 to 1942. He left the Senate to accept an appointment by Governor Julius P. Heil to the Wisconsin Highway Commission. Mack served as chairman of the Commission for a time, and Governor Oscar Rennebohm reappointed him to the Commission for a term expiring in 1953.

Additionally, he was a member of the Outagamie County Board. He was a Republican.
