= Wyoming, Waupaca County, Wisconsin =

Wyoming, Wisconsin
- Town
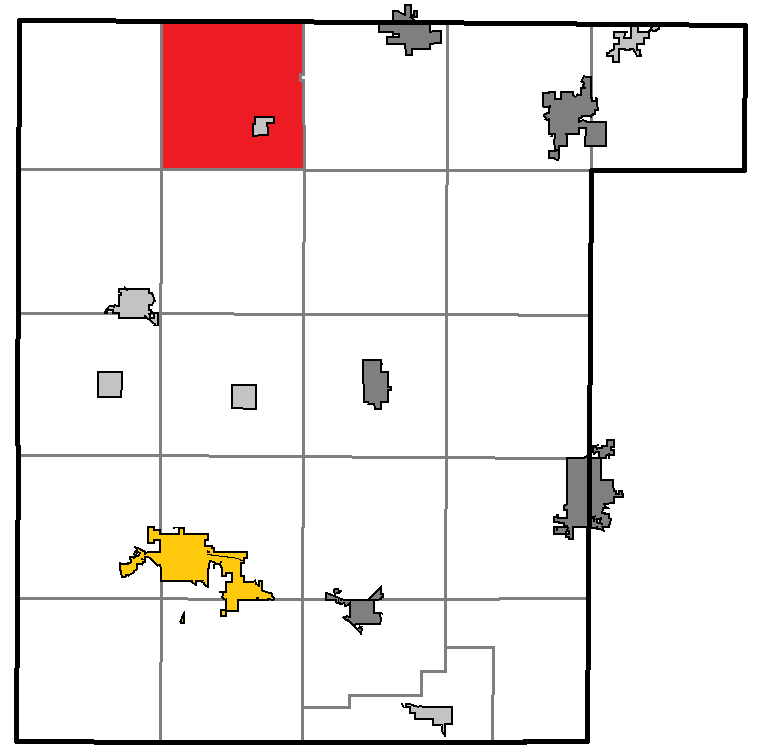
- Location of Wyoming, within Waupaca County, Wisconsin
- Coordinates: 44°38′2″N 89°2′9″W
- Country: United States
- State: Wisconsin
- County: Waupaca

Area
  - Total: 36.2 sq mi (93.8 km^{2})
  - Land: 36.1 sq mi (93.6 km^{2})
  - Water: 0.077 sq mi (0.2 km^{2})
- Elevation: 932 ft (284 m)

Population (2020)
  - Total: 318
  - Density: 8.80/sq mi (3.40/km^{2})
- Time zone: UTC-6 (Central (CST))
  - Summer (DST): UTC-5 (CDT)
- FIPS code: 55-89375
- GNIS feature ID: 1584491
- Website: https://www.townofwyomingwi.com/

Wyoming is a town in Waupaca County, Wisconsin, United States. The population was 318 at the 2020 census. The ghost town of Granite City was located in the town.

== Geography ==
According to the United States Census Bureau, the town has a total area of 36.2 square miles (93.8 km^{2}), of which 36.1 square miles (93.6 km^{2}) is land and 0.1 square mile (0.2 km^{2}) (0.19%) is water.

== Demographics ==
As of the census of 2000, there were 285 people, 111 households, and 81 families residing in the town. The population density was 7.9 people per square mile (3.0/km^{2}). There were 151 housing units at an average density of 4.2 per square mile (1.6/km^{2}). The racial makeup of the town was 98.60% White, 0.70% Native American, and 0.70% from two or more races.

There were 111 households, out of which 27.9% had children under the age of 18 living with them, 67.6% were married couples living together, 2.7% had a female householder with no husband present, and 27.0% were non-families. 21.6% of all households were made up of individuals, and 10.8% had someone living alone who was 65 years of age or older. The average household size was 2.57 and the average family size was 3.02.

In the town, the population was spread out, with 22.5% under the age of 18, 6.7% from 18 to 24, 29.8% from 25 to 44, 27.4% from 45 to 64, and 13.7% who were 65 years of age or older. The median age was 40 years. For every 100 females, there were 122.7 males. For every 100 females age 18 and over, there were 116.7 males.

The median income for a household in the town was $41,429, and the median income for a family was $45,938. Males had a median income of $31,250 versus $23,036 for females. The per capita income for the town was $17,618. About 2.3% of families and 3.5% of the population were below the poverty line, including none of those under the age of eighteen and 4.1% of those 65 or over.

== See also ==
- List of towns in Wisconsin
