= St. Lawrence, Wisconsin =

- Town
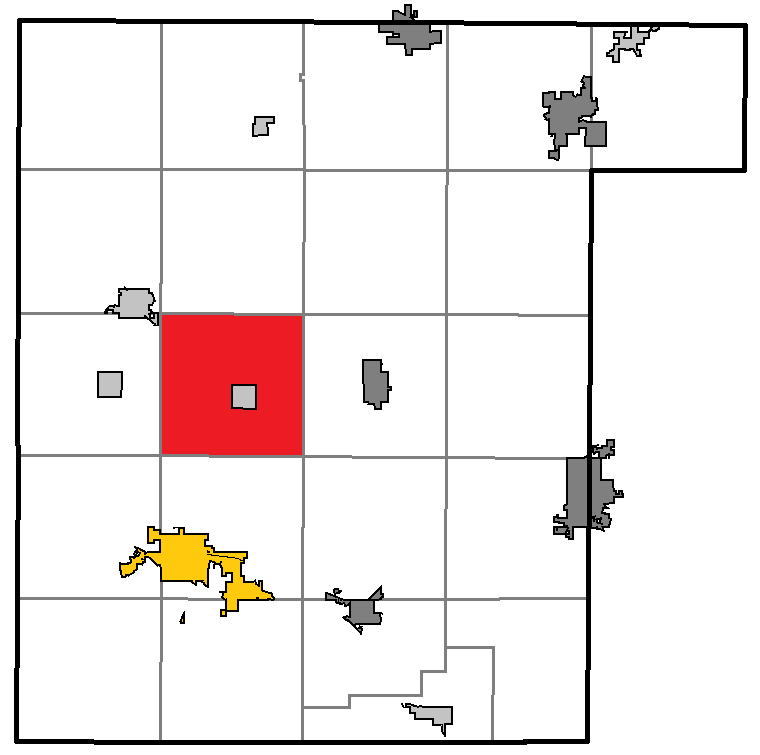
- Location of St. Lawrence, within Waupaca County
- Coordinates: 44°27′15″N 89°3′10″W
- Country: United States
- State: Wisconsin
- County: Waupaca

Area
  - Total: 35.0 sq mi (90.6 km^{2})
  - Land: 34.7 sq mi (89.9 km^{2})
  - Water: 0.27 sq mi (0.7 km^{2})
- Elevation: 860 ft (262 m)

Population (2020)
  - Total: 714
  - Density: 20.6/sq mi (7.94/km^{2})
- Time zone: UTC-6 (Central (CST))
  - Summer (DST): UTC-5 (CDT)
- FIPS code: 55-70900
- GNIS feature ID: 1584090
- Website: http://townofstlawrence.net/

St. Lawrence is a town in Waupaca County, Wisconsin, United States. The population was 714 at the 2020 census. The ghost town of Granite Quarry was located partially in the town.

== Geography ==
According to the United States Census Bureau, the town has a total area of 35.0 square miles (90.6 km^{2}), of which 34.7 square miles (89.9 km^{2}) is land and 0.3 square mile (0.7 km^{2}) (0.80%) is water.

== Demographics ==
At the 2000 census there were 740 people, 284 households, and 216 families in the town. The population density was 21.3 people per square mile (8.2/km^{2}). There were 345 housing units at an average density of 9.9 per square mile (3.8/km^{2}). The racial makeup of the town was 98.65% White, 0.54% Native American, 0.14% Asian, 0.14% from other races, and 0.54% from two or more races. Hispanic or Latino of any race were 1.22%.

Of the 284 households 31.3% had children under the age of 18 living with them, 65.1% were married couples living together, 5.6% had a female householder with no husband present, and 23.9% were non-families. 21.5% of households were one person and 8.1% were one person aged 65 or older. The average household size was 2.61 and the average family size was 2.98.

The age distribution was 25.4% under the age of 18, 8.4% from 18 to 24, 23.8% from 25 to 44, 28.6% from 45 to 64, and 13.8% 65 or older. The median age was 41 years. For every 100 females, there were 110.8 males. For every 100 females age 18 and over, there were 114.0 males.

The median household income was $44,286 and the median family income was $52,788. Males had a median income of $32,250 versus $26,528 for females. The per capita income for the town was $20,160. About 2.8% of families and 4.0% of the population were below the poverty line, including 1.1% of those under age 18 and 11.5% of those age 65 or over.
