= Scandinavia, Wisconsin =

- Village
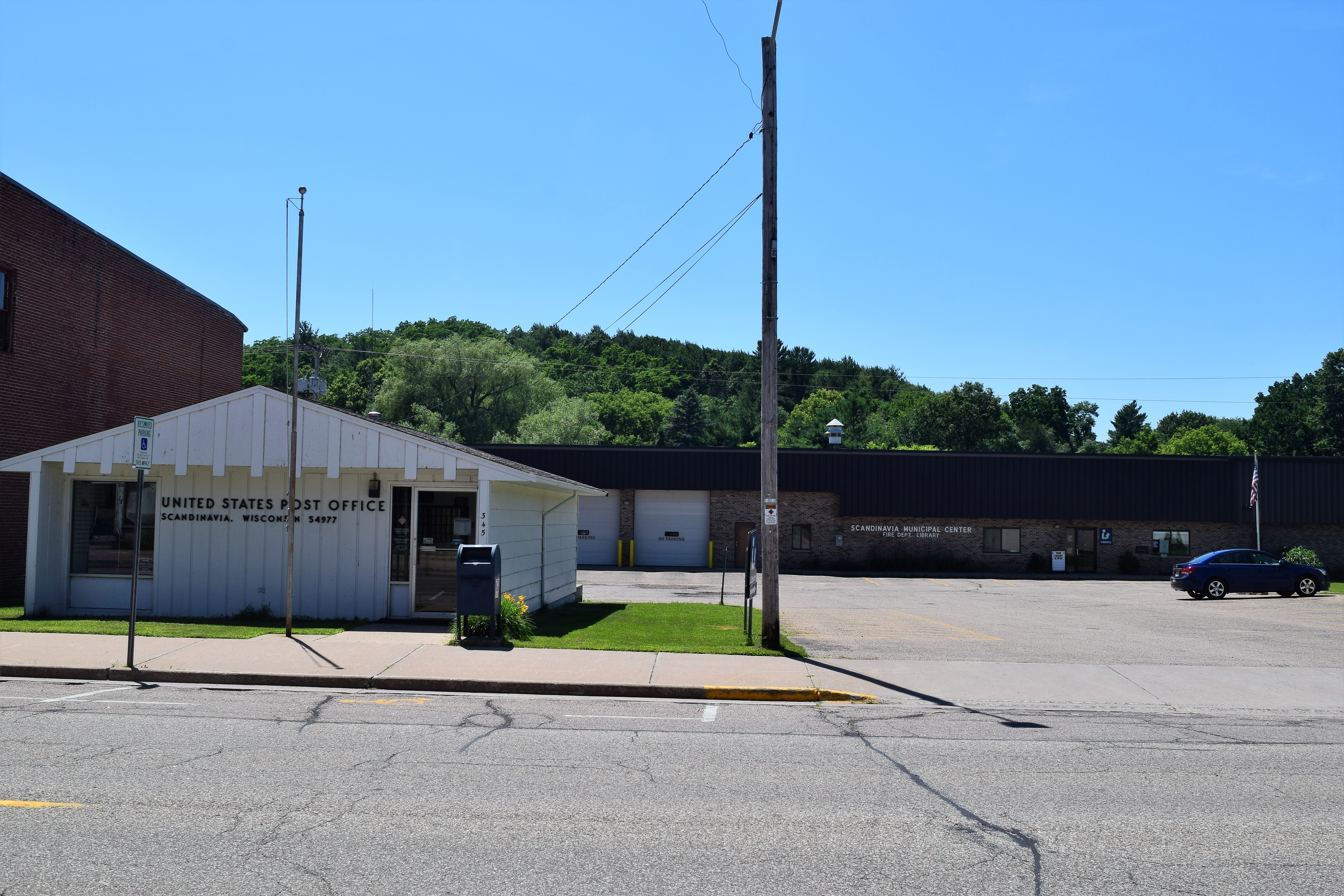
- Scandinavia post office and municipal center

- Location of Scandinavia in Waupaca County, Wisconsin.
- Coordinates: 44°28′16″N 89°9′21″W
- Country: United States
- State: Wisconsin
- County: Waupaca
- Settled: 1850

Area
  - Total: 1.01 sq mi (2.61 km^{2})
  - Land: 0.87 sq mi (2.26 km^{2})
  - Water: 0.14 sq mi (0.35 km^{2})
- Elevation: 961 ft (293 m)

Population (2020)
  - Total: 371
  - Density: 425/sq mi (164/km^{2})
- Time zone: UTC-6 (Central (CST))
  - Summer (DST): UTC-5 (CDT)
- Area codes: 715 & 534
- FIPS code: 55-72000
- GNIS feature ID: 1573767
- Website: https://villageofscandinavia.com/

Scandinavia is a village in the Town of Scandinavia in Waupaca County, Wisconsin, United States. The population was 371 at the 2020 census.

== Geography ==
Scandinavia is located at 44°27′41″N 89°8′55″W (44.461513, -89.148659).

According to the United States Census Bureau, the village has a total area of 1.01 square miles (2.62 km^{2}), of which 0.88 square miles (2.28 km^{2}) is land and 0.13 square miles (0.34 km^{2}) is water.

== Demographics ==
Historical population
Census	Pop.	Note	%±
1880	94		—
1900	320		—
1910	355		10.9%
1920	373		5.1%
1930	350		−6.2%
1940	295		−15.7%
1950	286		−3.1%
1960	266		−7.0%
1970	268		0.8%
1980	292		9.0%
1990	298		2.1%
2000	349		17.1%
2010	363		4.0%
2020	371		2.2%
U.S. Decennial Census

=== 2010 census ===
As of the census of 2010, there were 363 people, 147 households, and 97 families living in the village. The population density was 412.5 inhabitants per square mile (159.3/km^{2}). There were 166 housing units at an average density of 188.6 per square mile (72.8/km^{2}). The racial makeup of the village was 97.2% White, 0.6% African American, 0.3% Native American, 1.7% from other races, and 0.3% from two or more races. Hispanic or Latino of any race were 2.2% of the population.

There were 147 households, of which 32.7% had children under the age of 18 living with them, 47.6% were married couples living together, 13.6% had a female householder with no husband present, 4.8% had a male householder with no wife present, and 34.0% were non-families. 27.2% of all households were made up of individuals, and 13.6% had someone living alone who was 65 years of age or older. The average household size was 2.47 and the average family size was 2.97.

The median age in the village was 36.5 years. 25.6% of residents were under the age of 18; 8% were between the ages of 18 and 24; 27.4% were from 25 to 44; 25.9% were from 45 to 64; and 13.2% were 65 years of age or older. The gender makeup of the village was 49.0% male and 51.0% female.

=== 2000 census ===
As of the census of 2000, there were 349 people, 137 households, and 90 families living in the village. The population density was 404.8 people per square mile (156.7/km^{2}). There were 152 housing units at an average density of 176.3 per square mile (68.2/km^{2}). The racial makeup of the village was 98.57% White, 0.29% Black or African American and 1.15% Native American. 0.00% of the population were Hispanic or Latino of any race.

There were 137 households, out of which 35.0% had children under the age of 18 living with them, 56.2% were married couples living together, 8.0% had a female householder with no husband present, and 33.6% were non-families. 29.2% of all households were made up of individuals, and 16.1% had someone living alone who was 65 years of age or older. The average household size was 2.55 and the average family size was 3.16.

In the village, the population was spread out, with 29.5% under the age of 18, 6.0% from 18 to 24, 32.4% from 25 to 44, 17.8% from 45 to 64, and 14.3% who were 65 years of age or older. The median age was 35 years. For every 100 females, there were 96.1 males. For every 100 females age 18 and over, there were 92.2 males.

The median income for a household in the village was $42,500, and the median income for a family was $48,125. Males had a median income of $36,339 versus $19,821 for females. The per capita income for the village was $15,730. About 10.1% of families and 9.1% of the population were below the poverty line, including 6.1% of those under age 18 and 24.5% of those age 65 or over.

== Notable people ==
- Theodore Holtebeck, Wisconsin State Representative and businessman, lived in Scandinavia before moving to West Bend, Wisconsin.
- Jonas Swenholt, Wisconsin State Representative and businessman, lived in Scandivania.
- John Voldstad, actor, best known for playing "my other brother Darryl" on the comedy series Newhart.
