= Matteson, Wisconsin =

- Town
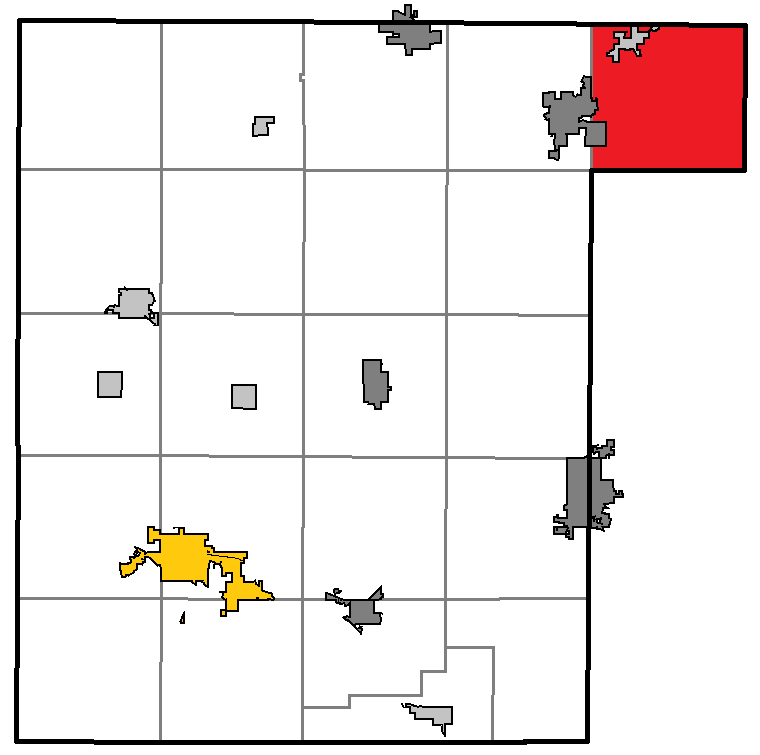
- Location of Matteson, within Waupaca County
- Coordinates: 44°38′N 88°40′W
- Country: United States
- State: Wisconsin
- County: Waupaca

Area
  - Total: 37.1 sq mi (96.2 km^{2})
  - Land: 36.7 sq mi (95.0 km^{2})
  - Water: 0.46 sq mi (1.2 km^{2})
- Elevation: 801 ft (244 m)

Population (2020)
  - Total: 914
  - Density: 24.9/sq mi (9.62/km^{2})
- Time zone: UTC-6 (Central (CST))
  - Summer (DST): UTC-5 (CDT)
- FIPS code: 55-49975
- GNIS feature ID: 1583671
- Website: https://www.townofmatteson.com/

Matteson is a town in Waupaca County, Wisconsin, United States. The population was 914 at the 2020 census. The former unincorporated community of Hunting was located partially in the town.

== Geography ==
According to the United States Census Bureau, the town has a total area of 37.1 square miles (96.2 km^{2}), of which 36.7 square miles (94.9 km^{2}) is land and 0.5 square mile (1.2 km^{2}) (1.27%) is water.

== Demographics ==
As of the census of 2000, there were 956 people, 346 households, and 269 families residing in the town. The population density was 26.1 people per square mile (10.1/km^{2}). There were 390 housing units at an average density of 10.6 per square mile (4.1/km^{2}). The racial makeup of the town was 96.76% White, 1.05% Native American, 0.52% Asian, 0.84% from other races, and 0.84% from two or more races. Hispanic or Latino of any race were 1.78% of the population.

There were 346 households, out of which 38.4% had children under the age of 18 living with them, 67.6% were married couples living together, 5.5% had a female householder with no husband present, and 22.0% were non-families. 17.3% of all households were made up of individuals, and 7.8% had someone living alone who was 65 years of age or older. The average household size was 2.76 and the average family size was 3.09.

In the town, the population was spread out, with 28.9% under the age of 18, 6.3% from 18 to 24, 30.3% from 25 to 44, 25.0% from 45 to 64, and 9.5% who were 65 years of age or older. The median age was 38 years. For every 100 females, there were 99.6 males. For every 100 females age 18 and over, there were 100.0 males.

The median income for a household in the town was $43,088, and the median income for a family was $47,583. Males had a median income of $34,375 versus $18,500 for females. The per capita income for the town was $15,795. About 2.8% of families and 4.1% of the population were below the poverty line, including 5.5% of those under age 18 and none of those age 65 or over.
