= Lebanon, Waupaca County, Wisconsin =

Lebanon, Wisconsin
- Town
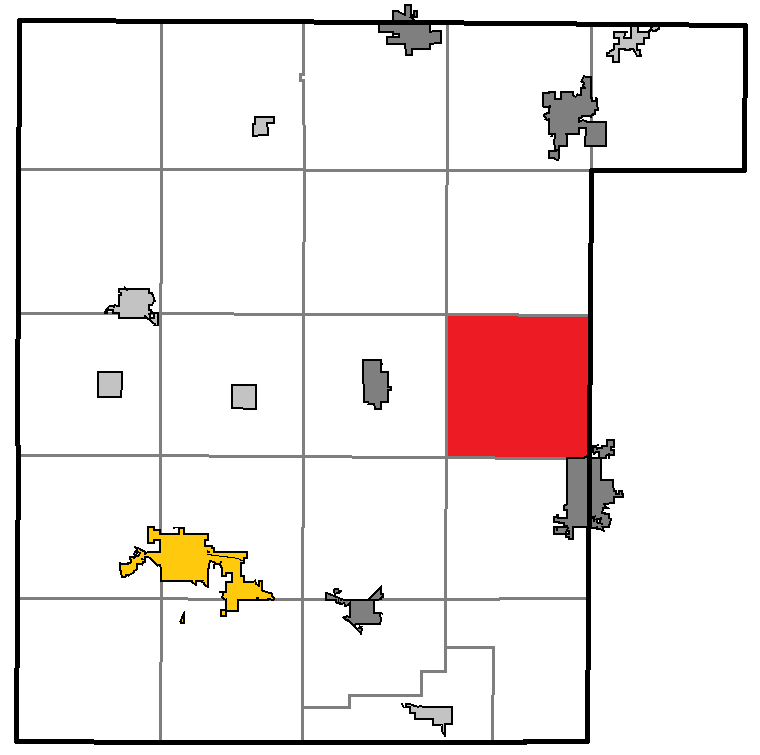
- Location of Lebanon, within Waupaca County Map
- Coordinates: 44°27′37″N 88°48′1″W
- Country: United States
- State: Wisconsin
- County: Waupaca

Area
  - Total: 36.1 sq mi (93.4 km^{2})
  - Land: 36.1 sq mi (93.4 km^{2})
  - Water: 0.039 sq mi (0.1 km^{2})
- Elevation: 810 ft (247 m)

Population (2020)
  - Total: 1,619
  - Density: 44.9/sq mi (17.3/km^{2})
- Time zone: UTC-6 (Central (CST))
  - Summer (DST): UTC-5 (CDT)
- FIPS code: 55-43075
- GNIS feature ID: 1583537
- Website: https://townoflebanon.wi.gov/

Lebanon is a town in Waupaca County, Wisconsin, United States. The population was 1,619 at the 2020 census. The unincorporated community of Carmel is located in the town. The ghost town of Nowell was also located in the town.

== Geography ==
According to the United States Census Bureau, the town has a total area of 36.1 square miles (93.4 km^{2}), of which 36.0 square miles (93.4 km^{2}) is land and 0.04 square mile (0.1 km^{2}) (0.08%) is water.

== Demographics ==
As of the census of 2000, there were 1,648 people, 573 households, and 456 families residing in the town. The population density was 45.7 people per square mile (17.7/km^{2}). There were 587 housing units at an average density of 16.3 per square mile (6.3/km^{2}). The racial makeup of the town was 98.60% White, 0.06% African American, 0.42% Native American, 0.06% Asian, 0.61% from other races, and 0.24% from two or more races. Hispanic or Latino of any race were 0.79% of the population.

There were 573 households, out of which 41.5% had children under the age of 18 living with them, 71.7% were married couples living together, 4.0% had a female householder with no husband present, and 20.4% were non-families. 16.9% of all households were made up of individuals, and 6.1% had someone living alone who was 65 years of age or older. The average household size was 2.88 and the average family size was 3.25.

In the town, the population was spread out, with 29.9% under the age of 18, 6.7% from 18 to 24, 32.2% from 25 to 44, 22.5% from 45 to 64, and 8.9% who were 65 years of age or older. The median age was 36 years. For every 100 females, there were 110.2 males. For every 100 females age 18 and over, there were 112.1 males.

The median income for a household in the town was $47,931, and the median income for a family was $51,053. Males had a median income of $35,428 versus $25,764 for females. The per capita income for the town was $18,948. About 3.2% of families and 4.2% of the population were below the poverty line, including 4.6% of those under age 18 and 7.7% of those age 65 or over.
