= Scandinavia (town), Wisconsin =

Scandinavia
- Town
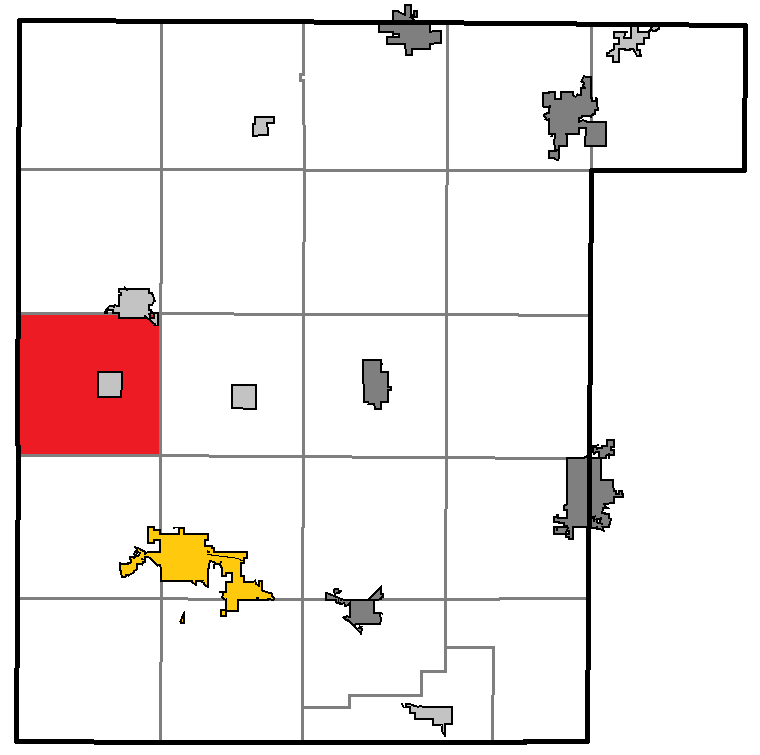
- Location of Scandinavia, within Waupaca County

- Location within the state of Wisconsin
- Coordinates: 44°27′44″N 89°8′50″W
- Country: United States
- State: Wisconsin
- County: Waupaca

Area
  - Total: 34.2 sq mi (88.7 km^{2})
  - Land: 33.8 sq mi (87.5 km^{2})
  - Water: 0.46 sq mi (1.2 km^{2})

Population (2020)
  - Total: 1,049
  - Density: 31.1/sq mi (12.0/km^{2})
- Time zone: UTC-6 (Central (CST))
  - Summer (DST): UTC-5 (CDT)
- Area codes: 715 & 534

Scandinavia is a town in Waupaca County, Wisconsin, United States. The population was 1,049 at the 2020 census. The Village of Scandinavia is located within the town.

== Geography ==
According to the United States Census Bureau, the town has a total area of 34.2 square miles (88.7 km^{2}), of which 33.8 square miles (87.5 km^{2}) is land and 0.4 square mile (1.2 km^{2}) (1.31%) is water.

== Demographics ==
As of the census of 2000, there were 1,075 people, 394 households, and 312 families residing in the town. The population density was 31.8 people per square mile (12.3/km^{2}). There were 479 housing units at an average density of 14.2 per square mile (5.5/km^{2}). The racial makeup of the town was 98.14% White, 0.19% Native American, 0.28% Asian, 0.09% Pacific Islander, 0.09% from other races, and 1.21% from two or more races. 0.47% of the population were Hispanic or Latino of any race.

There were 394 households, out of which 35.5% had children under the age of 18 living with them, 70.3% were married couples living together, 5.3% had a female householder with no husband present, and 20.6% were non-families. 15.0% of all households were made up of individuals, and 5.3% had someone living alone who was 65 years of age or older. The average household size was 2.72 and the average family size was 3.02.

In the town, the population was spread out, with 26.0% under the age of 18, 5.1% from 18 to 24, 26.6% from 25 to 44, 29.7% from 45 to 64, and 12.6% who were 65 years of age or older. The median age was 40 years. For every 100 females, there were 109.1 males. For every 100 females age 18 and over, there were 106.0 males.

The median income for a household in the town was $50,882, and the median income for a family was $54,861. Males had a median income of $44,271 versus $21,288 for females. The per capita income for the town was $20,166. About 1.6% of families and 3.1% of the population were below the poverty line, including none of those under age 18 and 9.7% of those age 65 or over.
