= Helvetia, Wisconsin =

- Town
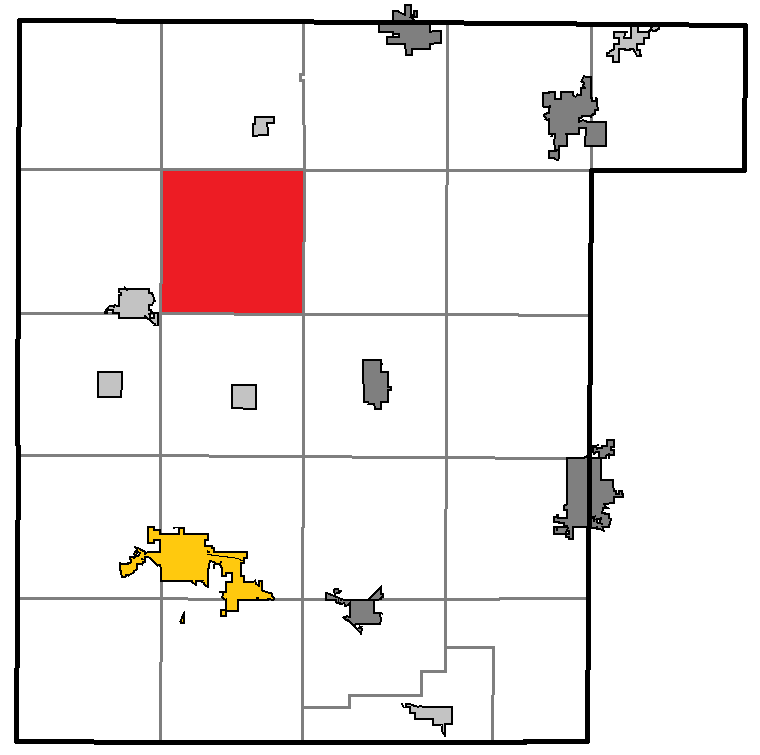
- Location of Helvetia, within Waupaca County
- Coordinates: 44°32′40″N 89°2′12″W
- Country: United States
- State: Wisconsin
- County: Waupaca

Area
  - Total: 36.2 sq mi (93.8 km^{2})
  - Land: 35.9 sq mi (93.1 km^{2})
  - Water: 0.31 sq mi (0.8 km^{2})
- Elevation: 879 ft (268 m)

Population (2020)
  - Total: 701
  - Density: 19.5/sq mi (7.53/km^{2})
- Time zone: UTC-6 (Central (CST))
  - Summer (DST): UTC-5 (CDT)
- FIPS code: 55-33850
- GNIS feature ID: 1583376
- Website: http://townofhelvetia.com/

Helvetia is a town in Waupaca County, Wisconsin, United States. As of the 2020 census, the town population was 701.

== Geography ==
According to the United States Census Bureau, the town has a total area of 36.2 square miles (93.8 km^{2}), of which 35.9 square miles (93.1 km^{2}) is land and 0.3 square mile (0.8 km^{2}) (0.80%) is water.

== Demographics ==
As of the census of 2000, there were 649 people, 271 households, and 198 families residing in the town. The population density was 18.1 people per square mile (7.0/km^{2}). There were 362 housing units at an average density of 10.1 per square mile (3.9/km^{2}). The racial makeup of the town was 99.38% White, 0.15% African American, 0.15% Asian, and 0.31% from two or more races. Hispanic or Latino of any race were 0.31% of the population.

There were 271 households, out of which 28.0% had children under the age of 18 living with them, 60.5% were married couples living together, 8.1% had a female householder with no husband present, and 26.6% were non-families. 22.9% of all households were made up of individuals, and 7.4% had someone living alone who was 65 years of age or older. The average household size was 2.39 and the average family size was 2.81.

In the town, the population was spread out, with 23.9% under the age of 18, 5.7% from 18 to 24, 25.6% from 25 to 44, 30.4% from 45 to 64, and 14.5% who were 65 years of age or older. The median age was 42 years. For every 100 females, there were 108.7 males. For every 100 females age 18 and over, there were 111.1 males.

The median income for a household in the town was $40,104, and the median income for a family was $48,125. Males had a median income of $32,417 versus $21,602 for females. The per capita income for the town was $19,229. About 3.3% of families and 5.7% of the population were below the poverty line, including 7.8% of those under age 18 and 4.8% of those age 65 or over.
