= Dupont, Wisconsin =

- Town
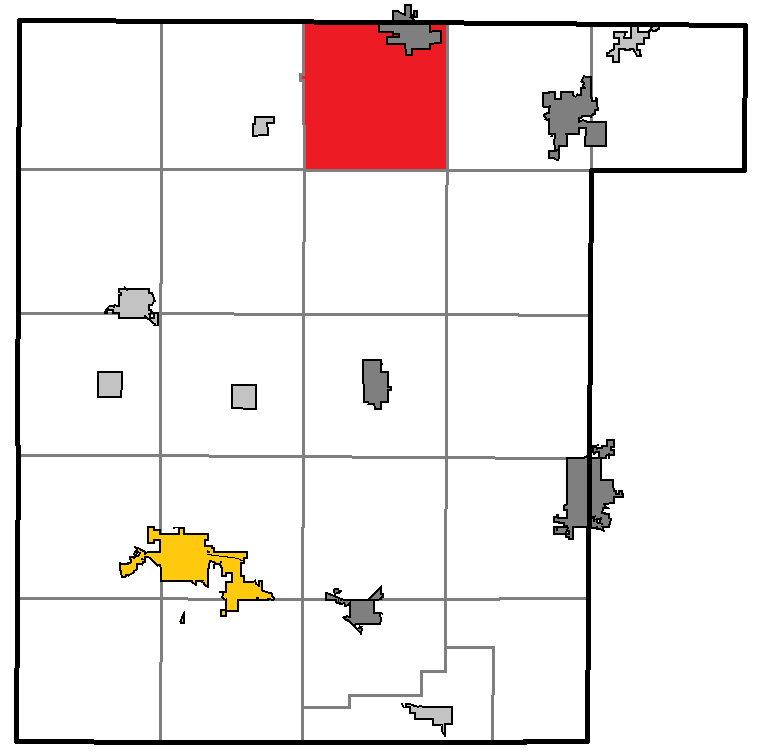
- Location of Dupont, within Waupaca County Map
- Coordinates: 44°38′37″N 88°55′14″W
- Country: United States
- State: Wisconsin
- County: Waupaca

Area
  - Total: 35.1 sq mi (90.8 km^{2})
  - Land: 34.7 sq mi (90.0 km^{2})
  - Water: 0.35 sq mi (0.9 km^{2})
- Elevation: 902 ft (275 m)

Population (2020)
  - Total: 746
  - Density: 21.5/sq mi (8.29/km^{2})
- Time zone: UTC-6 (Central (CST))
  - Summer (DST): UTC-5 (CDT)
- FIPS code: 55-21200
- GNIS feature ID: 1583107
- Website: http://www.townofdupont.org/home

Dupont is a town in Waupaca County, Wisconsin, United States. The population was 746 at the 2020 census.

== Geography ==
According to the United States Census Bureau, the town has a total area of 35.1 square miles (90.8 km^{2}), of which 34.7 square miles (90.0 km^{2}) is land and 0.3 square mile (0.9 km^{2}) (0.97%) is water.

== Demographics ==
As of the 2002 census, there were 741 people, 233 households, and 181 families residing in the town. The population density was 21.3 people per square mile (8.2/km^{2}). There were 257 housing units at an average density of 7.4 per square mile (2.9/km^{2}). The racial makeup of the town was 97.71% White, 1.62% Asian, 0.13% Native American, and 0.54% from two or more races.

There were 233 households, out of which 40.3% had children under the age of 18 living with them, 67.0% were married couples living together, 5.6% had a female householder with no husband present, and 22.3% were non-families. 21.0% of all households were made up of individuals, and 7.7% had someone living alone who was 65 years of age or older. The average household size was 3.18 and the average family size was 3.73.

In the town, the population was spread out, with 33.7% under the age of 18, 6.9% from 18 to 24, 27.8% from 25 to 44, 21.1% from 45 to 64, and 10.5% who were 65 years of age or older. The median age was 34 years. For every 100 females, there were 106.4 males. For every 100 females age 18 and over, there were 117.3 males.

The median income for a household in the town was $33,854, and the median income for a family was $38,750. Males had a median income of $26,625 versus $19,375 for females. The per capita income for the town was $13,108. About 4.0% of families and 7.2% of the population were below the poverty line, including 12.0% of those under age 18 and none of those age 65 or over.

== Notable people ==
- Ambrose Stephen McDonald, Wisconsin politician and businessman, lived in the town; McDonald served as chairman of the Dupont Town Board
