= Union, Waupaca County, Wisconsin =

Union, Wisconsin
- Town
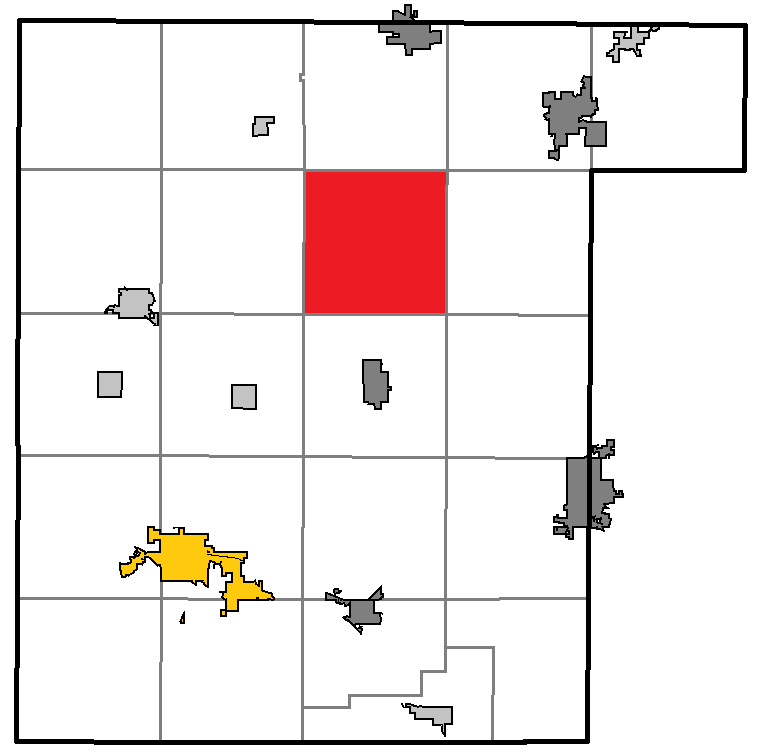
- Location of Union, within Waupaca County, Wisconsin
- Coordinates: 44°32′21″N 88°54′55″W
- Country: United States
- State: Wisconsin
- County: Waupaca

Area
  - Total: 36.1 sq mi (93.6 km^{2})
  - Land: 35.9 sq mi (93.0 km^{2})
  - Water: 0.23 sq mi (0.6 km^{2})
- Elevation: 869 ft (265 m)

Population (2020)
  - Total: 778
  - Density: 21.7/sq mi (8.37/km^{2})
- Time zone: UTC-6 (Central (CST))
  - Summer (DST): UTC-5 (CDT)
- FIPS code: 55-81700
- GNIS feature ID: 1584315
- Website: https://townofunionwaupacacounty.com/

Union is a town in Waupaca County, Wisconsin, United States. The population was 778 at the 2020 census. The unincorporated community of Symco is located in the town. The ghost town of Marble was also located in the town.

== Geography ==
According to the United States Census Bureau, the town has a total area of 36.1 square miles (93.6 km^{2}), of which 35.9 square miles (93.0 km^{2}) is land and 0.2 square mile (0.6 km^{2}) (0.61%) is water.

== Demographics ==
As of the census of 2000, there were 804 people, 291 households, and 233 families residing in the town. The population density was 22.4 people per square mile (8.6/km^{2}). There were 335 housing units at an average density of 9.3 per square mile (3.6/km^{2}). The racial makeup of the town was 98.88% White, 0.37% Native American, 0.62% Asian, and 0.12% from two or more races. Hispanic or Latino of any race were 1.12% of the population.

There were 291 households, out of which 34.4% had children under the age of 18 living with them, 70.1% were married couples living together, 3.4% had a female householder with no husband present, and 19.6% were non-families. 17.5% of all households were made up of individuals, and 7.2% had someone living alone who was 65 years of age or older. The average household size was 2.76 and the average family size was 3.07.

In the town, the population was spread out, with 26.6% under the age of 18, 8.0% from 18 to 24, 31.3% from 25 to 44, 23.0% from 45 to 64, and 11.1% who were 65 years of age or older. The median age was 37 years. For every 100 females, there were 104.6 males. For every 100 females age 18 and over, there were 106.3 males.

The median income for a household in the town was $42,875, and the median income for a family was $46,518. Males had a median income of $30,833 versus $20,625 for females. The per capita income for the town was $17,529. About 11.7% of families and 14.9% of the population were below the poverty line, including 22.9% of those under age 18 and 17.4% of those age 65 or over.
