= Waupaca County, Wisconsin =

County in Wisconsin, United States

- County
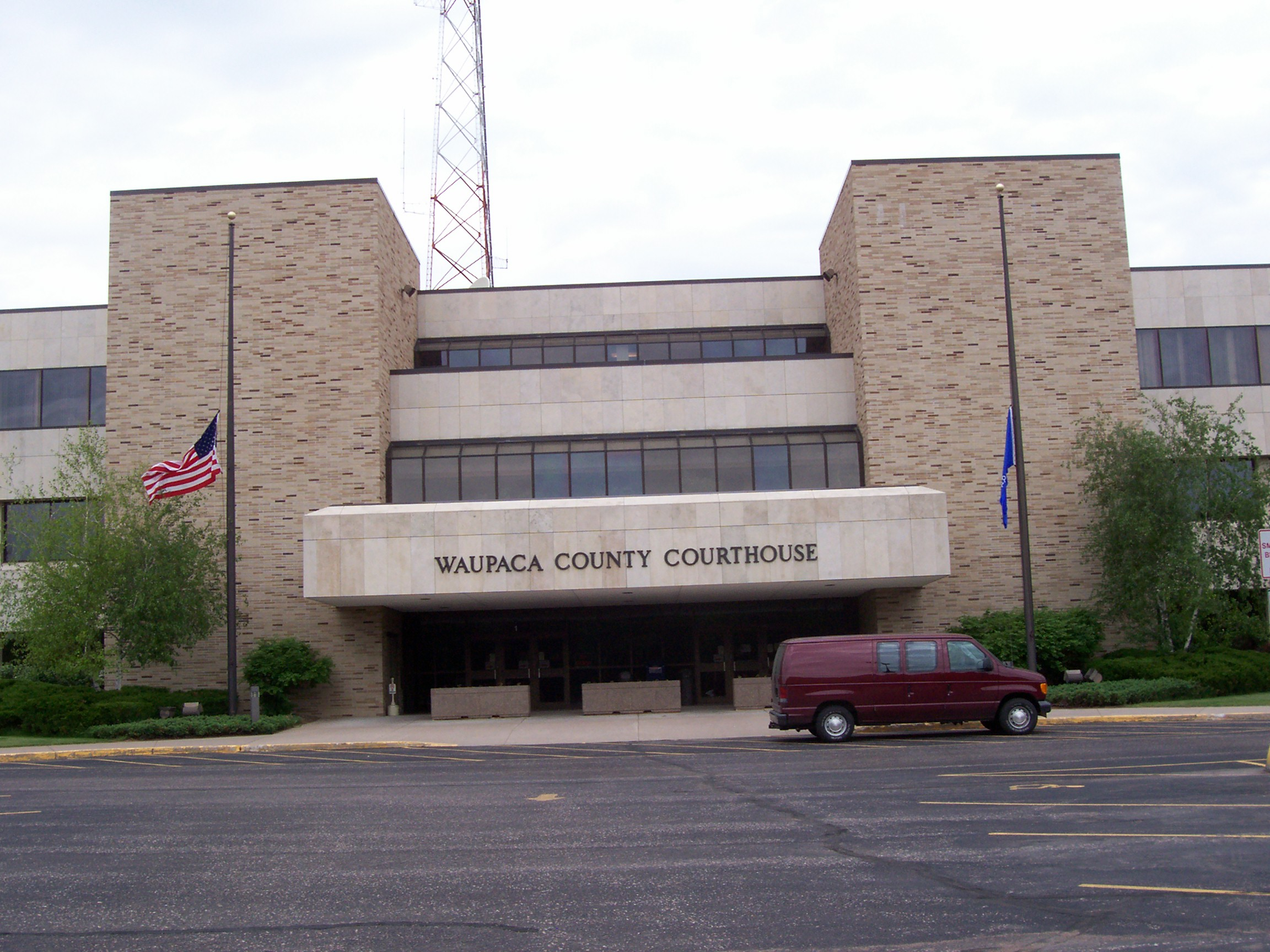
- Waupaca County Courthouse

- Location within the U.S. state of Wisconsin
- Coordinates: 44°29′N 88°58′W
- Country: United States
- State: Wisconsin
- Founded: 1853
- Named for: Menominee word, "Wāpahkoh," meaning "Place of Tomorrow Seen Clearly"
- Seat: Waupaca
- Largest city: New London

Area
  - Total: 765 sq mi (1,980 km^{2})
  - Land: 748 sq mi (1,940 km^{2})
  - Water: 17 sq mi (44 km^{2}) 2.3%

Population (2020)
  - Total: 51,812
  - Estimate (2025): 51,461 ▼
  - Density: 69.3/sq mi (26.8/km^{2})
- Time zone: UTC−6 (Central)
  - Summer (DST): UTC−5 (CDT)
- ZIP Codes: 54981
- Congressional district: 8th
- Website: www.waupacacounty-wi.gov

Waupaca County (/wəˈpækə/ wə-PAK-ə) is a county in the U.S. state of Wisconsin. As of the 2020 census, the population was 51,812. The county seat is Waupaca. The county was created in 1851 and organized in 1853. It is named after the Waupaca River, a Menominee language name meaning "place of tomorrow seen clearly."

== History ==
Ancient indigenous peoples constructed earthworks that expressed their religious and political concepts. An early European explorer counted 72 such earthen mounds in what is now Waupaca County, many of them in the form of effigy mounds, shaped like "humans, turtles, catfish and others." There were 52 mounds constructed around what is now called Taylor Lake. Most mounds were lost to agricultural development. One mound, shaped like a catfish, is still visible in a private yard along a County Hiway, just east of Taylor Lake. The site was marked by a local women's club with a commemorative plaque installed on a large stone.

Under pressure from European-American development, the Menominee people ceded their title to the United States for these lands by treaty in 1852. Following that, the flow of new migrant settlers greatly increased from the East, with people moving from New England, New York, and Ohio. They developed the land primarily for agricultural use in the early decades, also quickly establishing sawmills on the rivers.

In the 1870s railroads were constructed in the county: the Wisconsin Central in 1872 and the Green Bay and Minnesota Railroad (later known as Green Bay, Minnesota & St. Paul) in 1873. These improved the county's connections to markets for its lumber and other products. For a period, entrepreneurs and merchants gained high profits from the lumber industry, establishing many fine homes in the larger cities.

== Geography ==
According to the U.S. Census Bureau, the county has a total area of 765 square miles (1,980 km^{2}), of which 748 square miles (1,940 km^{2}) is land and 17 square miles (44 km^{2}) (2.3%) is water. The water includes 22 lakes that form the Waupaca Chain O' Lakes. These lakes are majority spring fed and connected by the Crystal River outlet. Waupaca County is also home to Partridge Lake on the Wolf River and the Waupaca River.

=== Major highways ===
- U.S. Highway 10
- U.S. Highway 45
- Wisconsin Highway 22
- Wisconsin Highway 49
- Wisconsin Highway 54
- Wisconsin Highway 76
- Wisconsin Highway 96
- Wisconsin Highway 110
- Wisconsin Highway 156
- Wisconsin Highway 161

=== Railroads ===
- Canadian National
- Watco

=== Airports ===
- KCLI – Clintonville Municipal Airport
- KPCZ – Waupaca Municipal Airport

=== Adjacent counties ===
- Shawano County – north
- Outagamie County – east
- Winnebago County – southeast
- Waushara County – southwest
- Portage County – west
- Marathon County – northwest

== Demographics ==
Historical population
Census	Pop.	Note	%±
1860	8,851		—
1870	15,539		75.6%
1880	20,955		34.9%
1890	26,794		27.9%
1900	31,615		18.0%
1910	32,782		3.7%
1920	34,200		4.3%
1930	33,513		−2.0%
1940	34,614		3.3%
1950	35,056		1.3%
1960	35,340		0.8%
1970	37,780		6.9%
1980	42,831		13.4%
1990	46,104		7.6%
2000	51,731		12.2%
2010	52,410		1.3%
2020	51,812		−1.1%
2025 (est.)	51,461	▼	−0.7%
U.S. Decennial Census; 1790–1960 1900–1990; 1990–2000 2010–2020

=== Racial and ethnic composition ===
Waupaca County, Wisconsin – Racial and ethnic composition Note: the US Census treats Hispanic/Latino as an ethnic category. This table excludes Latinos from the racial categories and assigns them to a separate category. Hispanics/Latinos may be of any race.
Race / ethnicity (NH = Non-Hispanic)	Pop 1980	Pop 1990	Pop 2000	Pop 2010	Pop 2020	% 1980	% 1990	% 2000	% 2010	% 2020
White alone (NH)	42,388	45,465	50,295	50,150	47,784	98.97%	98.61%	97.22%	95.69%	92.23%
Black or African American alone (NH)	5	22	82	149	202	0.01%	0.05%	0.16%	0.28%	0.39%
Native American or Alaska Native alone (NH)	107	121	211	234	242	0.25%	0.26%	0.41%	0.45%	0.47%
Asian alone (NH)	67	89	137	190	254	0.16%	0.19%	0.26%	0.36%	0.49%
Native Hawaiian or Pacific Islander alone (NH)	x	x	5	5	4	x	x	0.01%	0.01%	0.01%
Other race alone (NH)	18	1	19	19	105	0.04%	0.00%	0.04%	0.04%	0.20%
Mixed race or Multiracial (NH)	x	x	268	356	1,357	x	x	0.52%	0.68%	2.62%
Hispanic or Latino (any race)	246	406	714	1,307	1,864	0.57%	0.88%	1.38%	2.49%	3.60%
Total	42,831	46,104	51,731	52,410	51,812	100.00%	100.00%	100.00%	100.00%	100.00%

=== 2020 census ===
As of the 2020 census, the county had a population of 51,812. The population density was 69.3 people per square mile (26.8 people/km^{2}). There were 25,457 housing units at an average density of 34.0 units per square mile (13.1 units/km^{2}).

The median age was 46.1 years. 20.2% of residents were under the age of 18 and 22.3% of residents were 65 years of age or older. For every 100 females there were 103.2 males, and for every 100 females age 18 and over there were 102.3 males age 18 and over.

The racial makeup of the county was 93.2% White, 0.4% Black or African American, 0.6% American Indian and Alaska Native, 0.5% Asian, <0.1% Native Hawaiian and Pacific Islander, 1.6% from some other race, and 3.7% from two or more races. Hispanic or Latino residents of any race comprised 3.6% of the population.

36.4% of residents lived in urban areas, while 63.6% lived in rural areas.

There were 21,951 households in the county, of which 24.7% had children under the age of 18 living in them. Of all households, 50.5% were married-couple households, 19.6% were households with a male householder and no spouse or partner present, and 22.0% were households with a female householder and no spouse or partner present. About 29.9% of all households were made up of individuals and 14.0% had someone living alone who was 65 years of age or older.

Of the 25,457 housing units, 13.8% were vacant. Among occupied housing units, 74.4% were owner-occupied and 25.6% were renter-occupied. The homeowner vacancy rate was 1.2% and the rental vacancy rate was 6.4%.

=== 2000 census ===
2000 Census age pyramid for Waupaca County

As of the census of 2000, there were 51,731 people, 19,863 households, and 13,884 families residing in the county. The population density was 69 people per square mile (27 people/km^{2}). There were 22,508 housing units at an average density of 30 units per square mile (12 units/km^{2}). The racial makeup of the county was 97.93% White, 0.17% Black or African American, 0.42% Native American, 0.27% Asian, 0.01% Pacific Islander, 0.54% from other races, and 0.66% from two or more races. 1.38% of the population were Hispanic or Latino of any race. 53.1% were of German, 8.5% Norwegian and 6.8% Irish ancestry. 96.6% spoke English, 1.4% Spanish and 1.3% German as their first language.

There were 19,863 households, out of which 32.60% had children under the age of 18 living with them, 58.40% were married couples living together, 7.40% had a female householder with no husband present, and 30.10% were non-families. 25.20% of all households were made up of individuals, and 11.70% had someone living alone who was 65 years of age or older. The average household size was 2.51 and the average family size was 3.01.

By age, 25.70% of the population was under 18, 7.10% from 18 to 24, 27.80% from 25 to 44, 22.70% from 45 to 64, and 16.70% who were 65 or older. The median age was 38 years. For every 100 females there were 100.30 males. For every 100 females age 18 and over, there were 98.40 males.

In 2017, there were 505 births, giving a general fertility rate of 63.4 births per 1000 women aged 15–44, the 37th highest rate out of all 72 Wisconsin counties. Of these, 26 of the births occurred at home.

== Government ==
=== County offices ===
- County board chairman – David Morack
- Vice Chair – James Nygaard
- County clerk – Kristy K. Opperman
- County sheriff – Timothy Wilz

=== Politics ===
United States presidential election results for Waupaca County, Wisconsin
Year	Republican		Democratic		Third party(ies)	
Year	No.	%	No.	%	No.	%
1892	3,397	57.23%	2,186	36.83%	353	5.95%
1896	5,472	75.19%	1,577	21.67%	229	3.15%
1900	5,284	76.29%	1,383	19.97%	259	3.74%
1904	5,471	81.34%	942	14.01%	313	4.65%
1908	4,785	71.93%	1,483	22.29%	384	5.77%
1912	2,204	37.66%	1,563	26.70%	2,086	35.64%
1916	4,492	69.85%	1,720	26.75%	219	3.41%
1920	8,302	83.04%	888	8.88%	807	8.07%
1924	3,654	33.89%	665	6.17%	6,462	59.94%
1928	8,928	72.32%	3,307	26.79%	110	0.89%
1932	5,082	37.54%	8,179	60.42%	275	2.03%
1936	6,680	45.88%	6,920	47.52%	961	6.60%
1940	11,099	69.95%	4,616	29.09%	151	0.95%
1944	11,495	74.44%	3,879	25.12%	68	0.44%
1948	8,764	67.51%	4,020	30.97%	198	1.53%
1952	13,693	81.38%	3,105	18.45%	28	0.17%
1956	11,798	78.64%	3,133	20.88%	72	0.48%
1960	12,247	72.61%	4,606	27.31%	14	0.08%
1964	8,381	54.46%	6,990	45.42%	18	0.12%
1968	10,606	67.13%	3,978	25.18%	1,215	7.69%
1972	11,040	70.13%	4,418	28.07%	284	1.80%
1976	10,849	60.13%	6,857	38.00%	337	1.87%
1980	12,568	61.71%	6,401	31.43%	1,397	6.86%
1984	13,097	68.33%	5,895	30.76%	175	0.91%
1988	11,559	61.62%	7,078	37.74%	120	0.64%
1992	10,252	44.27%	6,666	28.78%	6,241	26.95%
1996	8,679	45.10%	7,800	40.53%	2,764	14.36%
2000	12,980	56.92%	8,787	38.53%	1,037	4.55%
2004	15,941	59.10%	10,792	40.01%	241	0.89%
2008	12,232	47.95%	12,952	50.77%	327	1.28%
2012	14,002	54.19%	11,578	44.81%	260	1.01%
2016	16,209	62.12%	8,451	32.39%	1,435	5.50%
2020	18,952	65.06%	9,703	33.31%	475	1.63%
2024	20,093	66.09%	9,947	32.72%	363	1.19%

Waupaca County has long been one of the most Republican counties in Wisconsin. Only two Democrats have carried the county at the presidential level since the formation of the Republican Party – Franklin D. Roosevelt in 1932 and 1936, and Barack Obama in 2008, and in 1936 Roosevelt only won by plurality because of a sizeable vote for Union Party nominee William Lemke. It was one of only three Wisconsin counties, alongside Walworth and Waushara, to vote for Barry Goldwater over Lyndon Johnson in 1964.

In other statewide races, the county is equally Republican. The only Democratic gubernatorial candidate it has backed since at least 1908 is Albert Schmedeman in 1932. Senators Herb Kohl in 2006 and William Proxmire in 1976 and 1970 did carry Waupaca County when they swept every county in the state, but no other Democratic senatorial candidate has won the county since the Seventeenth Amendment.

== Communities ==
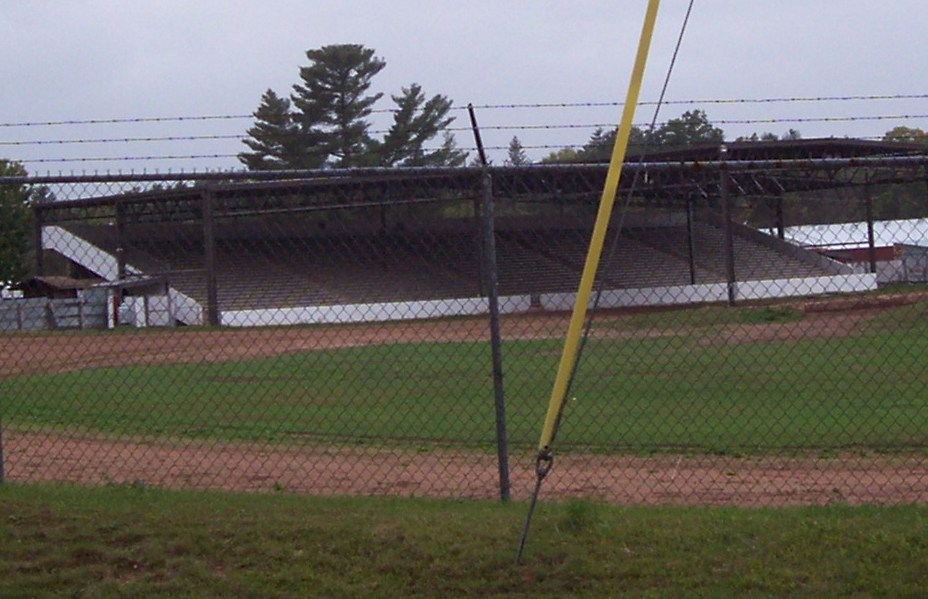
Waupaca County Fairgrounds

=== Cities ===
- Clintonville
- Manawa
- Marion (partly in Shawano County)
- New London (partly in Outagamie County)
- Waupaca (county seat)
- Weyauwega

=== Villages ===
- Big Falls
- Embarrass
- Fremont
- Iola
- Ogdensburg
- Scandinavia

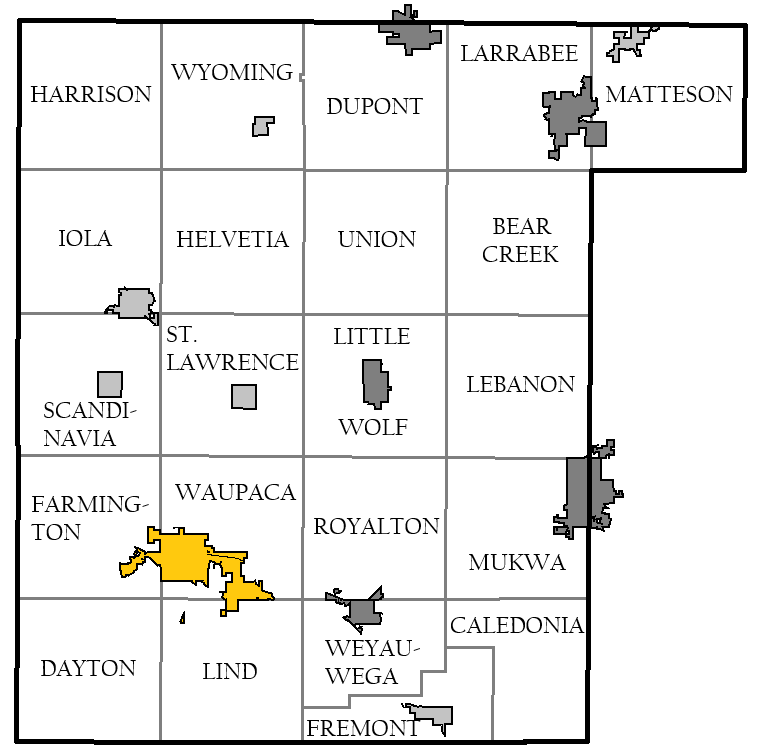
Towns of Waupaca County

=== Towns ===
- Bear Creek
- Caledonia
- Dayton
- Dupont
- Farmington
- Fremont
- Harrison
- Helvetia
- Iola
- Larrabee
- Lebanon
- Lind
- Little Wolf
- Matteson
- Mukwa
- Royalton
- Scandinavia
- St. Lawrence
- Union
- Waupaca
- Weyauwega
- Wyoming

=== Census-designated places ===
- Chain O' Lakes
- King
- Northport

=== Unincorporated communities ===
- Baldwins Mill
- Bear Creek Corners
- Buckbee
- Carmel
- Cobb Town
- Evanswood
- Gills Landing
- Hunting (partial)
- Lind Center
- Little Hope
- Nicholson
- Northland
- North Readfield
- Norske
- Ostrander
- Parfreyville
- Readfield
- Red Banks
- Royalton
- Rural
- Shaw Landing
- Sheridan
- Schmidt Corner
- Symco

=== Ghost towns/neighborhoods ===
- Granite City
- Granite Quarry
- Hatton
- Little Wolf
- Marble
- Nowell
- Petersville

== See also ==
- National Register of Historic Places listings in Waupaca County, Wisconsin
