= List of ghost towns in Wisconsin =

This is an incomplete list of ghost towns in Wisconsin.

== Classification ==
=== Barren site ===
- Sites no longer in existence
- Sites that have been destroyed
- Covered with water
- Reverted to pasture
- May have a few difficult to find foundations/footings at most

=== Neglected site ===
- Only rubble left
- Roofless building ruins
- Buildings or houses still standing, but majority are roofless

=== Abandoned site ===
- Building or houses still standing
- Buildings and houses all abandoned
- No population, except caretaker
- Site no longer in existence except for one or two buildings, for example old church, grocery store

=== Semi-abandoned site ===
- Building or houses still standing
- Buildings and houses largely abandoned
- Few residents
- Many abandoned buildings
- Small population

=== Historic community ===
- Building or houses still standing
- Still a busy community
- Smaller than its boom years
- Population has decreased dramatically, to one fifth or less

== Ghost towns ==
Town name	Other names	County	Latitude/longitude	Established	Disestablished	Current status	Remarks
Adams Center		Adams	43°54′58″N 89°47′50″W	1964			
Adamsville		Iowa	42°54′26″N 89°54′45″W				Birthplace of Alva Adams
Anchorage		Buffalo	44°16′07″N 91°45′26″W			Barren	
Apostle Islands		Ashland and Bayfield	46°55′48″N 90°37′59″W	September 26, 1970			
Army Lake		Walworth	42°48′24″N 88°22′31″W				
Ashford		Richland	43°20′48″N 90°28′05″W				
Attica		Green	42°46′12″N 89°28′50″W				Now part of the town of Brooklyn.
Aurora		Kenosha		April 30, 1891		Barren	Site of one of the area's earliest post offices; now part of the city of Kenosha.
Bagdad		Forest	45°39′22″N 88°42′13″W			Barren	
Belmont		Lafayette	40°46'7"N 90°22'49"W	1836	1837		First Wisconsin territorial capital; abandoned after one session. Located about three miles NW of the present town of Belmont.
Benson's Corner	Nixon Corner, Bristol Corner	Kenosha					Located "just up the road" from the present community of Bristol.
Bissell		Kenosha				Absorbed	Now part of the village of Bristol.
Bluff Siding		Buffalo					
Bohri		Buffalo	44°08′42″N 91°36′10″W				
Calhoun		Waukesha					
Ceresco	the Wisconsin Phalanx	Fond du Lac	43°50′55″N 88°51′6″W	1844	1858		A commune founded by followers of the communitarian socialist ideas of Charles Fourier.
Charter Oak Mills		Jackson	44°16′07″N 90°52′30″W				
Cheyenne Valley		Vernon		1855	c. 1930s		
Clarence		Green	42°35′26″N 89°23′54″W				
Clason Prairie		Dodge					
Clay		Jackson	44°23′46″N 90°40′50″W				
Clay Banks		Door					
Cooksville		Rock					
Coolidge		Price	45°48'42"N 90°24'29"W				
Cortland		Trempealeau	44°12'50"N 91°34'04"W				
Corwin		Richland	43°30′12″N 90°16′53″W				
Cream	Eagle Creek	Buffalo					
Crusher		Dodge					
Cypress	Hoadley	Kenosha					There is some confusion as to whether Cypress was a later designator of Pikeville, or geographically distinct.
De Noon		Waukesha and Racine					
Delhi		Winnebago	44°01'22"N 88°48'08"W				
Dell Prairie		Adams	43°40'02"N 89°42'55"W				
Dellwood		Adams					
Dill		Adams					
Dirty Hollow		Iowa	42°57′48″N 90°7′52″W				Today incorporated into the city of Dodgeville.
Dodges Corners		Waukesha	42°51'32"N 88°14'30"W				
Donaldson		Vilas					
Dover	Known variously as Heyworth, Reevesville, East Arena, and Ghorstville prior to 1851	Iowa	43°9′43″N 89°50′18″W	1844	ca. 1870		Originally established by the British Temperance and Emigration Society, Dover was slowly abandoned when it was bypassed by the railroad in favor of Mazomanie.
Dunville		Dunn					
Emerson		Iron					
Exeter		Green					
Falls City		Eau Claire					
Farmers Grove		Green	42°47'06"N 89°43'27"W				
Fellows		Rock	42°44'53"N 89°12'03"W				
Fordham		Adams	43°58'55"N 89°44'20"W				
Fort Crawford		Crawford					
Fort Howard		Brown					
Foscoro		Door					
Frenchtown		Dane					
Good Hope		Milwaukee					
Granite City		Waupaca	44°38'02"N 88°59'28"W				
Granite Quarry		Waupaca	44°25'02"N 89°04'04"W				
Gratiot's Grove		Lafayette					
Harmon		Washburn	46°04′04″N 91°40′06″W				
Harrison		Calumet	44°08′03″N 88°17′30″W				
Hatton		Waupaca	44°15′34″N 88°59′20″W				
Helena	Old Helena, Helena Station	Iowa					
Henrietta		Richland					
Horns Pier		Door					
Jefferson Prairie Settlement		Rock	42°29'37"N 88°51'48"W				
Kaiser		Price	45°54'35"N 90°33'06"W				
Keith		Forest	45°30′30″N 88°52′58″W				
Kennedy		Price	45.9102815,-90.6662547				
Kennedys Corners		Sheboygan	43°40′28″N 87°52′13″W				
Klondike Corner	Klondike	Kenosha	42.590271 -88.134038				Now part of Brighton.
Knowlton		Marathon					
Knox Mills		Price	45.5000037,-90.1302873				
Kurth		Clark	44°34′27″N 90°29′48″W				
Lake Emily		Portage	44°28′40″N 89°20′05″W				
LaRue		Sauk					
Lawesburg		Outagamie	44°15′31.02″N 88°23′00.47″W				
Lime Rock		Outagamie	44°30′03.52″N 88°21′03.77″W				
Little Wolf		Waupaca	44°25′20″N 88°54′05″W				
Manson		Oneida					
Maple Works		Clark					
Marble		Waupaca	44°33′45″N 88°52′15″W				
Mayhews		Walworth	42°45′47″N 88°29′24″W				
McGrew		Richland	43.3975039,-90.5013984				
Mill Creek		Richland	43.3866706,-90.5527107				
Millville		Grant					
Minersville		Iowa	42.963337 -90.133299				Today incorporated into the city of Dodgeville.
Moe Settlement		Columbia	43°35′55″N 89°41′58″W				
Moscow		Iowa					
Muskego Settlement		Racine					
Nasbro		Dodge					
Nelsonville		Eau Claire	44°39′15″N 91°34′12″W				
Neshonoc		La Crosse					
New Cassel		Fond du Lac					Eventually absorbed into Campellsport.
New Chester		Adams					
New City		Trempealeau	44.3488927,-91.4498658				
New Diggings		Lafayette					
New Upsala		Waukesha					
Nowell		Waupaca	44°29′22″N 88°47′53″W				
Oak Grove		Eau Claire	44°40′21″N 91°36′19″W				
Oakwood		Milwaukee					
Oil City		Monroe					
Old Tyrone		Dunn	44°42′50″N 91°50′34″W				
Perote		Menominee	45°05′28″N 88°48′46″W				
Petersville		Waupaca	44°32′18″N 89°11′00″W				
Pikeville Corners	Pikeville	Kenosha	42.49613 -88.0332206				While Pikeville continues to exist as a geographical place name on modern maps, today it is incorporated into the village of Bristol. See also Cypress, above.
Pilot Knob		Adams	43.9875038,-89.6355651				
Pleasant Ridge		Grant	42°49′52″N 90°48′47″W	c. 1850	1959		Settled by formerly enslaved African Americans in the 1850s, Pleasant Ridge was home to over 100 people, approximately half of whom were African Americans, through the early 20th century. The last resident died in 1959.
Pokerville		Dane					
Porter's Mills		Eau Claire	44°46′15″N 91°34′01″W				
Quincy		Adams					
Ranney		Kenosha					
Raymond Center		Racine					
Reeds Corners		Fond du Lac					
Roche a Cri		Adams	44.0536149,-90.9539387				
Rodney		Waushara	43°59′07″N 89°07′42″W				
Rogneys		Jackson	44.193337 -91.060799				
Root Creek		Milwaukee					
Sacramento		Waushara					
Savoy		Buffalo	44.523609 -92.058620				
Schultz		Green					
Selma	Sand Ridge	Kenosha					
Sinnipee		Grant	42°34′31″N 90°39′25″W				
Springbluff		Adams	43.9233371,-91.9189887				
Springdale		Buffalo	44.523609 -92.058620				
St. Feriole Island		Crawford					
St. Martin's		Milwaukee					
Staadts		Marathon					
Star Lake		Vilas					
Stettin		Marathon					
Stewart		Green					
Stonefield		Grant					
Stonehaven		Ozaukee	43°29'48"N 87°47'41"W	1901	1925		Former company town of the Lake Shore Stone Company. Residents moved when the company closed the nearby quarry in 1925.
Sugar Bush		Marinette					Destroyed in the great fire of 1871
Trow		Clark	44°29′30″N 90°45′46″W				
Turtleville		Rock					
Valley		Vernon	43°64'17"N 90°54'18"W				
Voree ("Garden of Peace")		Adams					
Wakefield		Outagamie	44°15′56.33″N 88°32′13.52″W				
Welch Point		Dunn	44°42′10″N 92°00′46″W				
Wells		Calumet, Manitowoc					
Willet		Green	42.723337 -89.811676				
Williamsburg		Trempealeau	44.3138927,-91.4632998				
Williamsonville		Door					Destroyed in the great fire of 1871
Winooski		Sheboygan	43°42′25″N 87°59′2″W				
Witcome		Shawano					
Woodworth		Kenosha	42.558074, −88.001192				While Woodworth continues as a geographical designator on modern maps, it is today incorporated into the village of Bristol.
Worden		Clark					
Wrightsville		Jackson	44.414448 -90.8536				
Zarahemla		Lafayette					
Ziegler		Marathon					
