= Monroe, Wisconsin (disambiguation) =

Monroe, Wisconsin is a city in Green County.

Monroe, Wisconsin may also refer to:

- Monroe, Adams County, Wisconsin, a town
- Monroe (town), Green County, Wisconsin, a town

== See also ==
- Monroe Center, Wisconsin, an unincorporated community
- Monroe County, Wisconsin
