= Easton, Wisconsin =

Easton is the name of some places in the U.S. state of Wisconsin:

- Easton, Adams County, Wisconsin, a town
- Easton (community), Wisconsin, in Adams County, an unincorporated community
- Easton, Marathon County, Wisconsin, a town
