= Stanberry =

Stanberry may refer to:

== Places ==
- Stanberry, Missouri
- Stanberry, Wisconsin, an unincorporated community

== People with the surname ==
- John Stanberry, 15th-century English Roman Catholic bishop

== See also ==
- Henry Stanbery, American lawyer and Presidential Cabinet member
- Stan Berry, American politician
