= Davis Corner =

Davis Corner or Davis Corners may refer to:

- Davis Corner, Virginia Beach, Virginia, Princess Anne County, Virginia
- Davis Corners, Ontario
- Davis Corners, Wisconsin
