= Quincy, Wisconsin =

- Town
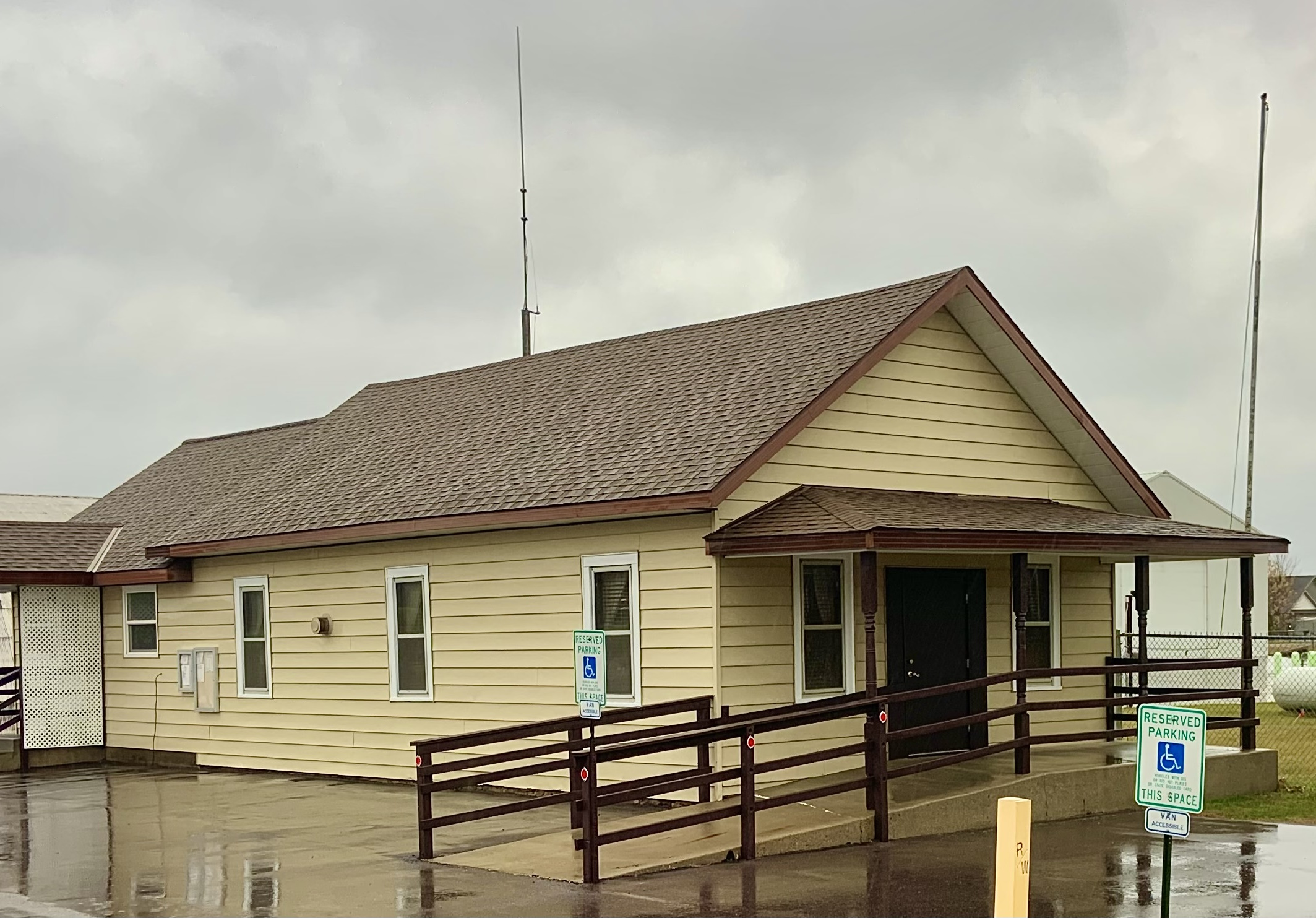
- Town hall

- Location in Adams County and the state of Wisconsin.
- Coordinates: 43°55′18″N 89°56′5″W
- Country: United States
- State: Wisconsin
- County: Adams

Area
  - Total: 39.6 sq mi (102.6 km^{2})
  - Land: 32.4 sq mi (84.0 km^{2})
  - Water: 7.2 sq mi (18.6 km^{2})
- Elevation: 896 ft (273 m)

Population (2020)
  - Total: 1,159
  - Density: 35.7/sq mi (13.8/km^{2})
- Time zone: UTC-6 (Central (CST))
  - Summer (DST): UTC-5 (CDT)
- Area code: 608
- FIPS code: 55-65825
- GNIS feature ID: 1583990
- Website: quincywi.gov

Quincy is a town in Adams County in the U.S. state of Wisconsin. The population was 1,159 at the 2020 census, slightly down from 1,163 at the 2010 census. The ghost town of Quincy was located in the town.

== Geography ==
Quincy is located in western Adams County at 43°53′34″N 89°54′44″W (43.893020, −89.912330). Its western border is the Wisconsin River, part of which is impounded within Castle Rock Lake, a large reservoir. Quincy Bluff is an 1,180-foot-high (360 m), 2-mile-long (3.2 km) ridge that rises 250 feet (76 m) above the surrounding land in the southern part of the town.

According to the United States Census Bureau, the town has a total area of 39.6 square miles (102.6 km^{2}), of which 32.4 square miles (84.0 km^{2}) is land and 7.2 square miles (18.6 km^{2}), or 18.17%, is water.

== Demographics ==
Historical population
Census	Pop.	Note	%±
1870	478		—
1880	397		−16.9%
1890	393		−1.0%
1900	432		9.9%
1910	424		−1.9%
1920	404		−4.7%
1930	320		−20.8%
1940	312		−2.5%
1950	251		−19.6%
1960	249		−0.8%
1970	444		78.3%
1980	639		43.9%
1990	927		45.1%
2000	1,181		27.4%
2010	1,163		−1.5%
2020	1,159		−0.3%
U.S. Decennial Census

As of the census of 2000, there were 1,181 people, 569 households, and 361 families residing in the town. The population density was 36.0 people per square mile (13.9 people/km^{2}). There were 1,614 housing units at an average density of 49.2 units per square mile (19.0 units/km^{2}). The racial makeup of the town was 98.73% White, 0.08% African American, 0.34% Native American, 0.08% Asian, 0.25% from other races, and 0.51% from two or more races. Hispanic or Latino of any race were 0.76% of the population.

There were 569 households, out of which 14.6% had children under the age of 18 living with them, 56.1% were married couples living together, 4.2% had a female householder with no husband present, and 36.4% were non-families. 29.9% of all households were made up of individuals, and 17.2% had someone living alone who was 65 years of age or older. The average household size was 2.08 and the average family size was 2.49.

In the town, the population was spread out, with 14.1% under the age of 18, 4.1% from 18 to 24, 20.5% from 25 to 44, 29.7% from 45 to 64, and 31.6% who were 65 years of age or older. The median age was 54 years. For every 100 females, there were 99.2 males. For every 100 females age 18 and over, there were 95.2 males.

The median income for a household in the town was $26,533, and the median income for a family was $33,529. Males had a median income of $32,024 versus $22,188 for females. The per capita income for the town was $16,460. About 6.4% of families and 10.1% of the population were below the poverty line, including 6.2% of those under age 18 and 6.9% of those age 65 or over.

== Education ==
It is in the Adams-Friendship Area School District.
