= Strongs Prairie, Wisconsin =

Town of Strongs Prairie
- Town
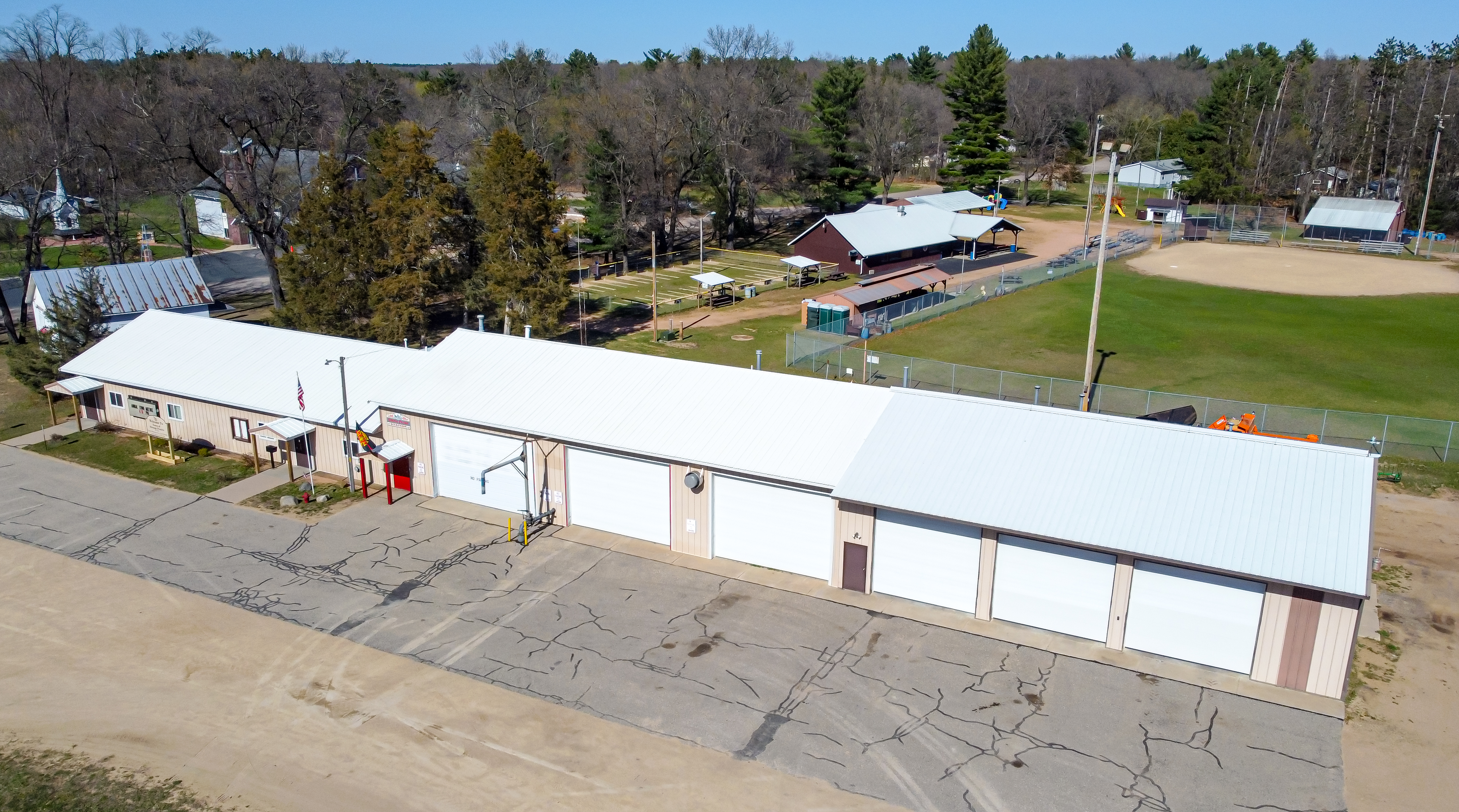
- Town hall

- Location in Adams County and the state of Wisconsin.
- Coordinates: 44°0′58″N 89°55′38″W
- Country: United States
- State: Wisconsin
- County: Adams

Area
  - Total: 52.0 sq mi (134.6 km^{2})
  - Land: 47.1 sq mi (122.0 km^{2})
  - Water: 4.9 sq mi (12.6 km^{2})
- Elevation: 950 ft (290 m)

Population (2020)
  - Total: 1,145
  - Density: 24.31/sq mi (9.385/km^{2})
- Time zone: UTC-6 (Central (CST))
  - Summer (DST): UTC-5 (CDT)
- Area code: 608
- FIPS code: 55-77800
- GNIS feature ID: 1584236
- Website: strongsprairie.gov

The Town of Strongs Prairie is located in Adams County in the U.S. state of Wisconsin. The population was 1,145 at the 2020 census. The unincorporated communities of Arkdale, Dellwood, and Strongs Prairie are located within the town.

== Geography ==
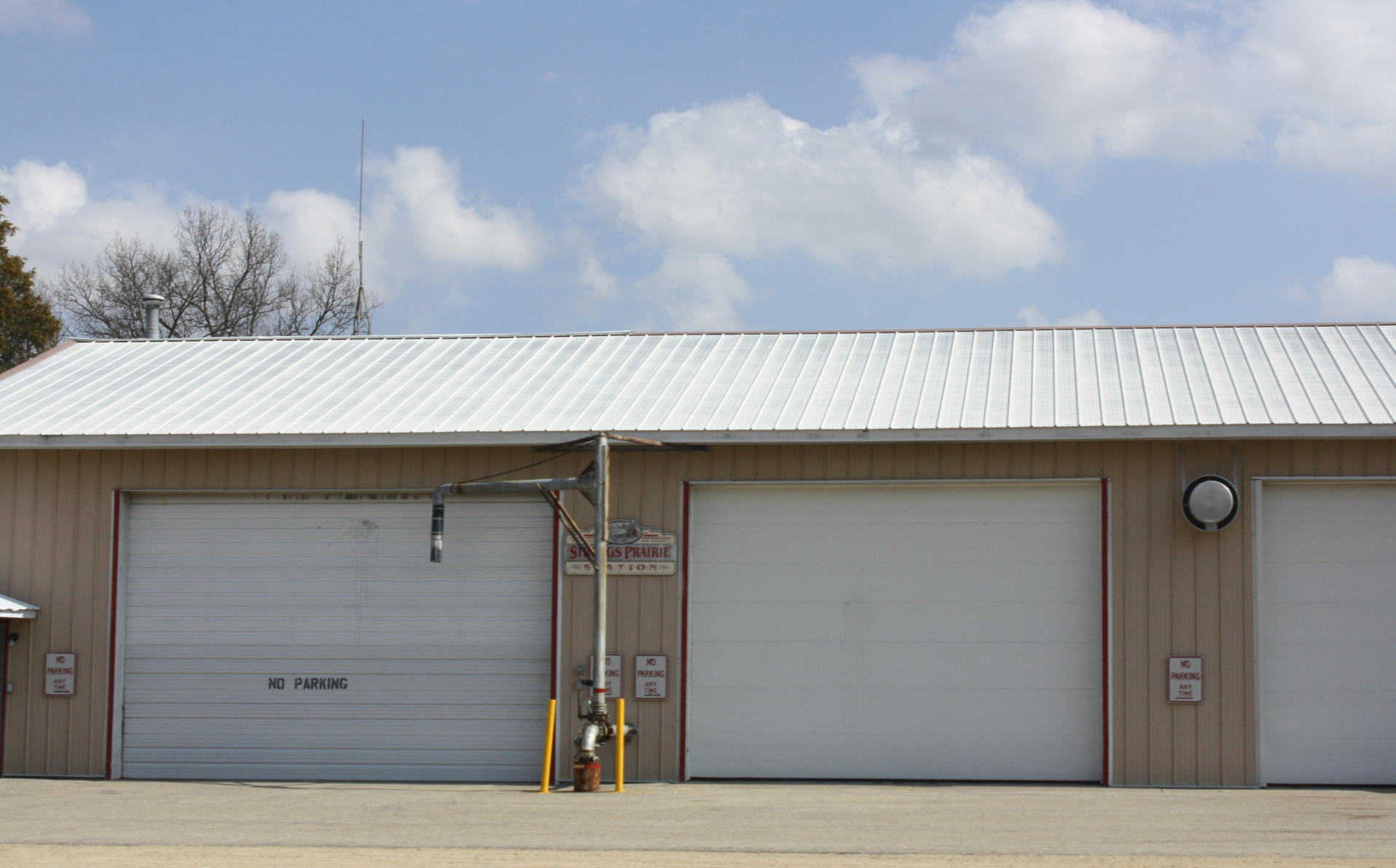
Fire station

Strongs Prairie is located along the Wisconsin River, the western border of Adams County. Two impoundments on the river, Castle Rock Lake and Petenwell Lake, are partly within the town.

According to the United States Census Bureau, the town has a total area of 52.0 square miles (134.6 km^{2}), of which 47.1 square miles (122.0 km^{2}) is land and 4.9 square miles (12.6 km^{2}), or 9.35%, is water.

== Demographics ==
Historical population
Census	Pop.	Note	%±
1870	1,043		—
1880	947		−9.2%
1890	870		−8.1%
1900	958		10.1%
1910	963		0.5%
1920	887		−7.9%
1930	771		−13.1%
1940	755		−2.1%
1950	708		−6.2%
1960	644		−9.0%
1970	720		11.8%
1980	876		21.7%
1990	1,028		17.4%
2000	1,115		8.5%
2010	1,150		3.1%
2020	1,145		−0.4%
U.S. Decennial Census

As of the census of 2000, there were 1,115 people, 502 households, and 345 families residing in the town. The population density was 23.5 people per square mile (9.1 people/km^{2}). There were 979 housing units at an average density of 20.6 units per square mile (8.0 units/km^{2}). The racial makeup of the town was 98.39% White, 0.09% African American, 0.27% Native American, 0.27% Asian, 0.63% from other races, and 0.36% from two or more races. Hispanic or Latino of any race were 1.35% of the population.

There were 502 households, out of which 19.5% had children under the age of 18 living with them, 59.4% were married couples living together, 5.0% had a female householder with no husband present, and 31.1% were non-families. 26.1% of all households were made up of individuals, and 11.2% had someone living alone who was 65 years of age or older. The average household size was 2.22 and the average family size was 2.62.

In the town, the population was spread out, with 17.6% under the age of 18, 5.8% from 18 to 24, 21.9% from 25 to 44, 32.2% from 45 to 64, and 22.5% who were 65 years of age or older. The median age was 48 years. For every 100 females, there were 110.0 males. For every 100 females age 18 and over, there were 106.5 males.

The median income for a household in the town was $30,048, and the median income for a family was $34,375. Males had a median income of $31,141 versus $20,543 for females. The per capita income for the town was $15,583. About 10.3% of families and 12.7% of the population were below the poverty line, including 20.0% of those under age 18 and 11.2% of those age 65 or over.

== Education ==
It is in the Adams-Friendship Area School District.
