= Colburn, Adams County, Wisconsin =

Colburn, Wisconsin
- Town
- Location in Adams County and the state of Wisconsin.

- Location within Wisconsin Location within the United States
- Coordinates: 44°7′57″N 89°40′7″W
- Country: United States
- State: Wisconsin
- County: Adams

Area
  - Total: 35.92 sq mi (93.02 km^{2})
  - Land: 35.90 sq mi (92.97 km^{2})
  - Water: 0.019 sq mi (0.05 km^{2})
- Elevation: 1,037 ft (316 m)

Population (2020)
  - Total: 215
  - Density: 5.99/sq mi (2.31/km^{2})
- Time zone: UTC-6 (Central (CST))
  - Summer (DST): UTC-5 (CDT)
- Area code: 608
- FIPS code: 55-16075
- GNIS feature ID: 1582995
- Website: colburnadamswi.gov

Colburn is a town in Adams County in the U.S. state of Wisconsin. The population was 215 at the 2020 census, down from 223 at the 2010 census. The town was most likely named for Sherman Colburn, who immigrated to Wisconsin from Vermont in 1855 and became a farmer in the area.

== Geography ==
Colburn is located at 44°6′44″N 89°39′22″W (44.112430, −89.656160).

According to the United States Census Bureau, the town has a total area of 35.9 square miles (93.0 km^{2}), of which 0.019 square miles (0.05 km^{2}), or 0.05%, is water.

== Demographics ==
Historical population
Census	Pop.	Note	%±
1900	392		—
1910	413		5.4%
1920	328		−20.6%
1930	213		−35.1%
1940	254		19.2%
1950	170		−33.1%
1960	142		−16.5%
1970	121		−14.8%
1980	177		46.3%
1990	154		−13.0%
2000	181		17.5%
2010	223		23.2%
2020	215		−3.6%
U.S. Decennial Census

As of the census of 2000, there were 181 people, 83 households, and 56 families residing in the town. The population density was 5.0 people per square mile (1.9/km^{2}). There were 155 housing units at an average density of 4.3 per square mile (1.7/km^{2}). The racial makeup of the town was 92.82% White, 0.55% African American, 3.87% Native American, and 2.76% from two or more races. Hispanic or Latino of any race were 3.87% of the population.

There were 83 households, out of which 14.5% had children under the age of 18 living with them, 57.8% were married couples living together, 6.0% had a female householder with no husband present, and 32.5% were non-families. 24.1% of all households were made up of individuals, and 7.2% had someone living alone who was 65 years of age or older. The average household size was 2.18 and the average family size was 2.54.

In the town, the population was spread out, with 14.4% under the age of 18, 7.2% from 18 to 24, 26.0% from 25 to 44, 32.0% from 45 to 64, and 20.4% who were 65 years of age or older. The median age was 48 years. For every 100 females, there were 123.5 males. For every 100 females age 18 and over, there were 115.3 males.

The median income for a household in the town was $35,250, and the median income for a family was $35,375. Males had a median income of $26,250 versus $15,313 for females. The per capita income for the town was $21,440. About 2.9% of families and 5.9% of the population were below the poverty line, including 12.5% of those under the age of eighteen and 5.4% of those 65 or over.

== Education ==
It is in the Adams-Friendship Area School District.
