= White Creek, Wisconsin =

- Unincorporated community
- Location within Wisconsin Location within the United States
- Coordinates: 43°49′33″N 89°51′17″W
- Country: United States
- State: Wisconsin
- County: Adams
- Town: Easton
- Elevation: 886 ft (270 m)
- Time zone: UTC-6 (Central (CST))
  - Summer (DST): UTC-5 (CDT)
- Area code: 608
- GNIS feature ID: 1576633

White Creek is an unincorporated community located in the town of Easton, Adams County, Wisconsin, United States. White Creek is located on County Highway H and White Creek, 9.5 miles (15.3 km) south-southwest of Adams.

Seth Thompson founded the community, which he originally named Cascade, in 1853. He changed the name to White Creek when he opened its post office in August 1855; the new name came from the white foam on the local creek's surface.
