= Rome, Wisconsin =

Rome is the name of some places in the U.S. state of Wisconsin:

- Rome, Adams County, Wisconsin, a town
  - Rome (community), Adams County, Wisconsin, an unincorporated community
- Rome, Jefferson County, Wisconsin, a census-designated place
- Rome, Wisconsin, a fictional town in the television series Picket Fences
- Rome, Wisconsin, a fictional town in Ayn Rand's Atlas Shrugged

== See also ==
- New Rome, Wisconsin, an unincorporated community
