= Arkdale, Wisconsin =

Census-designated place in Wisconsin, United States

- Census-designated place
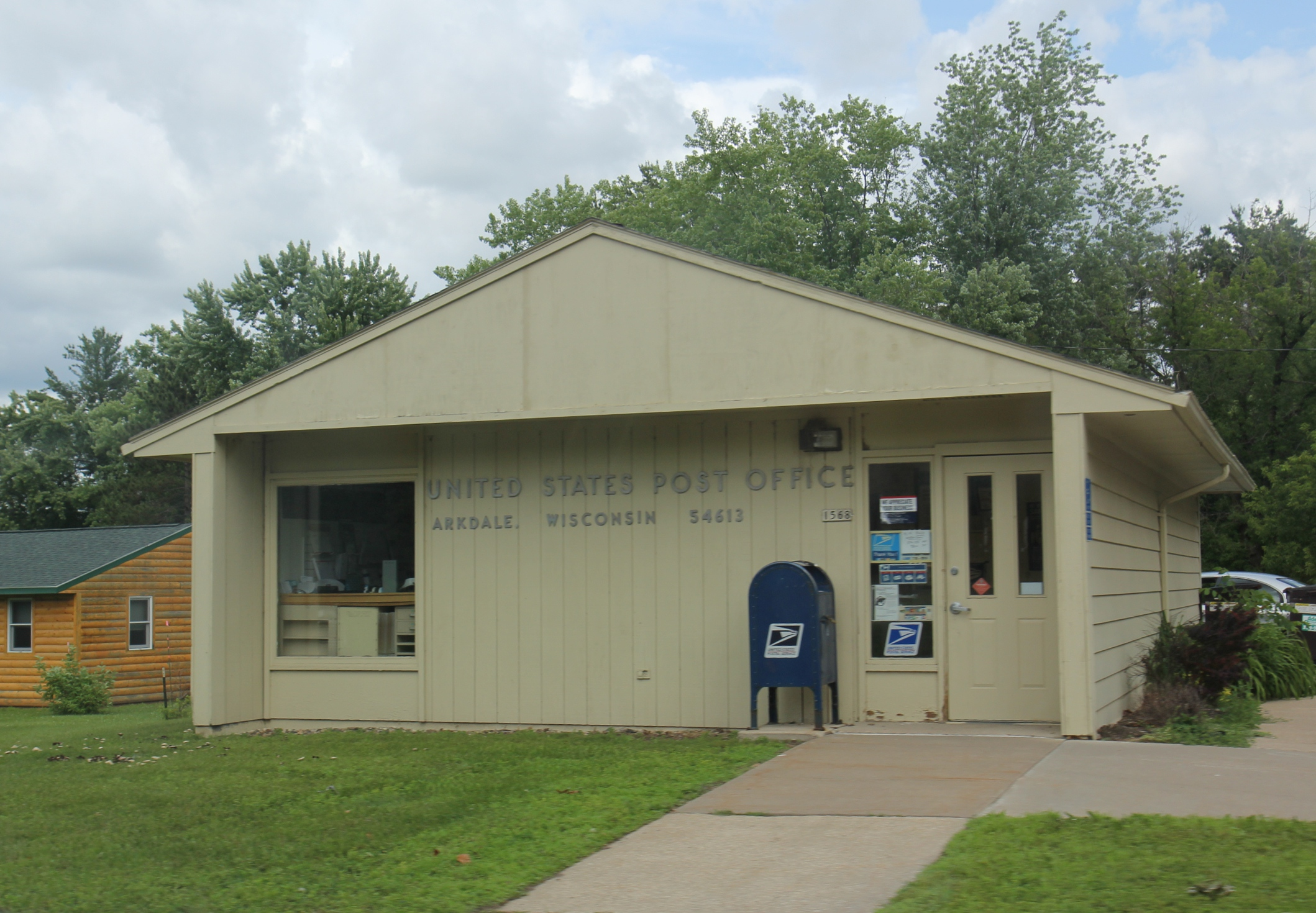
- Arkdale Post Office in 2014.

- Location in Adams County and the state of Wisconsin.
- Coordinates: 44°01′38″N 89°53′16″W
- Country: United States
- State: Wisconsin
- County: Adams
- Town: Strongs Prairie

Area
  - Total: 2.22 sq mi (5.75 km^{2})
  - Land: 2.15 sq mi (5.56 km^{2})
  - Water: 0.077 sq mi (0.20 km^{2})
- Elevation: 935 ft (285 m)

Population (2020)
  - Total: 201
  - Density: 93.6/sq mi (36.2/km^{2})
- Time zone: UTC-6 (Central (CST))
  - Summer (DST): UTC-5 (CDT)
- Area code: 608
- GNIS feature ID: 1560396

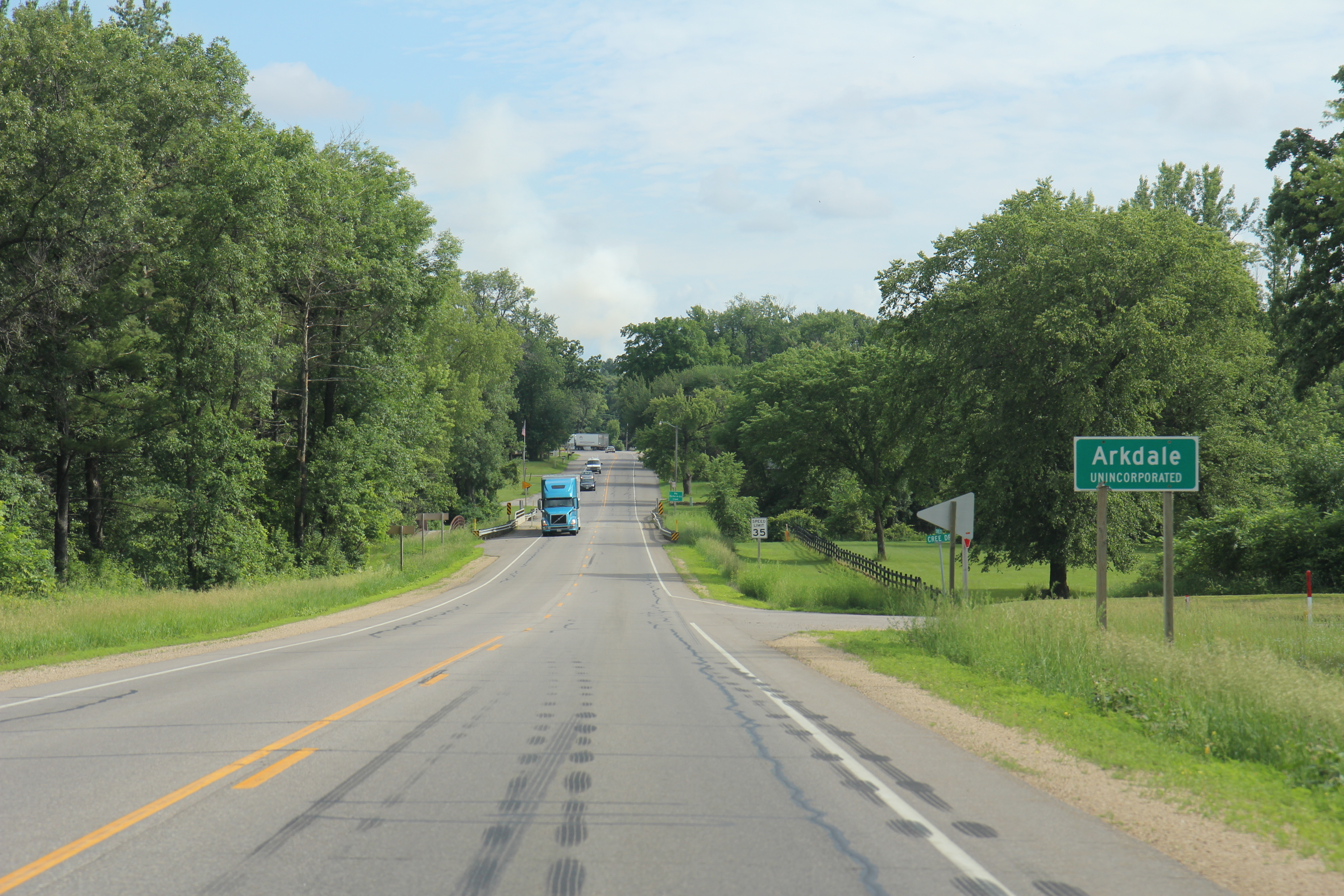
Sign for Arkdale

Arkdale is an unincorporated census-designated place in the town of Strongs Prairie in Adams County, Wisconsin, United States. As of the 2020 Census, its population was 201. Arkdale has an area of 2.221 square miles (5.75 km^{2}); 2.144 square miles (5.55 km^{2}) of this is land, and 0.077 square miles (0.20 km^{2}) is water.

== Demographics ==
Historical population
Census	Pop.	Note	%±
2010	158		—
2020	201		27.2%
U.S. Decennial Census

== Education ==
It is in the Adams-Friendship Area School District.
