= Lake Sherwood, Wisconsin =

Census-designated place in Wisconsin, United States

- Census-designated place
- Location in Adams County and the state of Wisconsin.
- Coordinates: 44°12′23″N 89°47′17″W
- Country: United States
- State: Wisconsin
- County: Adams
- Town: Rome

Area
  - Total: 1.404 sq mi (3.64 km^{2})
  - Land: 1.054 sq mi (2.73 km^{2})
  - Water: 0.350 sq mi (0.91 km^{2})
- Elevation: 1,014 ft (309 m)

Population (2020)
  - Total: 357
  - Density: 339/sq mi (131/km^{2})
- Time zone: UTC-6 (Central (CST))
  - Summer (DST): UTC-5 (CDT)
- Area code: 608
- GNIS feature ID: 2586519

Lake Sherwood is a census-designated place in the town of Rome, Adams County, Wisconsin, United States. Its population was 357 at the 2020 census, down from 372 at the 2010 census.

== Education ==
It is in the Nekoosa School District.
