= Dellwood, Adams County, Wisconsin =

Census-designated place in Wisconsin, United States

Dellwood, Wisconsin
- Census-designated place
- Location in Adams County and the state of Wisconsin
- Coordinates: 43°59′03″N 89°56′19″W
- Country: United States
- State: Wisconsin
- County: Adams
- Town: Strongs Prairie

Area
  - Total: 5.364 sq mi (13.89 km^{2})
  - Land: 5.236 sq mi (13.56 km^{2})
  - Water: 0.128 sq mi (0.33 km^{2})
- Elevation: 912 ft (278 m)

Population (2020 census)
  - Total: 579
  - Density: 111/sq mi (42.7/km^{2})
- Time zone: UTC-6 (Central (CST))
  - Summer (DST): UTC-5 (CDT)
- ZIP code: 53927
- Area code: 608
- GNIS feature ID: 1563891

Dellwood (also known as Delwood) is an unincorporated census-designated place located in Adams County, Wisconsin, United States. Dellwood is west of Friendship, in the town of Strongs Prairie. As of the 2020 census, its population was 579, up from 563 at the 2010 census.

In the 1920s, a Chicago builder named Simon P. Linehan developed the area as a summer resort called “The Dellwood”. Through his development company, Linehan purchased about 3,000 acres along the Wisconsin River two miles south of what was then the unincorporated village of Holmsville. Holmsville residents soon changed its name to Dellwood.

== Demographics ==
As of the American Community Survey 5-year data in 2019, Dellwood had 525 people and 286 households. The racial makeup of the town was 99.4% White and 0.6% Native American.

In the town, the population was spread out, with 14% under the age of 18, 4.3% from 18 to 24, 11.4% from 25 to 44, 31% from 45 to 64, and 41% who were 65 years of age or older. The median age was 62.2 years. For every 100 females age 18 and over, there were 124 males.

The median income for a household in the town was $32,500, and the per capita income was $27,922. 17.1% of the population were below the poverty line, including 65% of those under age 18 and 4% of those age 65 or over.

== Education ==
It is in the Adams-Friendship Area School District.
