= Preston, Adams County, Wisconsin =

Preston, Wisconsin
- Town
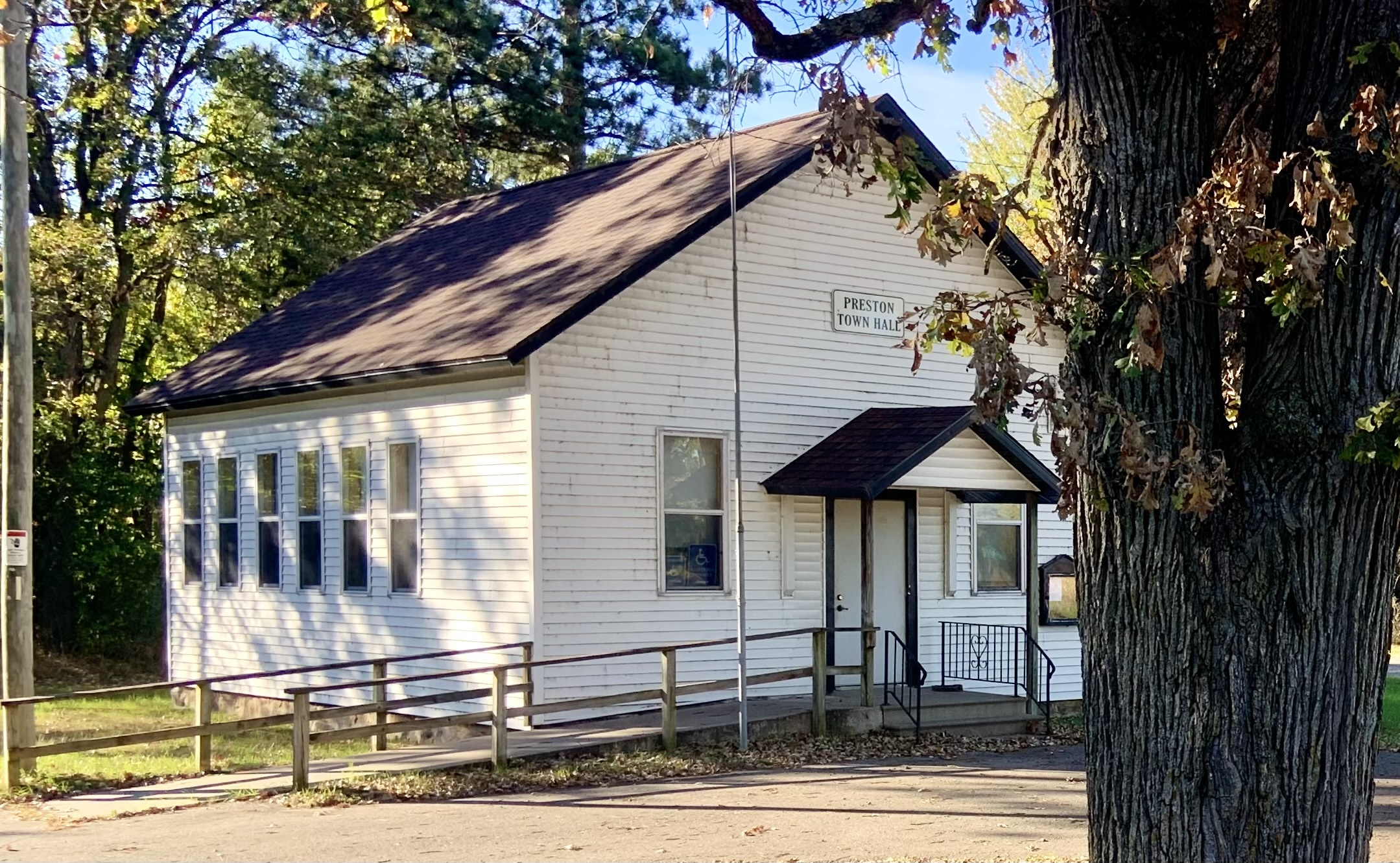
- Town hall

- Location in Adams County and the state of Wisconsin.
- Coordinates: 44°1′13″N 89°47′19″W
- Country: United States
- State: Wisconsin
- County: Adams

Area
  - Total: 35.8 sq mi (92.8 km^{2})
  - Land: 35.4 sq mi (91.6 km^{2})
  - Water: 0.50 sq mi (1.3 km^{2})
- Elevation: 968 ft (295 m)

Population (2020)
  - Total: 1,377
  - Density: 38.9/sq mi (15.0/km^{2})
- Time zone: UTC-6 (Central (CST))
  - Summer (DST): UTC-5 (CDT)
- Area code: 608
- FIPS code: 55-65450
- GNIS feature ID: 1583982
- Website: prestonadamscountywi.gov

Preston is a town in Adams County in the U.S. state of Wisconsin. The population was 1,377 at the 2020 census, slightly down from 1,393 at the 2010 census. The unincorporated community of Cottonville is located in the town. The ghost towns of Fordham and Roche a Cri were also located in the town.

== Geography ==
Preston is located at 44°1′20″N 89°46′30″W (44.022410, −89.775110).

According to the United States Census Bureau, the town has a total area of 35.8 square miles (92.8 km^{2}), of which 35.4 square miles (91.6 km^{2}) is land and 0.50 square miles (1.3 km^{2}), or 1.36%, is water.

== Demographics ==
Historical population
Census	Pop.	Note	%±
1870	161		—
1880	136		−15.5%
1890	209		53.7%
1900	377		80.4%
1910	323		−14.3%
1920	356		10.2%
1930	244		−31.5%
1940	279		14.3%
1950	244		−12.5%
1960	337		38.1%
1970	607		80.1%
1980	967		59.3%
1990	1,057		9.3%
2000	1,360		28.7%
2010	1,393		2.4%
2020	1,377		−1.1%
U.S. Decennial Census

As of the census of 2000, there were 1,360 people, 561 households, and 411 families residing in the town. The population density was 38.4 people per square mile (14.8 people/km^{2}). There were 960 housing units at an average density of 27.1 units per square mile (10.5 units/km^{2}). The racial makeup of the town was 97.72% White, 0.29% African American, 0.59% Native American, 0.37% Asian, 0.07% Pacific Islander, 0.29% from other races, and 0.66% from two or more races. Hispanic or Latino of any race were 1.99% of the population.

There were 561 households, out of which 26.4% had children under the age of 18 living with them, 64.7% were married couples living together, 5.5% had a female householder with no husband present, and 26.7% were non-families. 20.7% of all households were made up of individuals, and 10.5% had someone living alone who was 65 years of age or older. The average household size was 2.42 and the average family size was 2.78.

In the town, the population was spread out, with 22.9% under the age of 18, 4.2% from 18 to 24, 24.1% from 25 to 44, 28.8% from 45 to 64, and 20.1% who were 65 years of age or older. The median age was 44 years. For every 100 females, there were 109.2 males. For every 100 females age 18 and over, there were 104.5 males.

The median income for a household in the town was $33,491, and the median income for a family was $36,458. Males had a median income of $32,794 versus $21,413 for females. The per capita income for the town was $19,117. About 6.9% of families and 9.6% of the population were below the poverty line, including 11.9% of those under age 18 and 3.6% of those age 65 or over.

== Education ==
It is in the Adams-Friendship Area School District.
