= Easton (community), Wisconsin =

Census-designated place in Wisconsin, United States

Easton, Wisconsin
- Census-designated place
- Location within Wisconsin Location within the United States
- Coordinates: 43°50′17″N 89°48′24″W
- Country: United States
- State: Wisconsin
- County: Adams
- Town: Easton
- Elevation: 922 ft (281 m)

Population (2020)
  - Total: 86
- Time zone: UTC-6 (Central (CST))
  - Summer (DST): UTC-5 (CDT)
- Area code: 608
- GNIS feature ID: 1564392

Easton is an unincorporated community and census-designated place located in the town of Easton, Adams County, Wisconsin, United States. Easton is located on County Highway A and White Creek near Wisconsin Highway 13, 8.5 miles (13.7 km) south of Adams. Its population was 86 as of the 2020 United States census.
