= Iola (town), Wisconsin =

Town in Wisconsin, United States

Iola
- Town
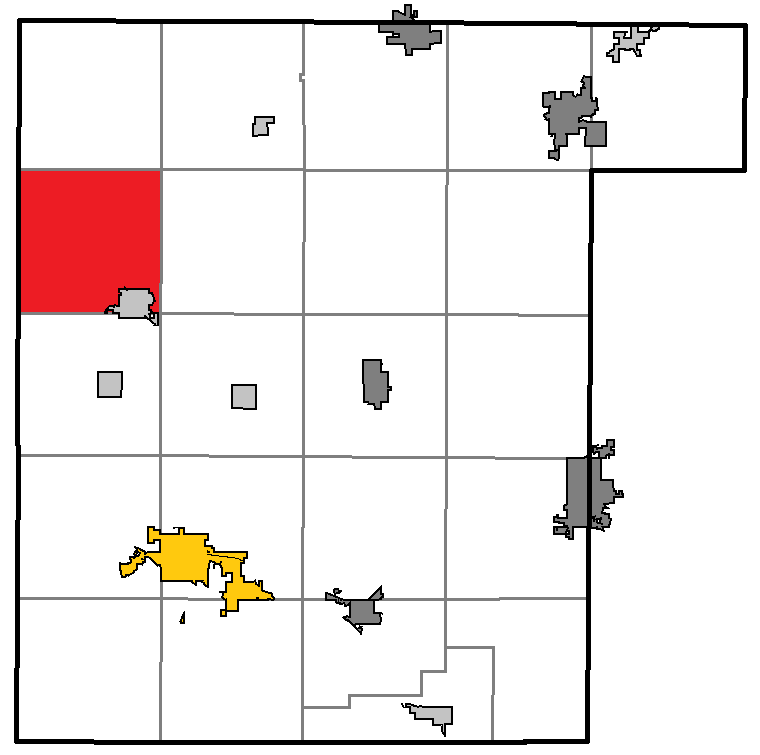
- Location of Iola, within Waupaca County

- Location within the state of Wisconsin
- Coordinates: 44°30′N 89°8′W
- Country: United States
- State: Wisconsin
- County: Waupaca

Area
  - Total: 34.5 sq mi (89.3 km^{2})
  - Land: 33.6 sq mi (87.1 km^{2})
  - Water: 0.85 sq mi (2.2 km^{2})

Population (2020)
  - Total: 938
  - Density: 27.9/sq mi (10.8/km^{2})
- Time zone: UTC−6 (Central (CST))
  - Summer (DST): UTC−5 (CDT)
- Area codes: 715 & 534
- Website: townofiola.com

Iola is a town in Waupaca County, Wisconsin, United States. The population was 938 at the 2020 census. The Village of Iola is located partially within the town. The ghost town of Petersville was also located in the town.

A car show is hosted every July in Iola. Over 120,000 people attend each year.

== Geography ==
According to the United States Census Bureau, the town has a total area of 34.5 square miles (89.3 km^{2}), of which 33.6 square miles (87.1 km^{2}) is land and 0.8 square miles (2.2 km^{2}; 2.44%) is water.

== Demographics ==
As of the census of 2000, there were 818 people, 328 households, and 245 families residing in the town. The population density was 24.3 people per square mile (9.4/km^{2}). There were 455 housing units at an average density of 13.5 per square mile (5.2/km^{2}). The racial makeup of the town was 98.53% White, 0.12% Native American, 0.12% Asian, 0.24% of other races, and 0.98% of two or more races. 1.10% of the population were Hispanic or Latino of any race.

There were 328 households, out of which 30.5% had children under the age of 18 living with them, 65.2% were married couples living together, 4.3% had a female householder with no husband present, and 25.3% were non-families. 21.3% of all households were made up of individuals, and 7.9% had someone living alone who was 65 years of age or older. The average household size was 2.49 and the average family size was 2.91.

In the town, the population was spread out, with 25.2% under the age of 18, 3.2% from 18 to 24, 28.2% from 25 to 44, 28.6% from 45 to 64, and 14.8% who were 65 years of age or older. The median age was 42 years. For every 100 females, there were 96.2 males. For every 100 females age 18 and over, there were 104.0 males.

The median income for a household in the town was $44,375, and the median income for a family was $52,031. Males had a median income of $39,773 versus $23,875 for females. The per capita income for the town was $19,952. None of the families and 1.7% of the population were living below the poverty line, including no people under eighteen and 8.9% of those over 64.
