= Leola, Wisconsin =

- Town
- Location in Adams County and the state of Wisconsin.

- Location within Wisconsin Location within the United States
- Coordinates: 44°12′11″N 89°38′52″W
- Country: United States
- State: Wisconsin
- County: Adams

Area
  - Total: 37.31 sq mi (96.62 km^{2})
  - Land: 37.28 sq mi (96.55 km^{2})
  - Water: 0.027 sq mi (0.07 km^{2})
- Elevation: 1,033 ft (315 m)

Population (2020)
  - Total: 287
  - Density: 7.70/sq mi (2.97/km^{2})
- Time zone: UTC-6 (Central (CST))
  - Summer (DST): UTC-5 (CDT)
- Area code: 608
- FIPS code: 55-43425
- GNIS feature ID: 1583543
- Website: leolawi.gov

Leola is a town in Adams County in the U.S. state of Wisconsin. The population was 287 at the 2020 census, down from 308 at the 2010 census.

== Geography ==
According to the United States Census Bureau, the town has a total area of 37.3 square miles (96.6 km^{2}), of which 0.027 square miles (0.07 km^{2}), or 0.08%, is water.

== Demographics ==
Historical population
Census	Pop.	Note	%±
1870	185		—
1880	238		28.6%
1890	240		0.8%
1900	384		60.0%
1910	365		−4.9%
1920	315		−13.7%
1930	255		−19.0%
1940	244		−4.3%
1950	206		−15.6%
1960	207		0.5%
1970	184		−11.1%
1980	237		28.8%
1990	217		−8.4%
2000	265		22.1%
2010	308		16.2%
2020	287		−6.8%
U.S. Decennial Census

At the 2020 census, there were 287 people, 130 households and 76 families residing in the town. The population density was 7.7 people per square mile (3.0 people/km^{2}). There were 167 housing units at an average density of 4.5 units per square mile (1.7 units/km^{2}). The racial makeup was 95.1% White, 0.3% African American, 0.3% Asian, 0.3% from other races. Hispanic or Latino of any race were 1% of the population.

There were 130 households, of which 15.7% had children under the age of 18 living with them, 52.1% were married couples living together, 8.4% had a female householder with no spouse present. 33.6% of all households were made up of individuals, and 10.9% had someone living alone who was 65 years of age or older.

20.5% of the population were under the age of 19, 2.4% from 20 to 24, 20.5% from 25 to 44, 28.9% from 45 to 64, and 19.4% who were 65 years of age or older. The median age was 48 years.

The median household income was $53,125 and the median family income was $74,583. About 7.7% of the population were below the poverty line, including 9.4% of those under the age of eighteen and 6.9% of those 65 or over.

== Education ==
It is in the Tri-County Area School District.
