= Lake, Price County, Wisconsin =

Lake, Wisconsin
- Town
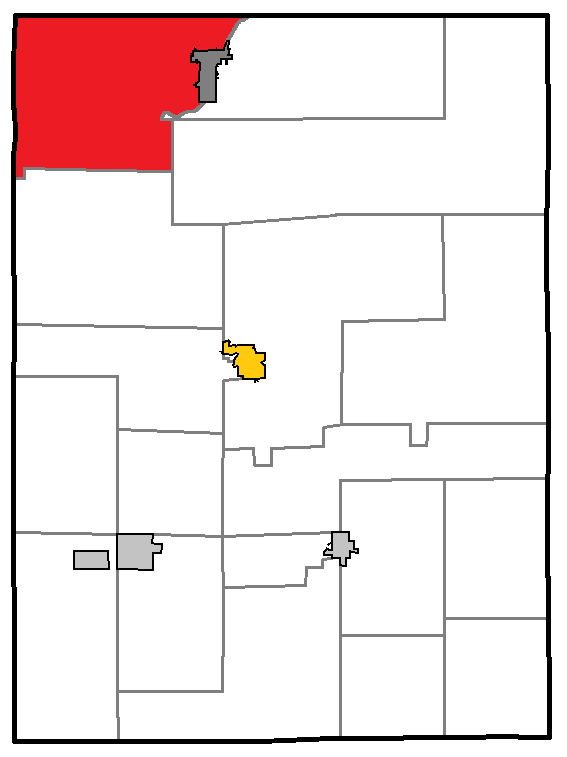
- Location of Lake, within Price County, Wisconsin
- Coordinates: 45°55′47″N 90°32′46″W
- Country: United States
- State: Wisconsin
- County: Price

Area
  - Total: 92.2 sq mi (238.9 km^{2})
  - Land: 88.6 sq mi (229.5 km^{2})
  - Water: 3.6 sq mi (9.3 km^{2})
- Elevation: 1,480 ft (451 m)

Population (2020)
  - Total: 1,106
  - Density: 12.48/sq mi (4.819/km^{2})
- Time zone: UTC-6 (Central (CST))
  - Summer (DST): UTC-5 (CDT)
- Area codes: 715 & 534
- FIPS code: 55-41150
- GNIS feature ID: 1583509
- Website: https://www.townoflake.wi.gov/

Lake is a town in Price County, Wisconsin, United States. The population was 1,106 at the 2020 census. The unincorporated community of Kennedy is located in the town. The ghost town of Kaiser was also located in the town.

== Geography ==
According to the United States Census Bureau, the town has a total area of 92.2 square miles (238.8 km^{2}), of which 88.6 square miles (229.6 km^{2}) is land and 3.6 square miles (9.3 km^{2}) (3.89%) is water.

== Demographics ==
As of the census of 2000, there were 1,319 people, 531 households, and 395 families residing in the town. The population density was 14.9 people per square mile (5.7/km^{2}). There were 843 housing units at an average density of 9.5 per square mile (3.7/km^{2}). The racial makeup of the town was 98.33% White, 0.15% African American, 0.23% Native American, 0.23% Asian, 0.15% Pacific Islander, 0.08% from other races, and 0.83% from two or more races. Hispanic or Latino people of any race were 0.30% of the population.

There were 531 households, out of which 29.8% had children under the age of 18 living with them, 66.1% were married couples living together, 4.5% had a female householder with no husband present, and 25.6% were non-families. 21.7% of all households were made up of individuals, and 10.5% had someone living alone who was 65 years of age or older. The average household size was 2.48 and the average family size was 2.92.

In the town, the population was spread out, with 23.8% under the age of 18, 3.8% from 18 to 24, 26.2% from 25 to 44, 29.3% from 45 to 64, and 16.9% who were 65 years of age or older. The median age was 43 years. For every 100 females, there were 103.5 males. For every 100 females age 18 and over, there were 103.9 males.

The median income for a household in the town was $39,783, and the median income for a family was $45,982. Males had a median income of $36,583 versus $18,839 for females. The per capita income for the town was $19,728. About 3.6% of families and 5.9% of the population were below the poverty line, including 4.6% of those under age 18 and 12.3% of those age 65 or over.
