= Cottonville, Wisconsin =

- Unincorporated community
- Location within Wisconsin Location within the United States
- Coordinates: 44°03′30″N 89°48′23″W
- Country: United States
- State: Wisconsin
- County: Adams
- Town: Preston
- Elevation: 965 ft (294 m)
- Time zone: UTC-6 (Central (CST))
  - Summer (DST): UTC-5 (CDT)
- Area code: 608
- GNIS feature ID: 1837579

Cottonville is an unincorporated community located in the town of Preston, Adams County, Wisconsin, United States. Cottonville is located on Wisconsin Highway 13 and Big Roche Cri Creek, 6 miles (9.7 km) north of Friendship. Originally named Roche-A-Cree, Cottonville was named after Julius Cotton, who built a dam and sawmill on Big Roche-a-Cri Creek in the 1850s.
