= Lake Camelot, Wisconsin =

Census-designated place in Wisconsin, United States

- Census-designated place
- Location in Adams County and the state of Wisconsin.
- Coordinates: 44°13′03″N 89°45′39″W
- Country: United States
- State: Wisconsin
- County: Adams
- Town: Rome

Area
  - Total: 4.391 sq mi (11.37 km^{2})
  - Land: 3.774 sq mi (9.77 km^{2})
  - Water: 0.617 sq mi (1.60 km^{2})
- Elevation: 1,020 ft (310 m)

Population (2020)
  - Total: 895
  - Density: 237/sq mi (91.6/km^{2})
- Time zone: UTC-6 (Central (CST))
  - Summer (DST): UTC-5 (CDT)
- Area code: 608
- GNIS feature ID: 2586516

Lake Camelot is a census-designated place in the town of Rome, Adams County, Wisconsin, United States. Its population was 895 at the 2020 census, up from 826 at the 2010 census.

== Education ==
It is in the Nekoosa School District.
