= Kennedy, Wisconsin =

- Unincorporated community
- Location within Wisconsin Location within the United States
- Coordinates: 45°54′37″N 90°39′27″W
- Country: United States
- State: Wisconsin
- County: Price
- Elevation: 1,473 ft (449 m)
- Time zone: UTC-6 (Central (CST))
  - Summer (DST): UTC-5 (CDT)
- Area codes: 715 & 534
- GNIS feature ID: 1579574

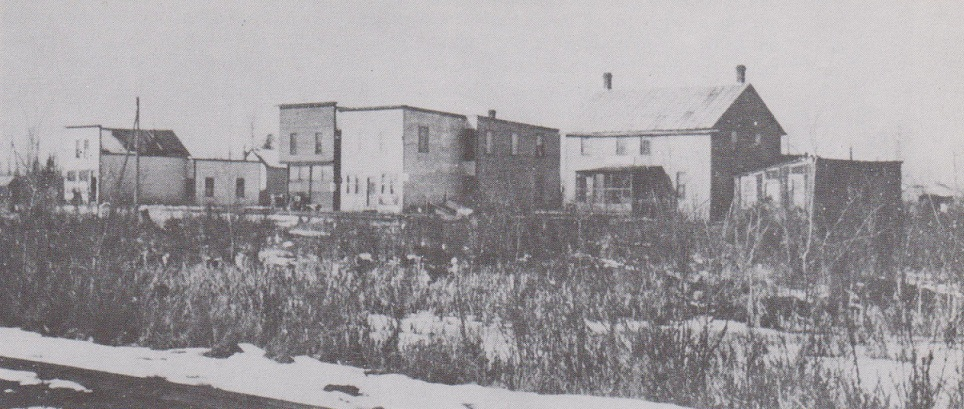
Downtown Kennedy faced the Omaha Railroad tracks, in the foreground of this photo. Businesses included, from left to right, are Jack Welsh's saloon and restaurant, Oscar Joyce's Saloon, Bricco's General Store, post office and Branshaw's hotel.

Kennedy is an unincorporated community located in the town of Lake, Price County, Wisconsin, United States. Once a busy sawmill community during the logging boom, Kennedy is now a ghost town.

== History ==
The village of Kennedy was platted in 1908, in an area near the Price-Sawyer County border, adjacent to the Omaha Railway tracks. It may have been named after Pat Kennedy, a Fifield pioneer who kept a tavern in the new village.

The land where Kennedy was located was originally owned by Cornell University, who had been given the property through a university land grant. Cornell sold the property to the Sage Land Company, which owned much property in nearby Park Falls. The Sage Company later sold the land to Williard Walther of the Dells Lumber and Pulp Company, for $600. The Dells Lumber and Puld Company was involved in paper making and was based in Eau Claire. The company built a headquarters and office west of Kennedy. Spur lines were built from Kennedy to seven logging camps to the north, near the Ashland County border. In 1908, Willard Walther developed the plat for the new community.

The village grew as the logging operations drew more workers, and the cut-over land was settled. A log schoolhouse was the first building built, located on the west side of the settlement. Taverns, a boarding house, general store, and a train station also soon appeared. A frame schoolhouse and post office were built in 1911. In time, Kennedy had some basic businesses, including a hotel.

Kennedy was the terminus of the Omaha Railway Line for two years, and settlers boarded the train there to reach Rice Lake. In 1916, a road was built that stretched east to Kaiser, another sawmill town. About twenty-five families lived in Kennedy during the 1920s, and thirty students attended the school.

In the mid-1920s, the Dells Company moved its headquarters 2.5 miles farther away from Kennedy, to a community named Delco. Delco was located in a clearing in the woods. A post office was established there for the mill workers, loggers and trainmen who ate and slept at the boarding house there. Delco had an office, a warehouse, a blacksmith shop, and a horse barn. It existed only to handle wood, and the post office was only open between 1927 and 1929.

The Dells Company continued logging until 1933. Virtually all other logging activities in Kennedy came to a halt in 1935.

Edith Bricco, Laura Perry, and Edith Rozell followed Stanley Berg as postmasters until 1938, when the post office was discontinued. The school was closed in 1939 and the village of Kennedy was all but abandoned. All but four of the buildings in the village were taken down, burned, or decayed until they collapsed. The railroad tracks were removed in 1964.
