= Monroe, Adams County, Wisconsin =

Monroe, Wisconsin
- Town
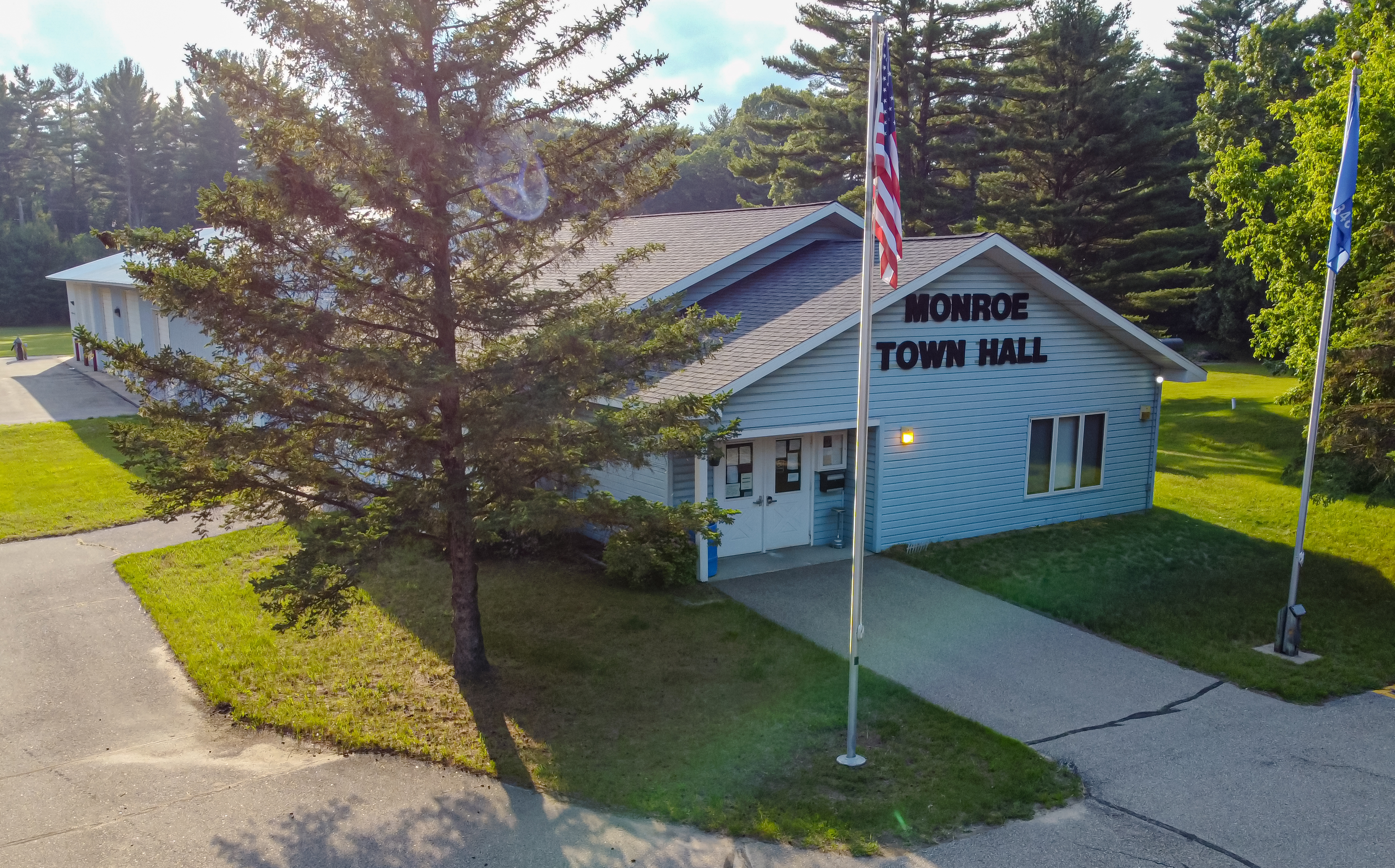
- Town Hall

- Location in Adams County and the state of Wisconsin.
- Coordinates: 44°7′18″N 89°55′54″W
- Country: United States
- State: Wisconsin
- County: Adams

Area
  - Total: 38.5 sq mi (99.6 km^{2})
  - Land: 21.9 sq mi (56.7 km^{2})
  - Water: 16.6 sq mi (42.9 km^{2})
- Elevation: 928 ft (283 m)

Population (2020)
  - Total: 391
  - Density: 17.9/sq mi (6.90/km^{2})
- Time zone: UTC-6 (Central (CST))
  - Summer (DST): UTC-5 (CDT)
- Area code: 608
- FIPS code: 55-53725
- GNIS feature ID: 1583739
- Website: townofmonroeadamscowi.com

There is another Town of Monroe and the City of Monroe in Green County, Wisconsin.

Monroe is a town in Adams County in the U.S. state of Wisconsin. The population was 391 as of the 2020 census, slightly down from 398 as of the 2010 census. The unincorporated community of Monroe Center is located in the town.

== Geography ==
Monroe is located in northwestern Adams County, along Petenwell Lake, a large reservoir on the Wisconsin River. According to the United States Census Bureau, the town has a total area of 38.5 square miles (99.6 km^{2}), of which 21.9 square miles (56.7 km^{2}) is land and 16.6 square miles (42.9 km^{2}), or 43.11%, is water.

== Demographics ==
Historical population
Census	Pop.	Note	%±
1870	416		—
1880	448		7.7%
1890	462		3.1%
1900	595		28.8%
1910	487		−18.2%
1920	419		−14.0%
1930	308		−26.5%
1940	279		−9.4%
1950	209		−25.1%
1960	196		−6.2%
1970	252		28.6%
1980	288		14.3%
1990	302		4.9%
2000	363		20.2%
2010	398		9.6%
2020	391		−1.8%
U.S. Decennial Census

As of the census of 2000, there were 363 people, 168 households, and 127 families residing in the town. The population density was 16.6 people per square mile (6.4 people/km^{2}). There were 402 housing units at an average density of 18.4 units per square mile (7.1 units/km^{2}). The racial makeup of the town was 99.45% White, 0.28% Native American and 0.28% Asian. Hispanic or Latino of any race were 0.55% of the population.

There were 168 households, out of which 15.5% had children under the age of 18 living with them, 68.5% were married couples living together, 3.0% had a female householder with no husband present, and 24.4% were non-families. 23.2% of all households were made up of individuals, and 9.5% had someone living alone who was 65 years of age or older. The average household size was 2.16 and the average family size was 2.48.

In the town, the population was spread out, with 14.3% under the age of 18, 5.0% from 18 to 24, 21.8% from 25 to 44, 35.0% from 45 to 64, and 24.0% who were 65 years of age or older. The median age was 53 years. For every 100 females, there were 96.2 males. For every 100 females age 18 and over, there were 100.6 males.

The median income for a household in the town was $34,500, and the median income for a family was $37,250. Males had a median income of $36,806 versus $25,893 for females. The per capita income for the town was $19,970. About 4.8% of families and 7.3% of the population were below the poverty line, including 12.7% of those under age 18 and 3.7% of those age 65 or over.

== Education ==
It is in the Adams-Friendship Area School District.
