= Lake Arrowhead, Wisconsin =

Census-designated place in Wisconsin, United States

- Census-designated place
- Location in Adams County and the state of Wisconsin.
- Coordinates: 44°12′13″N 89°50′41″W
- Country: United States
- State: Wisconsin
- County: Adams
- Town: Rome

Area
  - Total: 5.502 sq mi (14.25 km^{2})
  - Land: 5.032 sq mi (13.03 km^{2})
  - Water: 0.470 sq mi (1.22 km^{2})
- Elevation: 988 ft (301 m)

Population (2020)
  - Total: 946
  - Density: 188/sq mi (72.6/km^{2})
- Time zone: UTC-6 (Central (CST))
  - Summer (DST): UTC-5 (CDT)
- Area code: 608
- GNIS feature ID: 2586515

Lake Arrowhead is a census-designated place in the town of Rome, Adams County, Wisconsin, United States. Its population was 946 at the 2020 census, up from 838 at the 2010 census.

== Education ==
It is in the Nekoosa School District.
