= Lincoln, Adams County, Wisconsin =

Town of Lincoln
- Town
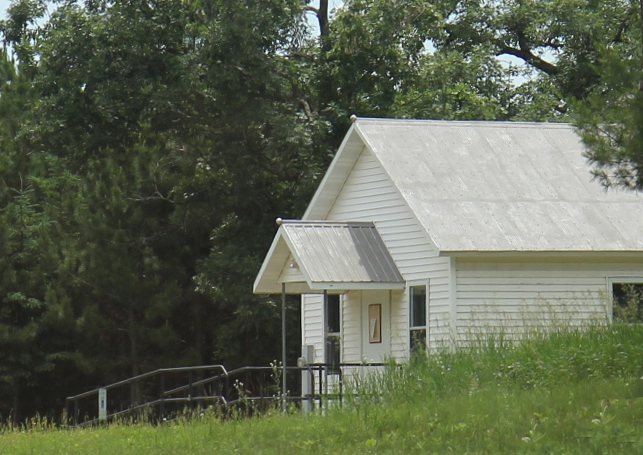
- Town hall

- Location in Adams County and the state of Wisconsin.
- Coordinates: 43°56′35″N 89°40′6″W
- Country: United States
- State: Wisconsin
- County: Adams

Area
  - Total: 36.2 sq mi (93.7 km^{2})
  - Land: 36.1 sq mi (93.5 km^{2})
  - Water: 0.039 sq mi (0.1 km^{2})
- Elevation: 1,030 ft (314 m)

Population (2020)
  - Total: 320
  - Density: 8.9/sq mi (3.4/km^{2})
- Time zone: UTC-6 (Central (CST))
  - Summer (DST): UTC-5 (CDT)
- Area code: 608
- FIPS code: 55-44250
- GNIS feature ID: 1583560
- Website: lincolnadamscountywi.gov

The Town of Lincoln is located in Adams County in the U.S. state of Wisconsin. The population was 320 at the 2020 census, up from 296 at the 2010 census. The ghost town of Springbluff was located in the town.

== Geography ==
According to the United States Census Bureau, the town has a total area of 36.2 square miles (93.7 km^{2}), of which 36.1 square miles (93.5 km^{2}) is land and 0.039 square miles (0.1 km^{2}), or 0.15%, is water.

== Demographics ==
Historical population
Census	Pop.	Note	%±
1870	438		—
1880	434		−0.9%
1890	440		1.4%
1900	479		8.9%
1910	543		13.4%
1920	419		−22.8%
1930	329		−21.5%
1940	381		15.8%
1950	365		−4.2%
1960	283		−22.5%
1970	184		−35.0%
1980	237		28.8%
1990	217		−8.4%
2000	311		43.3%
2010	296		−4.8%
2020	320		8.1%
U.S. Decennial Census

As of the census of 2000, there were 311 people, 129 households, and 86 families residing in the town. The population density was 8.6 people per square mile (3.3 people/km^{2}). There were 210 housing units at an average density of 5.8 units per square mile (2.2 units/km^{2}). The racial makeup of the town was 97.75% White, 0.32% African American, and 1.93% from two or more races. Hispanic or Latino of any race were 2.57% of the population.

There were 129 households, out of which 23.3% had children under the age of 18 living with them, 55.0% were married couples living together, 7.8% had a female householder with no husband present, and 33.3% were non-families. 26.4% of all households were made up of individuals, and 10.1% had someone living alone who was 65 years of age or older. The average household size was 2.41 and the average family size was 2.95.

In the town, the population was spread out, with 18.6% under the age of 18, 7.4% from 18 to 24, 24.1% from 25 to 44, 31.2% from 45 to 64, and 18.6% who were 65 years of age or older. The median age was 45 years. For every 100 females, there were 120.6 males. For every 100 females age 18 and over, there were 109.1 males.

The median income for a household in the town was $29,107, and the median income for a family was $32,813. Males had a median income of $30,500 versus $25,625 for females. The per capita income for the town was $15,484. About 13.6% of families and 22.1% of the population were below the poverty line, including 26.7% of those under age 18 and 16.7% of those age 65 or over.

== Education ==
It is in the Adams-Friendship Area School District.
