= List of Wisconsin locations by per capita income =

Wisconsin has the twenty-first highest income among states in the United States of America, with a per capita income of $26,624 (2010). See also List of U.S. states by income.

== Wisconsin counties ranked by per capita income ==
Note: Data are from the 2010 United States Census and the 2006-2010 American Community Survey 5-Year Estimates.

Rank	County	Per capita income	Median household income	Median family income	Population	Number of households
1	Ozaukee	$39,778	$74,996	$90,133	86,395	34,228
2	Waukesha	$36,752	$75,064	$89,799	389,891	152,663
3	Dane	$32,392	$60,519	$80,995	488,073	203,750
4	St. Croix	$31,377	$67,446	$78,646	84,345	31,799
5	Washington	$30,580	$64,434	$77,154	131,887	51,605
6	Door	$29,154	$47,775	$60,139	27,785	12,548
7	Oneida	$28,085	$45,857	$56,092	35,998	16,003
8	Calumet	$27,567	$61,685	$72,208	48,971	18,575
	United States	$27,334	$51,914	$62,982	308,745,538	116,716,292
9	Vilas	$27,128	$41,631	$52,777	21,430	9,658
10	Columbia	$26,993	$55,910	$65,713	56,833	22,735
11	Outagamie	$26,965	$55,914	$69,331	176,695	69,648
12	Brown	$26,816	$52,553	$66,024	248,007	98,383
13	Walworth	$26,769	$54,487	$67,308	102,228	39,699
14	Green	$26,721	$53,088	$64,092	36,842	14,866
	Wisconsin	$26,624	$51,598	$64,869	5,686,986	2,279,768
15	Winnebago	$26,383	$50,974	$65,646	166,994	67,875
16	Racine	$26,321	$53,855	$65,200	195,408	75,651
17	Pierce	$26,313	$60,181	$74,419	41,019	15,002
18	Kenosha	$26,168	$54,430	$67,311	166,426	62,650
19	Marathon	$25,893	$53,471	$65,566	134,063	53,176
20	Sauk	$25,452	$50,390	$62,196	61,976	25,192
21	Fond du Lac	$25,360	$51,549	$64,173	101,633	40,697
22	Manitowoc	$25,161	$49,354	$61,849	81,442	34,013
23	Iowa	$25,156	$54,737	$67,090	23,687	9,547
24	Sheboygan	$24,976	$51,127	$65,301	115,507	46,390
25	Green Lake	$24,973	$47,624	$61,232	19,051	7,919
26	La Crosse	$24,917	$49,328	$65,882	114,638	46,137
27	Wood	$24,893	$47,204	$58,294	74,749	31,598
28	Portage	$24,873	$51,456	$66,262	70,019	27,814
29	Eau Claire	$24,826	$45,846	$64,507	98,736	39,493
30	Jefferson	$24,729	$54,769	$65,684	83,686	32,117
31	Polk	$24,704	$49,806	$59,246	44,205	18,004
32	Kewaunee	$24,574	$54,152	$63,861	20,574	8,239
33	Douglas	$24,552	$43,127	$56,723	44,159	18,555
34	Oconto	$24,521	$46,633	$55,367	37,660	15,415
35	Pepin	$24,233	$48,446	$57,736	7,469	3,051
36	Bayfield	$24,028	$43,176	$53,882	15,014	6,686
37	Chippewa	$23,952	$48,672	$58,963	62,415	24,410
38	Rock	$23,926	$49,716	$61,165	160,331	62,905
39	Lincoln	$23,793	$46,625	$59,195	28,743	12,094
40	Milwaukee	$23,740	$43,215	$54,539	947,735	383,591
41	Dodge	$23,663	$52,571	$62,341	88,759	33,840
42	Sawyer	$23,527	$37,091	$46,134	16,557	7,038
43	Waupaca	$23,293	$46,876	$58,613	52,410	21,387
44	Trempealeau	$23,224	$46,582	$57,432	28,816	11,524
45	Washburn	$23,221	$41,641	$49,865	15,911	6,916
46	Price	$23,125	$41,026	$53,697	14,159	6,329
47	Monroe	$23,052	$47,333	$58,666	44,673	17,376
48	Juneau	$23,026	$45,664	$54,059	26,664	10,527
49	Marinette	$22,999	$39,698	$50,243	41,749	17,974
50	Marquette	$22,895	$45,012	$53,408	15,404	6,571
51	Burnett	$22,767	$39,626	$47,923	15,457	6,807
52	Barron	$22,666	$42,601	$52,189	45,870	19,173
53	Taylor	$22,639	$44,489	$55,182	20,689	8,388
54	Buffalo	$22,579	$45,302	$55,095	13,587	5,708
55	Shawano	$22,539	$45,841	$53,337	41,949	17,019
56	Lafayette	$22,026	$48,114	$58,031	16,836	6,609
57	Langlade	$22,025	$41,034	$49,897	19,977	8,587
58	Waushara	$22,002	$42,540	$50,189	24,496	9,949
59	Adams	$21,917	$39,885	$45,821	20,875	8,666
60	Dunn	$21,624	$48,376	$60,984	43,857	16,373
61	Vernon	$21,618	$43,632	$53,813	29,773	11,616
62	Crawford	$21,346	$39,486	$51,466	16,644	6,812
63	Richland	$21,301	$43,900	$54,186	18,021	7,349
64	Iron	$21,286	$35,618	$45,851	5,916	2,822
65	Jackson	$20,778	$43,191	$51,885	20,449	7,843
66	Grant	$20,758	$43,889	$54,743	51,208	19,396
67	Forest	$20,578	$37,627	$44,296	9,304	3,836
68	Rusk	$20,573	$38,352	$48,176	14,755	6,232
69	Florence	$20,283	$40,180	$44,940	4,423	1,987
70	Clark	$19,797	$42,777	$51,441	34,690	12,679
71	Ashland	$19,730	$38,111	$44,365	16,157	6,736
72	Menominee	$14,794	$31,076	$37,176	4,232	1,318
