= Richfield, Adams County, Wisconsin =

Richfield, Wisconsin
- Town
- Location in Adams County and the state of Wisconsin.
- Coordinates: 44°0′59″N 89°38′54″W
- Country: United States
- State: Wisconsin
- County: Adams

Area
  - Total: 35.5 sq mi (92.0 km^{2})
  - Land: 35.5 sq mi (92.0 km^{2})
  - Water: 0 sq mi (0.0 km^{2})
- Elevation: 1,020 ft (311 m)

Population (2020)
  - Total: 138
  - Density: 3.88/sq mi (1.50/km^{2})
- Time zone: UTC-6 (Central (CST))
  - Summer (DST): UTC-5 (CDT)
- Area code: 608
- FIPS code: 55-67425
- GNIS feature ID: 1584021
- Website: richfieldadamscowi.gov

Richfield is a town in Adams County in the U.S. state of Wisconsin. The population was 138 at the 2020 census, down from 158 at the 2010 census. The ghost town of Pilot Knob was located in the town.

== Geography ==
Richfield is located at 44°1′45″N 89°39′36″W (44.029410, −89.660180).

According to the United States Census Bureau, the town has a total area of 35.5 square miles (92.0 km^{2}), all land.

== Demographics ==
Historical population
Census	Pop.	Note	%±
1870	266		—
1880	308		15.8%
1890	335		8.8%
1900	417		24.5%
1910	424		1.7%
1920	395		−6.8%
1930	240		−39.2%
1940	261		8.8%
1950	206		−21.1%
1960	165		−19.9%
1970	165		0.0%
1980	183		10.9%
1990	159		−13.1%
2000	144		−9.4%
2010	158		9.7%
2020	138		−12.7%
U.S. Decennial Census

As of the census of 2000, there were 144 people, 62 households, and 44 families residing in the town. The population density was 4.1 people per square mile (1.6 people/km^{2}). There were 103 housing units at an average density of 2.9 units per square mile (1.1 units/km^{2}). The racial makeup of the town was 99.31% White, and 0.69% from two or more races.

There were 62 households, out of which 16.1% had children under the age of 18 living with them, 64.5% were married couples living together, 3.2% had a female householder with no husband present, and 29.0% were non-families. 21.0% of all households were made up of individuals, and 12.9% had someone living alone who was 65 years of age or older. The average household size was 2.32 and the average family size was 2.64.

In the town, the population was spread out, with 18.8% under the age of 18, 5.6% from 18 to 24, 20.1% from 25 to 44, 34.0% from 45 to 64, and 21.5% who were 65 years of age or older. The median age was 48 years. For every 100 females, there were 132.3 males. For every 100 females age 18 and over, there were 120.8 males.

The median income for a household in the town was $34,792, and the median income for a family was $34,792. Males had a median income of $26,250 versus $19,375 for females. The per capita income for the town was $23,333. There were 14.0% of families and 17.1% of the population living below the poverty line, including 35.0% of under eighteens and 14.3% of those over 64.

== Education ==
It is in the Adams-Friendship Area School District.
