= Harmon, Wisconsin =

- Ghost town
- Location within Wisconsin
- Coordinates: 46°04′04″N 91°40′06″W
- Country: United States
- State: Wisconsin
- County: Washburn
- Elevation: 1,191 ft (363 m)
- GNIS feature ID: 1833847

Harmon is a ghost town in the town of Stinnett, Washburn County, Wisconsin, United States. Harmon was located on what is now the Canadian National Railway 7.8 miles (12.6 km) east-southeast of Minong. The town is said to be named after the well known politician from Newtown, Thomas Harmon Jr. The town was marked on USGS maps as late as 1947.
