= Monroe Center, Wisconsin =

- Unincorporated community
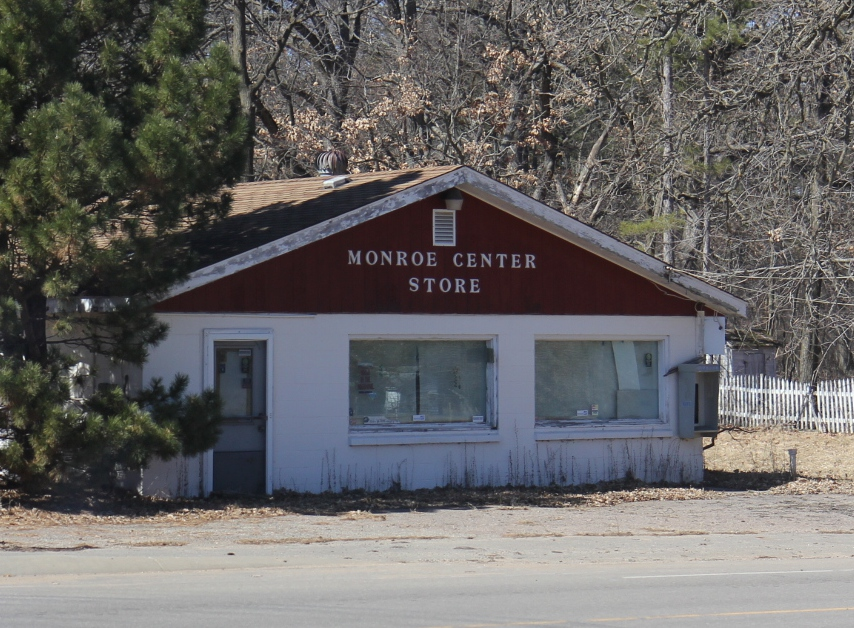
- The Monroe Center Store

- Location within Wisconsin Location within the United States
- Coordinates: 44°06′43″N 89°56′22″W
- Country: United States
- State: Wisconsin
- County: Adams
- Town: Monroe
- Elevation: 945 ft (288 m)
- Time zone: UTC-6 (Central (CST))
  - Summer (DST): UTC-5 (CDT)
- Area code: 608
- GNIS feature ID: 1569658

Monroe Center is an unincorporated community located in the town of Monroe, Adams County, Wisconsin, United States. Monroe Center is located at the junction of County Highways C and Z, 11.5 miles (18.5 km) north-northwest of Friendship.
