= Stinnett, Wisconsin =

Town in Wisconsin, United States

- Town
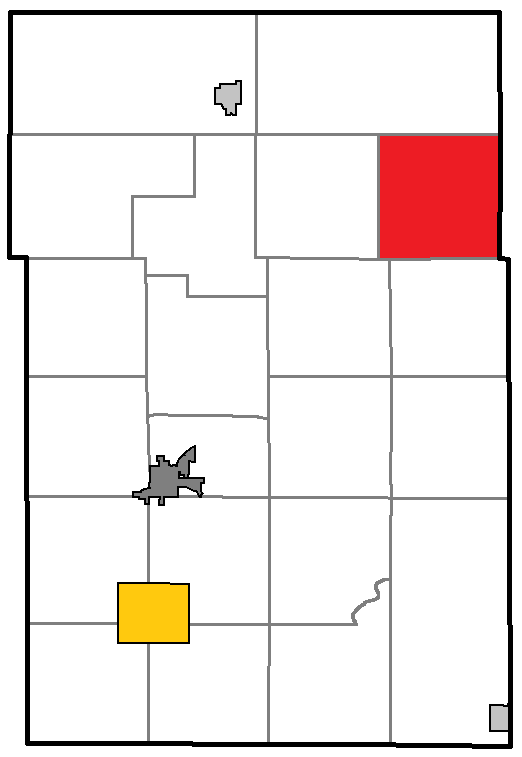
- Location of Stinnett, within Washburn County
- Coordinates: 46°1′33″N 91°36′23″W
- Country: United States
- State: Wisconsin
- County: Washburn

Area
  - Total: 35.6 sq mi (92.3 km^{2})
  - Land: 34.4 sq mi (89.2 km^{2})
  - Water: 1.2 sq mi (3.2 km^{2})
- Elevation: 1,175 ft (358 m)

Population (2020)
  - Total: 207
  - Density: 6.01/sq mi (2.32/km^{2})
- Time zone: UTC-6 (Central (CST))
  - Summer (DST): UTC-5 (CDT)
- Area codes: 715 & 534
- FIPS code: 55-77350
- GNIS feature ID: 1584225
- Website: https://www.townofstinnett.com/

Stinnett is a town in Washburn County, Wisconsin, United States. The population was 207 at the 2020 census. The unincorporated community of Stanberry is located in the town, situated 7 miles (11 km) west of Hayward on County Highway M. The ghost town of Harmon was located in the town.

== Geography ==
According to the United States Census Bureau, the town has a total area of 35.7 square miles (92.3 km^{2}), of which 34.4 square miles (89.2 km^{2}) is land and 1.2 square miles (3.2 km^{2}) (3.42%) is water.

== Demographics ==
As of the census of 2000, there were 263 people, 100 households, and 69 families residing in the town. The population density was 7.6 people per square mile (2.9/km^{2}). There were 133 housing units at an average density of 3.9 per square mile (1.5/km^{2}). The racial makeup of the town was 90.87% White, 2.28% Native American, 0.38% from other races, and 6.46% from two or more races. Hispanic or Latino people of any race were 5.32% of the population.

There were 100 households, out of which 36.0% had children under the age of 18 living with them, 52% were married couples living together, 10% had a female householder with no husband present, and 31% were non-families. 27% of all households were made up of individuals, and 12% had someone living alone who was 65 years of age or older. The average household size was 2.63 and the average family size was 3.13.

In the town, the population was spread out, with 29.7% under the age of 18, 8% from 18 to 24, 33.1% from 25 to 44, 18.6% from 45 to 64, and 10.6% who were 65 years of age or older. The median age was 36 years. For every 100 females, there were 102.3 males. For every 100 females age 18 and over, there were 98.9 males.

The median income for a household in the town was $27,750, and the median income for a family was $36,250. Males had a median income of $25,417 versus $16,607 for females. The per capita income for the town was $13,169. None of the families and 2.8% of the population were living below the poverty line, including none of those under 18 and 8.3% of those over 64.
