= Dirty Hollow, Wisconsin =

Dirty Hollow
- Former Village
- Location within the state of Wisconsin
- Coordinates: 42°57′48″N 90°7′52″W
- Country: United States
- State: Wisconsin
- County: Iowa
- Time zone: UTC-6 (Central (CST))
  - Summer (DST): UTC-5 (CDT)

Dirty Hollow was a former village in the present day City of Dodgeville, Wisconsin, United States. Although once larger than the city, Dirty Hollow and neighboring Minersville were annexed along with the village of Dodgeville to form the City of Dodgeville.

== History ==
In the heart of Iowa County, Wisconsin there were once three villages located blocks away from each other. They consisted of: Dirty Hollow, Minersville, and Dodgeville. Dirty Hollow was a thriving settlement with three hotels, grocery stores, and even an opera house. However, after the long dispute over the county seat between Dodgeville and Mineral Point was settled and the new courthouse was built just a block away, causing a halt to the growth of Dirty Hollow. The three villages were then annexed into the growing settlement of Dodgeville.
