= Petersville, Wisconsin =

- Ghost town
- Location within Wisconsin
- Coordinates: 44°32′18″N 89°11′00″W
- Country: United States
- State: Wisconsin
- County: Waupaca
- Elevation: 988 ft (301 m)
- GNIS feature ID: 1850537

Petersville (also Petersonville) is a ghost town in the town of Iola, Waupaca County, Wisconsin, United States.
