= Davis Corners, Wisconsin =

- Unincorporated community
- Location within Wisconsin Location within the United States
- Coordinates: 43.750°N 89.699°W
- Country: United States
- State: Wisconsin
- County: Adams
- Elevation: 1,047 ft (319 m)
- Time zone: UTC-6 (Central (CST))
  - Summer (DST): UTC-5 (CDT)
- Area code: 608
- GNIS feature ID: 1563731

Davis Corners is an unincorporated community located in Adams County, Wisconsin, United States. The community was named for William A. Davis, who established the post office in May 1855.
