= Rome, Adams County, Wisconsin =

Town of Rome
- Town
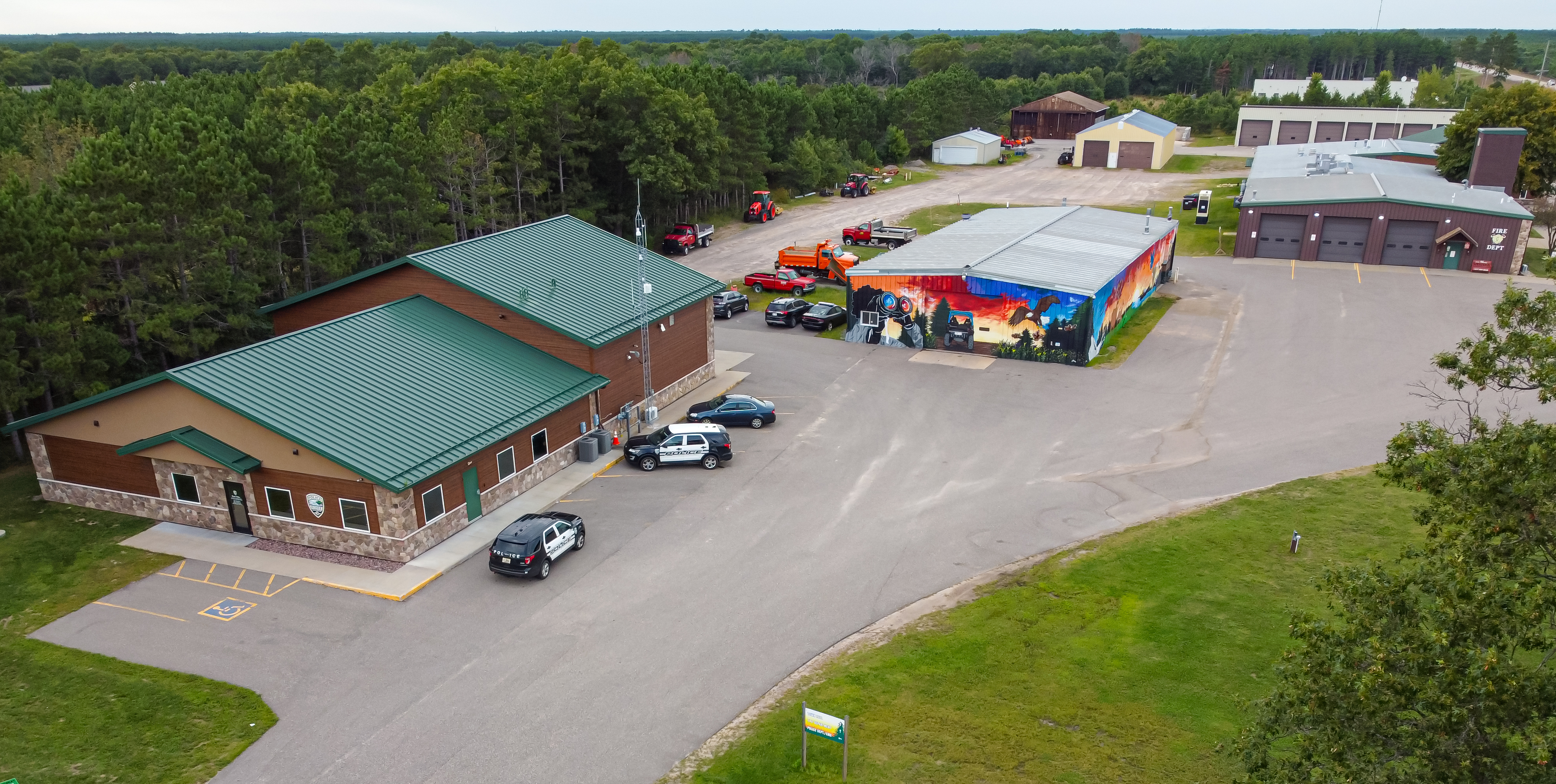
- Town hall
- Motto: A Town for All Seasons
- Location in Adams County and the state of Wisconsin.
- Country: United States
- State: Wisconsin
- County: Adams

Area
  - Total: 62.3 sq mi (161.3 km^{2})
  - Land: 54.1 sq mi (140.2 km^{2})
  - Water: 8.2 sq mi (21.2 km^{2})

Population (2020)
  - Total: 3,025
  - Density: 55.88/sq mi (21.58/km^{2})
- Time zone: UTC-6 (Central (CST))
  - Summer (DST): UTC-5 (CDT)
- ZIP codes: 54457
- Area codes: 608, 715
- FIPS code: 55-69275
- GNIS feature ID: 2742066
- Website: romewi.gov

The Town of Rome is located in Adams County in the U.S. state of Wisconsin. The population was 3,025 at the 2020 census, up from 2,720 at the 2010 census. The census-designated places of Lake Arrowhead, Lake Camelot, and Lake Sherwood are located in the town. The unincorporated communities of New Rome and Rome are also located in the town.

== Geography ==
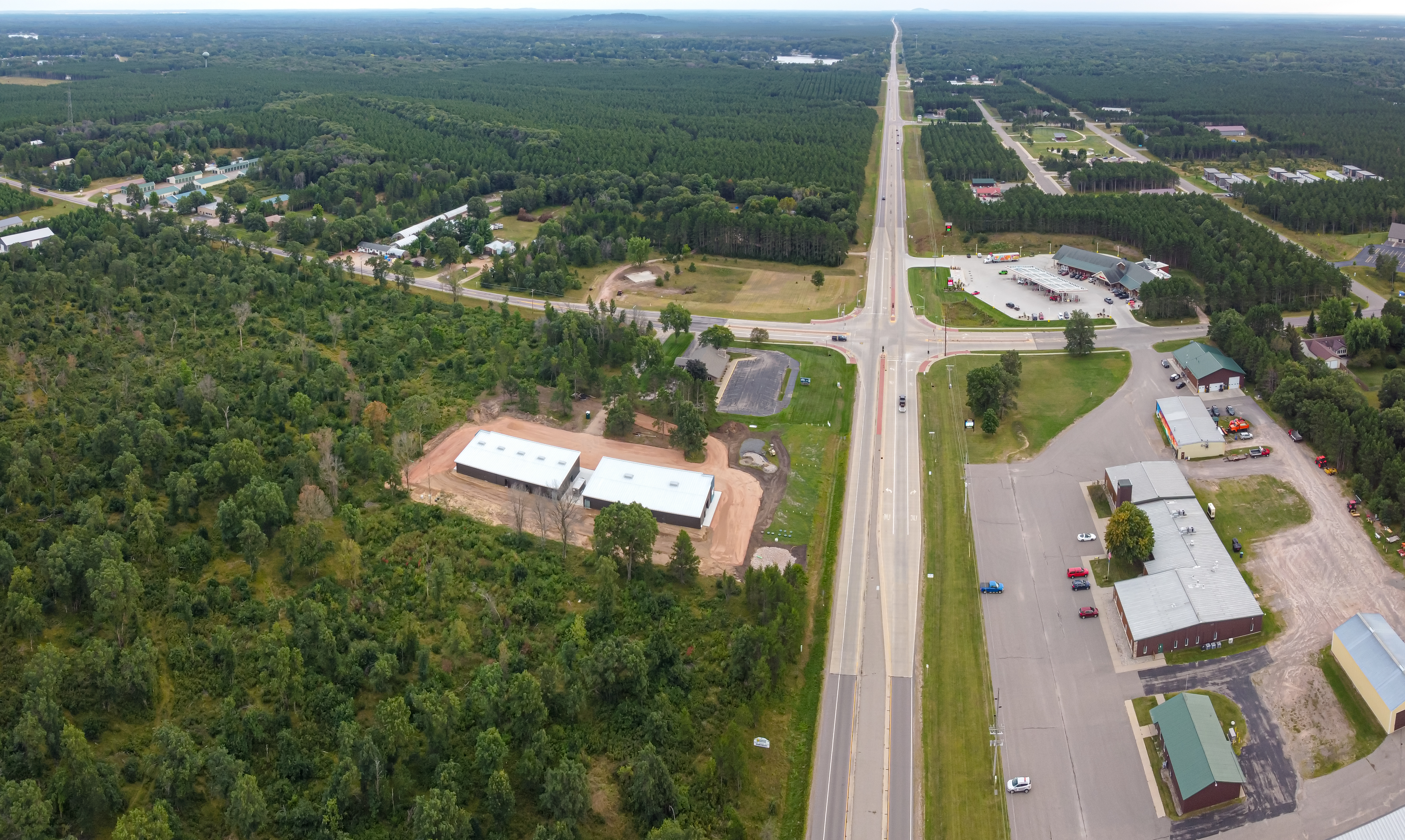

The Town of Rome is located in the northwestern corner of Adams County. Petenwell Lake, an impoundment of the Wisconsin River, covers the western border of the town. Lake Arrowhead, Lake Sherwood, and Camelot Lake are impoundments on Fourteenmile Creek, a tributary of the Wisconsin River, and are surrounded by census-designated places named after the lakes.

According to the United States Census Bureau, the town has a total area of 62.3 square miles (161.3 km^{2}), of which 54.1 square miles (140.2 km^{2}) is land and 8.2 square miles (21.2 km^{2}), or 13.13%, is water.

== Demographics ==
Historical population
Census	Pop.	Note	%±
1870	143		—
1880	219		53.1%
1890	238		8.7%
1900	654		174.8%
1910	445		−32.0%
1920	371		−16.6%
1930	288		−22.4%
1940	279		−3.1%
1950	165		−40.9%
1960	181		9.7%
1970	368		103.3%
1980	1,110		201.6%
1990	1,674		50.8%
2000	2,656		58.7%
2010	2,720		2.4%
2020	3,025		11.2%
U.S. Decennial Census

As of the census of 2000, there were 2,656 people, 1,181 households, and 884 families residing in the town. The population density was 49.0 people per square mile (18.9/km^{2}). There were 2,354 housing units at an average density of 43.4 per square mile (16.8/km^{2}). The racial makeup of the town was 98.42% White, 0.26% Native American, 0.45% Asian, 0.04% from other races, and 0.83% from two or more races. Hispanic or Latino of any race were 0.26% of the population.

There were 1,181 households, out of which 19.8% had children under the age of 18 living with them, 68.8% were married couples living together, 4.2% had a female householder with no husband present, and 25.1% were non-families. 20.9% of all households were made up of individuals, and 8.7% had someone living alone who was 65 years of age or older. The average household size was 2.25 and the average family size was 2.57.

In the town, the population was spread out, with 17.2% under the age of 18, 3.9% from 18 to 24, 20.4% from 25 to 44, 34.3% from 45 to 64, and 24.1% who were 65 years of age or older. The median age was 51 years. For every 100 females, there were 103.4 males. For every 100 females age 18 and over, there were 105.0 males.

The median income for a household in the town was $44,000, and the median income for a family was $46,579. Males had a median income of $40,682 versus $22,083 for females. The per capita income for the town was $23,901. About 3.0% of families and 3.7% of the population were below the poverty line, including 2.4% of those under age 18 and 4.0% of those age 65 or over.

== Education ==
It is in the Nekoosa School District.
