= Quincy (ghost town), Wisconsin =

Quincy, Wisconsin
- Ghost town
- Location within Wisconsin
- Coordinates: 43°52′35″N 89°57′22″W
- Country: United States
- State: Wisconsin
- County: Adams
- Town: Quincy
- Elevation: 883 ft (269 m)
- GNIS feature ID: 1837599

Quincy is a ghost town in the town of Quincy, Adams County, Wisconsin, United States. The community was flooded in the creation of Castle Rock Lake. It had a post office from March 1854 to June 1915.
