= Minersville, Iowa County, Wisconsin =

Minersville
- Former Village
- Location within the state of Wisconsin
- Coordinates: 42°57′48″N 90°7′52″W
- Country: United States
- State: Wisconsin
- County: Iowa
- Time zone: UTC-6 (Central (CST))
  - Summer (DST): UTC-5 (CDT)

Minersville is a former village in Iowa County, Wisconsin, United States, located in present-day Dodgeville. Minersville and neighboring Dirty Hollow were annexed into Dodgeville in the mid-19th century. Minersville was located on modern day Spring Street.

== History ==
Minersville was home to the Dodgeville Mine, hence its name. It also played an important role in housing the areas railroad line. The railroad ran along spring street, right through the small community. Unlike Dirty Hollow, Minersville never was a flourishing community. It housed a few businesses and homes and relied on the mine for its economical center. After the long dispute between Dodgeville and Mineral Point, Dodgeville was made the county seat of Iowa County, and Minersville and Dirty Hollow underwent annexation.
