= Adams County, Wisconsin =

County in Wisconsin, United States

- County
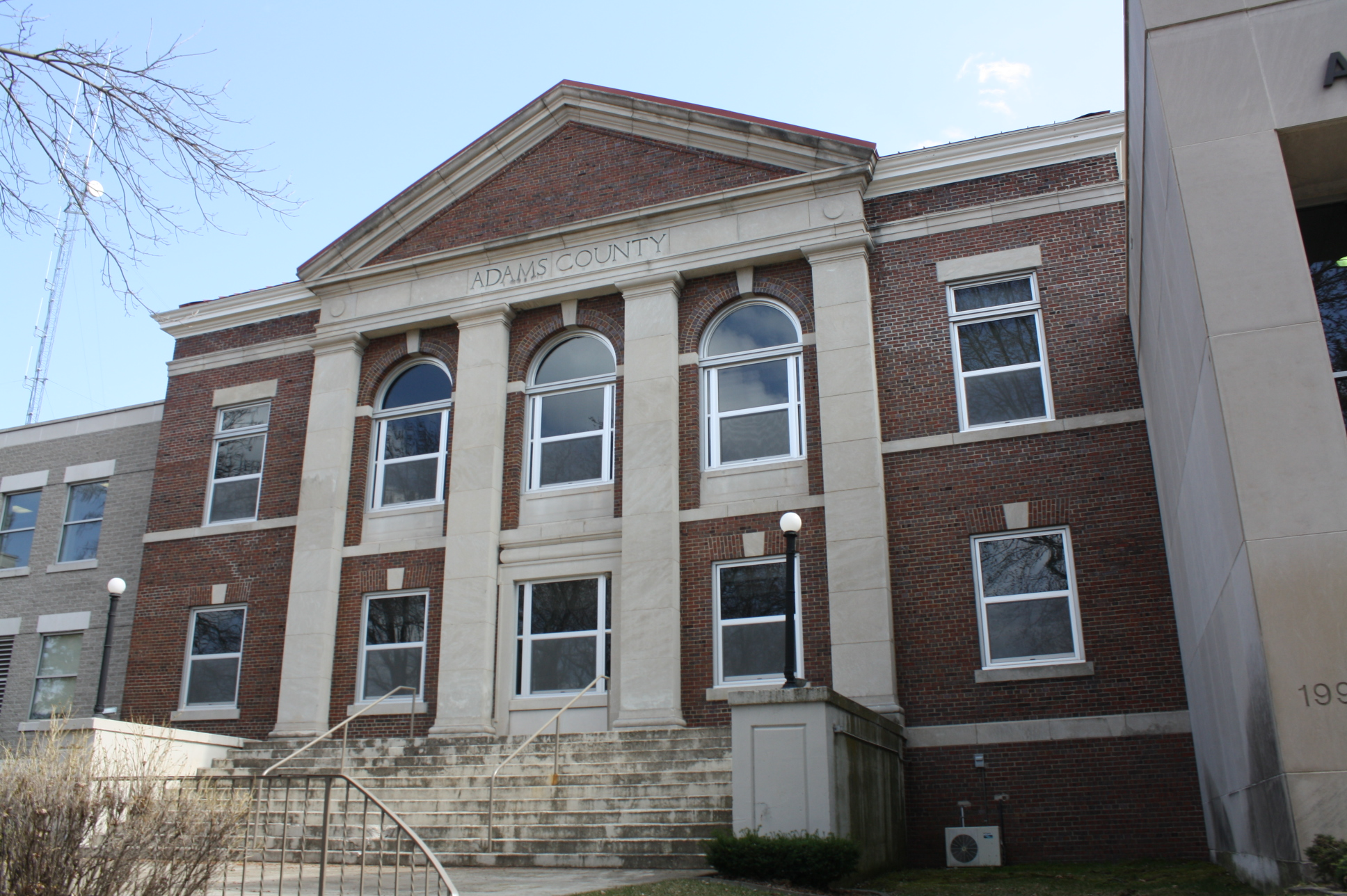
- Adams County Courthouse

- Location within the U.S. state of Wisconsin
- Coordinates: 43°58′N 89°46′W
- Country: United States
- State: Wisconsin
- Founded: 1853
- Named for: John Adams or John Quincy Adams
- Seat: Friendship (village)
- Largest city: Adams

Area
  - Total: 689 sq mi (1,780 km^{2})
  - Land: 646 sq mi (1,670 km^{2})
  - Water: 43 sq mi (110 km^{2}) 6.2%

Population (2020)
  - Total: 20,654
  - Estimate (2025): 21,752 ▲
  - Density: 32.0/sq mi (12.3/km^{2})
- Time zone: UTC−6 (Central)
  - Summer (DST): UTC−5 (CDT)
- Congressional district: 3rd
- Website: www.co.adams.wi.us

Adams County is a county in the U.S. state of Wisconsin. As of the 2020 census, the population was 20,654. Its county seat is Friendship. The county was created in 1848 and organized in 1853. Sources differ as to whether its name is in honor of the second President of the United States, John Adams, or his son, the sixth President, John Quincy Adams. The county is considered a high-recreation retirement destination by the U.S. Department of Agriculture.

== History ==
The founders of Adams County were from upstate New York. These people were "Yankee" settlers, that is to say they were largely descended from the English Separatists who settled New England in the 1600s. They were part of a wave of New England farmers who headed west into what was then the wilds of the Northwest Territory during the early 1800s. Most of them arrived as a result of the completion of the Erie Canal and the end of the Black Hawk War. They got to what is now Adams County by sailing up the Wisconsin River from the Mississippi River on small barges which they constructed themselves out of materials obtained from the surrounding woodlands. When they arrived in what is now Adams County, there was nothing but dense virgin forest, the "Yankee" New Englanders laid out farms, constructed roads, erected government buildings, and established post routes. They brought with them many of their Yankee New England values, such as a passion for education, establishing many schools as well as staunch support for abolitionism. They were mostly members of the Congregationalist Church though some were Episcopalian. Due to the second Great Awakening, some of them had converted to Methodism and some became Baptist before moving to what is now Adams County. Adams County, like much of Wisconsin, would be culturally very continuous with early New England culture for most of its early history.

In the late 1880s, German immigrants began to settle in Adams County, making up less than one out of thirty settlers in the county before this date. Generally there was little conflict between them and the "Yankee" settlers, however when conflict did arise it focused around the issue of prohibition of alcohol. On this issue the Yankees were divided and the Germans almost unanimously were opposed to it, tipping the balance in favor of opposition to prohibition. Later the two communities would be divided on the issue of World War I in which, once again, the Yankee community would be divided and the Germans were unanimously opposed to American entry into the war. The Yankee community was generally pro-British, however many of the Yankees also did not want America to enter the war themselves. The Germans were sympathetic to Germany and did not want the United States to enter into a war against Germany, but the Germans were not anti-British. Prior to World War I, many German community leaders in Wisconsin spoke openly and enthusiastically about how much better America was than Germany, due primarily (in their eyes) to the presence of English law and the English political culture the Americans had inherited from the colonial era, which they contrasted with the turmoil and oppression in Germany which they had so recently fled. The area covered by present-day Adams County was historically part of several other counties. In 1840, when Wisconsin was still a territory, Adams County was the southwestern section of Brown County. In 1836, Portage County was created and included most of present-day Columbia County, including the city of Portage, Wisconsin. In 1846, Portage County was renamed Columbia County. The area from the northern boundary of Columbia County to Lake Superior was removed from Brown County and was then called Portage County. In 1848, the southern part of Portage County was renamed Adams County and included all of current-day Adams County and the northern section of Juneau County. Adams County was organized in April 1853. In 1858, The northwestern part of Adams County was joined with the northern part of Sauk County to form present-day Juneau County. At this time, Adams County took its current shape.

Friendship was founded by settlers coming from Friendship, New York. Today, Adams is the largest community in Adams County, but this was not always so. In the 1880s, there were plans for a railroad that connected Chicago and St. Paul to pass through Friendship. Once this was decided, local landowners increased their demands. Instead of paying more for the land in Friendship, the railroad placed the tracks two miles (3.2 km) south of Friendship. It was recorded that Emma Barnes, wife of "Appletree" Barnes, Friendship postmaster in the 1920s, wrote in 1957, "I believe that the people of Friendship should express their appreciation of two of the early citizens... J. B. Hill and J. W. Purves... for holding the price of their land so high that the great C&NW R.R. Co. would not purchase a right of way... for who would enjoy the smoke and the noise of a train running through this beautiful village?"

To house workers, boxcars were stacked to form housing, and the town of Adams was created. What is now the city of Adams the railroad originally called Friendship, but because there were two rail depot stops named "Friendship" on the rail-line, passengers were often confused and bought the wrong tickets, so it was suggested that the name be changed. The new name was determined by the citizens who chose between Adams, for President John Adams, and Nottingham. This stretch of track became the famous "400" route. Today the population of Adams is about three times that of Friendship, WI.

== Geography ==
According to the U.S. Census Bureau, the county has a total area of 689 square miles (1,780 km^{2}), of which 646 square miles (1,670 km^{2}) is land and 43 square miles (110 km^{2}) (6.2%) is water.

=== Major highways ===
- Highway 13 (Wisconsin)
- Highway 21 (Wisconsin)
- Highway 23 (Wisconsin)
- Highway 73 (Wisconsin)
- Highway 82 (Wisconsin)

=== Railroads ===
- Union Pacific

=== Airport ===
- 63C - Adams County Airport serves the county and surrounding communities.

=== Adjacent counties ===
- Wood County – northwest
- Portage County – northeast
- Waushara County – east
- Marquette County – east
- Columbia County – southeast
- Sauk County – southwest
- Juneau County – west

== Demographics ==
Historical population
Census	Pop.	Note	%±
1850	187		—
1860	6,492		3,371.7%
1870	6,601		1.7%
1880	6,741		2.1%
1890	6,889		2.2%
1900	9,141		32.7%
1910	8,604		−5.9%
1920	9,287		7.9%
1930	8,003		−13.8%
1940	8,449		5.6%
1950	7,906		−6.4%
1960	7,566		−4.3%
1970	9,234		22.0%
1980	13,457		45.7%
1990	15,682		16.5%
2000	18,643		18.9%
2010	20,875		12.0%
2020	20,654		−1.1%
2025 (est.)	21,752	▲	5.3%
U.S. Decennial Census; 1790–1960 1900–1990; 1990–2000 2010–2020

=== Racial and ethnic composition ===
Adams County, Wisconsin – Racial and ethnic composition Note: the US Census treats Hispanic/Latino as an ethnic category. This table excludes Latinos from the racial categories and assigns them to a separate category. Hispanics/Latinos may be of any race.
Race / Ethnicity (NH = Non-Hispanic)	Pop 1980	Pop 1990	Pop 2000	Pop 2010	Pop 2020	% 1980	% 1990	% 2000	% 2010	% 2020
White alone (NH)	12,973	14,849	18,021	19,013	18,372	96.40%	94.69%	96.66%	91.08%	88.95%
Black or African American alone (NH)	256	353	50	611	593	1.90%	2.25%	0.27%	2.93%	2.87%
Native American or Alaska Native alone (NH)	90	119	101	179	165	0.67%	0.76%	0.54%	0.86%	0.80%
Asian alone (NH)	19	51	62	80	84	0.14%	0.33%	0.33%	0.38%	0.41%
Native Hawaiian or Pacific Islander alone (NH)	x	x	3	4	8	x	x	0.02%	0.02%	0.04%
Other race alone (NH)	14	2	6	5	60	0.10%	0.01%	0.03%	0.02%	0.29%
Mixed race or Multiracial (NH)	x	x	132	200	575	x	x	0.71%	0.96%	2.78%
Hispanic or Latino (any race)	105	308	268	783	797	0.78%	1.96%	1.44%	3.75%	3.86%
Total	13,457	15,682	18,643	20,875	20,654	100.00%	100.00%	100.00%	100.00%	100.00%

=== 2020 census ===
As of the 2020 census, the county had a population of 20,654. The population density was 32.0 inhabitants per square mile (12.4/km^{2}). There were 16,692 housing units at an average density of 25.9 per square mile (10.0/km^{2}).

The median age was 53.8 years. 14.6% of residents were under the age of 18 and 28.8% of residents were 65 years of age or older. For every 100 females there were 116.9 males, and for every 100 females age 18 and over there were 119.5 males age 18 and over.

There were 9,049 households in the county, of which 17.1% had children under the age of 18 living in them. Of all households, 49.1% were married-couple households, 22.4% were households with a male householder and no spouse or partner present, and 19.8% were households with a female householder and no spouse or partner present. About 31.4% of all households were made up of individuals and 15.8% had someone living alone who was 65 years of age or older.

Of the 16,692 housing units, 45.8% were vacant. Among occupied housing units, 83.2% were owner-occupied and 16.8% were renter-occupied. The homeowner vacancy rate was 2.5% and the rental vacancy rate was 9.1%.

The racial makeup of the county was 90.7% White, 2.9% Black or African American, 1.0% American Indian and Alaska Native, 0.4% Asian, <0.1% Native Hawaiian and Pacific Islander, 1.1% from some other race, and 3.9% from two or more races. Hispanic or Latino residents of any race comprised 3.9% of the population.

<0.1% of residents lived in urban areas, while 100.0% lived in rural areas.

=== 2000 census ===
As of the census of 2000, there were 18,643 people, 7,900 households, and 5,466 families residing in the county. The population density was 29 people per square mile (11 people/km^{2}). There were 14,123 housing units at an average density of 22 per square mile (8.5/km^{2}). The racial makeup of the county was 97.63% White, 0.27% Black or African American, 0.59% Native American, 0.33% Asian, 0.02% Pacific Islander, 0.33% from other races, and 0.83% from two or more races. 1.44% of the population were Hispanic or Latino of any race. 39.3% were of German, 14.8% American, 9.2% Polish, 8.3% Norwegian, 8.0% Irish and 6.0% English ancestry. 96.1% spoke English, 1.8% Spanish and 1.1% German as their first language.

There were 7,900 households, out of which 23.60% had children under the age of 18 living with them, 58.50% were married couples living together, 6.70% had a female householder with no husband present, and 30.80% were non-families. 25.50% of all households were made up of individuals, and 11.50% had someone living alone who was 65 years of age or older. The average household size was 2.33 and the average family size was 2.76.

In the county, the population was spread out, with 20.80% under the age of 18, 5.60% from 18 to 24, 24.30% from 25 to 44, 28.40% from 45 to 64, and 20.90% who were 65 years of age or older. The median age was 44 years. For every 100 females there were 102.90 males. For every 100 females age 18 and over, there were 101.30 males.

In 2017, there were 131 births, giving a general fertility rate of 57.1 births per 1000 women aged 15–44, the 17th lowest rate out of all 72 Wisconsin counties. 51 of the births were to unmarried mothers, 80 were to married mothers. In 2017, 12.2% of the babies had a low birthweight, up from 7.8% in 2016 and the highest by percent in the state for 2017. In 71.0% of cases, prenatal care was deemed to be adequate, the 13th lowest in the state. Additionally, there were 10 induced abortions performed on women of Adams County residence in 2017.

== Communities ==

Bracketed number refers to location on map, right

=== Cities ===
- Adams (7)
- Wisconsin Dells (also in Columbia County, Juneau County, and Sauk County) (9)

=== Village ===
- Friendship (6) (county seat)

=== Towns ===
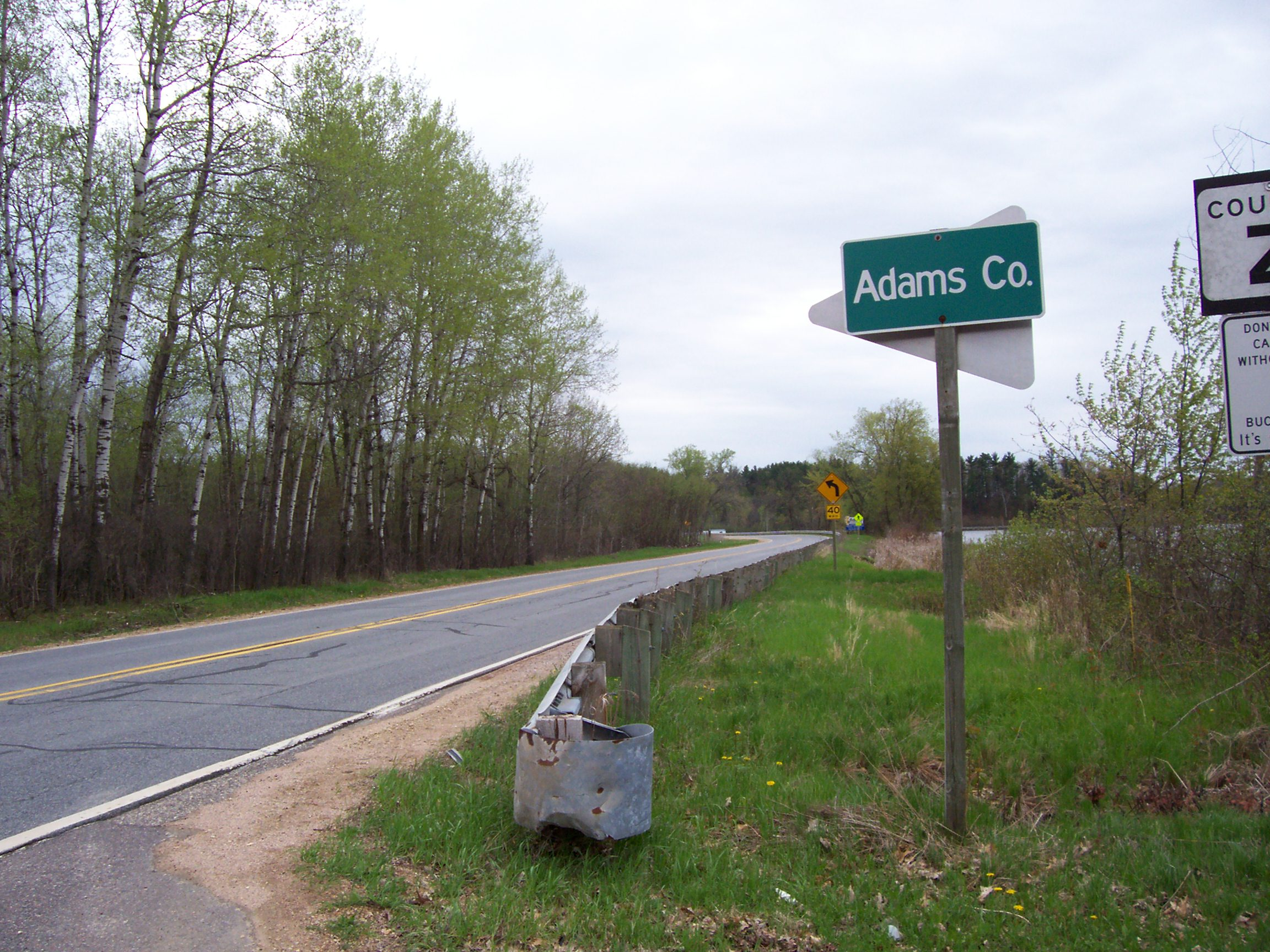
County boundary marker along the Wisconsin River.

- Adams
- Big Flats
- Colburn
- Dell Prairie
- Easton
- Jackson
- Leola
- Lincoln
- Monroe
- New Chester
- New Haven
- Preston
- Quincy
- Richfield
- Rome
- Springville
- Strongs Prairie

=== Census-designated places ===
- Arkdale (4)
- Dellwood (5)
- Grand Marsh (8)
- Lake Arrowhead (1)
- Lake Camelot (3)
- Lake Sherwood (2)

=== Unincorporated communities ===
- Big Spring
- Brookside
- Brooks
- Cottonville
- Davis Corners
- Easton
- Monroe Center
- New Rome
- Plainville
- Rome
- Strongs Prairie
- White Creek

=== Ghost towns/neighborhoods ===
- Adams Center
- Dell Prairie
- Fordham
- New Chester
- Pilot Knob
- Quincy
- Roche a Cri
- Springbluff

== Politics ==
United States presidential election results for Adams County, Wisconsin
Year	Republican		Democratic		Third party(ies)	
Year	No.	%	No.	%	No.	%
1892	972	68.89%	402	28.49%	37	2.62%
1896	1,432	76.74%	391	20.95%	43	2.30%
1900	1,513	77.47%	409	20.94%	31	1.59%
1904	1,399	79.90%	273	15.59%	79	4.51%
1908	1,167	68.97%	436	25.77%	89	5.26%
1912	689	46.09%	462	30.90%	344	23.01%
1916	957	51.15%	824	44.04%	90	4.81%
1920	1,528	76.13%	392	19.53%	87	4.33%
1924	779	28.99%	173	6.44%	1,735	64.57%
1928	1,624	62.95%	914	35.43%	42	1.63%
1932	777	26.35%	2,120	71.89%	52	1.76%
1936	1,191	33.28%	2,289	63.96%	99	2.77%
1940	1,818	48.74%	1,883	50.48%	29	0.78%
1944	1,579	51.40%	1,478	48.11%	15	0.49%
1948	1,259	45.60%	1,419	51.39%	83	3.01%
1952	2,259	65.35%	1,180	34.13%	18	0.52%
1956	1,854	59.48%	1,244	39.91%	19	0.61%
1960	2,109	57.40%	1,551	42.22%	14	0.38%
1964	1,219	34.94%	2,262	64.83%	8	0.23%
1968	1,691	44.81%	1,614	42.77%	469	12.43%
1972	2,200	53.18%	1,833	44.31%	104	2.51%
1976	2,377	42.54%	3,089	55.28%	122	2.18%
1980	3,304	50.69%	2,773	42.54%	441	6.77%
1984	3,645	56.86%	2,714	42.33%	52	0.81%
1988	3,258	47.33%	3,598	52.27%	27	0.39%
1992	2,465	30.63%	3,539	43.97%	2,044	25.40%
1996	2,450	31.31%	4,119	52.65%	1,255	16.04%
2000	3,920	43.00%	4,826	52.94%	370	4.06%
2004	4,890	46.77%	5,447	52.09%	119	1.14%
2008	3,974	39.80%	5,806	58.14%	206	2.06%
2012	4,644	45.14%	5,542	53.87%	101	0.98%
2016	5,966	58.89%	3,745	36.97%	419	4.14%
2020	7,362	62.29%	4,329	36.63%	127	1.07%
2024	7,763	60.26%	4,443	34.49%	676	5.25%

== Education ==
School districts include:

- Adams-Friendship Area School District
- Nekoosa School District
- Tri-County Area School District
- Westfield School District
- Wisconsin Dells School District

== See also ==
- National Register of Historic Places listings in Adams County, Wisconsin
- Wisconsin
  - List of Wisconsin locations by per capita income
  - List of counties in Wisconsin
  - Wisconsin statistical areas
