= Kaiser, Wisconsin =

- Ghost town
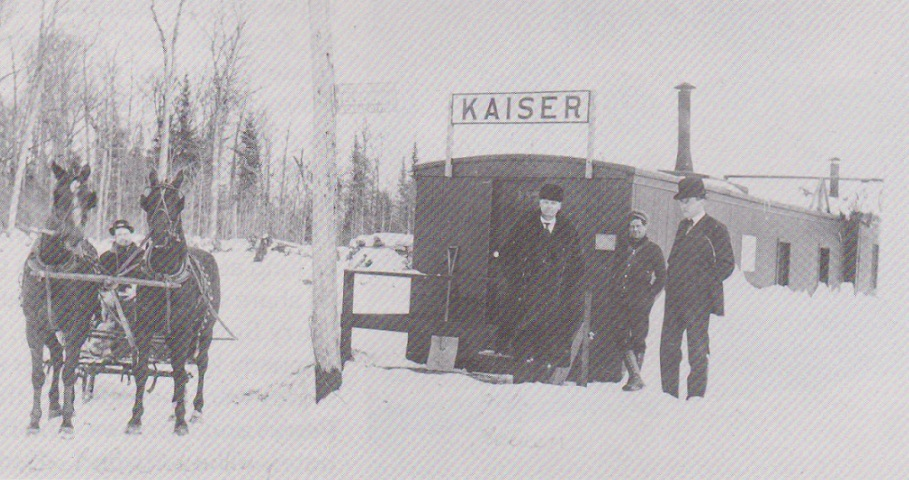
- The Kaiser Train Depot was a decommissioned boxcar.

- Location within Wisconsin
- Coordinates: 45°54′35″N 90°33′06″W
- Country: United States
- State: Wisconsin
- County: Price
- Elevation: 1,499 ft (457 m)
- GNIS feature ID: 1833517

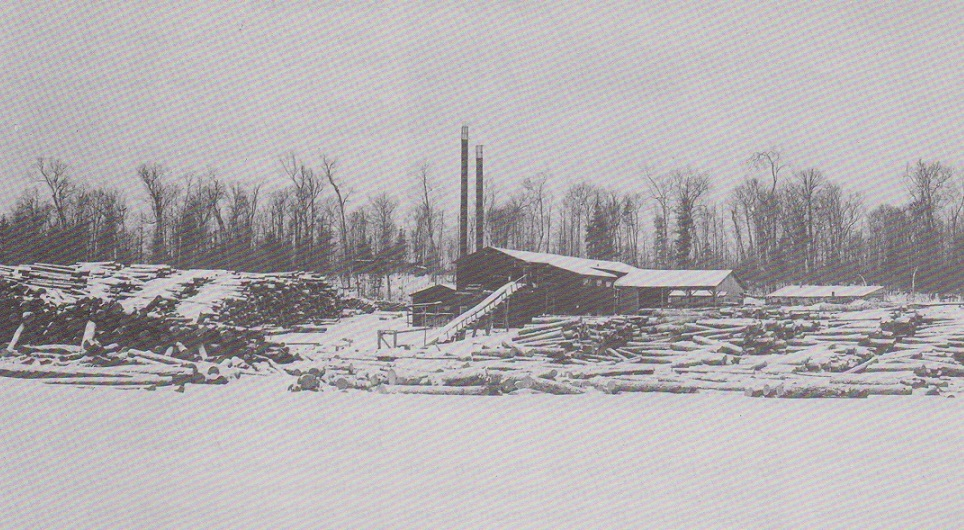
The Kaiser Sawmill

Kaiser is a ghost town in Price County, Wisconsin, United States. Kaiser was located in the town of Lake along the current route of the Tuscobia State Trail, 5 miles (8.0 km) west-southwest of Park Falls. The town was marked on USGS maps as late as 1941.

== History ==
The village of Kaiser was platted by, and named after Arnold E. Kaiser in 1911. He was a logger and civic leader from nearby Park Falls.

Farmland near the area of Kaiser had been settled as early as 1881. John Stehwein homesteaded 160 acres of land along County Road E, an area which became known as "Kaiser's Corner". C.M. Gardner, another early settler, was the namesake of nearby Gardner Lake.

Walter Loomer built a small country store in October 1901. The store, a post office, and a one-room school were already open when the plat for the village was laid out.

The country surrounding Kaiser was one of the better farming areas in northern Price County. Much of it was level and loamy with few rocks in the soil. This attracted many settlers who were interested in farming, and by 1920 Kaiser had some of the most productive dairy farms in northern Price County.

The sawmill that provided work for many residents was built by J.S. Blackwell in 1905, on a pond located about one-half mile west of the "Kaiser's Corner" spot. Blackwell contracted with J.W. and E.W. Noble to build and operate the mill. Logs were brought in by neighboring farmers and the lumber was then either sold, or shipped out to Park Falls by horse-drawn wagon. Operations expanded considerably when the Omaha Railway Line approached Park Falls and built a siding to the mill in 1910.

=== Hopeful future, and eventual downfall ===
Arnold Kaiser, a contract logger, then bought out the Nobles, and ran the mill with Blackwell. He platted his village where the sawmill spur route met the main line of the Omaha Railway, and attempted to sell lots in the village for homes and businesses. He envisioned a prosperous community, named after himself. Although the Kaiser village was the terminus for the Omaha Railway Line for three years before track was extended to Park Falls, only one house was ever built in the platted village. It stood alone in the clearing and was later known as "The Chicken House".

A number of homes, a post office, school, and general store were all built in the vicinity of the sawmill and the "Kaiser's Corner" spot. This was the Kaiser community, and not the streets and lots that were laid out by Mr. Kaiser. His big plans of a large populated community remained a dream that never materialized.
