= Easton, Adams County, Wisconsin =

Easton, Wisconsin
- Town
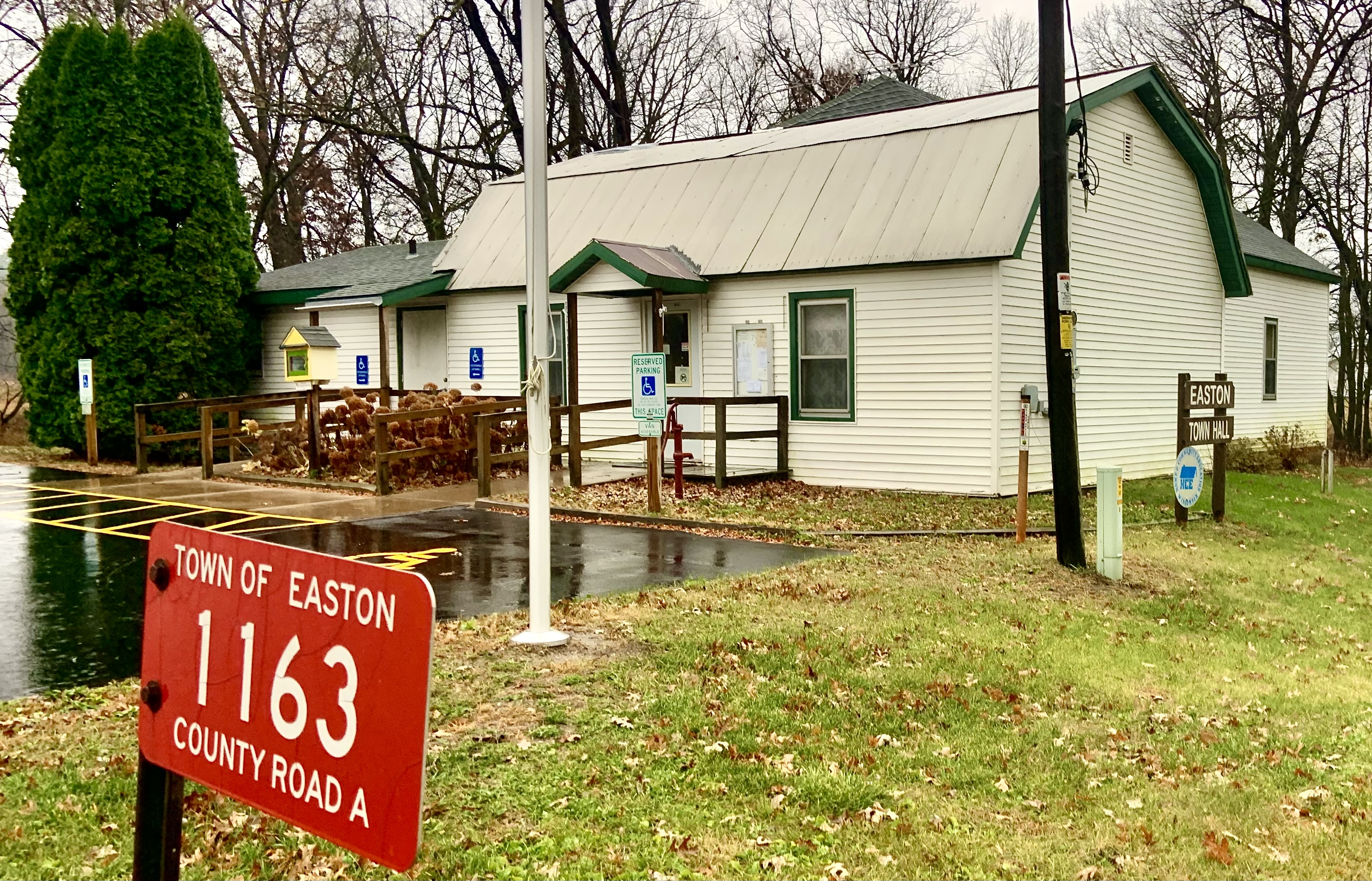
- Town hall

- Location in Adams County and the state of Wisconsin.

- Location within Wisconsin Location within the United States
- Coordinates: 43°50′41″N 89°47′33″W
- Country: United States
- State: Wisconsin
- County: Adams

Area
  - Total: 36.1 sq mi (93.6 km^{2})
  - Land: 36.1 sq mi (93.4 km^{2})
  - Water: 0.077 sq mi (0.2 km^{2})
- Elevation: 961 ft (293 m)

Population (2020)
  - Total: 1,062
  - Density: 29.4/sq mi (11.4/km^{2})
- Time zone: UTC-6 (Central (CST))
  - Summer (DST): UTC-5 (CDT)
- Area code: 608
- FIPS code: 55-22000
- GNIS feature ID: 1583117
- Website: townofeastonwi.gov

Easton is a town in Adams County in the U.S. state of Wisconsin. The population was 1,062 at the 2020 census, down from 1,130 at the 2010 census. The unincorporated communities of Brookside and White Creek are located in the town.

== Geography ==
According to the United States Census Bureau, the town has a total area of 36.1 square miles (93.6 km^{2}), of which 36.1 square miles (93.4 km^{2}) is land and 0.077 square miles (0.2 km^{2}), or 0.26%, is water.

== Demographics ==
Historical population
Census	Pop.	Note	%±
1870	338		—
1880	450		33.1%
1890	376		−16.4%
1900	487		29.5%
1910	489		0.4%
1920	449		−8.2%
1930	411		−8.5%
1940	459		11.7%
1950	394		−14.2%
1960	393		−0.3%
1970	491		24.9%
1980	858		74.7%
1990	824		−4.0%
2000	1,194		44.9%
2010	1,130		−5.4%
2020	1,062		−6.0%
U.S. Decennial Census

As of the census of 2000, there were 1,194 people, 486 households, and 325 families residing in the town. The population density was 33.1 people per square mile (12.8 people/km^{2}). There were 821 housing units at an average density of 22.7 units per square mile (8.8 units/km^{2}). The racial makeup of the town was 97.57% White, 0.84% African American, 0.17% Native American, 0.17% Asian, 0.25% from other races, and 1.01% from two or more races. Hispanic or Latino of any race were 1.59% of the population. No Pacific Islanders live in Easton.

There were 486 households, out of which 28.0% had children under the age of 18 living with them, 53.5% were married couples living together, 7.4% had a female householder with no husband present, and 33.1% were non-families. 27.4% of all households were made up of individuals, and 11.9% had someone living alone who was 65 years of age or older. The average household size was 2.46 and the average family size was three people.

In the town, the population was spread out, with 26.6% under the age of 18, 5.9% from 18 to 24, 25.0% from 25 to 44, 26.3% from 45 to 64, and 16.1% who were 65 years of age or older. The median age was 39 years. For every 100 females, there were 103.8 males. For every 100 females age 18 and over, there were 100.9 males.

The median income for a household in the town was $30,469, and the median income for a family was $35,043. Males had a median income of $32,778 versus $21,667 for females. The per capita income for the town was $15,011. 11.2% of the population and 7.7% of families were below the poverty line. 14% of those under the age of 18 and 8.9% of those 65 and older were living below the poverty line.

== Education ==
It is in the Adams-Friendship Area School District.
