= Adams-Friendship Area School District =

School district in Wisconsin, United States

- 201 W 6th St, Friendship, Wisconsin 53934, United States

District information
- Type: Public
- Grades: PreK-12
- NCES District ID: 5500060

Students and staff
- Students: 1,270
- Teachers: 118.34
- Student–teacher ratio: 10.73

Other information
- Website: www.afasd.net

Adams-Friendship Area School District is located entirely within Adams County with its headquarters in Friendship Wisconsin. The district operates three schools: Adams-Friendship Elementary, Adams-Friendship Middle School and Adams-Friendship High School.

In addition to the village it also services the city of Adams, Easton and several additional census designated places.
