= Gerhard Lomer =

Gerhard Richard Lomer (1882–1970) was a librarian, editor, and writer. He was the librarian for McGill University Library from 1920 until 1947 and established the university's graduate level library school.

== Biography ==
Lomer was born in Montréal on 6 March 1882 to Adolph Henry Lomer, an insurance broker, and Ellen Adèle LaFleur. His grandfather was Gerhard Friedrich Lomer (1819–1895), a furrier in Montreal, New York and Leipzig, was president of German Society of Montreal from 1860 until 1865. Lomer was baptised at l'Oratoire French Baptist church and his godparents were Richard and Alma Lomer.

He graduated McGill with a B.A. in 1903. From 1903 until 1907 he taught English and Education at McGill. He received a Ph.D. in education from Columbia University in 1910. He co-wrote a text on English composition, with Margaret Ashmun, The Study and Practice of Writing English, in 1914. During this period he wrote for the Warner Library of the World's Best Literature, a reference book and digest of world literature including entries on the study of literature as well as Allen Johnson's series Chronicles of America. He also edited books by prominent authors of his day including John Moody, the founder of Moody's.

In 1920 Lomer was appointed McGill University's Librarian, a position he remained at until his retirement in 1947. In 1927, he established McGill's Library School as a full graduate course from what had been a summer program. He was Director and Professor of Library Administration from 1927 until 1947 and also served as associate director of the University of Ottawa's Library School. He was instrumental in the founding of the university's ornithological library.

Lomer was consulted on the rejuvenation of Prince Edward Island's library system. He was president of the Quebec Library Association from 1932 until 1933 and became an honorary life president in 1937.

He died January 14, 1970, aged 89 in hospital in Ottawa after being ill for a short while and was buried in Beechwood Cemetery.

== Legacy ==
Lomer has been described as "undoubtedly the single most important individual in the history of Canadian library education." In addition to seeing the McGill Library through difficult financial and geopolitical times, he also oversaw the expansion of the Redpath Library. Lower is credited with founding the first French-language library program in Canada.

== Bibliography ==
- The concept of method
- Writing Of Today: Models Of Journalistic Prose with John William Cunliffe
- Elizabethan Sea-Dogs: A Chronicle of Drake & His Companions (1918) by William Charles Henry Wood, Allen Johnson (editor), Gerhard Richard Lomer (editor)
- The Red Man's Continent: A Chronicle of Aboriginal America (1918) by Ellsworth Huntington, Allen Johnson (editor), Gerhard Richard Lomer (editor)
- The New South (1919) by Holland Thompson, Gerhard Richard Lomer (editor)
- The Chronicles of America Series (1919) (co-author)
- Stephen Leacock entry about Stephen Leacock
- The Study and Practice of Writing English entry
- The Masters of Capital (1919) by John Moody, Gerhard Richard Lomer (editor)
- Correspondence with Allen Johnson, relating to the Chronicles of America Series (1907–1920) letters to various scholars including Romer regarding editorship of the Chronicles of America Series
