= Hudnall (surname) =

Hudnall is an English surname. Notable people with the surname include:

- George Hudnall (1864–1937), American politician
- James D. Hudnall (1957–2019), American writer
