= Dayton, Waupaca County, Wisconsin =

Dayton, Wisconsin
- Town
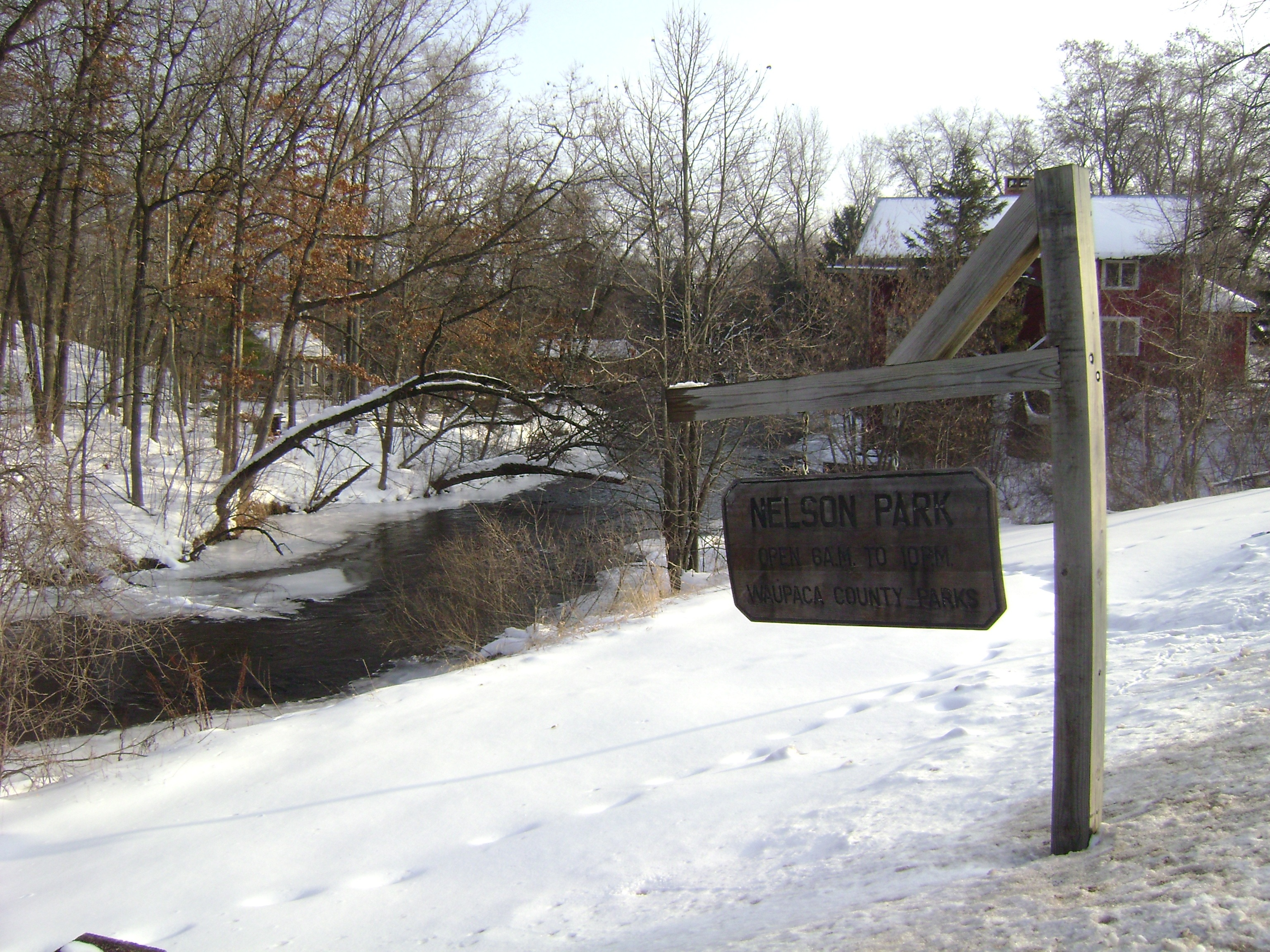
- Nelson Park in northeastern Dayton

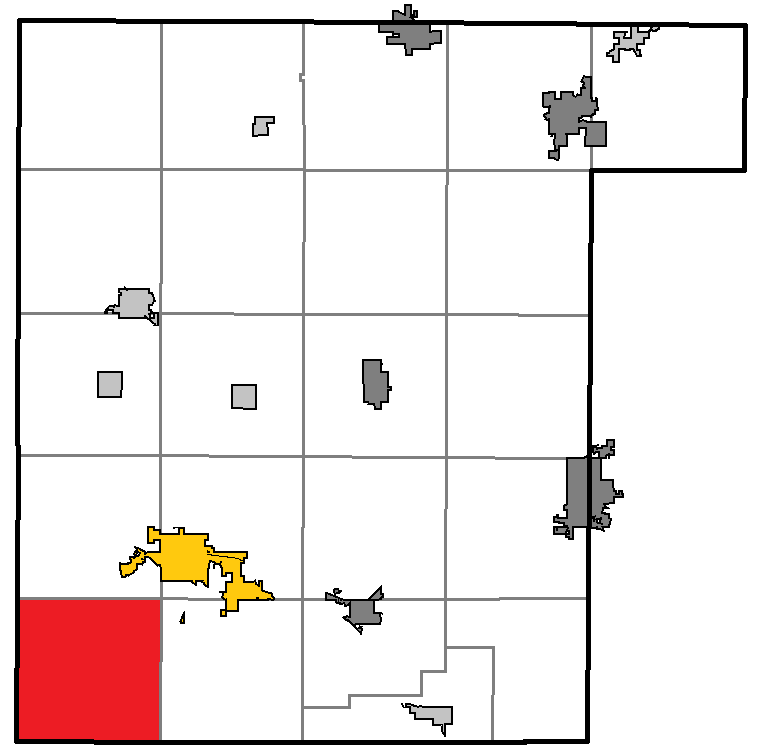
- Location of Dayton, within Waupaca County
- Coordinates: 44°18′24″N 89°9′25″W
- Country: United States
- State: Wisconsin
- County: Waupaca

Area
  - Total: 36.4 sq mi (94.2 km^{2})
  - Land: 35.3 sq mi (91.3 km^{2})
  - Water: 1.2 sq mi (3.0 km^{2})
- Elevation: 892 ft (272 m)

Population (2020)
  - Total: 2,644
  - Density: 75.0/sq mi (29.0/km^{2})
- Time zone: UTC-6 (Central (CST))
  - Summer (DST): UTC-5 (CDT)
- FIPS code: 55-19025
- GNIS feature ID: 1583056
- Website: https://townofdaytonwcwi.gov/

Dayton is a town in Waupaca County, Wisconsin, United States. The population was 2,644 at the 2020 census. The unincorporated communities of Little Hope, Parfreyville, and Rural are located in the town. The census-designated place of Chain O' Lakes is also partially located within the town.

== History ==
The town was named for Lyman Dayton, a Connecticut native who moved to the area in 1850.

== Geography ==
According to the United States Census Bureau, the town has a total area of 36.4 square miles (94.2 km^{2}), of which 35.2 square miles (91.2 km^{2}) is land and 1.1 square miles (3.0 km^{2}) (3.16%) is water.

== Demographics ==
As of the census of 2020, there were 2,674 people residing in the town. The racial makeup of the town included 93.6% White, 0.7% African American, 1.4% Native American, 1.1% Asian, and 0.2% Hawaiian or Pacific Islander. Hispanic or Latino of any race were 2.0% of the population.

== Notable people ==
- Andrew R. Potts, Wisconsin state legislator and farmer, was born in Rural, in the Town of Dayton; Potts served as chairman of the Dayton Town Board

== Images ==
Dayton, Wisconsin
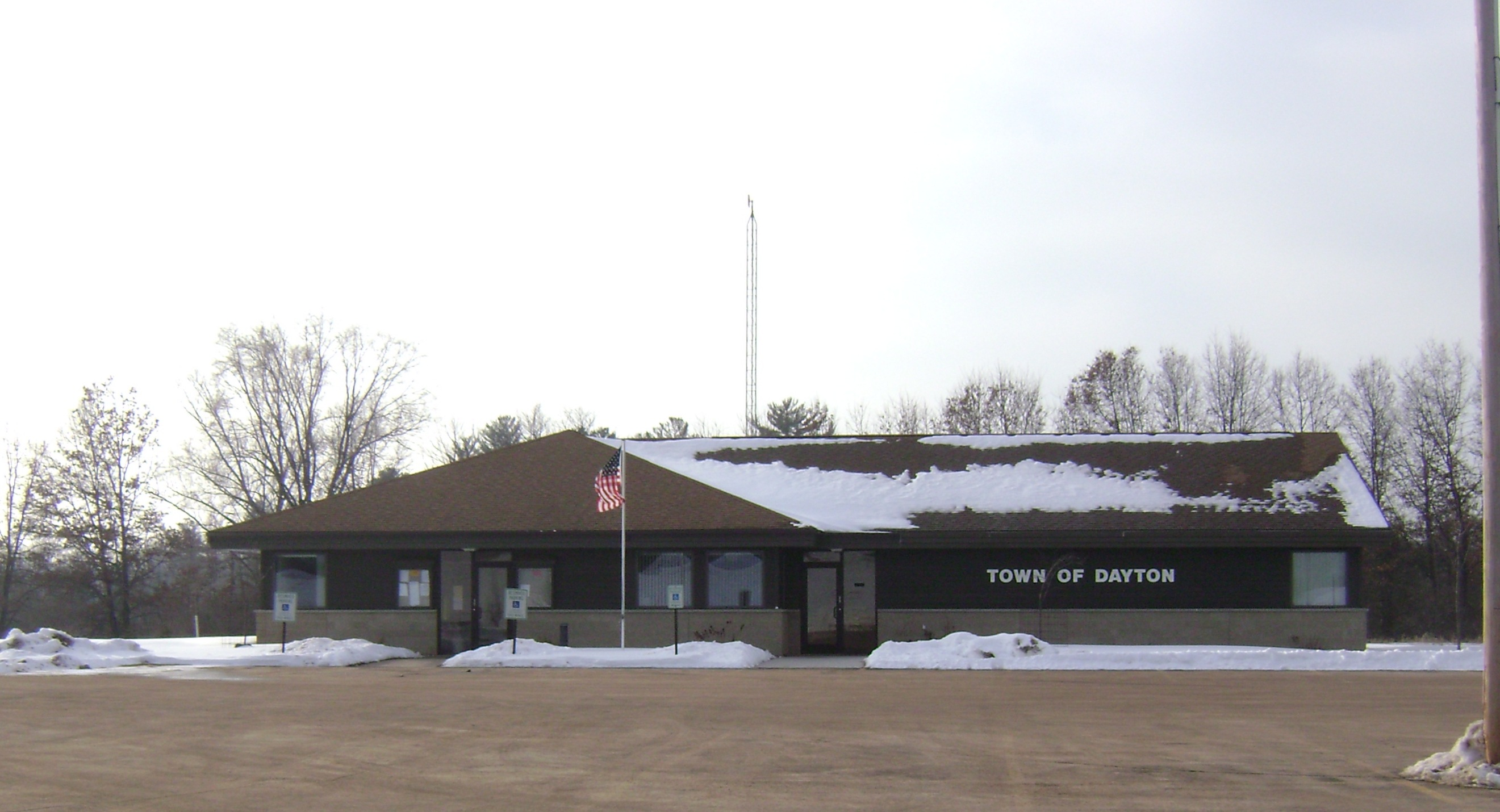
Dayton Town Hall

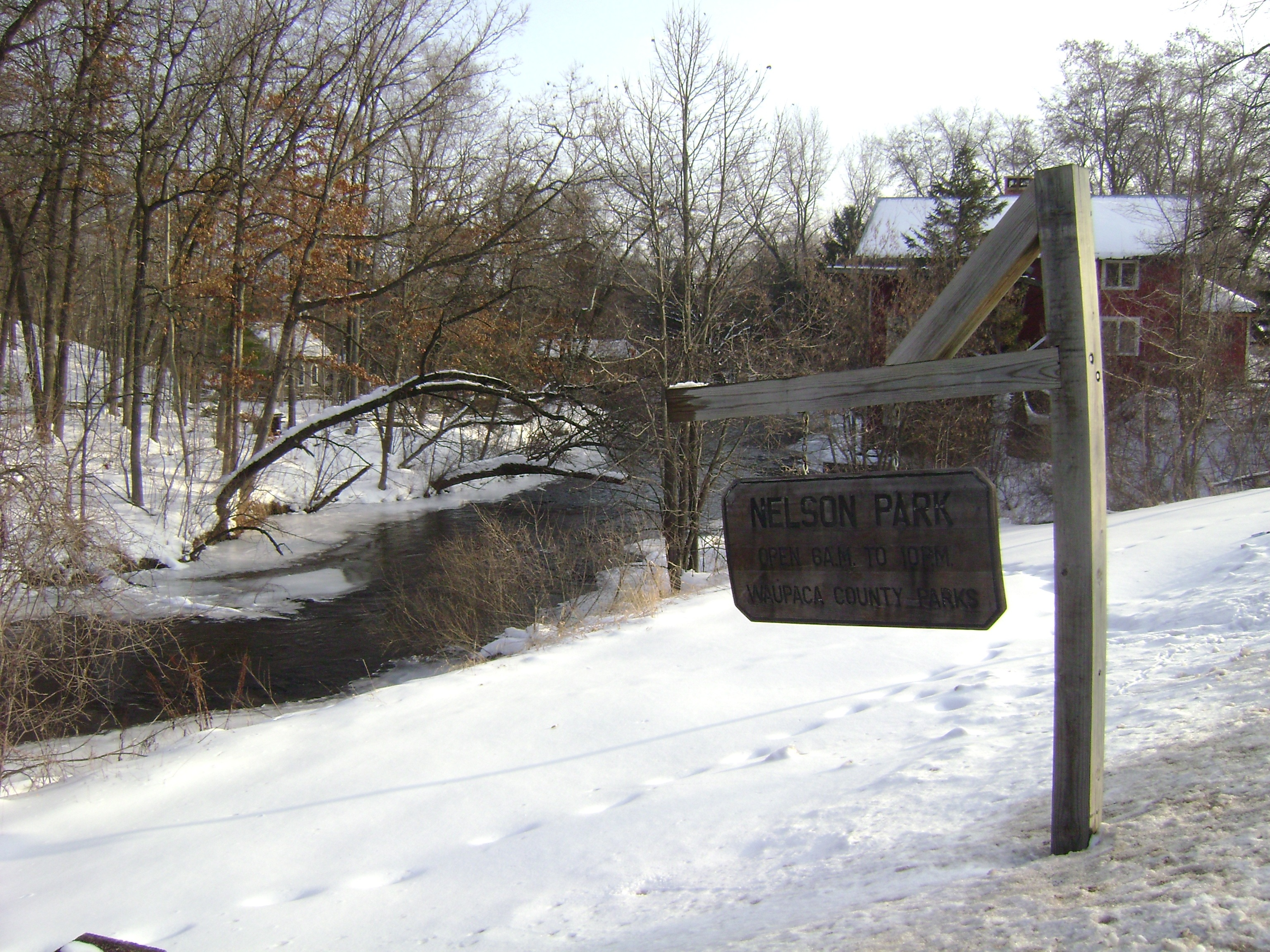
Nelson Park in northeastern Dayton along the Crystal River

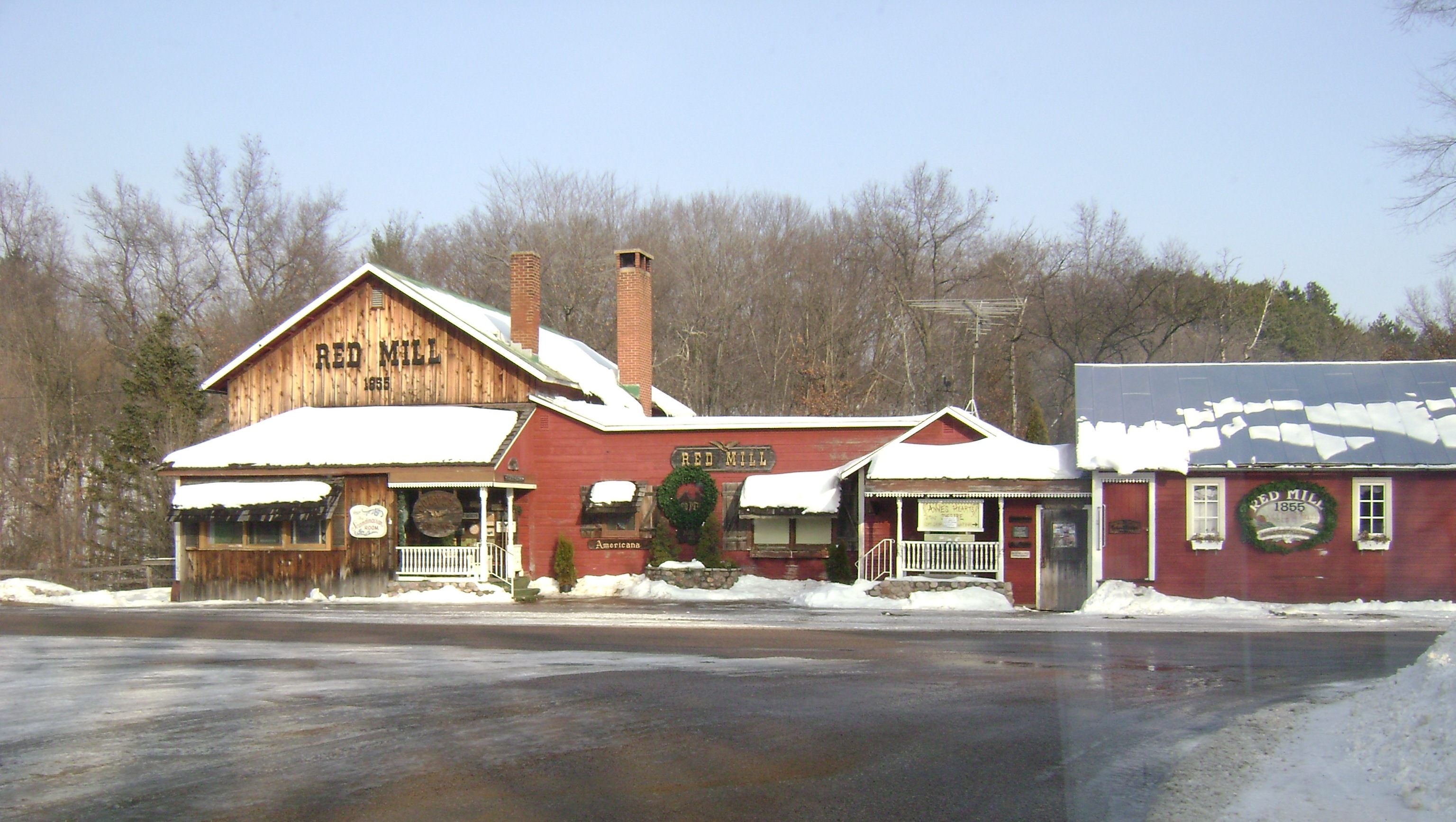
The Red Mill in Little Hope, Wisconsin

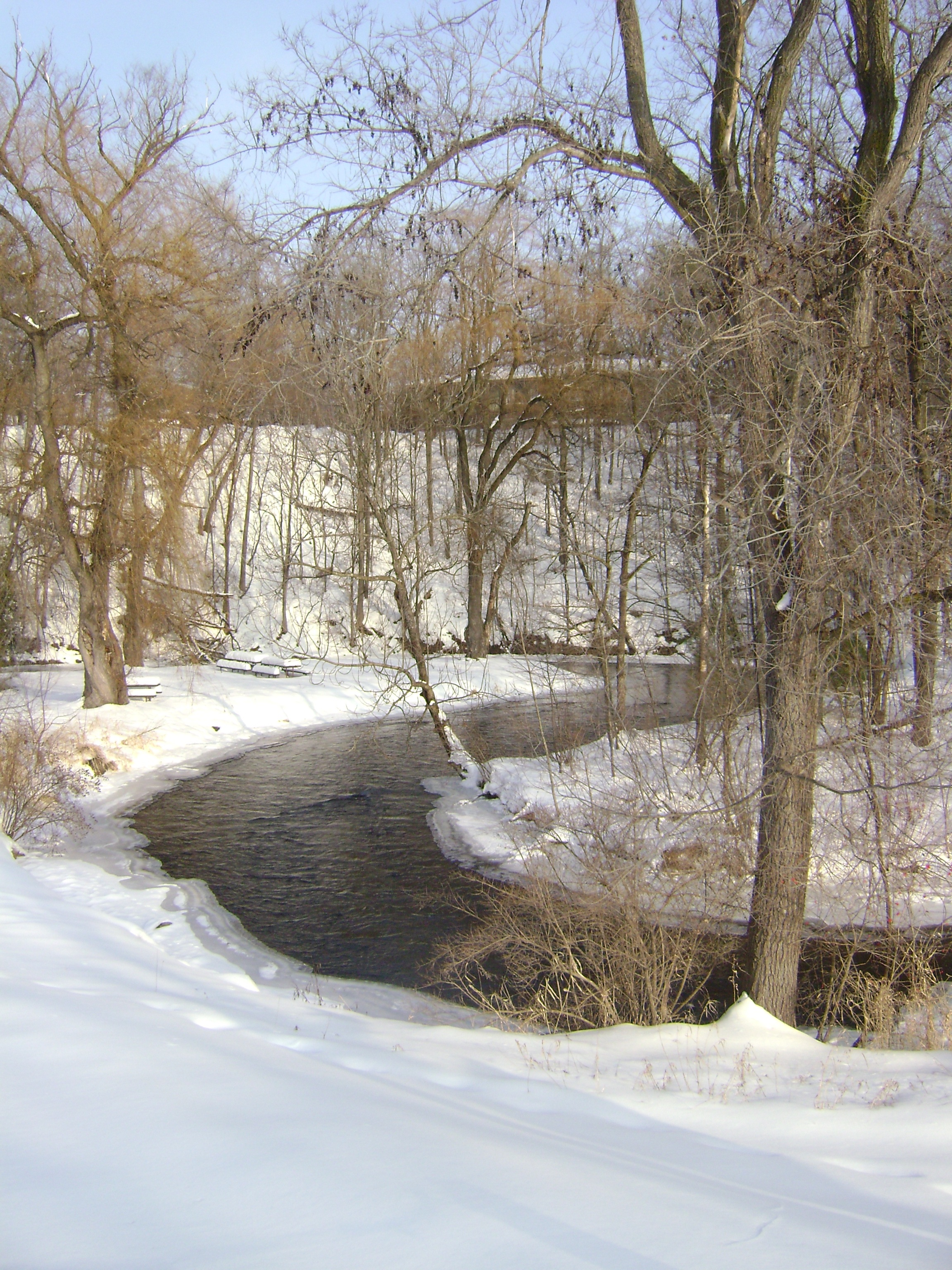
Crystal River
