= Parfreyville, Wisconsin =

- Unincorporated community
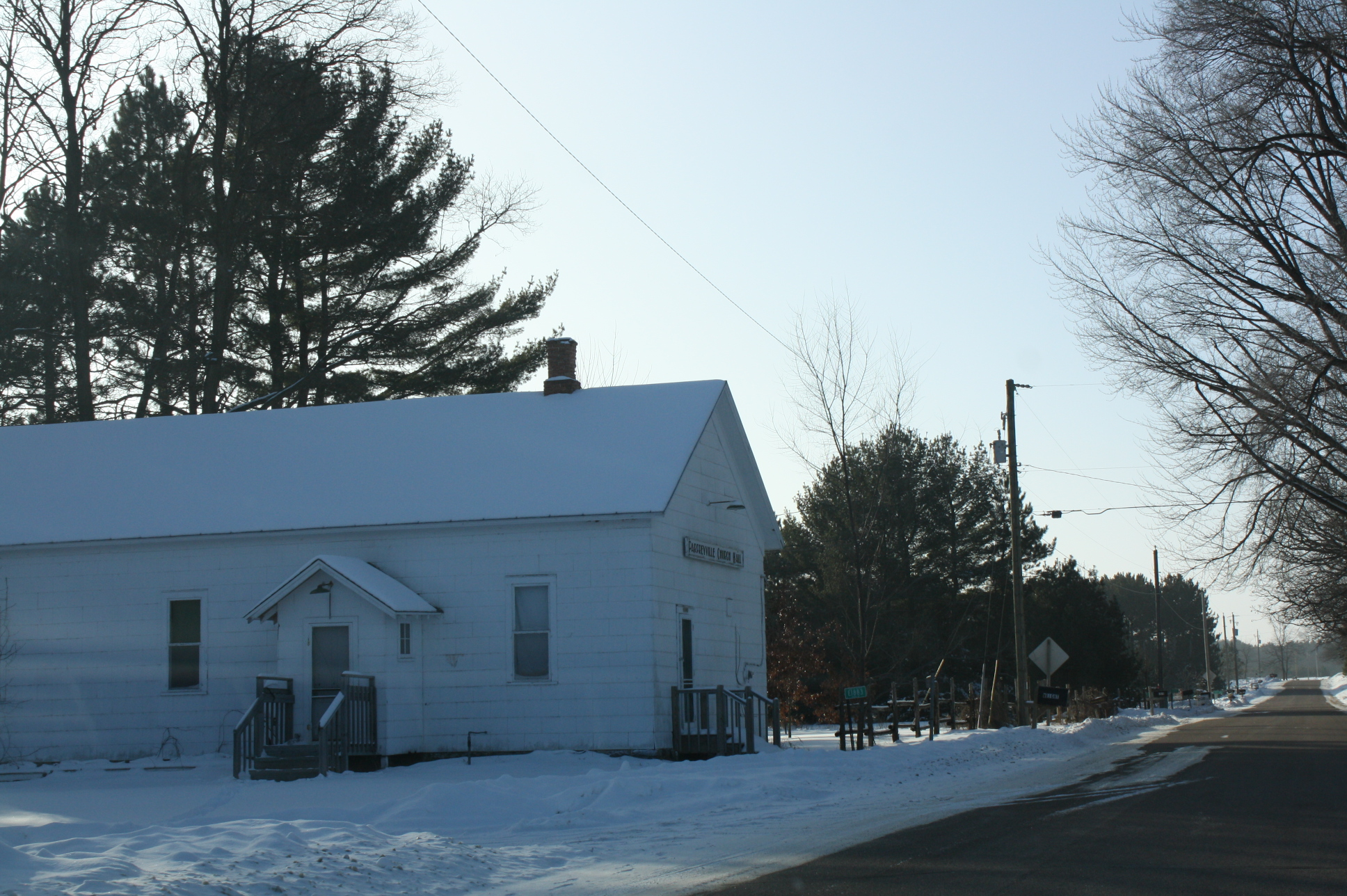
- Parfreyville church hall

- Location within Wisconsin Location within the United States
- Coordinates: 44°18′46″N 89°07′52″W
- Country: United States
- State: Wisconsin
- County: Waupaca
- Elevation: 863 ft (263 m)
- Time zone: UTC-6 (Central (CST))
  - Summer (DST): UTC-5 (CDT)
- Area code: 920
- GNIS feature ID: 1571033

Parfreyville is an unincorporated community in the town of Dayton, Waupaca County, Wisconsin, United States. Parfreyville is located on County Highway K, 4 miles (6.4 km) southwest of Waupaca. The community was founded in 1851 by Robert Parfrey, its namesake.
