= Dumas Malone =

American historian and writer

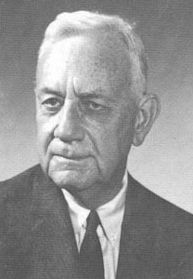
- Born: January 10, 1892; Coldwater, Mississippi, U.S.
- Died: December 27, 1986 (aged 94); Charlottesville, Virginia, U.S.
- Spouse: Elizabeth Gifford (m. 1925)
- Relatives: Kemp Malone (brother)
- Awards: Pulitzer Prize for History (1975); Presidential Medal of Freedom (1983)

Academic background
- Education: Emory College (BA); Yale University (BD, MA, PhD)
- Thesis: The Public Life of Thomas Cooper, 1783–1839 (1923)
- Doctoral advisor: Allen Johnson

Academic work
- Discipline: Historiography
- Institutions: Yale University; University of Virginia; Harvard University; Columbia University
- Notable works: Jefferson and His Time

Dumas Malone (DEW-mah; January 10, 1892 – December 27, 1986) was an American historian, minister, and biographer. A professor by occupation, Malone spent the majority of his career teaching at the University of Virginia (UVA), where he served as the Thomas Jefferson Foundation Professor of History.

Malone was best known for his six-volume biography, Jefferson and His Time, for which he received the 1975 Pulitzer Prize for History. Completed in 1981, the series became Malone's defining work and is considered the foremost authoritative biography of Thomas Jefferson. Before beginning a lifelong career as a biographer, he was editor-in-chief of the twenty-volume Dictionary of American Biography and the third director of the Harvard University Press. In 1983, President Ronald Reagan awarded him the Presidential Medal of Freedom.

== Early life and education ==
=== Upbringing ===
Malone was born in Coldwater, Mississippi, on January 10, 1892, to clergyman John W. Malone (1856–1930) and suffragist schoolteacher Lillian Kemp. (Note: Malone was the second of seven children.) He was raised in a poor, religious household from the Deep South and his grandfather was a Confederate veteran who served in the American Civil War. His mother and father were educators who recognized the value of an intellectual upbringing; his mother fostered his early disposition for reading, and his father served as an academic at various educational institutions. After Malone's birth, the family moved to Oxford, Mississippi, where John Malone served as president of the Woman's College of Oxford, later becoming a minister in Brunswick, Georgia. In 1902, Malone's father became the president of Andrew College.

In 1906, Malone matriculated at Emory College (now Emory University) at the age of 14, receiving his Bachelor of Arts as the youngest member of the class of 1910. His education at Emory consisted primarily of classical courses supplemented by Latin and Greek literature, the latter of which he was influenced by the classicist Charles Peppler; Malone later reflected of Peppler's class, "If I am something of a classicist in spirit, that course is one of the reasons for it." He also took great inspiration from the economist Edgar H. Johnson, the instructor of the college's only history course, whose teaching Malone credited with leaving "an abiding impression".

Despite doing well in the university's classics courses, Malone later recalled being "not a particularly good student", owing his youth and immaturity as reasons for having been unprepared in college. He played center for the class football team and was a member of the Sigma Nu fraternity, though otherwise graduated from the college relatively undistinguished. Regardless, he later fondly remembered Emory as a "modest home of humane learning." When the college inducted him into the Phi Beta Kappa honor society in 1930, Malone remarked, "That was lucky for me. I am sure they did not pay much attention to my old undergraduate record. I was too busy exploring life to do full justice to my studies."

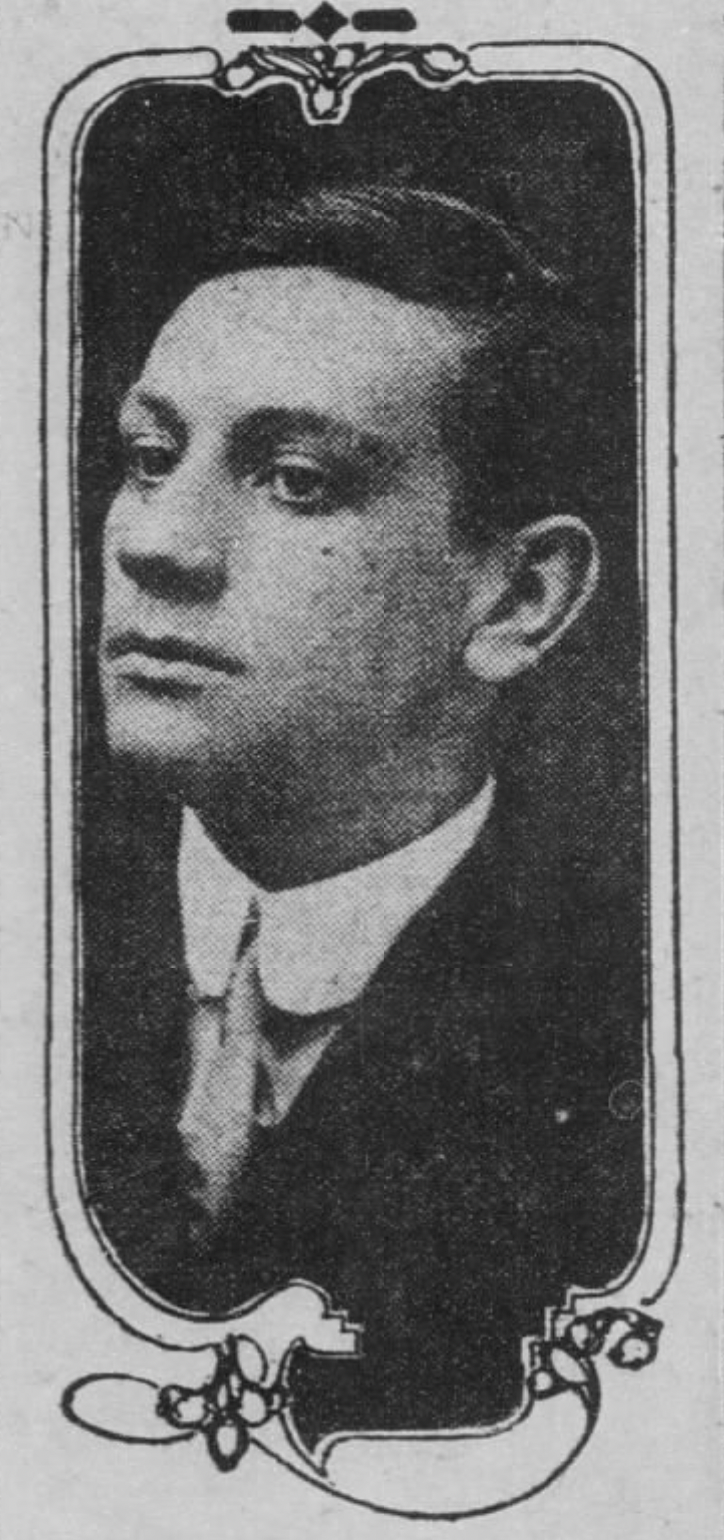
Malone as a young professor of mathematics at Andrew College, pictured in a 1912 edition of The Atlanta Georgian

=== Ministry and Yale ===
Malone initially sought to study religion and enter the ministry upon graduating. He spent several years as a teacher in small, local schools; at Andrew College, he lectured on topics including mathematics, history, and the Bible. Finding a passion for teaching, he briefly taught biblical literature as an adjunct professor at Randolph-Macon Woman's College, where two of his sisters had been educated.

After spending a year at Vanderbilt University, Malone enrolled in Yale Divinity School where he excelled academically, obtaining a Fogg scholarship (Note: Awarded based on the highest grade in all subjects.) for his first semester, and earning a Bachelor of Divinity in 1916. He had found his time at the university intellectually liberating, acquiring a passion for writing and abandoning his pursuit of theology in order to study history. Malone's studies were abruptly interrupted by World War I. He left Yale in 1917 to enlist in the U.S. Marine Corps after temporarily training as part of the Army YMCA at Camp Wheeler, becoming a Second lieutenant after graduating from Parris Island. However, the war ended before he saw active combat and he was discharged in January 1919. Malone then returned to Yale to obtain a doctorate in history. Later that same year, he was appointed as an instructor of history and began teaching a course in American history for undergraduates.

In 1921, Malone received his master's degree and, in 1923, earned his Doctor of Philosophy (PhD) in history. His dissertation, "The Public Life of Thomas Cooper", was awarded the John Addison Porter Prize; it had been supervised by the historian Allen Johnson, who had also been the one to recommend the topic to him. The thesis would later be used as the basis for Malone's first book, also titled The Public Life of Thomas Cooper, published in 1926. Following the completion of his doctorate, Malone was persuaded to join the faculty of the University of Virginia by its president, Edwin Alderman, during an interview at the American Historical Association and did so that same year.

== Career ==
=== Virginia and the DAB ===
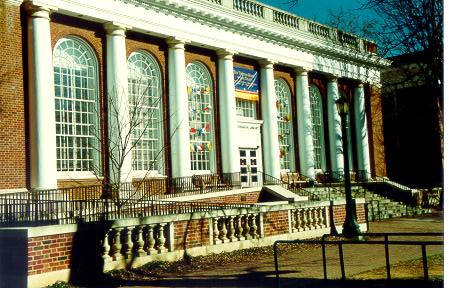
The then-Alderman Library at the University of Virginia, where Malone's office was located on the top floor for more than 25 years

In the fall of 1923, Malone assumed a position as an associate professor of history at the University of Virginia; his office was located at the top floor of the Alderman Library (now Shannon Library), where it would remain for some decades. The university had been relatively small at the time, and the whole of the history faculty consisted of just Malone and Richard Heath Dabney, the father of Virginius Dabney, upon his arrival. Dabney had been encumbered with the entirety of the history curriculum which spanned from ancient to modern. Malone undertook the courses in European and American history, giving up the courses in European history upon the arrival of Stringfellow Barr and thereafter introduced new courses in colonial history and more contemporary American history.

It was during his time at the University of Virginia that Malone began an interest in the life of Thomas Jefferson, the university's founder. In his first year, he had already authored a 14-page summary of Jefferson's life for the university's Extension Series in March 1924. (Note: Malone later recalled the work as being largely erroneous: "[the outline] was certainly no contribution to scholarship: in fact it contained errors that I afterwards found embarrassing. But it represented my first effort to view [Jefferson's] prodigious life as a whole and marked no inconsiderable increase in my own knowledge of it.") Despite doubts by Allen Johnson, his former mentor at Yale, and calls for caution by other scholars, Malone resolved to write a voluminous biography on Jefferson by the fall of 1926. The next year, he traveled to France with his newly-wed wife, Elizabeth Gifford (1898–1992), on a Sterling Traveling Fellowship to do more extensive research which formed the basis of an article entitled "Polly Jefferson and Her Father" published in the January 1931 edition of the Virginia Quarterly Review.

Malone's tenure at Virginia suddenly ended when Allen Johnson extended an offer for him to take the co-editorship of the monumental Dictionary of American Biography (DAB) in 1929. He mulled extensively over the choice, consulting friends such as Arthur M. Schlesinger Sr. and President Edwin Alderman as to whether to accept the position. After reluctantly choosing to leave the University of Virginia, Malone moved with his wife to Washington, D.C., to assist Johnson with the dictionary, a choice which he called "the most painful decision I ever made." In January 1931, Johnson was unexpectedly killed in an automobile accident that made headlines in The New York Times and The Washington Post; his death made Malone the editor-in-chief of the DAB, a capacity which Malone continued to serve in until 1936. When the dictionary was finally completed—nearly a decade later—in 1942, it contained twenty volumes with the aid of more than 2,000 fellow biographers under his guidance.

Malone found the seven years he had spent editing the DAB as being dull and tedious, stating, upon leaving, that he would never edit again. Nevertheless, he remembered the experience as being "invaluable to me as a writer because of what they taught me about precision and clarity", and would eventually return to editing later in his career. Malone's work in writing articles for the dictionary provided the foundation for his future biography on Jefferson and nurtured his interest for biography writing.

=== Harvard University Press ===
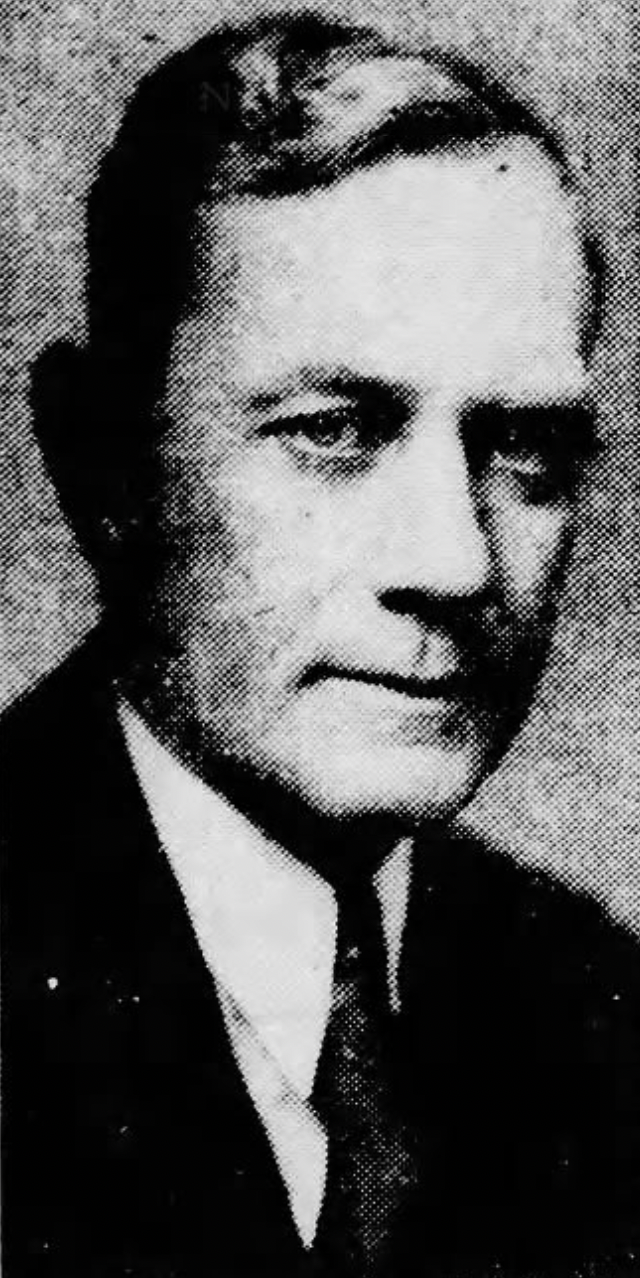
Malone pictured in the June 12, 1938, edition of the Richmond Times-Dispatch during his tenure as director of the Harvard University Press

At the recommendation of Mark Antony De Wolfe Howe, Malone was suggested as a possible candidate to serve as the third director of the Harvard University Press (HUP). Harvard President James B. Conant, persuaded by the positive appraisals of Malone from those he consulted, extended an offer for him to take the position in December 1935. Malone accepted—provided he be able to finish his time on the DAB—and was formally appointed both as editor-in-chief (director) on December 1, 1937, and as board chairman, following a vote by the Harvard Corporation. He moved with his family to Lincoln, Massachusetts.

In January of the following year, Malone described his new vision for the Press at a banquet dinner, advocating for what he called "scholarship plus"—the publication of works intended for the general public, as opposed to pieces meant exclusively for scholars. Ordered by Conant to "start from scratch", Malone instituted a number of ambitious changes which were among the most significant reforms in the Press' history: the leadership of the Printing Office was terminated, a new editorial staff was established to manage a more authoritative Press, and the old members of the Harvard Corporation resigned, giving way to the appointment of a number of prominent scholars. Conant also believed it appropriate for Malone to possess an academic title at the university and offered to name him as a professor of history, though Malone declined the post.

Malone viewed the role of the Harvard University Press as primarily an academic institution as opposed to a business. His administration of the Press achieved significant success, garnering wide recognition from the publication of several notable works—including two Pulitzer Prize-winners—and it saw a doubling in sales. His aspiration of opening up the Press to the general public fueled a reputation for producing important publications. In May 1941, Conant congratulated him, saying, "The general history of the Press for the past year is certainly one of which you may well be proud [...] Keep it up!" As the war continued, however, the Press' margins became strained by an increasing sales deficit, and the relationship between Malone and the university administration began to deteriorate over serious financial issues in the midst of World War II. William Henry Claflin Jr., Harvard's treasurer, enacted a series of cost-cutting measures which sought to limit the affairs of the HUP to be subordinate to a "strict economy;" in response, Malone appealed to university officials who, in turn, drafted a memorandum reaffirming the HUP's independence.

With a stagnant audience for academic works and student enrollment waning during the war, Malone recalled his time as director to be "basically a lame-duck leader." Mounting financial and administrative quandaries complicated his wartime directorship and diminished its reputation. When news reached Conant of a roughly $26,000 deficit the Press had accumulated during the 1942 fiscal year, his good relationship with it ended promptly. In January 1943, Malone's salary and duties were reduced; in April, a majority of officials doubted his future leadership in a vote of no-confidence. Following this rapid decline, Malone presented his letter of resignation on July 17, writing that "the major criteria by which my work is judged differ materially from those applied to the academic departments of the University." The Harvard Corporation accepted his request, and, in April 1943, Malone formally resigned his position as director in order to return to Virginia and begin work on his biography of Jefferson. He and his family moved to Charlottesville, Virginia, in the summer of that same year.

=== Return to Virginia ===
Having been relieved from his duties at Harvard, Malone dedicated his time to writing the first volume of his Jefferson biography in earnest upon returning to Virginia in 1943. Prior to his resignation as director, his ambition to write the comprehensive biography was secured on June 1, 1938, by means of a signed contract. Roger Scaife, the managing editor of Little, Brown and Company, presented the settlement for a multi-volume biography of Thomas Jefferson on March 22, 1938. Malone's personal finances, however, remained burdened after years of amassing debt despite the contract's generous payment and royalties. In early 1944, the historian Douglas Southall Freeman recommended that Malone be supplemented by a grant from the Rockefeller Foundation. Since Malone was then unaffiliated with any institution and thus unable to satisfy the requirements for the grant, UVA president John Lloyd Newcomb and the university's librarian, Harry Clemons, arranged for him to be given an honorary position so as to be affiliated with the University of Virginia. With the requirements satisfied, the Rockefeller Foundation granted a sum of $21,000 in order to fund the biography in May 1944.

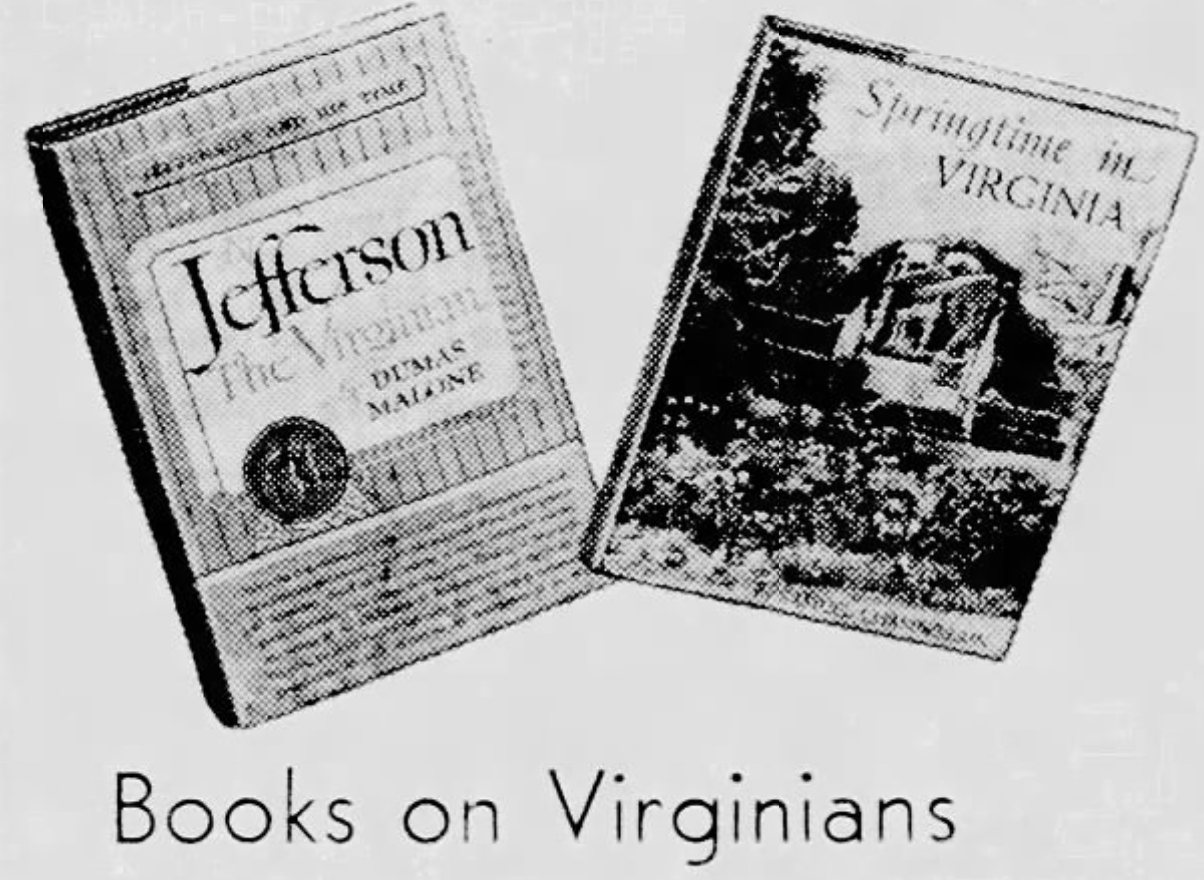
Jefferson the Virginian depicted with Samuel Chamberlain's Springtime in Virginia, from the April 25, 1948, edition of the Richmond Times-Dispatch

In the winter of 1943 and 1944, Malone was selected to be the "chief historian" of a short-lived secret committee of historians stationed at the Pentagon tasked with advising bombing policy. In 1945, John A. Krout, chairman of the History Department at Columbia University, extended an offer for him to be appointed as a professor of history at the university. Malone was at first reluctant to accept the position as it would disrupt his work on the first volume of his Jefferson biography, but accepted when the Rockefeller Foundation amended the terms of his agreement to fit a part-time teaching post. During his time teaching at Columbia, he would develop a friendship with Krout and Allan Nevins. In 1959, Malone returned to the University of Virginia as Thomas Jefferson Foundation Professor, moving over to a biographer and residence position in 1962 but remaining affiliated with the university and living in Charlottesville.

In 1947, Malone finished his first volume, Jefferson the Virginian, and published the work on Jefferson's birthday the next year. The volume achieved acclaim by scholars, and its release was well received by audiences. According to one review by historian Merle Curti writing in the Chicago Tribune, "The narrative, and this is primarily a narrative rather than an interpretive [biography], is lucid and, in places, vivid. But it is for the most part sober and straightforward. Thus 'Jefferson the Virginian' lacks the flashy, dramatic, picturesque quality which best-sellers in the [biographical] field generally have...[Although] Professor Malone makes occasional interpretations, he has tried to let the facts he has selected speak for themselves." In anticipation of the coming series, historian Thomas D. Clark wrote in a similar appraisal, "This first volume is the beginning of a biographical series of major importance which will bring Jefferson to a grateful reading public."

== Legacy and honors ==
Those who follow trends in history and biography hear in Dumas Malone the voice of a scholar whose exacting standards our age has too little patience, one who rejects easy explanations and facile judgements. [He] at once shrinks from, and rises above, the fierce and superficial certainties of our age.

— Edwin M. Yoder Jr.

Malone was elected to the American Academy of Arts and Sciences in 1936. The following year, he was awarded an honorary Doctor of Letters by Dartmouth College and the University of Rochester. In 1951 and 1958, he was awarded a Guggenheim Fellowship. In 1972, he was awarded Yale University's Wilbur L. Cross Medal and the John F. Kennedy Medal of the Massachusetts Historical Society. In 1975, he was awarded the Pulitzer Prize for History—the oldest person to receive the award at the time. In 1982, he was awarded The Award for Distinguished Service to the Humanities of the Phi Beta Kappa Society.

In 1983, President Ronald Reagan awarded Malone the Presidential Medal of Freedom. Malone was a member of the Virginia Historical Society. The trustees of the Thomas Jefferson Memorial Foundation established the Dumas Malone Graduate Research Fellowship at the University of Virginia in his honor, allotting funds to support the research of "outstanding, advanced graduate students."

When Queen Elizabeth II arrived in Charlottesville, Virginia, as part of her 1976 tour of the United States, Governor Mills Godwin gifted her the first five volumes of Jefferson and His Time—the sixth volume, The Sage of Monticello, had not yet been completed.

Malone's volumes concluded that it was impossible for Jefferson to have had a relationship with Sally Hemings.

Malone also published a set of lectures, Thomas Jefferson as Political Leader (1963), with the University of California Press.

== Personal life and death ==
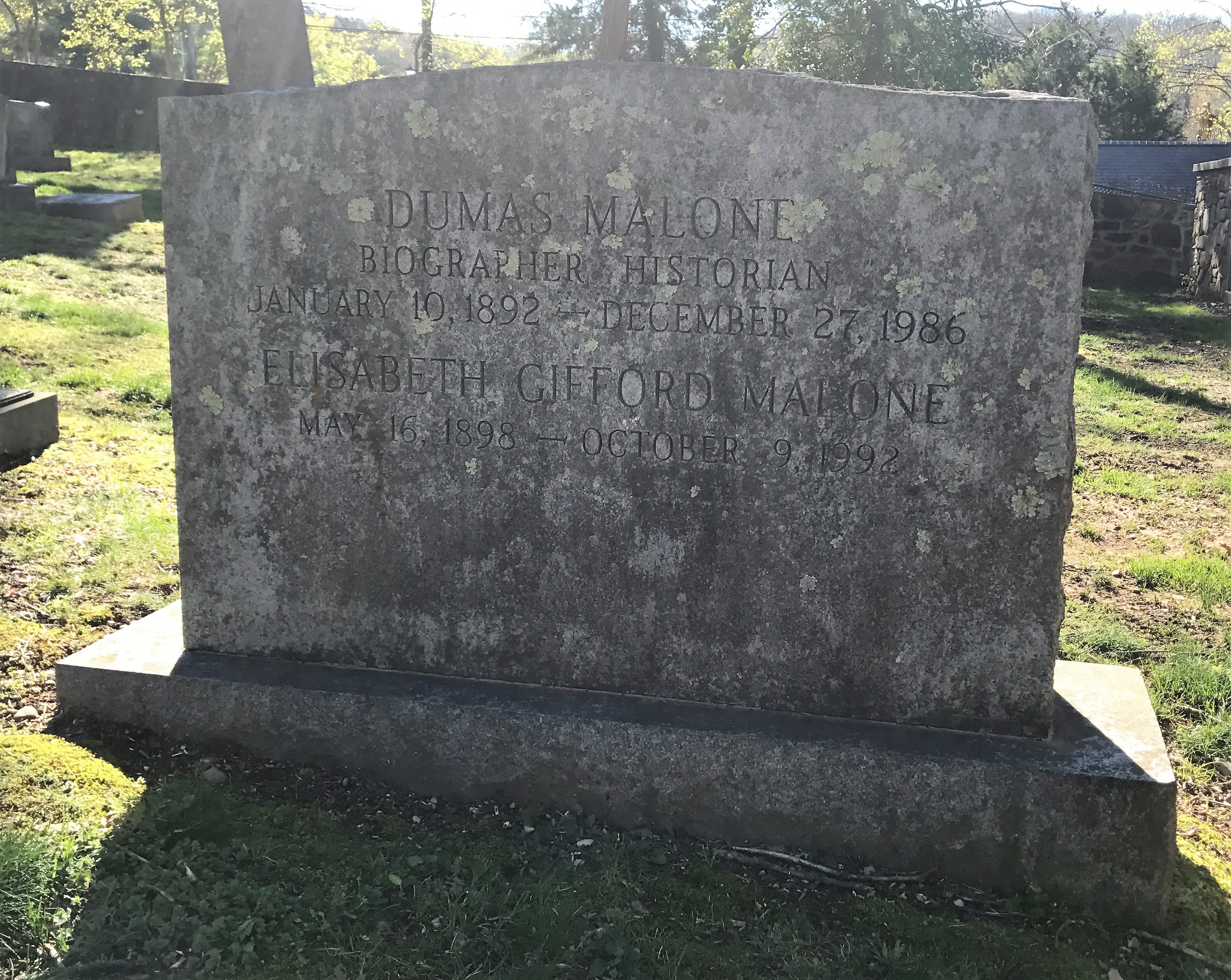
Malone's gravestone at the University of Virginia Cemetery in Charlottesville, Virginia.

Malone married Elizabeth Gifford in 1925, with whom he would have two children. He died on December 27, 1986, at his home in Charlottesville. According to the University of Virginia, the cause had been a "brief illness." He is buried at the University of Virginia Cemetery and Columbarium.

== Selected publications ==
- Malone, Dumas (1923). The Public Life of Thomas Cooper, 1783–1839 (Dissertation). New Haven, CT: Yale University Press. ISBN 978-0404591175.

=== Jefferson and His Time ===
- Malone, Dumas (30 January 1948). Jefferson the Virginian. Vol. I. Charlottesville, Virginia: Little, Brown and Company. ISBN 9780316544740. OCLC 1823927.
- Malone, Dumas (January 30, 1951). Jefferson and the Rights of Man. Vol. II. Charlottesville, Virginia: Little, Brown and Company. ISBN 9780316544733.
- Malone, Dumas (January 30, 1962). Jefferson and the Ordeal of Liberty. Vol. III. Charlottesville, Virginia: Little, Brown and Company. ISBN 9780316544757.
- Malone, Dumas (February 28, 1970). Jefferson the President: First Term, 1801–1805. Vol. IV. Charlottesville, Virginia: Little, Brown and Company. ISBN 9780316544672.
- Malone, Dumas (January 1, 1974). Jefferson the President: Second Term, 1805–1809. Vol. V. Charlottesville, Virginia: Little, Brown and Company. ISBN 978-0316544658.
- Malone, Dumas (1981). The Sage of Monticello. Vol. VI. Charlottesville, Virginia: Little, Brown and Company. ISBN 978-0813923666.
