= Little Hope, Wisconsin =

- Unincorporated community
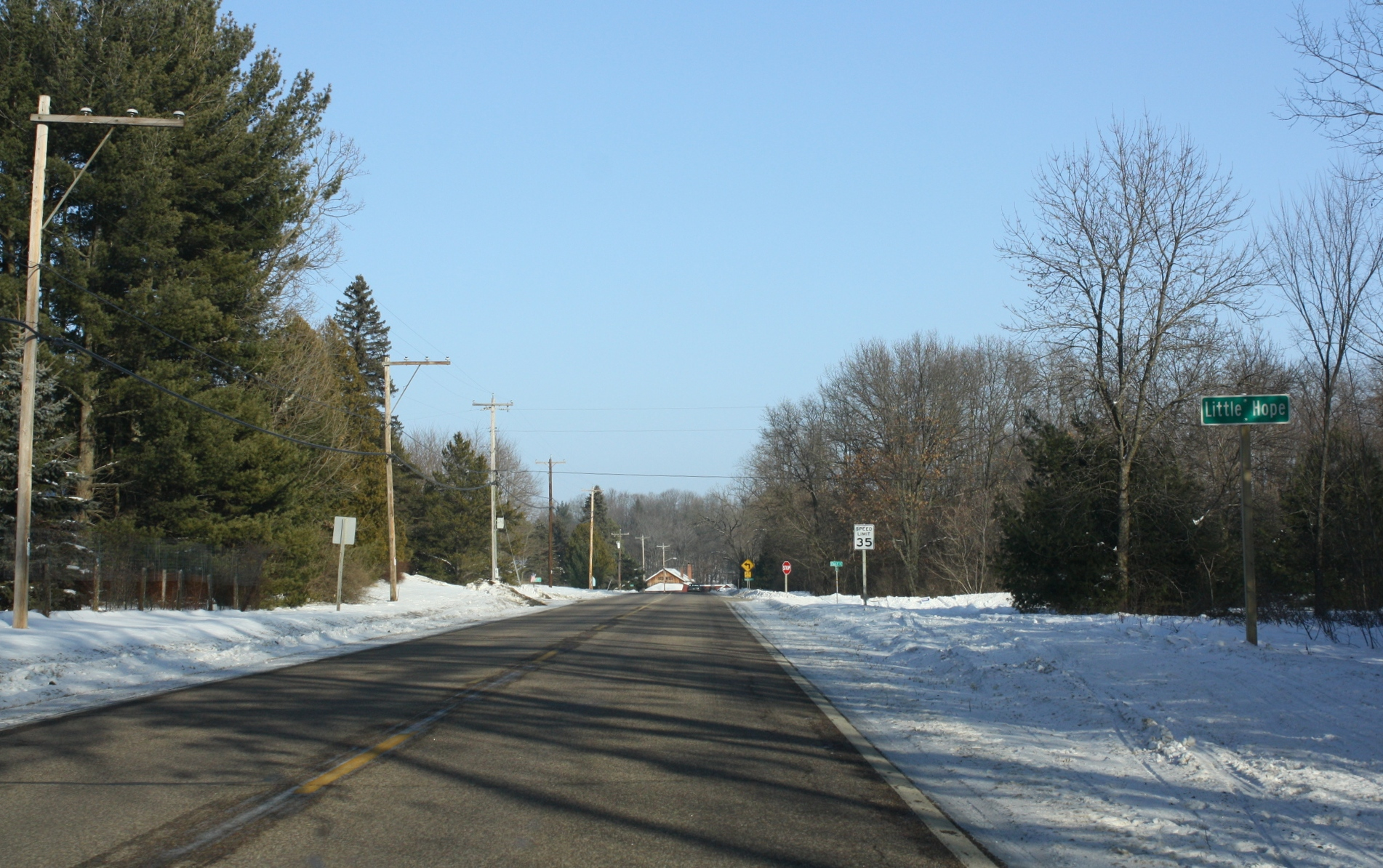
- Looking east at the sign for Little Hope

- Location within Wisconsin Location within the United States
- Coordinates: 44°19′06″N 89°06′32″W
- Country: United States
- State: Wisconsin
- County: Waupaca
- Elevation: 843 ft (257 m)
- Time zone: UTC-6 (Central (CST))
  - Summer (DST): UTC-5 (CDT)
- Area code: 920
- GNIS feature ID: 1568279

Little Hope is an unincorporated community in the town of Dayton, in Waupaca County, Wisconsin, United States. Little Hope is located on County Highway K, 3 miles (4.8 km) south-southwest of Waupaca.

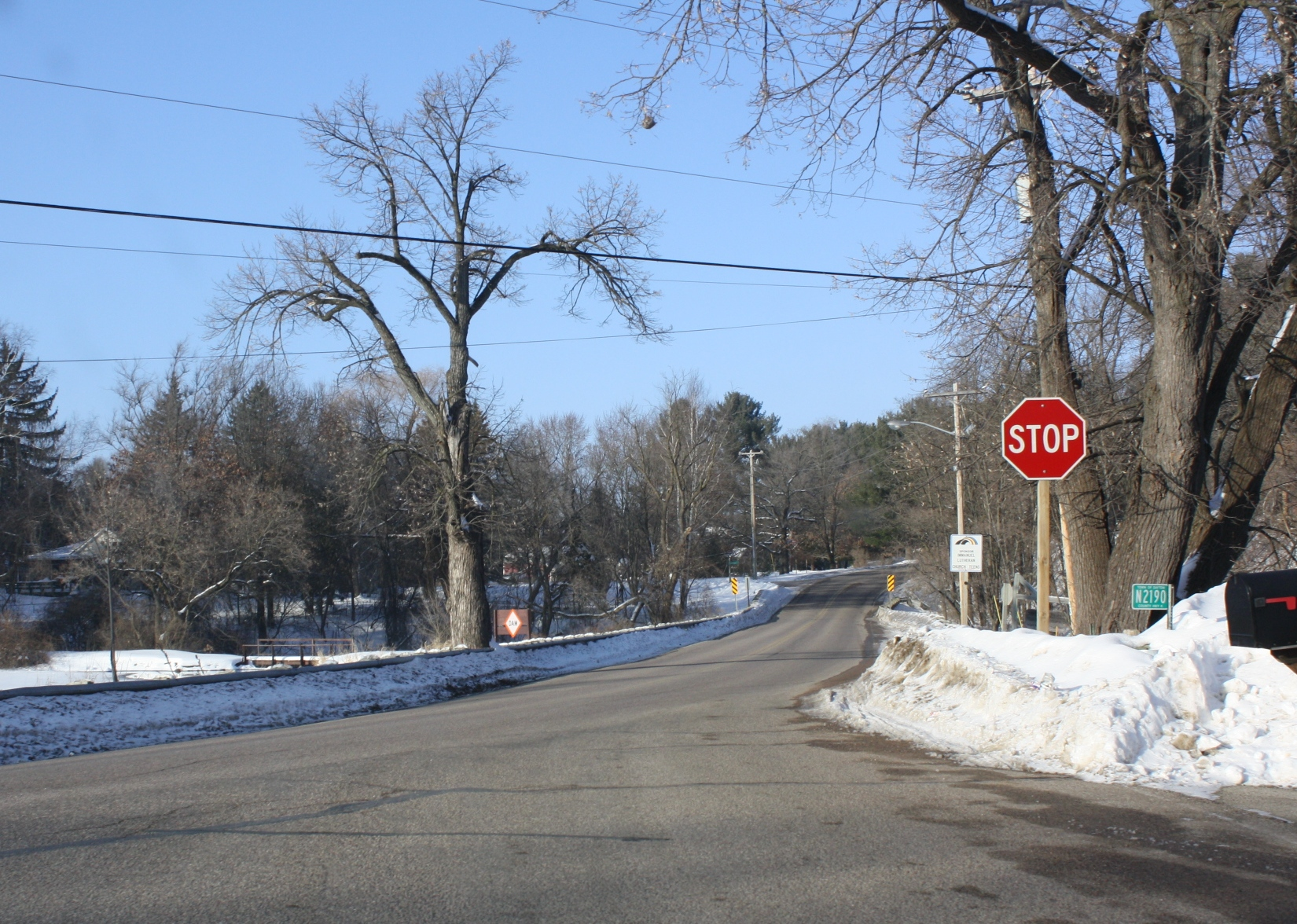
Looking north in Little Hope
