= Rural, Wisconsin =

- Unincorporated community
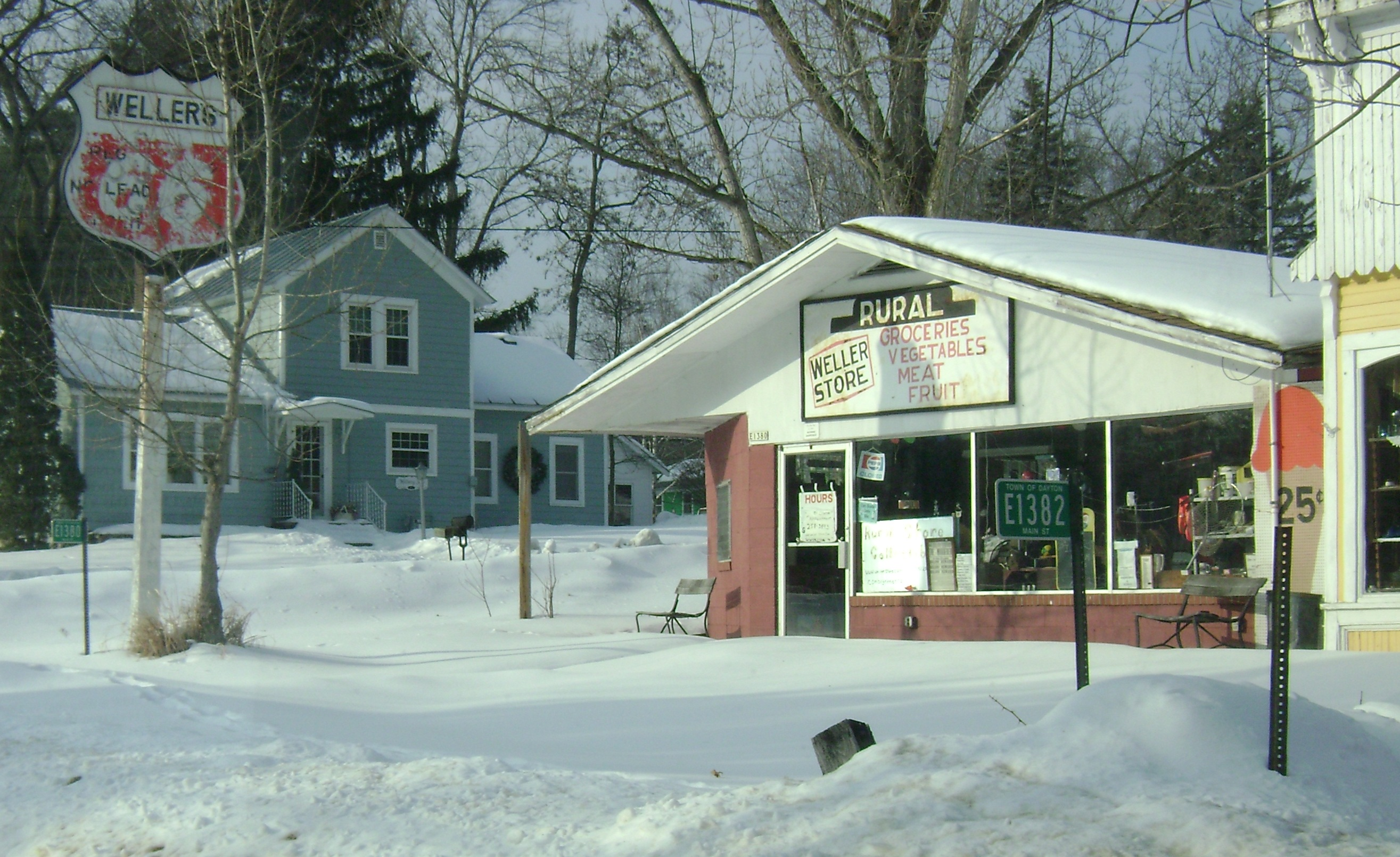
- Rural, Wisconsin

- Location within Wisconsin Location within the United States
- Coordinates: 44°18′47″N 89°09′11″W
- Country: United States
- State: Wisconsin
- County: Waupaca
- Elevation: 876 ft (267 m)
- Time zone: UTC-6 (Central (CST))
  - Summer (DST): UTC-5 (CDT)
- ZIP codes: 54981
- Area codes: 715 & 534
- GNIS feature ID: 1572728

Rural (also Nepewan, Nepowan) is an unincorporated community in the Town of Dayton, Waupaca County, Wisconsin, United States.

== History ==
Starting in 1851, Yankee settlers were drawn to the area by its potential for milling using the Crystal River. Until the mid-1870s, many settled in the area, building Greek Revival styled houses on a semi grid pattern, hoping that the expansion of the railroad would follow the well-traveled path between Berlin and Stevens Point and provide an economic boom for the town. When it bypassed Rural for Waupaca to the north, economic growth stopped and no new houses were built for 40 years.

== Notable people ==
Rural was the home town of author and poet Margaret Ashmun (1885-1940), who was born in Rural. The Ashmun family home still stands in Rural. Wisconsin State Senator and lawyer George Hudnall (1864-1936) was also born in Rural. Rural was also the birthplace and home town of Wisconsin state legislator Andrew R. Potts (1853-1932).

== Historic houses ==
Rural has been listed on the National Register of Historic Places since 1989. There are fifteen buildings contributing to the listing, along with various structures and bridges.

== Images ==
Rural, Wisconsin
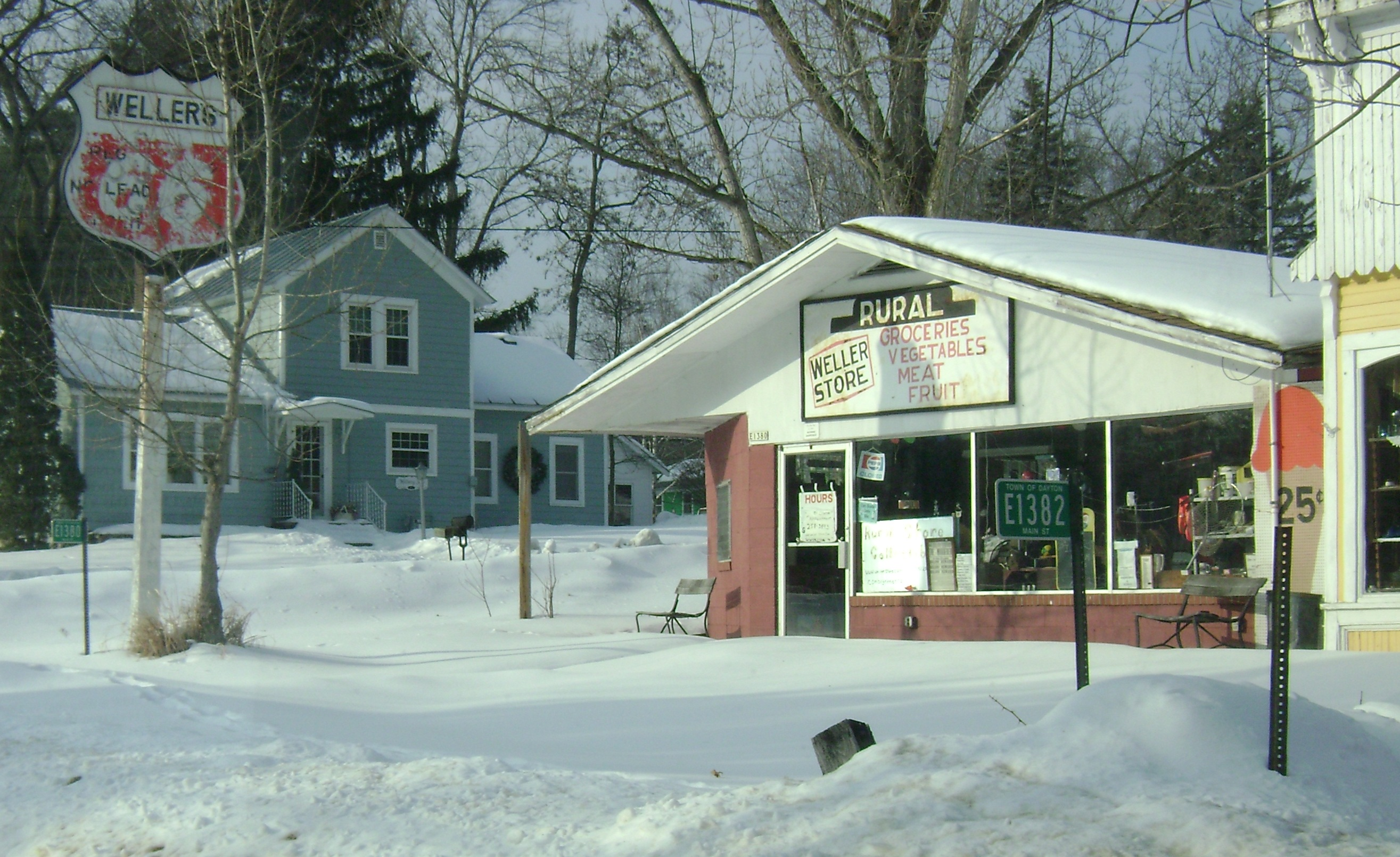
Weller Store in Rural, Wisconsin

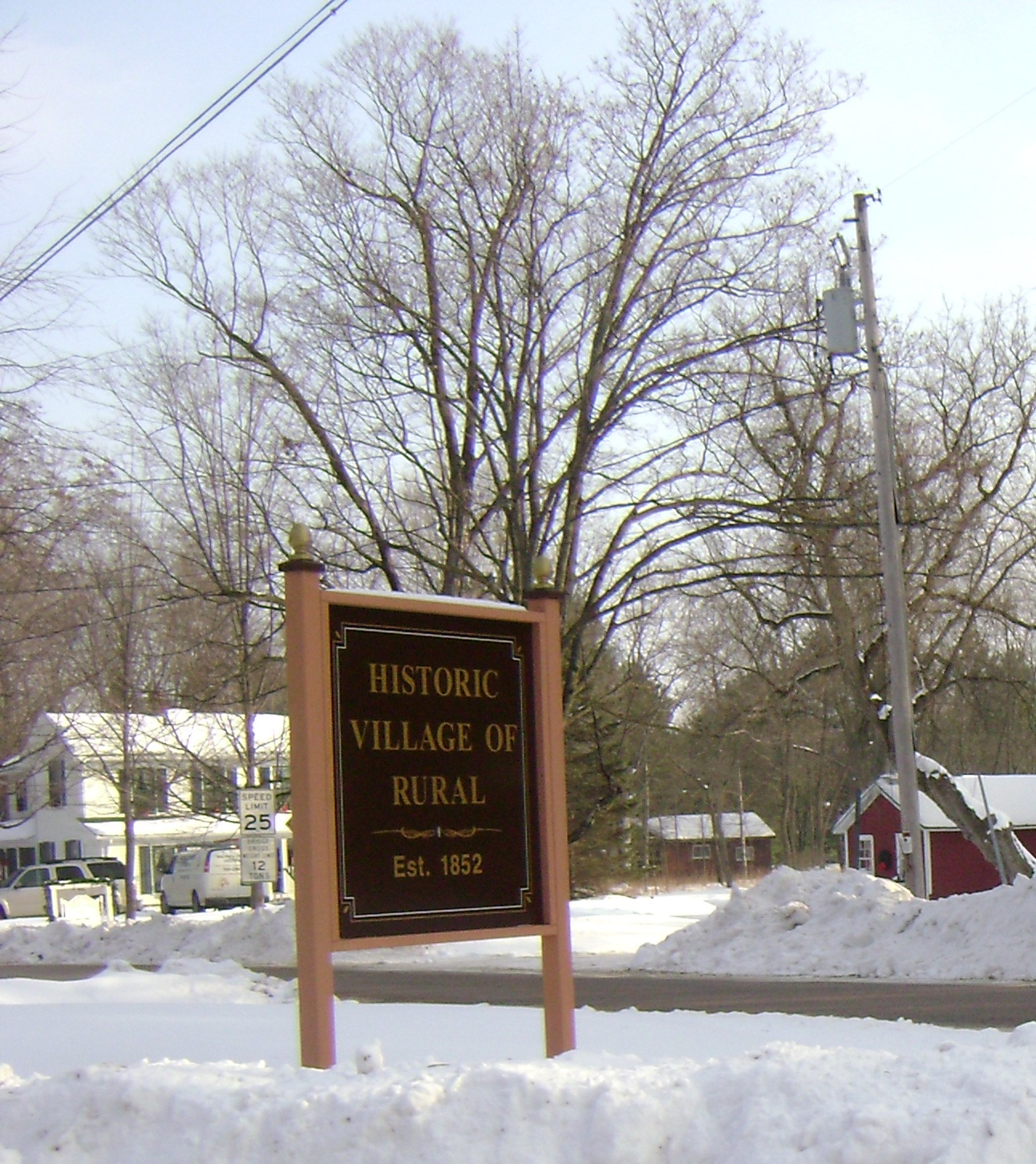
Rural, Wisconsin welcome sign

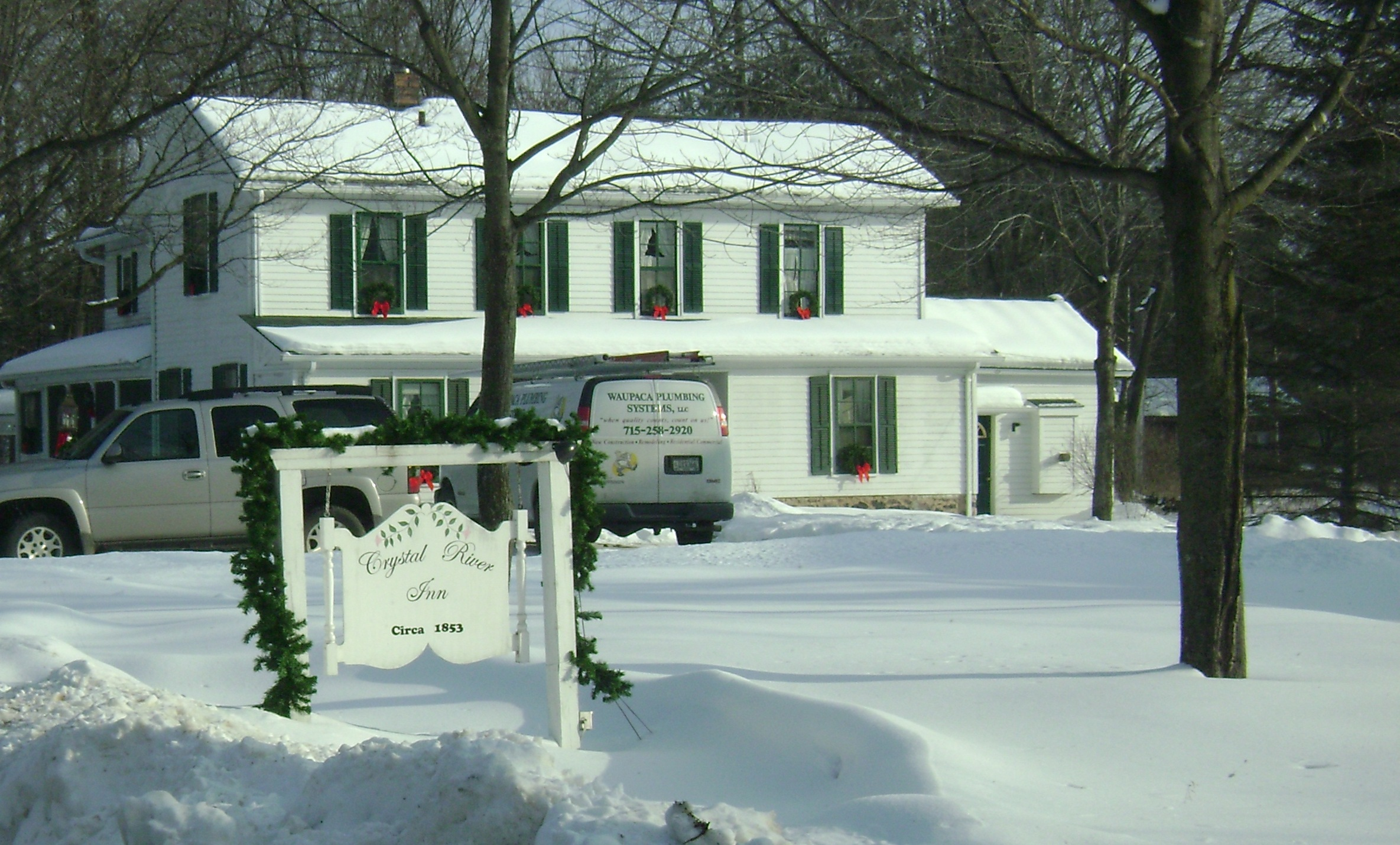
Crystal River Inn Bed & Breakfast in Rural

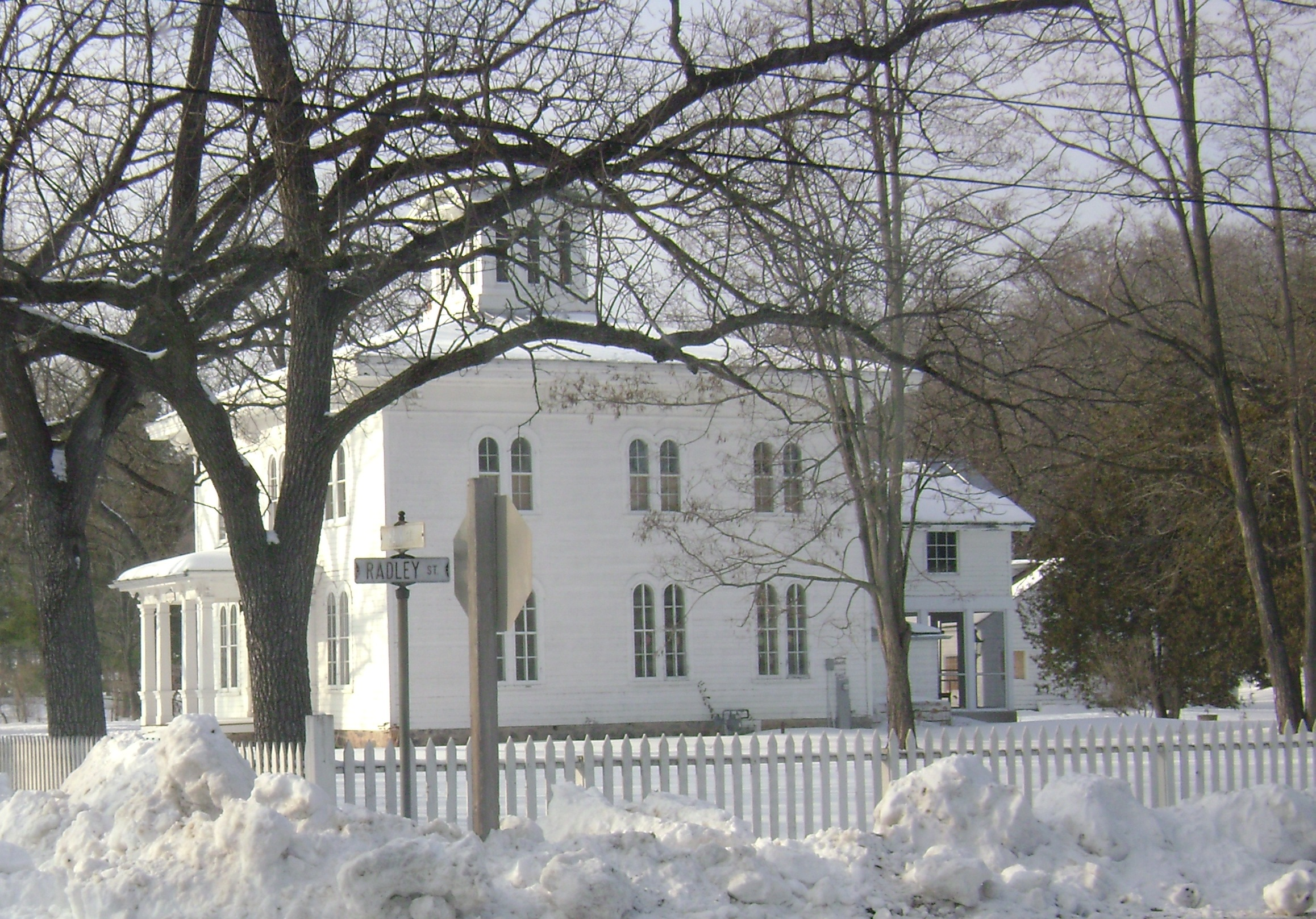
The Radley House - Part of the Rural on the Crystal Historic District
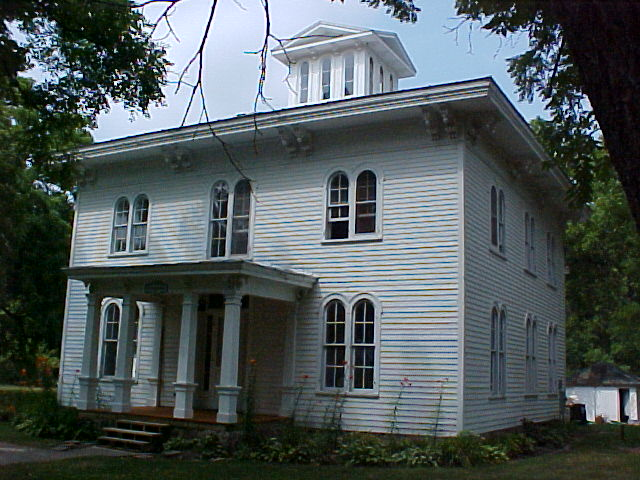
The Radley House

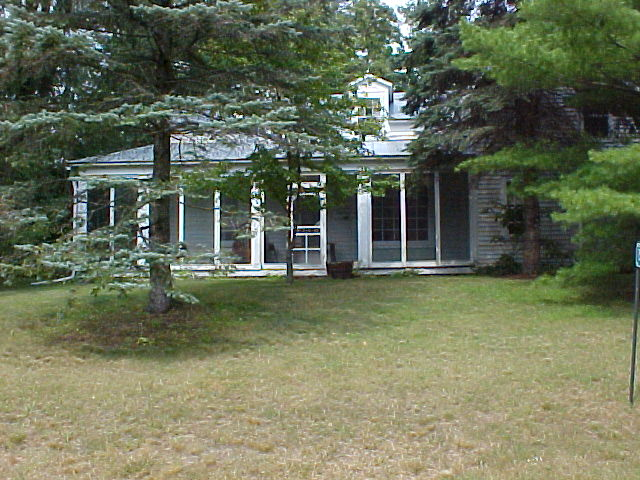
Halfway House - served as a stagecoach stop

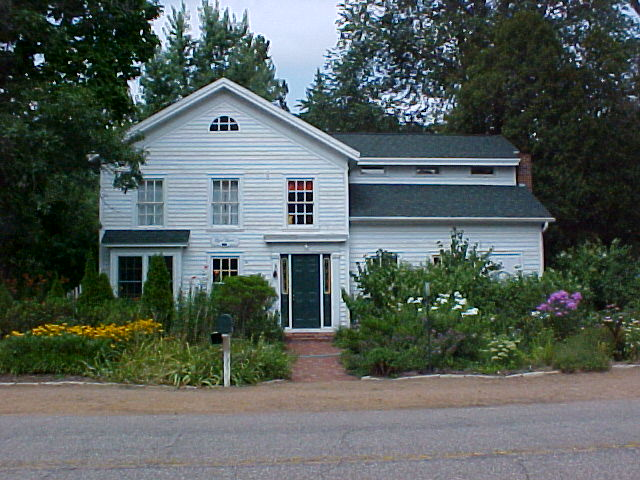
The Quint House

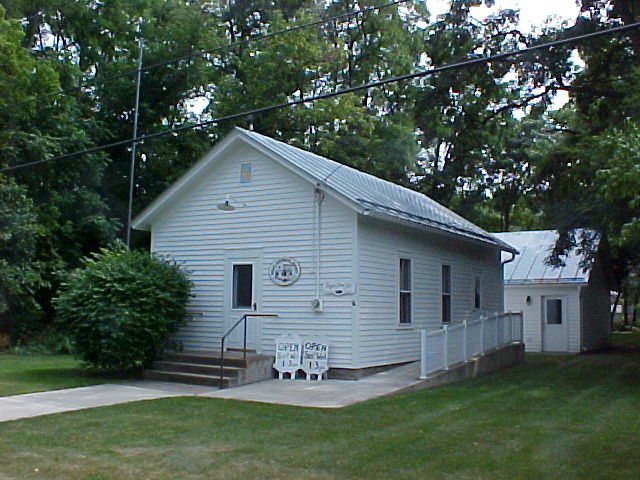
Rural Historical Society open Wednesdays and Sundays

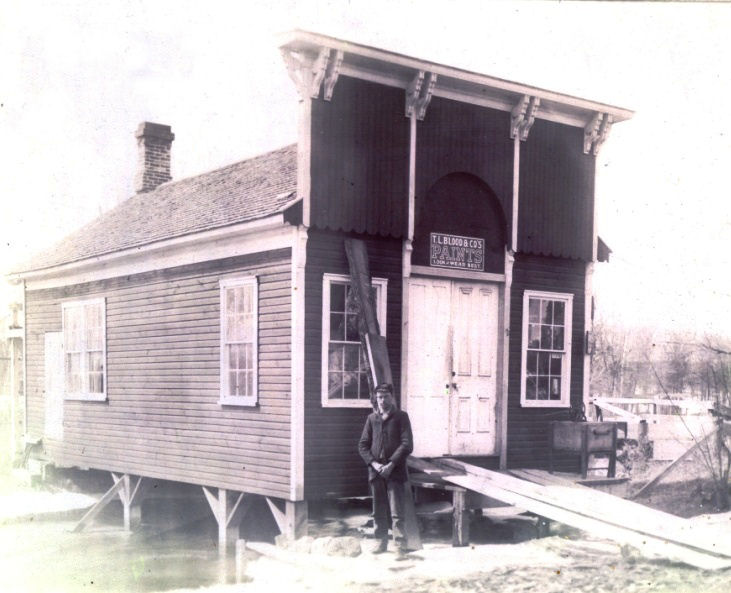
Herbert Radley stands in front of the original building, a carpentry shop, which was built in 1898 over the mill race of the Crystal River so the current could generate power. The shop was moved across the road around 1901, was painted white, and became the General Store - Then known as The Rural Store.

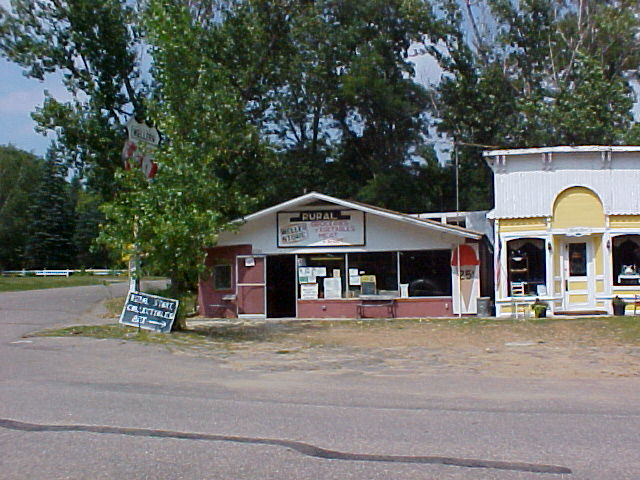
The Weller Store today - original 1800s building on right, 1960s addition on left. The oldest retail building in the Village of Rural

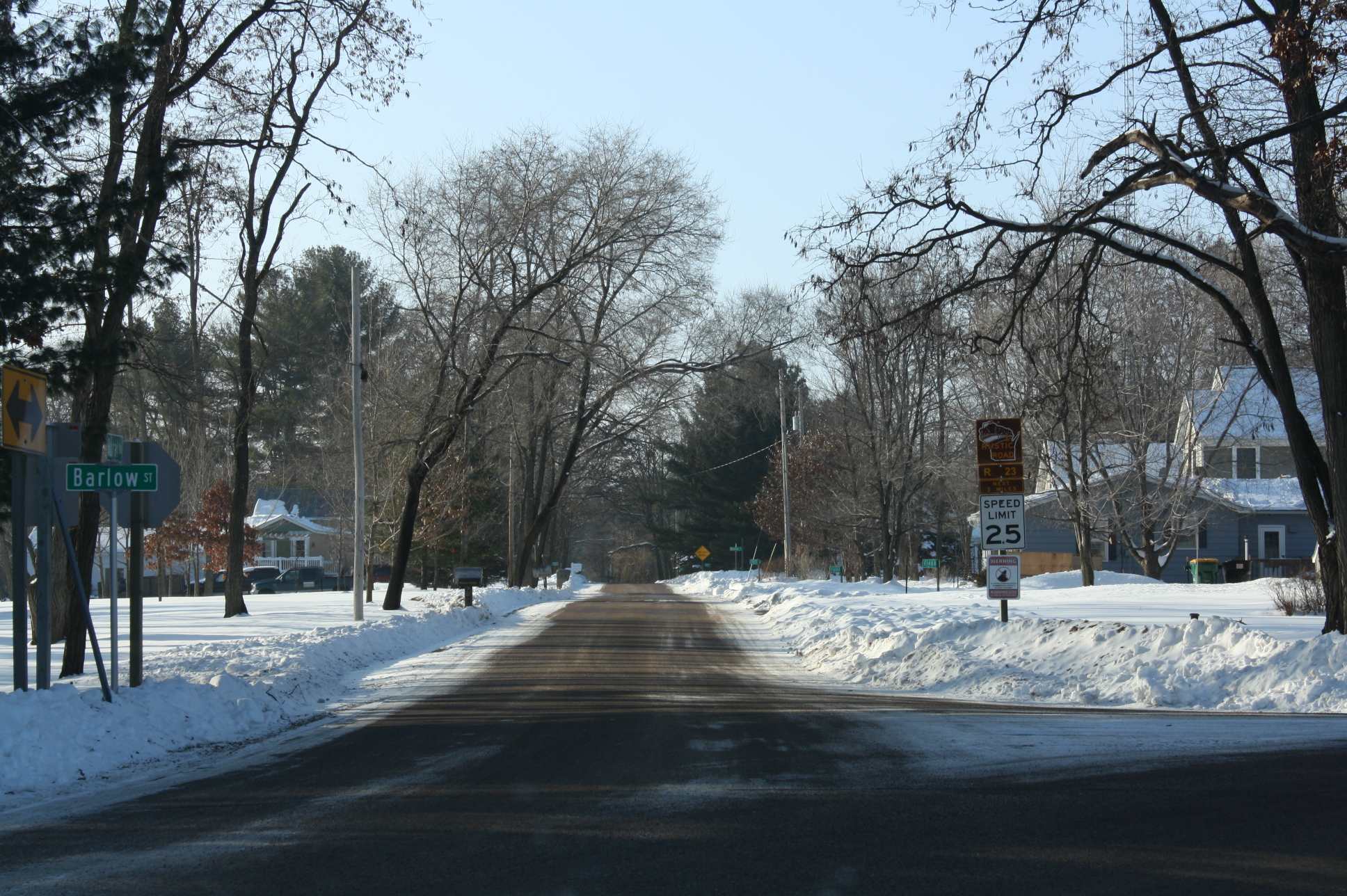
Rustic Road R23 through Rural
