= Dictionary of American Biography =

Reference work

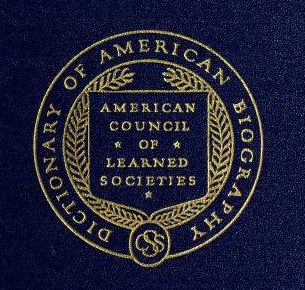
- Edited by: Allen Johnson; Dumas Malone
- Country: United States
- Language: English
- Publisher: Charles Scribner's Sons on behalf of the American Council of Learned Societies
- Published: 1928–1936 (original); 1944–1995 (supplements)
- Media type: Print
- No. of books: 30
- Followed by: American National Biography

The Dictionary of American Biography (DAB) was a multi-volume dictionary published in New York City by Charles Scribner's Sons under the auspices of the American Council of Learned Societies (ACLS).

== History ==
The dictionary was first proposed to the Council in 1920 by historian Frederick Jackson Turner. The first edition was published in 20 volumes from 1928 to 1936, appearing at a rate of two or three volumes per year. These 20 volumes contained 15,000 biographies. In 1946, the 20 volumes were released as a ten-volume set, with each of the ten volumes divided into two parts (Part 1 and Part 2) corresponding to two volumes of the first edition combined into one, the page numbering of the first edition being retained.

The ACLS appealed to Adolph Ochs, publisher of The New York Times, for funding. He loaned the Council $50,000 per year for 10 years. Ochs exercised no editorial control.

The dictionary included no biographies of the living, and some period of residence in the United States was required for inclusion. These twenty volumes had numerous quirks. For example, the entry for Mary Baker Eddy filled eight pages, the entry for Mark Twain only six and a half. Connecticut and Massachusetts were overrepresented, while Arizona had just one entry. Noticeable omissions included, among others, Sojourner Truth, Martha Washington, Scott Joplin, Charles Guiteau, and Joe Hill. In the early volumes terms such as "red men" and "savages" were occasionally used.

With the passage of time the usefulness of the series as a reference work waned. Ten supplementary volumes were issued, between 1944 and 1995, each covering people who had died after the previous supplement. The first eight supplements were produced under the auspices of the American Council of Learned Societies. By terms of an agreement signed in 1990, Macmillan was allowed to produce the final two supplements, covering people who had died through 1980, without the council's participation. (Macmillan acquired the dictionary's publisher Charles Scribner's Sons in 1984.) When Macmillan in 1993 applied to the ACLS for permission to publish a further supplement, the Council refused.

In mid 1995 Macmillan announced that it would put the old D.A.B. on CD-ROM, with updates to the existing entries as well as new biographies of people left out of the old dictionary. Professor Stanley N. Katz, then president of the council, protested that the publisher had no legal right to do so without the council's approval. Macmillan insisted that the terms of the 1927 licensing agreement with Scribner's gave it the right to publish the dictionary "in all forms." In May 1996 the American Council of Learned Societies sued Macmillan in Federal District Court in Manhattan to try to block it from publishing the D.A.B. on CD-ROM and adding what it considered unauthorized supplements. "Our client has taken the position that we want the original work preserved in its pristine form," said Lawrence S. Robbins, a lawyer representing the council. "We regard it as a treasure and we don't want it to be tinkered with. The suit says, in part, we don't want it updated, missing-personed, digitized, colorized. We want it to exist the way it is." Macmillan moved to have the lawsuit thrown out.

The ACLS signed a contract with Oxford University Press to publish a new series to be called the American National Biography, with financial support from the National Endowment for the Humanities and The Andrew W. Mellon Foundation. Macmillan, which had acquired Scribner's, decided to publish its own project supplementing the original Dictionary of American Biography, and called it The Scribner Encyclopedia of American Lives (SEAL), with Kenneth T. Jackson (who had been editor-in-chief of the DAB from 1990 to 1996) as the editor-in-chief.
