= Margaret Ashmun =

American writer

- Born: July 10, 1875; Rural, Wisconsin
- Died: March 15, 1940 (aged 64); West Springfield, Massachusetts
- Occupations: Writer, poet

Margaret Eliza Ashmun (July 10, 1875 – March 15, 1940) was an American writer from Rural, Wisconsin. She authored more than 18 novels for both adults and young readers, especially girls. Her writings also include poems and short stories. She trained as a teacher and taught for a few years then concentrated on her writing. She edited collections of short stories and writing textbooks, and wrote dozens of poems, essays, and stories that were published in the popular magazines and newspapers of her day.

== Early life ==
Margaret Ashmun was born in Rural, Waupaca County, Wisconsin, the daughter of Claude “Sam” Ashmun and Rachel Jane Smith. Jehudi Ashmun was Margaret's great uncle. Margaret was a graduate of Stevens Point College and received her bachelor's degree at the University of Wisconsin in Madison in 1904, and her M.A. in 1908. She was the head of the English Department at Stout Institute, Menomonie, Wisconsin, 1904–06, and a member of the Department of English at the University of Wisconsin 1907-12.

== Travels ==
In 1912 she went to New York City to concentrate on her writing. Besides New York City, she lived in a number of other locations in the east including Northampton, Massachusetts, and Cos Cob, Connecticut. Throughout her life she kept her home in Rural, spent some winters in Madison, and went abroad several times for considerable periods.

In 1928 she adopted a little girl, whose death ten years later was a great shock and grief to her. Margaret Ashmun died March 15, 1940, at the age of 65 in West Springfield, Massachusetts.

== Awards ==
RR Donnelley Literary Award (2009) included Margaret Ashmun as a Notable Wisconsin Author, selected by The Literary Awards Committee of the Readers’ Section of the Wisconsin Library Association. A notice appears on the Cybrary Reviews blog. Annual Margaret Ashmun Day is held in mid-June in the village of Rural, Wisconsin.

== Works ==
Textbooks

- 1910 Prose Literature for Secondary Schools, Houghton, New York, NY
- 1914 Modern Short Stories, Macmillan, New York, NY (edited by Margaret Ashmun)
- 1914 Modern Prose and Poetry for Secondary Schools, Houghton, New York, NY
- 1914 The Study and Process of Teaching Writing
- 1914 The Study and Practice of Writing English (with Gerhard Lomer)

Novels

Isabel Carleton Series (1916-1920), Reissued August 1927, November 1930, and September 1934

- 1916 Isabel Carleton’s Year, Macmillan, New York, NY
- 1917 Heart of Isabel Carleton, Macmillan, New York, NY
- 1918 Isabel Carleton’s Friends, Macmillan, New York, NY
- 1919 Isabel Carleton in the West, Macmillan, New York, NY
- 1920 Isabel Carleton at Home, Macmillan, New York, NY
- 1918 Stephen’s Last Chance, Macmillan, New York, NY
- 1920 Marion Frear’s Summer, Macmillan, New York, NY
- 1921 Topless Towers: A Romance of Morningside Heights, Macmillan, New York, NY
- 1922 Support, Macmillan, New York, NY
- 1922 Including Mother, Macmillan, New York, NY
- 1924 The Lake, Macmillan, New York, NY (published in England as The Lonely Lake by Macmillan & Co., LTD, London)
- 1925 No School Tomorrow, Macmillan, New York, NY (Reprinted Dec. 1931, 1937)
- 1926 School Keeps Today, Macmillan, New York, NY
- 1926 Brenda Stays at Home, Macmillan, New York (Reprinted Dec. 1926, June 1931, Sept. 1935, May 1938)
- 1927 Mother’s Away, Macmillan, New York, NY
- 1927 Pa: The Head of the Family, Macmillan, New York, NY
- 1929 David and the Bear Man, Macmillan, New York, NY
- 1930 Susie Sugarbeet, Houghton, New York, NY

Nonfiction

- 1931 The Singing Swan: An Account of Anna Seward and Her Acquaintance with Dr. Johnson, Boswell, and Others of Their Time, Yale University Press, New Haven, CT

Articles/Essays/Stories

- "Her Day"
- "The Humbling of Harriet"
- "Centenary of Charlotte Bronte Next Friday"
- "A Study of Temperaments As Illustrated in Literature"
- "Library Reading in the High School" I. "The Spirit and Aims of the Work" II. "Some Mechanical Details" III. "Class Methods" IV. "Personal Guidance"

Published Poems online

- "The Carpenter's Son"
- "Emily Bronte"
