= Andrew R. Potts =

American politician

Andrew R. Potts (September 19, 1853 – February 17, 1932) was an American farmer, merchant, and politician.

Born in Rural, Waupaca County, Wisconsin, in the Town of Dayton, Potts worked in a general store, as a clerk, and then farmed. Potts served as Dayton town treasurer and chairman of the Dayton Town Board. He also served on the Waupaca County Board of Supervisors and was chairman of the county board. Potts served on the school board. From 1911 to 1915, Potts served in the Wisconsin State Assembly as a Republican. Potts then served in the Wisconsin State Senate from 1915 to 1919. Potts died at his home in Rural, Wisconsin after a brief illness.
