= Chronicles of America =

50-volume series on American history

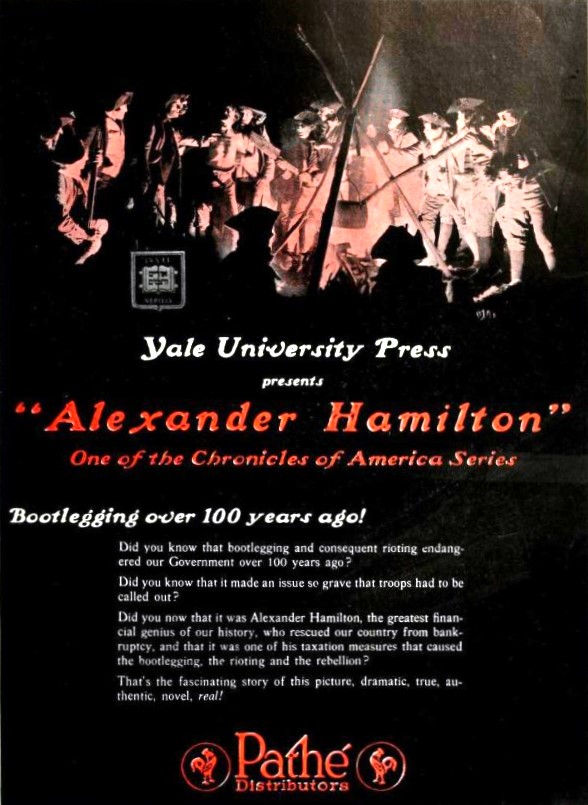
Advertisement for Alexander Hamilton (1924). Beginning in 1923, 15 films were released in the Chronicles of America series.

Chronicles of America is a 50-volume series on American history published by Yale University Press. Fifteen historical films based on the series were also commissioned. Entries in the series were first published in 1918. They were written by historians about various aspects of American history. The series was edited by Allen Johnson and published by Yale University. All 50 volumes are available on archive.org; some are available on Project Gutenberg.

The 50 volumes in the series are as follows:

1. The Red Man's Continent: A Chronicle of Aboriginal America - Ellsworth Huntington
2. The Spanish Conquerors: A Chronicle of the Dawn of Empire Overseas - Irving Berdine Richman
3. Elizabethan Sea-Dogs: A Chronicle of Drake & His Companions - William Charles Henry Wood
4. Crusaders of New France: A Chronicle of the Fleur-de-Lis in the Wilderness - William Bennett Munro
5. Pioneers of the Old South: A Chronicle of English Colonial Beginnings - Mary Johnston
6. The Fathers of New England: A Chronicle of the Puritan Commonwealth - Charles McLean Andrews
7. Dutch & English on the Hudson: A Chronicle of Colonial New York - Maud Wilder Goodwin
8. The Quaker Colonies: A Chronicle of the Proprietors of the Delaware - Sydney George Fisher
9. Colonial Folkways: A Chronicle of American Life in the Reign of the Georges - Charles M. Andrews
10. The Conquest of New France: A Chronicle of the Colonial Wars - George McKinnon Wrong
11. The Eve of the Revolution: A Chronicle of the Breach with England - Carl Lotus Becker
12. Washington & His Comrades in Arms: A Chronicle of the War of Independence - George McKinnon Wrong
13. The Fathers of the Constitution: A Chronicle of the Establishment of the Union - Max Farrand
14. Washington & His Colleagues: A Chronicle of the New Order in Politics - Henry Jones Ford
15. Jefferson & His Colleagues: A Chronicle of the Virginia Dynasty - Allen Johnson
16. John Marshall & the Constitution: A Chronicle of the Supreme Court - Edward Samuel Corwin
17. The Fight for a Free Sea: A Chronicle of the War of 1812 - Ralph Delahaye Paine
18. Pioneers of the Old Southwest: A Chronicle of the Dark & Bloody Ground - Constance Lindsay Skinner
19. The Old Northwest: A Chronicle of the Ohio Valley & Beyond - Frederic Austin Ogg
20. The Reign of Andrew Jackson: A Chronicle of the Frontier in Politics - Frederic Austin Ogg
21. The Paths of Inland Commerce: A Chronicle of Trail - Archer Butler Hulbert
22. Adventures of Oregon: A Chronicle of the Fur Trade - Constance Lindsey Skinner
23. The Spanish Borderlands: A Chronicle of Old Florida & the Southwest - Herbert Eugene Bolton
24. Texas & the Mexican War: A Chronicle of the Winning of the Southwest - Nathaniel W. Stephenson
25. The Forty-Niners: A Chronicle of the California Trail & El Dorado - Stewart Edward White
26. The Passing of the Frontier: A Chronicle of the Old West - Emerson Hough
27. The Cotton Kingdom: A Chronicle of the Old South - William Edward Dodd
28. The Anti-Slavery Crusade: A Chronicle of the Gathering Storm - Jesse Macy
29. Abraham Lincoln & the Union: A Chronicle of the Embattled North - Nathaniel W. Stephenson
30. The Day of the Confederacy: A Chronicle of the Embattled South - Nathaniel W. Stephenson
31. Captains of the Civil War: A Chronicle of the Blue & the Gray - William Charles Henry Wood
32. The Sequel of Appomattox: A Chronicle of the Reunion of the States - Walter Lynwood Fleming
33. The American Spirit in Education: A Chronicle of Great Teachers - Edward Emery Slosson
34. The American Spirit in Literature: A Chronicle of Great Interpreters - Bliss Perry
35. Our Foreigners: A Chronicle of Americans in the Making - Samuel Peter Orth
36. The Old Merchant Marine: A Chronicle of American Ships & Sailors - Ralph Delahaye Painee
37. The Age of Invention: A Chronicle of Mechanical Conquest - Holland Thompson
38. The Railroad Builders: A Chronicle of the Welding of the States - John Moody
39. The Age of Big Business: A Chronicle of the Captains of Industry - Burton J. Hendrick
40. The Armies of Labor: A Chronicle of the Organized Wage-Earners - Samuel Peter Orth
41. The Masters of Capital: A Chronicle of Wall Street - John Moody
42. The New South: A Chronicle of Social & Industrial Evolution - Holland Thompson
43. The Boss & the Machine: A Chronicle of the Politicians & Party Organization - Samuel Peter Orth
44. The Cleveland Era: A Chronicle of the New Order in Politics - Allen Johnson
45. The Agrarian Crusade: A Chronicle of the Farmer in Politics - Solon Justus Buck
46. The Path of Empire: A Chronicle of the U.S. as a World Power - Carl Russell Fish
47. Theodore Roosevelt & His Times: A Chronicle of the Progressive Movement - Harold Howland
48. Woodrow Wilson & the World War: A Chronicle of Our Own Times - Charles Seymour
49. The Canadian Dominion: A Chronicle of Our Northern Neighbor - Oscar D. Skelton
50. The Hispanic Nations of the New World: A Chronicle of Our Southern Neighbors - William R. Shepherd

== Films ==
In 1923, Yale decided to create a series of films based on the books. Fifteen films were ultimately produced.

- Columbus (1923)
- The Pilgrims (1924) directed by Edwin L. Hollywood
- The Puritans (1924)
- Dixie (1924)
