= Allen Johnson (historian) =

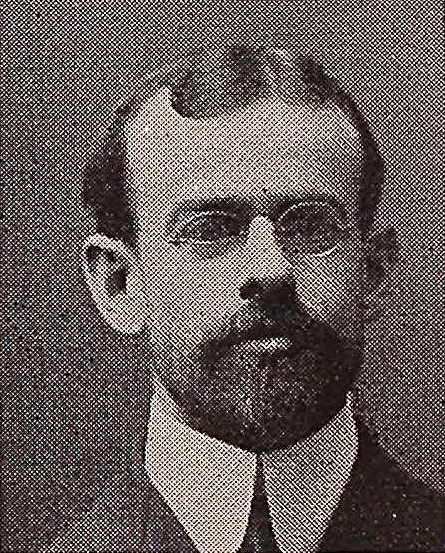
Allen Johnson, circa 1910

Allen Johnson (1870–1931) was an American historian, teacher, biographer, and editor of the Dictionary of American Biography.

== Early life and education ==
Johnson was born in Lowell, Massachusetts, where his father, Moses Allen Johnson (whose ancestor came to Massachusetts in 1630) worked for the Lowell Felting Mills. His mother was Elmira Shattuck. Johnson was the valedictorian of his high school in 1888, and then attended Amherst College, graduating in 1892.

After graduation, he taught history and English at the Lawrenceville School in New Jersey from 1892 until 1894, and then held a graduate fellowship at Amherst University, reading philosophy and history. Johnson spent the years 1895 to 1897 studying history in Europe, with three semesters at the University of Leipzig (under Karl Gotthard Lamprecht and Erich Marcks), and one semester in Paris at the École Libre des Sciences Politiques. Johnson then finished his Ph.D. at Columbia University under James Harvey Robinson, with a dissertation entitled The Intendant as a Political Agent under Louis XIV (1899).

== Academic career and death ==
Johnson began teaching history at Iowa College (now Grinnell College) in 1898. He left in 1905 to teach history and political science at Bowdoin College. In 1910, Johnson joined the faculty at Yale University, where he was appointed Larned Professor of American History. While on the Yale history faculty, Johnson published an article supporting the constitutionality of the fugitive slave act of 1850. An interpretation of the article is that it was part of the movement to reconcile North and South, while supporting the southern side in arguments about the Constitution.

Johnson's work as editor of the fifty-volume Chronicles of America series, which was acclaimed for its scholarship and high standards, led to his invitation from the American Council of Learned Societies to edit the proposed Dictionary of American Biography, which led Johnson to leave his position at Yale in 1926 and move to Washington, DC, to oversee work on the DAB. After a few years, Johnson invited his former student from Yale, Dumas Malone, to become assistant editor of the project.

Walking home on the evening of January 18, 1931, Johnson tried to cross a street against traffic and was struck by an automobile, whose driver brought him to the hospital, where he was pronounced dead within an hour of the accident. Dumas Malone was named to succeed him as DAB editor.

Aside from serving as editor of the Chronicles of America series and the Dictionary of American Biography, Johnson was also the author of Stephen A. Douglas: A Study in American Politics (1908), Readings in American Constitutional History, 1776–1876 (1912), Union and Democracy (1915), The Historian and Historical Evidence (1926), and Readings in Recent American Constitutional History, 1876–1926 (1927). His Jefferson and His Colleagues (1921) was published in the Chronicles of America series.

== Personal life ==
Johnson married Helen K. Ross on June 20, 1900, in Germantown, Pennsylvania. She died in 1921. They had one son, Allen S. Johnson.
