= George Hudnall =

American politician

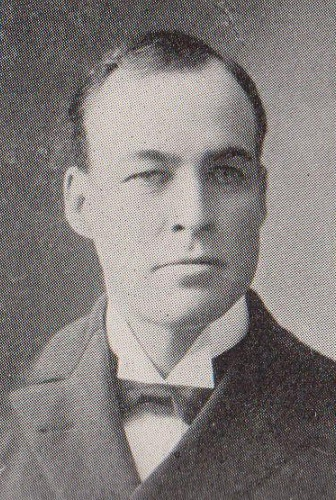

Member of the Wisconsin Senate from the 11th district
- In office 1903–1911

Personal details
- Born: January 9, 1864 Rural, Wisconsin
- Died: October 1, 1936 (aged 72)
- Party: Republican

George B. Hudnall was a Republican member of the Wisconsin State Senate.

== Biography ==
Hudnall was born on January 9, 1864, in Rural, Wisconsin. He lived on a farm until he was 24 years old, when he began teaching and took up the study of law. He graduated from the University of Wisconsin Law School and practiced law in Superior, Wisconsin, and Milwaukee, Wisconsin. He died on October 1, 1936, at his home.

== Political career ==
Hudnall was a member of the Senate from 1903 to 1911. Previously, he was City Attorney of Superior from 1900 to 1902. He was a Republican.
