= New Haven, Wisconsin =

New Haven is the name of some places in the U.S. state of Wisconsin:

- New Haven, Adams County, Wisconsin, a town
- New Haven, Dunn County, Wisconsin, a town
