= Dellwood, Wisconsin =

Dellwood, Wisconsin may refer to:

- Dellwood, Adams County, Wisconsin, an unincorporated community in Adams County, Wisconsin
- Dellwood, Sauk County, Wisconsin, an unincorporated community in Sauk County, Wisconsin
