= Lyndon, Wisconsin =

Lyndon is the name of several places in the U.S. state of Wisconsin:

- Lyndon Station, Wisconsin, a village
- Lyndon, Juneau County, Wisconsin, a town
- Lyndon, Sheboygan County, Wisconsin, a town
