= Indian Heights, Wisconsin =

Indian Heights, Wisconsin may refer to:

- Indian Heights, Dane County, Wisconsin, an unincorporated community
- Indian Heights, Juneau County, Wisconsin, an unincorporated community
