= Newport, Wisconsin =

Town of Newport
- Town
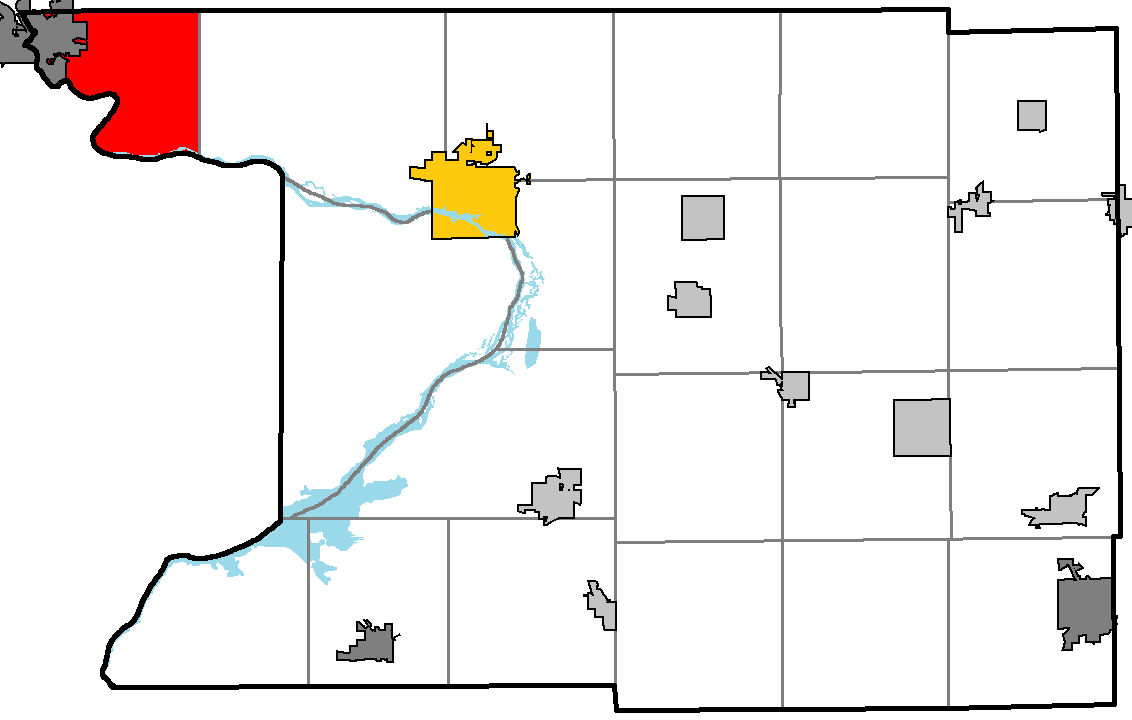
- Location of the Town of Newport, within Columbia County, Wisconsin

- Location of Columbia County, Wisconsin
- Coordinates: 43°36′18″N 89°43′3″W
- Country: United States
- State: Wisconsin
- County: Columbia

Area
  - Total: 22.1 sq mi (57.2 km^{2})
  - Land: 21.5 sq mi (55.6 km^{2})
  - Water: 0.58 sq mi (1.5 km^{2})
- Elevation: 850 ft (260 m)

Population (2020)
  - Total: 607
  - Density: 28.3/sq mi (10.9/km^{2})
- Time zone: UTC-6 (Central (CST))
  - Summer (DST): UTC-5 (CDT)
- FIPS code: 55-57025
- GNIS feature ID: 1583815
- Website: https://townofnewport.wi.gov/

The Town of Newport is located in Columbia County, Wisconsin, United States. The population was 607 at the 2020 census. The ghost town of Moe Settlement was located in the town.

== Geography ==
According to the United States Census Bureau, the town has a total area of 22.1 square miles (57.2 km^{2}), of which 21.5 square miles (55.6 km^{2}) is land and 0.6 square mile (1.5 km^{2}) (2.67%) is water.

== Demographics ==
As of the census of 2000, there were 681 people, 278 households, and 192 families residing in the town. The population density was 31.7 people per square mile (12.2/km^{2}). There were 334 housing units at an average density of 15.6 per square mile (6/km^{2}). The racial makeup of the town was 97.94% White, 0.59% African American, 1.03% Native American and 0.44% Asian. Hispanic or Latino people of any race were 0.59% of the population.

There were 278 households, out of which 29.5% had children under the age of 18 living with them, 59.4% were married couples living together, 7.2% had a female householder with no husband present, and 30.6% were non-families. 25.5% of all households were made up of individuals, and 7.2% had someone living alone who was 65 years of age or older. The average household size was 2.45 and the average family size was 2.95.

In the town, the population was spread out, with 24.7% under the age of 18, 4.8% from 18 to 24, 28.5% from 25 to 44, 24.8% from 45 to 64, and 17.2% who were 65 years of age or older. The median age was 40 years. For every 100 females, there were 94 males. For every 100 females age 18 and over, there were 90 males.

The median income for a household in the town was $45,833, and the median income for a family was $52,000. Males had a median income of $35,781 versus $20,156 for females. The per capita income for the town was $19,390. About 4.5% of families and 5.7% of the population were below the poverty line, including 5% of those under age 18 and 6.7% of those age 65 or over.

== Education ==
Newport lies within the service area of the School District of Wisconsin Dells, which operates Spring Hill Middle School and Wisconsin Dells High School.

== Notable people ==
- Charles A. Cady, member of the Wisconsin State Assembly
- Frank A. Cady, lawyer, member of the Wisconsin State Assembly
