= Jackson, Burnett County, Wisconsin =

Jackson, Wisconsin
- Town
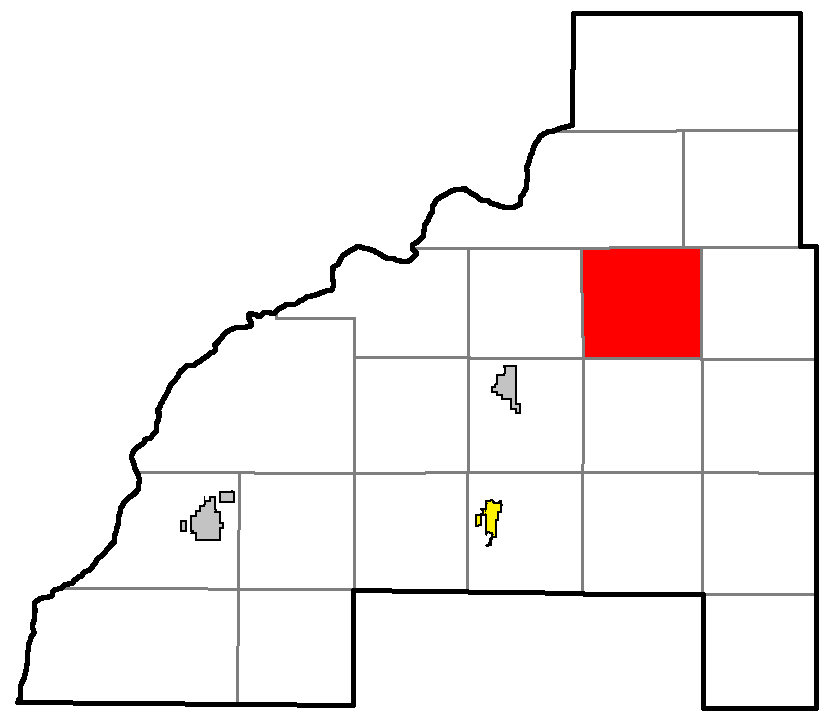
- Location of Jackson, within Burnett County
- Coordinates: 45°56′29″N 92°12′28″W
- Country: United States
- State: Wisconsin
- County: Burnett

Area
  - Total: 34.9 sq mi (90.5 km^{2})
  - Land: 29.2 sq mi (75.7 km^{2})
  - Water: 5.7 sq mi (14.8 km^{2})
- Elevation: 1,007 ft (307 m)

Population (2020)
  - Total: 935
  - Density: 32.0/sq mi (12.4/km^{2})
- Time zone: UTC-6 (Central (CST))
  - Summer (DST): UTC-5 (CDT)
- Area codes: 715 & 534
- FIPS code: 55-37650
- GNIS feature ID: 1583442
- Website: www.townofjacksonwi.com

There are some other places named Jackson in Wisconsin.

Jackson is a town in Burnett County in the U.S. state of Wisconsin. The population was 935 at the 2020 census.

== Geography ==
Jackson is located northeast of the center of Burnett County. According to the United States Census Bureau, the town has a total area of 34.9 square miles (90.5 km^{2}), of which 29.2 square miles (75.7 km^{2}) is land and 5.7 square miles (14.8 km^{2}), or 16.37%, is water.

== Demographics ==
As of the census of 2000, there were 765 people, 347 households, and 260 families residing in the town. The population density was 26.3 people per square mile (10.1/km^{2}). There were 1,031 housing units at an average density of 35.4 per square mile (13.7/km^{2}). The racial makeup of the town was 93.46% White, 1.31% African American, 2.35% Native American, 1.31% Asian, and 1.57% from two or more races. Hispanic or Latino of any race were 0.39% of the population.

There were 347 households, out of which 16.1% had children under the age of 18 living with them, 68.0% were married couples living together, 5.5% had a female householder with no husband present, and 24.8% were non-families. 20.7% of all households were made up of individuals, and 9.2% had someone living alone who was 65 years of age or older. The average household size was 2.20 and the average family size was 2.50.

In the town, the population was spread out, with 15.3% under the age of 18, 4.7% from 18 to 24, 15.6% from 25 to 44, 35.2% from 45 to 64, and 29.3% who were 65 years of age or older. The median age was 54 years. For every 100 females, there were 106.2 males. For every 100 females age 18 and over, there were 107.0 males.

The median income for a household in the town was $35,119, and the median income for a family was $40,556. Males had a median income of $36,250 versus $20,357 for females. The per capita income for the town was $18,844. About 7.2% of families and 8.5% of the population were below the poverty line, including 12.8% of those under age 18 and 4.7% of those age 65 or over.
