= Springville, Wisconsin =

- Town
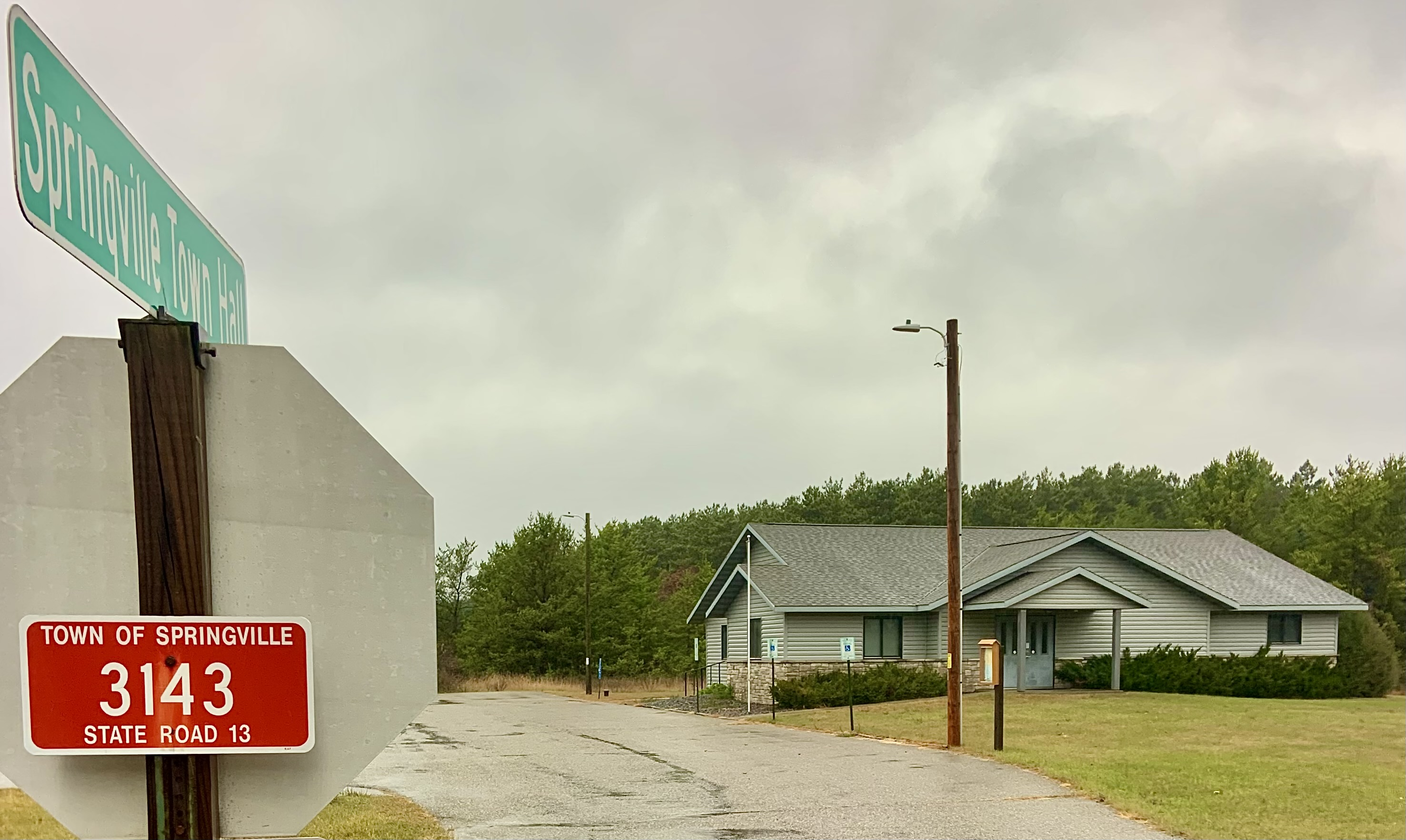
- Town hall

- Location in Adams County and the state of Wisconsin.
- Coordinates: 43°46′41″N 89°48′45″W
- Country: United States
- State: Wisconsin
- County: Adams

Area
  - Total: 44.7 sq mi (115.8 km^{2})
  - Land: 43.7 sq mi (113.1 km^{2})
  - Water: 1.0 sq mi (2.7 km^{2})
- Elevation: 981 ft (299 m)

Population (2020)
  - Total: 1,283
  - Density: 29.38/sq mi (11.34/km^{2})
- Time zone: UTC-6 (Central (CST))
  - Summer (DST): UTC-5 (CDT)
- Area code: 608
- FIPS code: 55-76350
- GNIS feature ID: 1584205
- Website: townofspringville.com

Springville is a town in Adams County in the U.S. state of Wisconsin. The population was 1,283 at the 2020 census, down from 1,318 at the 2010 census.

== Geography ==
Springville is located at 43°46′40″N 89°47′14″W (43.778050, −89.787360).

According to the United States Census Bureau, the town has a total area of 44.7 square miles (115.8 km^{2}), of which 43.7 square miles (113.1 km^{2}) is land and 1.0 square mile (2.7 km^{2}), or 2.33%, is water.

== Demographics ==
Historical population
Census	Pop.	Note	%±
1870	386		—
1880	437		13.2%
1890	474		8.5%
1900	568		19.8%
1910	511		−10.0%
1920	466		−8.8%
1930	367		−21.2%
1940	385		4.9%
1950	360		−6.5%
1960	368		2.2%
1970	449		22.0%
1980	584		30.1%
1990	785		34.4%
2000	1,167		48.7%
2010	1,318		12.9%
2020	1,283		−2.7%
U.S. Decennial Census

As of the census of 2000, there were 1,167 people, 487 households, and 349 families residing in the town. The population density was 26.6 people per square mile (10.3 people/km^{2}). There were 864 housing units at an average density of 19.7 units per square mile (7.6 units/km^{2}). The racial makeup of the town was 98.20% White, 0.17% African American, 0.17% Native American, 0.17% Asian, 0.09% Pacific Islander, 0.17% from other races, and 1.03% from two or more races. Hispanic or Latino of any race were 1.29% of the population.

There were 487 households, out of which 24.6% had children under the age of 18 living with them, 61.2% were married couples living together, 6.0% had a female householder with no husband present, and 28.3% were non-families. 23.0% of all households were made up of individuals, and 8.0% had someone living alone who was 65 years of age or older. The average household size was 2.40 and the average family size was 2.78.

In the town, the population was spread out, with 21.2% under the age of 18, 5.7% from 18 to 24, 26.4% from 25 to 44, 28.5% from 45 to 64, and 18.3% who were 65 years of age or older. The median age was 43 years. For every 100 females, there were 107.7 males. For every 100 females age 18 and over, there were 103.1 males.

The median income for a household in the town was $34,531, and the median income for a family was $38,000. Males had a median income of $30,529 versus $22,760 for females. The per capita income for the town was $16,146. About 9.8% of families and 12.3% of the population were below the poverty line, including 20.4% of those under age 18 and 11.0% of those age 65 or over.

== Education ==
The northern part is in the Adams-Friendship Area School District, while the southern part is in the service area of the School District of Wisconsin Dells, which operates Spring Hill Middle School and Wisconsin Dells High School.
