= Wisconsin Dells High School =

Coordinates: 43.637°N 89.792°W

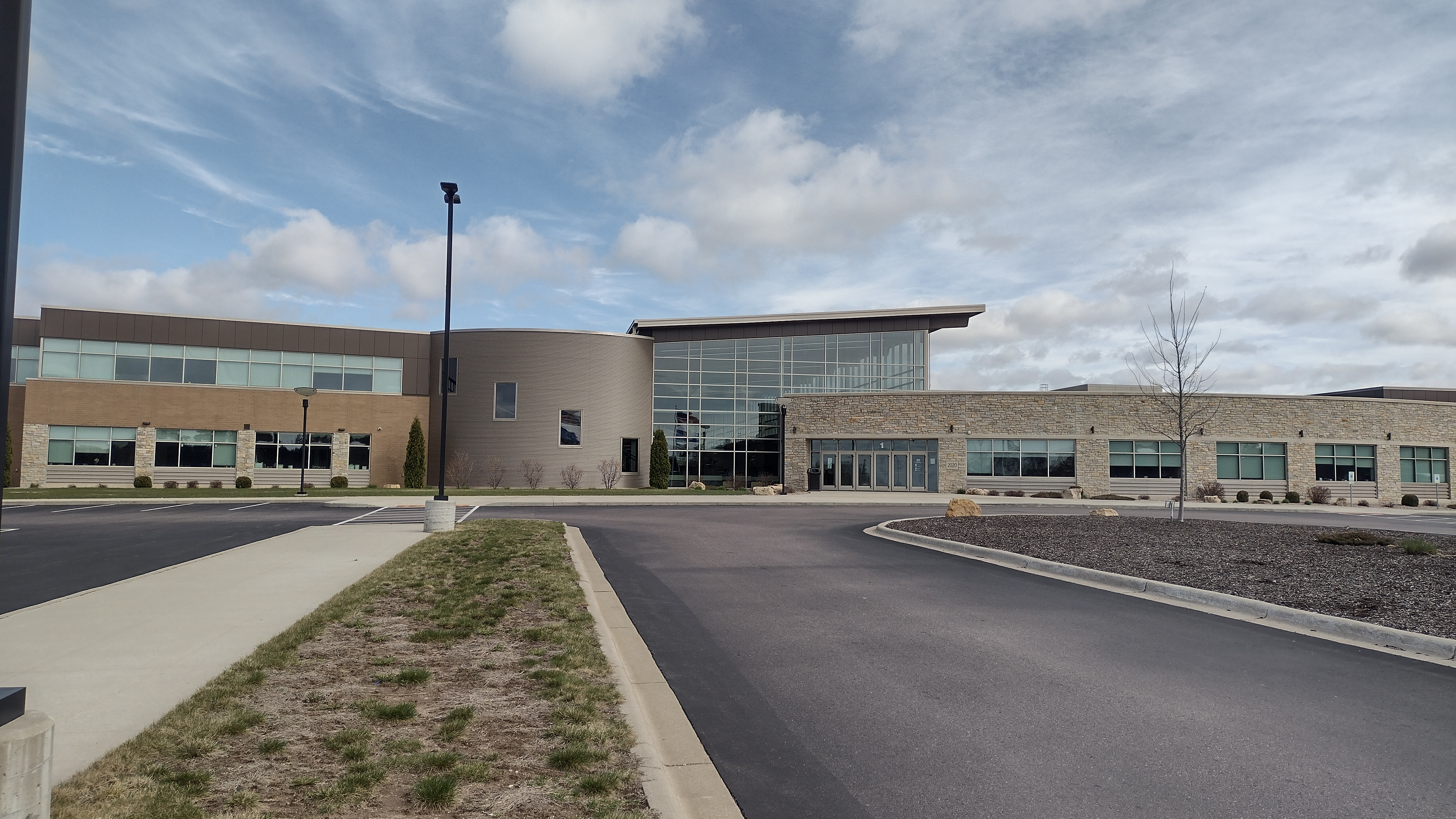

Location
- 1501 Brew Farm Road; Wisconsin Dells, Sauk County, Wisconsin 53965; United States

Information
- Type: Public high school
- Principal: Allison Hoch
- Teaching staff: 33.81 (FTE)
- Enrollment: 577 (2023-2024)
- Student to teacher ratio: 17.07
- Colors: Columbia blue and white
- Fight song: "Michigan State Fight Song"
- Athletics conference: South Central
- Nickname: Chiefs
- Website: wdhs.sdwd.k12.wi.us

Wisconsin Dells High School is a public high school located in Wisconsin Dells, Wisconsin, and is a part of the Wisconsin Dells School District. It serves more than 600 students from the municipalities of Wisconsin Dells, Dell Prairie, Dellona, Delton, Jackson, Lake Delton, Lyndon, New Haven, Newport, and Springville.

== History ==
The original high school building was built in the 1960s. In 2020, a new high school building opened on Brew Farm Road, on donated land by Kalahari Resorts owner Todd Nelson.

== Athletics ==
Wisconsin Dells is in the South Central Athletic Conference. Athletics offered include:

Boys'	Girls'
Baseball	Softball
Basketball	Basketball
Football	Volleyball
Ice Hockey	Track & Field
Soccer	Soccer
Wrestling	

=== Athletic conference affiliation history ===
- Juneau County League (1932-1939)
- South Central Conference (1939-1941)
- Southern Ten Conference (1941-1952)
- South Central Conference (1952–present)

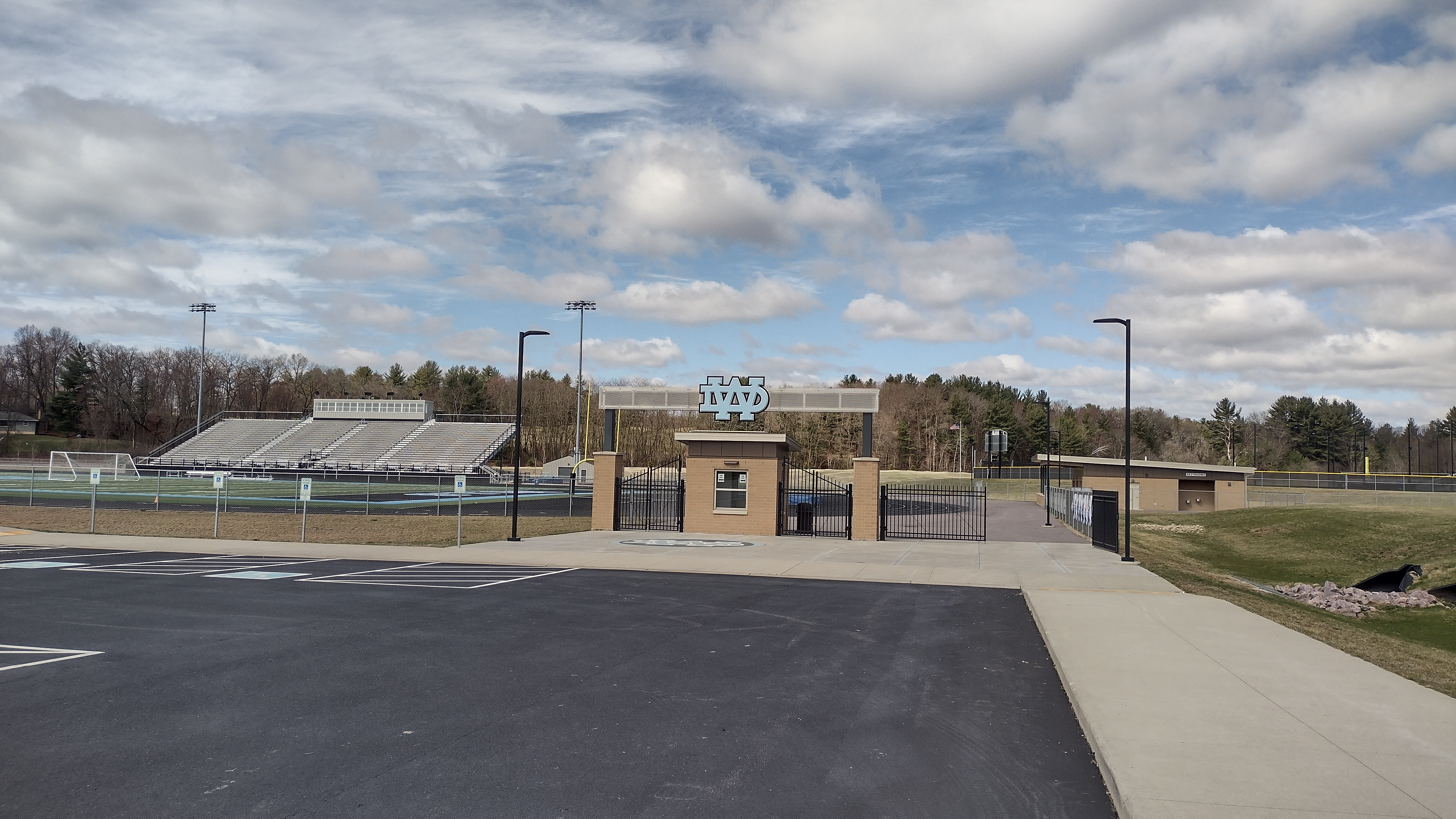
Entrance to the athletic field

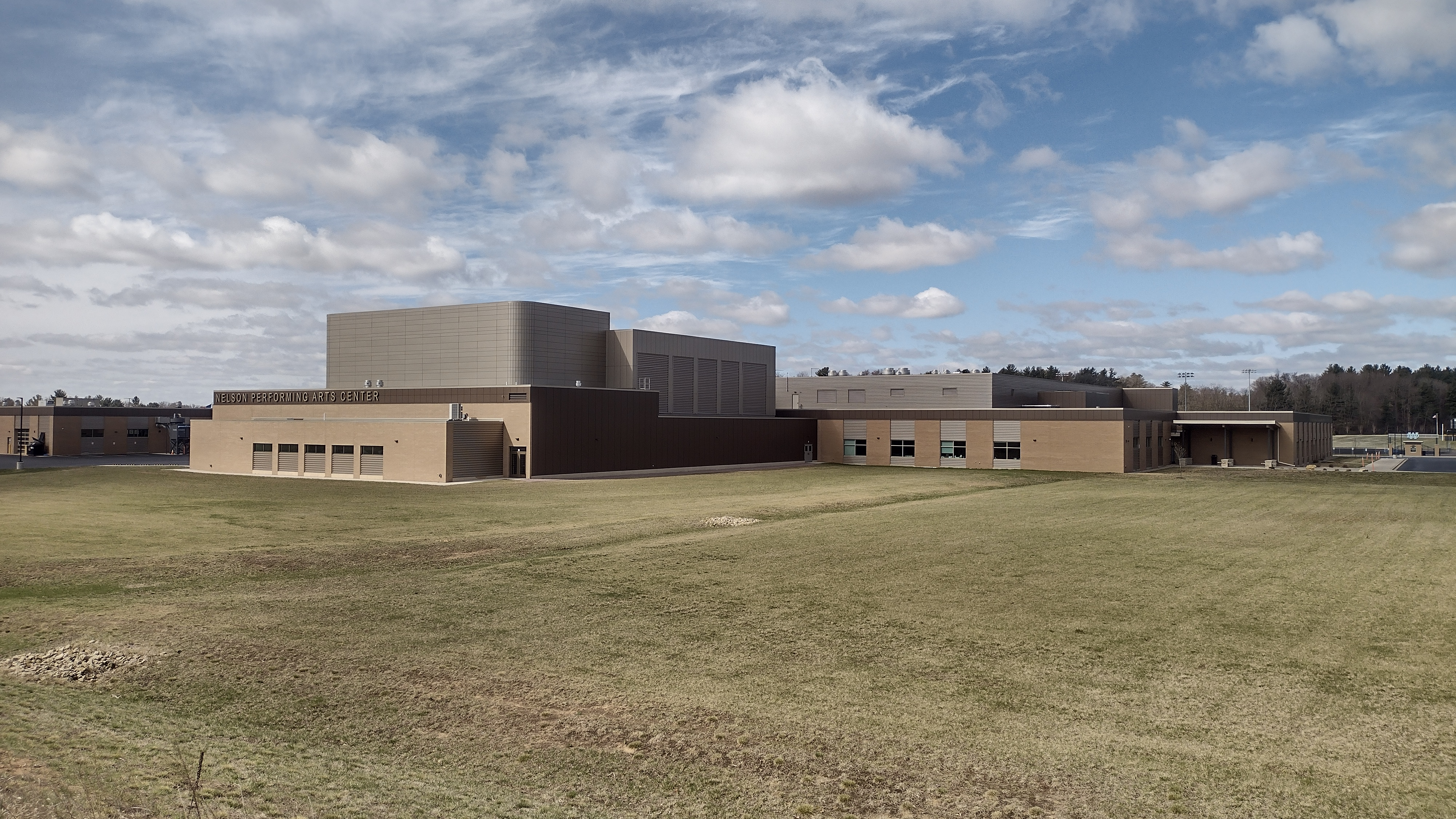
Nelson Performing Arts Center

== Notable alumni ==
- Jack B. Olson, businessman, diplomat, and politician
