= Dwight S. Welch =

American politician

Dwight S. Welch (January 13, 1874 – January 17, 1962) was a farmer and politician.

Welch was born in the town of Delton, Sauk County, Wisconsin. He went to the local schools. Welch was a farmer and was involved with the telephone business. Welch served on the school board and was involved with the Republican Party. He served in the Wisconsin Assembly in 1923 and 1924. Welch died in East Tawas, Michigan.
