= Jackson, Adams County, Wisconsin =

Jackson, Wisconsin
- Town
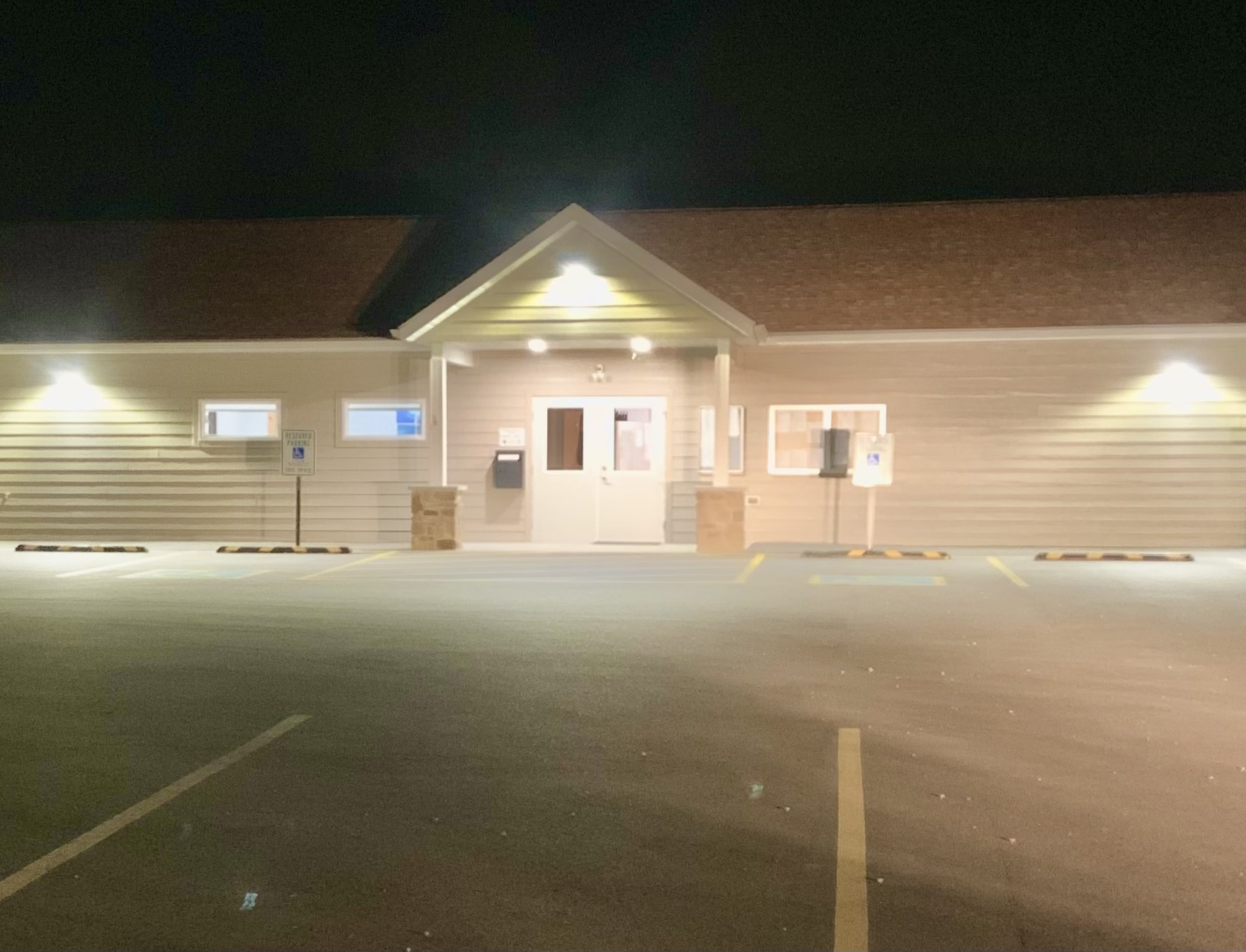
- Town hall

- Location in Adams County and the state of Wisconsin.

- Location within Wisconsin Location within the United States
- Coordinates: 43°46′29″N 89°38′34″W
- Country: United States
- State: Wisconsin
- County: Adams

Area
  - Total: 35.7 sq mi (92.5 km^{2})
  - Land: 34.7 sq mi (89.9 km^{2})
  - Water: 1.0 sq mi (2.6 km^{2})
- Elevation: 971 ft (296 m)

Population (2020)
  - Total: 1,141
  - Density: 32.9/sq mi (12.7/km^{2})
- Time zone: UTC-6 (Central (CST))
  - Summer (DST): UTC-5 (CDT)
- Area code: 608
- FIPS code: 55-37625
- GNIS feature ID: 1583441
- Website: townofjacksonadamswi.gov

There are some other places named Jackson in Wisconsin.

Jackson is a town in Adams County in the U.S. state of Wisconsin. The population was 1,141 at the 2020 census, up from 1,003 at the 2010 census.

== Geography ==
Jackson is located at 43°45′55″N 89°39′29″W (43.765460, −89.658140).

According to the United States Census Bureau, the town has a total area of 35.7 square miles (92.5 km^{2}), of which 34.7 square miles (89.9 km^{2}) is land and 1.0 square mile (2.6 km^{2}), or 2.84%, is water, consisting of several lakes, the largest of which is Jordan Lake in the southern part of town.

== Demographics ==
Historical population
Census	Pop.	Note	%±
1870	481		—
1880	482		0.2%
1890	504		4.6%
1900	589		16.9%
1910	615		4.4%
1920	584		−5.0%
1930	491		−15.9%
1940	505		2.9%
1950	466		−7.7%
1960	449		−3.6%
1970	497		10.7%
1980	640		28.8%
1990	641		0.2%
2000	926		44.5%
2010	1,003		8.3%
2020	1,141		13.8%
U.S. Decennial Census

As of the census of 2000, there were 926 people, 397 households, and 285 families residing in the town. The population density was 26.6 people per square mile (10.3 people/km^{2}). There were 951 housing units at an average density of 27.3 units per square mile (10.5 units/km^{2}). The racial makeup of the town was 97.19% White, 0.43% African American, 0.97% Native American, 0.65% Asian, and 0.76% from two or more races. Hispanic or Latino of any race were 2.27% of the population.

There were 397 households, out of which 24.4% had children under the age of 18 living with them, 61.5% were married couples living together, 7.1% had a female householder with no husband present, and 28.0% were non-families. 22.9% of all households were made up of individuals, and 8.3% had someone living alone who was 65 years of age or older. The average household size was 2.33 and the average family size was 2.73.

In the town, the population was spread out, with 19.9% under the age of 18, 5.6% from 18 to 24, 21.9% from 25 to 44, 30.3% from 45 to 64, and 22.2% who were 65 years of age or older. The median age was 47 years. For every 100 females, there were 104.9 males. For every 100 females age 18 and over, there were 106.7 males.

The median income for a household in the town was $39,338, and the median income for a family was $44,635. Males had a median income of $29,886 versus $23,542 for females. The per capita income for the town was $19,080. About 1.3% of families and 5.7% of the population were below the poverty line, including 6.6% of those under age 18 and 4.9% of those age 65 or over.

== Education ==
Three school districts include parts of Jackson Town: School District of Wisconsin Dells, Westfield School District, and Adams-Friendship Area School District.

The Wisconsin Dells district which operates Spring Hill Middle School and Wisconsin Dells High School.
