= Dell Prairie, Wisconsin =

- Town
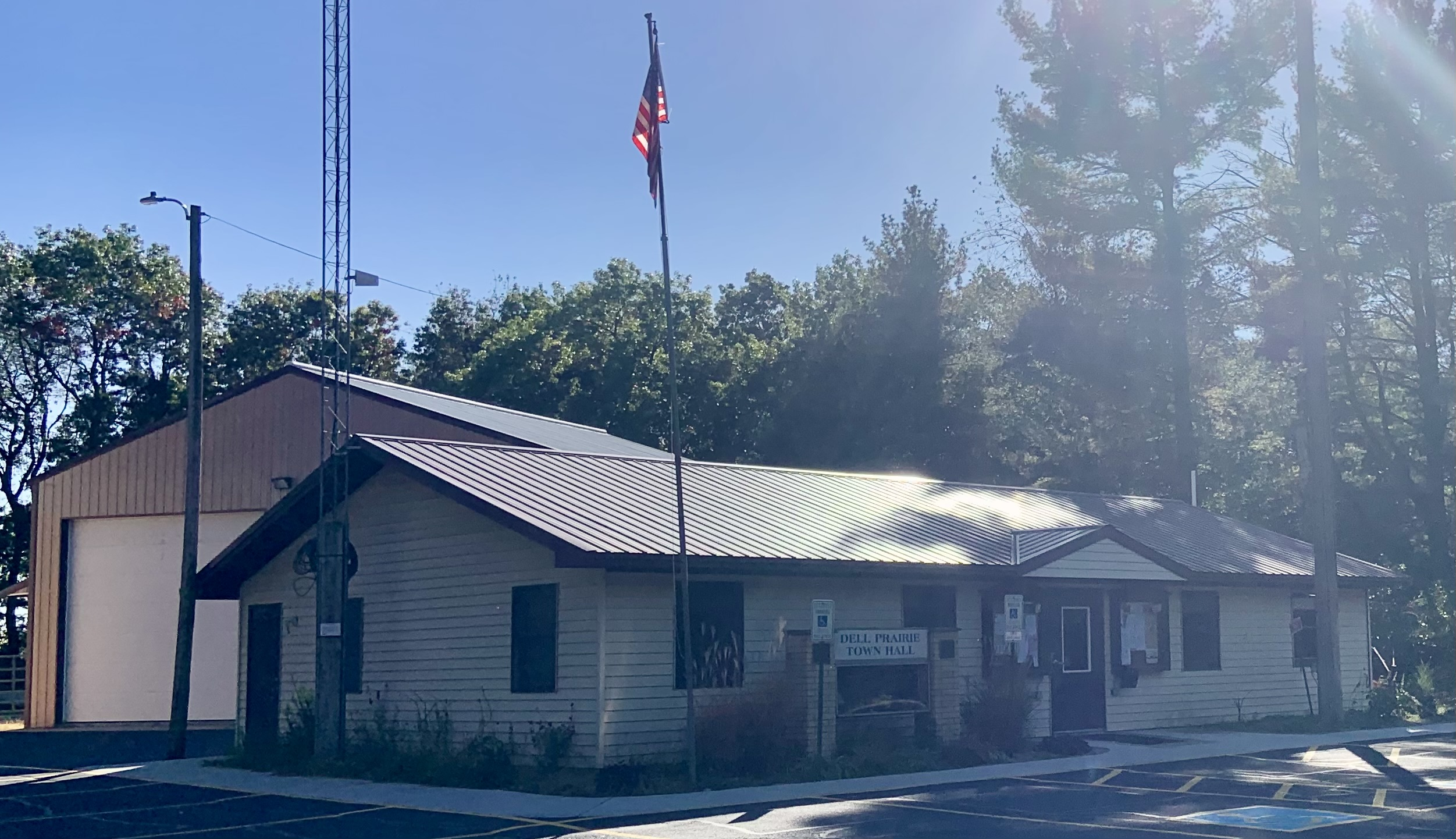
- Town hall

- Location in Adams County and the state of Wisconsin.

- Location within Wisconsin Location within the United States
- Coordinates: 43°41′7″N 89°46′14″W
- Country: United States
- State: Wisconsin
- County: Adams

Area
  - Total: 33.1 sq mi (85.8 km^{2})
  - Land: 31.9 sq mi (82.7 km^{2})
  - Water: 1.2 sq mi (3.2 km^{2})
- Elevation: 988 ft (301 m)

Population (2020)
  - Total: 1,631
  - Density: 51.1/sq mi (19.7/km^{2})
- Time zone: UTC-6 (Central (CST))
  - Summer (DST): UTC-5 (CDT)
- Area code: 608
- FIPS code: 55-19575
- GNIS feature ID: 1583071
- Website: townofdellprairiewi.com

Dell Prairie is a town in Adams County in the U.S. state of Wisconsin. The population was 1,631 at the 2020 census, up from 1,590 at the 2010 census. The unincorporated community of Plainville is located in the town.

== Geography ==
Dell Prairie is located at 43°21′22″N 89°44′52″W (43.689600, −89.748050).

According to the United States Census Bureau, the town has a total area of 33.1 square miles (85.8 km^{2}), of which 31.9 square miles (82.7 km^{2}) is land and 1.2 square miles (3.2 km^{2}), or 3.69%, is water. The western boundary of the town is formed by the Wisconsin River, which flows through the Upper Wisconsin Dells along the southern part of the town boundary. The city of Wisconsin Dells extends north from Columbia County into land along the Wisconsin River that was formerly in Dell Prairie.

== Demographics ==
Historical population
Census	Pop.	Note	%±
1870	534		—
1880	500		−6.4%
1890	418		−16.4%
1900	581		39.0%
1910	554		−4.6%
1920	396		−28.5%
1930	381		−3.8%
1940	410		7.6%
1950	396		−3.4%
1960	411		3.8%
1970	435		5.8%
1980	856		96.8%
1990	1,063		24.2%
2000	1,415		33.1%
2010	1,590		12.4%
2020	1,613		1.4%
U.S. Decennial Census

As of the census of 2000, there were 1,415 people, 553 households, and 403 families residing in the town. The population density was 42.4 people per square mile (16.4 people/km^{2}). There were 754 housing units at an average density of 22.6 units per square mile (8.7 units/km^{2}). The racial makeup of the town was 96.89% White, 0.64% African American, 1.48% Native American, 0.49% Asian, and 0.49% from two or more races. Hispanic or Latino of any race were 1.34% of the population.

There were 553 households, out of which 29.7% had children under the age of 18 living with them, 62.7% were married couples living together, 6.0% had a female householder with no husband present, and 27.1% were non-families. 21.3% of all households were made up of individuals, and 8.0% had someone living alone who was 65 years of age or older. The average household size was 2.51 and the average family size was 2.89.

In the town, the population was spread out, with 22.7% under the age of 18, 6.1% from 18 to 24, 27.1% from 25 to 44, 30.1% from 45 to 64, and 14.0% who were 65 years of age or older. The median age was 41 years. For every 100 females, there were 107.8 males. For every 100 females age 18 and over, there were 103.0 males.

The median income for a household in the town was $43,750, and the median income for a family was $47,750. Males had a median income of $32,356 versus $22,563 for females. The per capita income for the town was $19,209. About 5.2% of families and 7.8% of the population were below the poverty line, including 10.2% of those under age 18 and 8.7% of those age 65 or over.

== Education ==
Dell Prairie lies within the service area of the School District of Wisconsin Dells, which operates Spring Hill Middle School and Wisconsin Dells High School.
