= Jackson, Wisconsin =

Jackson, Wisconsin may refer to:

- Jackson County, Wisconsin
- Jackson, Adams County, Wisconsin, a town
- Jackson, Burnett County, Wisconsin, a town
- Jackson, Washington County, Wisconsin, a town
- Jackson (village), Wisconsin, in Washington County

== See also ==
- Jackson (disambiguation)
