= Big Spring, Wisconsin =

- Unincorporated community
- Location within Wisconsin Location within the United States
- Coordinates: 43°40′10″N 89°38′37″W
- Country: United States
- State: Wisconsin
- County: Adams
- Town: New Haven
- Elevation: 823 ft (251 m)
- Time zone: UTC-6 (Central (CST))
  - Summer (DST): UTC-5 (CDT)
- Area code: 608
- GNIS feature ID: 1561772

Big Spring is an unincorporated community located in the town of New Haven, Adams County, Wisconsin, United States. Big Spring is 7 miles (11 km) east-northeast of Wisconsin Dells.

== Notable people ==
- Alonzo L. Best, Wisconsin State Representative, farmer, and teacher, was born in Big Spring.
- Sophronius S. Landt, Wisconsin State Representative, lived in Big Spring.
- Una R. Winter, suffragist, was born in Big Spring.
