= Dellona, Wisconsin =

- Town
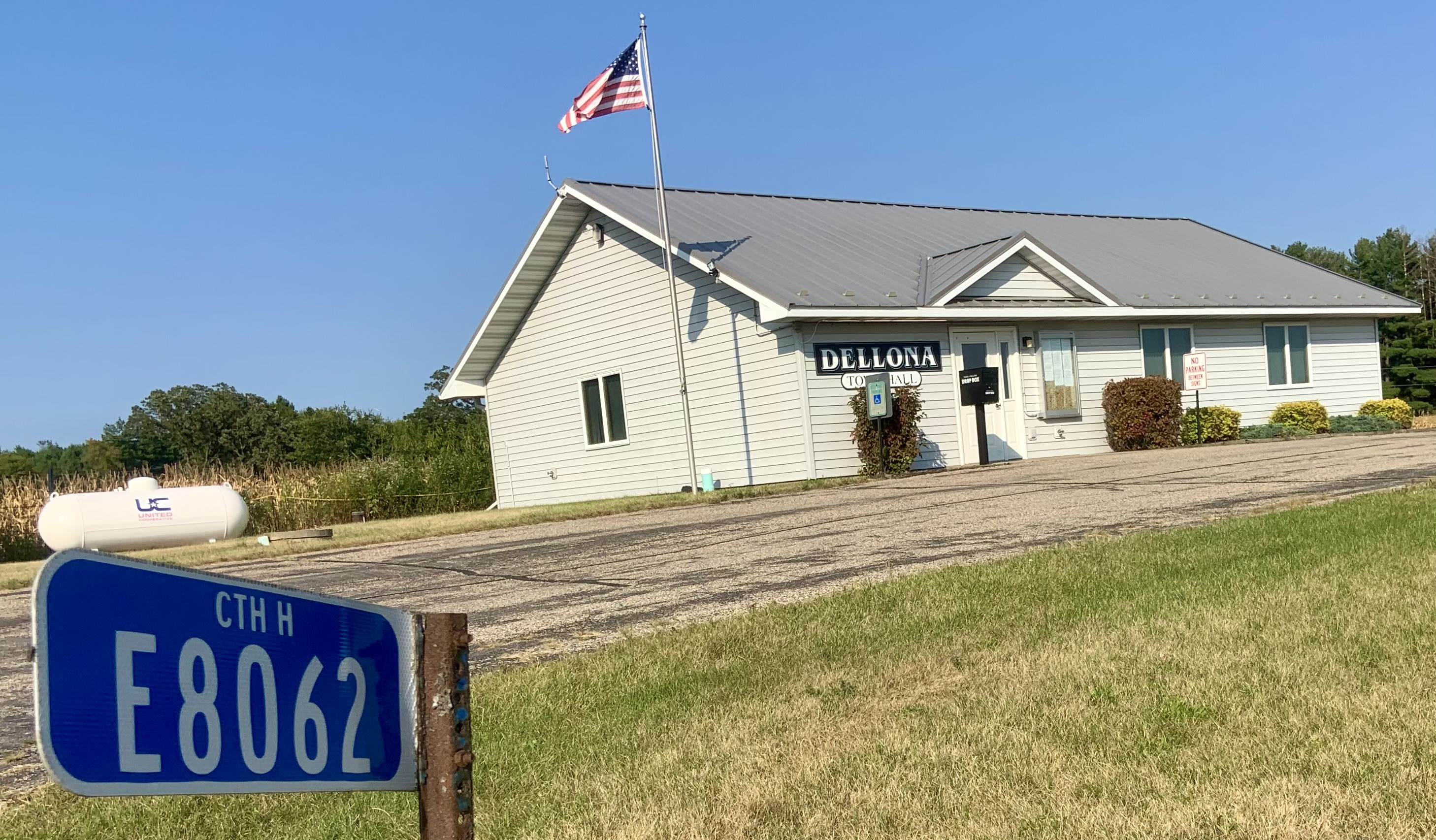
- Town hall

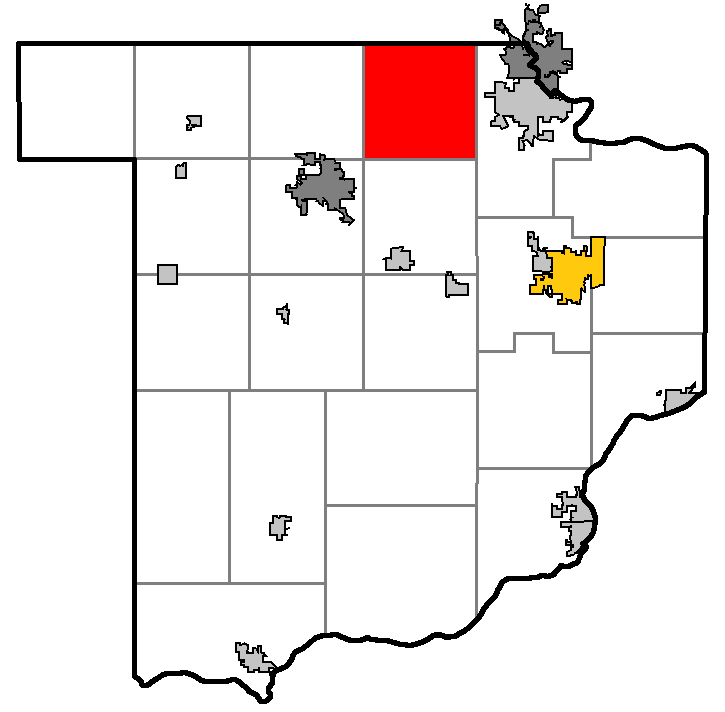
- Location of Dellona, within Sauk County, Wisconsin

- Location of Sauk County, Wisconsin
- Coordinates: 43°35′27″N 89°53′30″W
- Country: United States
- State: Wisconsin
- County: Sauk

Area
  - Total: 35.1 sq mi (91.0 km^{2})
  - Land: 35.1 sq mi (90.9 km^{2})
  - Water: 0.039 sq mi (0.1 km^{2})
- Elevation: 899 ft (274 m)

Population (2020)
  - Total: 1,901
  - Density: 54.2/sq mi (20.9/km^{2})
- Time zone: UTC-6 (Central (CST))
  - Summer (DST): UTC-5 (CDT)
- Area code: 608
- FIPS code: 55-19550
- GNIS feature ID: 1583070
- Website: https://dellonawi.gov/

Dellona is a town in Sauk County, Wisconsin, United States. The population was 1,901 at the 2020 census. The unincorporated community of Dellwood is located in the town.

== Geography ==
According to the United States Census Bureau, the town has a total area of 35.2 square miles (91.0 km^{2}), of which 35.1 square miles (90.9 km^{2}) is land and 0.04 square miles (0.1 km^{2}) (0.11%) is water.

== Demographics ==
At the 2000 census, there were 1,199 people, 422 households and 335 families residing in the town. The population density was 34.2 per square mile (13.2/km^{2}). There were 498 housing units at an average density of 14.2 per square mile (5.5/km^{2}). The racial makeup of the town was 92.33% White, 0.08% African American, 6.51% Native American, 0.42% Asian, 0.17% from other races, and 0.50% from two or more races. Hispanic or Latino of any race were 0.92% of the population.

There were 422 households, of which 35.1% had children under the age of 18 living with them, 68.7% were married couples living together, 6.2% had a female householder with no husband present, and 20.6% were non-families. 13.5% of all households were made up of individuals, and 4.0% had someone living alone who was 65 years of age or older. The average household size was 2.84 and the average family size was 3.10.

27.5% of the population were under the age of 18, 6.6% from 18 to 24, 29.6% from 25 to 44, 27.1% from 45 to 64, and 9.2% who were 65 years of age or older. The median age was 38 years. For every 100 females, there were 105.0 males. For every 100 females age 18 and over, there were 104.5 males.

The median household income was $46,630 and the median family income was $50,375. Males had a median income of $32,500 and females $24,750. The per capita income was $18,998. About 6.3% of families and 11.1% of the population were below the poverty line, including 13.4% of those under age 18 and 8.9% of those age 65 or over.

== Education ==
Dellona is in the service area of the School District of Wisconsin Dells, which operates Spring Hill Middle School and Wisconsin Dells High School.
