= School District of Wisconsin Dells =

School district in Wisconsin, US

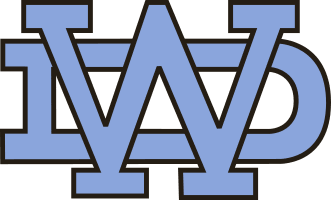

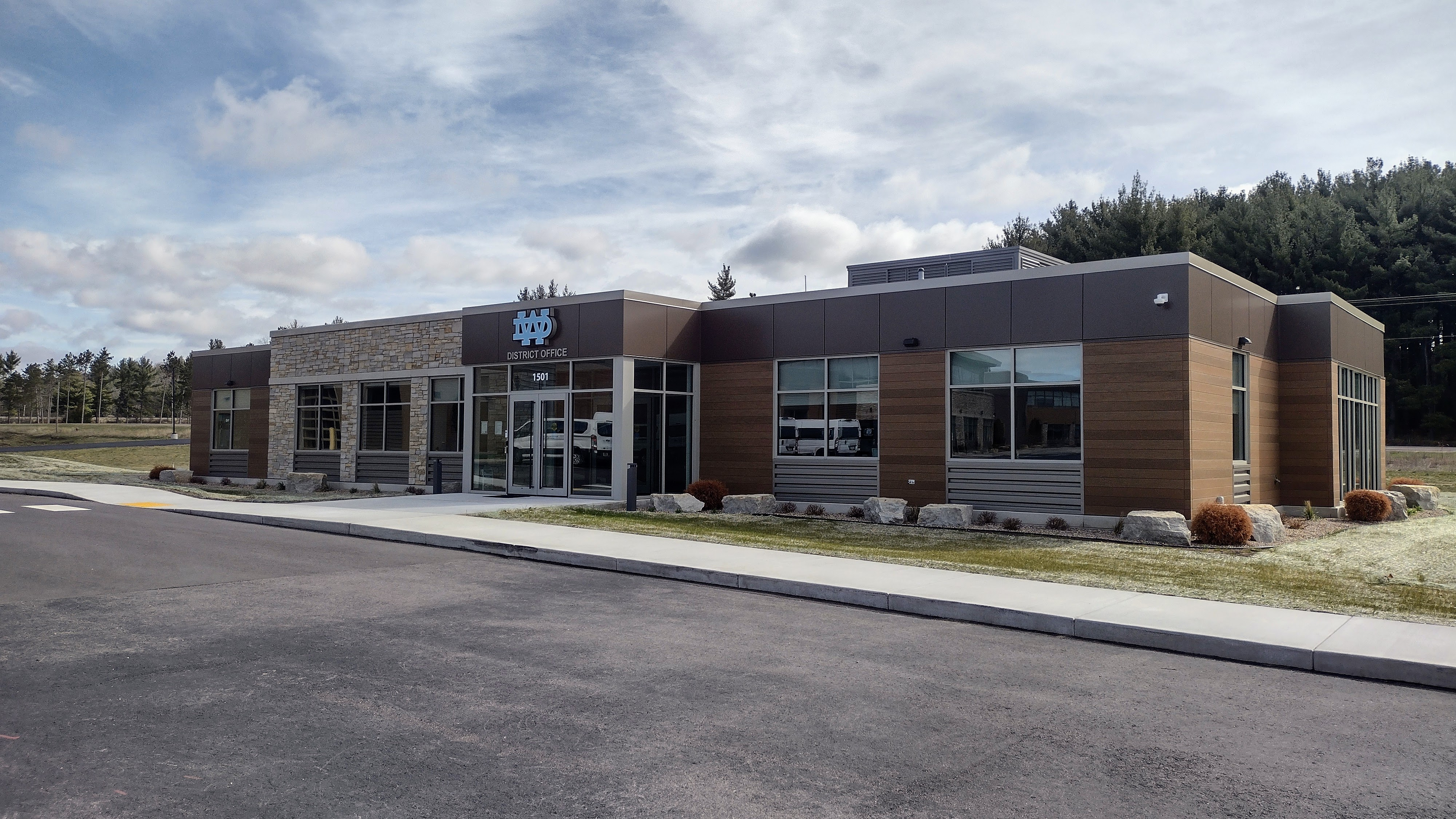
- District offices for the school district

Address
- 1501 Brew Farm Road Wisconsin Dells, Sauk County, Wisconsin, 53965; United States

District information
- Type: Public
- Grades: Pre-K/K–12
- Superintendent: Terry Slack
- School board: Seven members
- Chair of the board: Jennifer Gavinski
- Schools: Elementary two, Middle one, High one
- NCES District ID: 5517040

Students and staff
- Students: 1,842 (2023-2024)

Other information
- Website: www.sdwd.k12.wi.us

School District of Wisconsin Dells is a school district headquartered in Wisconsin Dells, Wisconsin. Its territory includes sections of the counties of Adams, Columbia, Juneau, Marquette, and Sauk.

The district's area is 186 square miles (480 km^{2}); due to the overall size, geographical features and school placement, school bus transport serves the majority of the student body.

Municipalities served by the district include Wisconsin Dells, Dell Prairie, Dellona, Delton, Jackson, Lake Delton, Lyndon, New Haven, Newport, and Springville.

== Schools ==
| School | Year built | Description |
|---|---|---|
| Wisconsin Dells High School | 2020 | A new high school was built in 2020. |
| Wisconsin Dells Middle School | 1960s | |
| Wisconsin Dells Elementary School | 1991 | |

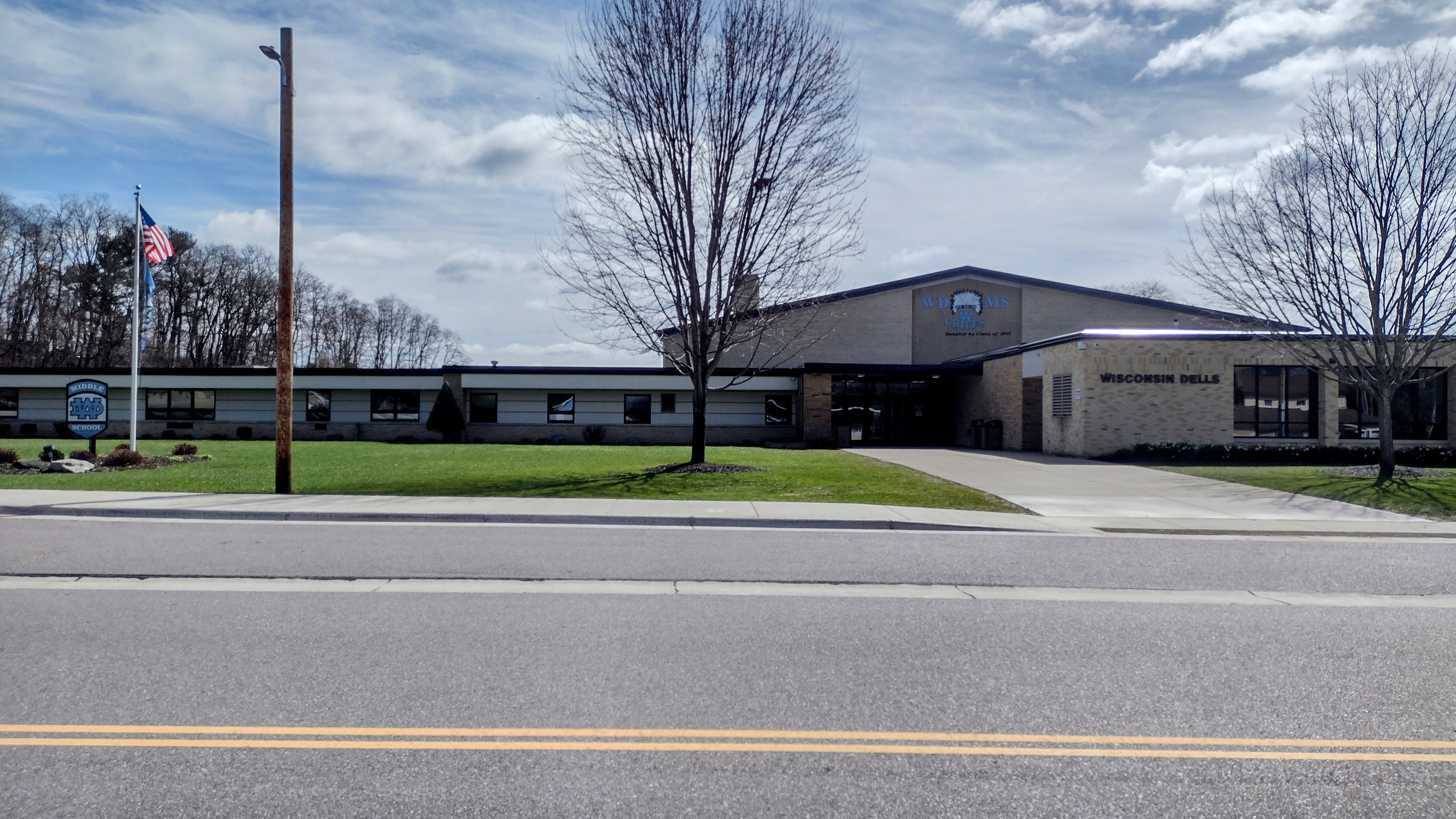
Middle School

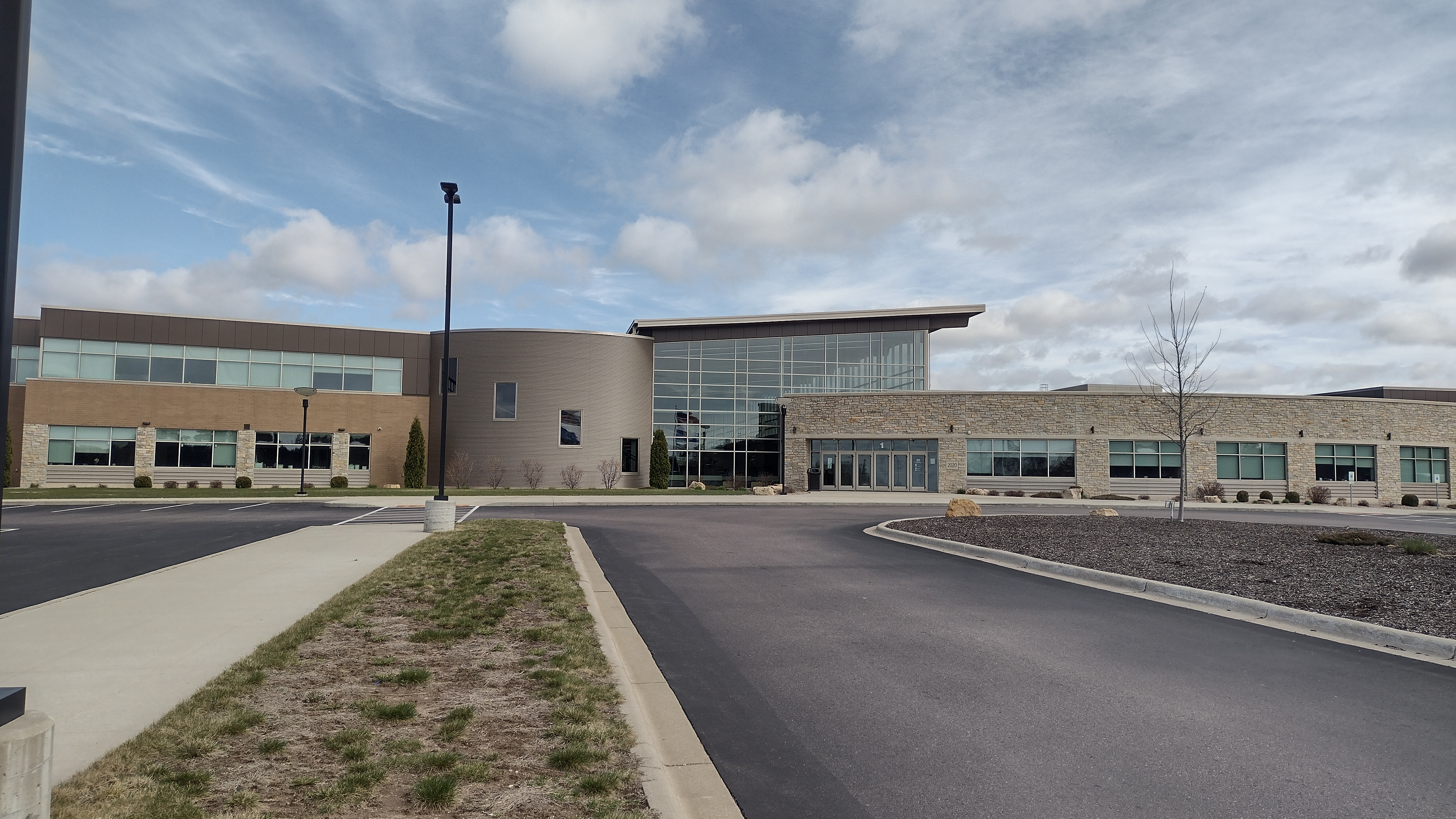
High School

== Former schools ==
- Neenah Creek Elementary School

== Leadership ==
The current superintendent is Terry Slack, who accepted the position on July 1, 2011.

=== Board of education ===
The district is run by a seven-member school board. Members are elected in April for staggered three-year terms.

| Position | Name | Assumed office | Term ends | Electoral history | Refs |
|---|---|---|---|---|---|
| President | Jennifer Gavinski | | 2027 | | |
| Vice President | Erik Backhaus | | 2026 | | |
| Treasurer | Del Morter | | 2027 | | |
| Board Clerk | Jesse Weaver | 2016 | 2025 | | |
| Board Member | Kathy Anderson | | 2026 | | |
| Board Member | James McClyman | | 2025 | | |
| Board Member | Blake Kochendorfer | | 2026 | | |
