= Una R. Winter =

American club woman and women's suffrage leader

Una Richardson Winter
- Born: Una Richardson; December 29, 1872; Big Spring, Wisconsin
- Died: January 20, 1956 (aged 83); Cucamonga, California
- Known for: Southern Californian club woman, women's suffrage leader

Una Richardson Winter (December 29, 1872 – January 20, 1956) was a Southern Californian club woman, women's suffrage leader, and director of the Susan B. Anthony Memorial Committee of California.

== Early life and family ==
Una Richardson was born in Big Spring, Wisconsin, on December 29, 1872, the daughter of Newell Richardson and Grace Holmes (died April 11, 1928). She had two brothers, Earl Holmes Richardson and J. Roy Richardson. Earl Holmes Richardson was the inventor of the Hotpoint electric iron, head of the General Electric Co. plant in Ontario and founder of the desert community of Adelanto, California, with his brother J. Roy Richardson. Una was the aunt of John Anson Ford, American journalist, advertising executive, Democratic Party politician and long-serving member of the Los Angeles County Board of Supervisors.

== Career ==
Winter was joint owner and accountant of citrus properties. She prided herself on having been the first woman in Wisconsin to operate a typewriter when serving as secretary to a lumber concern at Tomah, Wisconsin.

She was president of the Southern District, California Federation of Business and Professional Women's Clubs. In 1928 she was the first such executive to fly to a convention, having made the trip by plane from Los Angeles to San Diego. From 1912 to 1914 she was president of the Chicago Altrui Women's Club. She was president and honorary life member of both the Upland Woman's Club and Upland Business and Professional Women's Club. She was a member of the Claremont Pomological Club-Citrus Growers Club. In August 1928 she endorsed the candidacy of former Judge Jesse Olney, from the Upland Business and Professional Women's club; her effort were not met by the Women's Club. On September 28, 1928, one hundred prominent business and professional women of the West End and from Pomona assembled at Hotel Ontario for a Herbert Hoover dinner and rally. Winter was general chairman and acted as presiding officer.

In 1935 she visited Mexico as representative of the Business Women's legislative council in the interests of the equal suffrage campaign. She reported being received with courtesy but was unable to discover any interest in women's suffrage there; she also reported the lack of women's organizations in the country.

On September 24, 1935, she founded the Equal Rights Study Club, made up of a group of members of the Ontario and Upland Business and Professional Women's clubs. The focus was a special study of proposed equal rights amendments to the Constitution of the United States. Winter was named temporary chairman and the club held its first regular meeting at her home in East Ninth Street, Cucamonga.

She was the director of the Susan B. Anthony Memorial Committee of California and collected material about Susan B. Anthony and her family. Her papers are at the Huntington Library, Manuscripts Department, and include material about Mary Ritter Beard, Carrie Chapman Catt, and Alma Lutz, in addition to material about Susan B. Anthony. There are also some letters (1936–46) from various Congressmen to Una Richardson Winter regarding the Equal Rights Amendment. The bulk of the Susan B. Anthony Papers at the Sophia Smith Collection, Smith College, came by Una R. Winter. The Amy C. Ransome Collection was donated to University of Southern California by Winter; Amy Cordoba Rock Ransome (1872–1942), suffragist, was a National Woman's Party leader who devoted her life to promote equal rights for women.

In 1948 Winter wrote Alice Park of California: Worker for Woman Suffrage and for Children's Rights. Alice Locke Park was a notable California suffragist and associate director of the Susan B. Anthony Memorial Committee of California.

== Personal life ==
Winter moved to California in 1914 and lived at 8303 Ninth Street, Cucamonga, California. She married George L. Winter (1884–1951). She died on January 20, 1956, and is buried beside her husband at Bellevue Memorial Park, Ontario, California.
