= Lyndon, Juneau County, Wisconsin =

Lyndon, Wisconsin
- Town
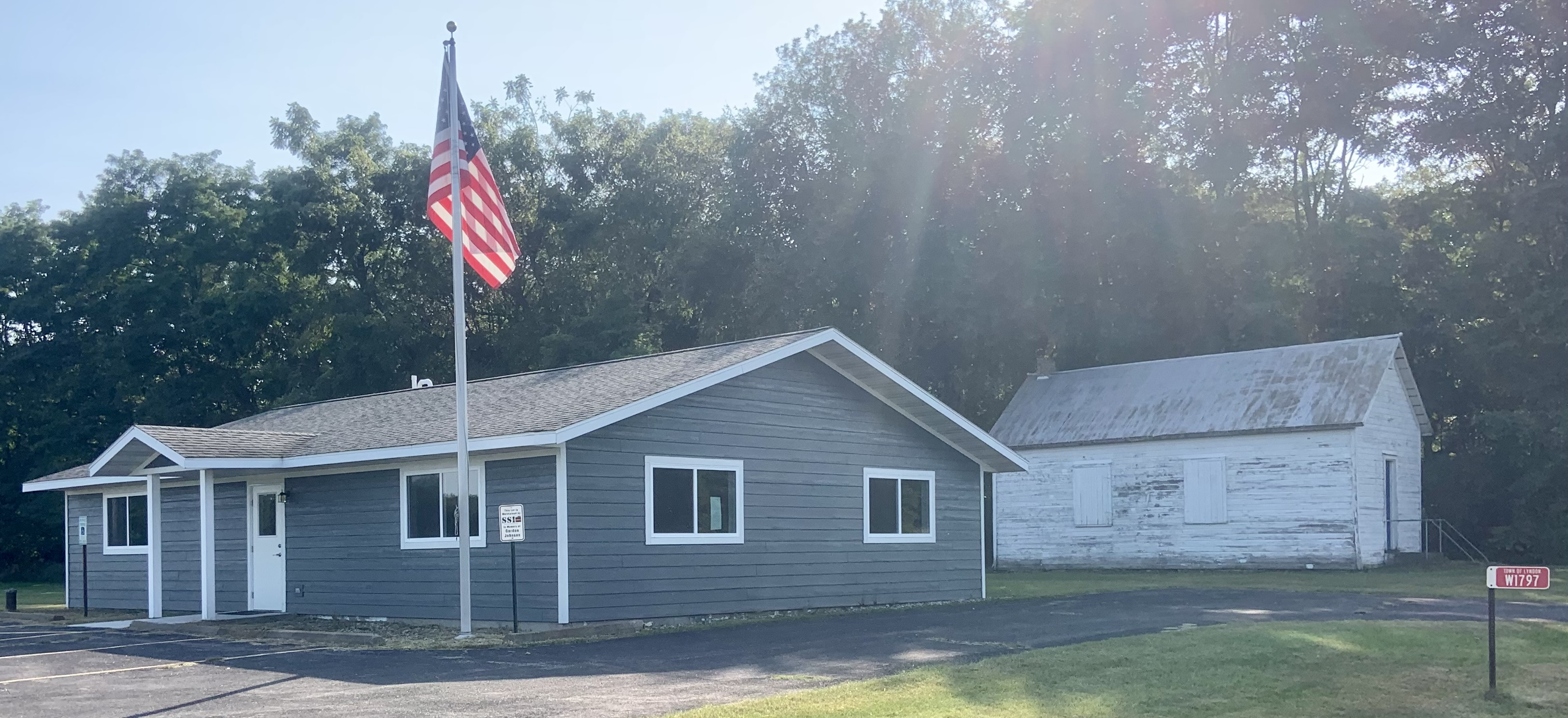
- Town hall

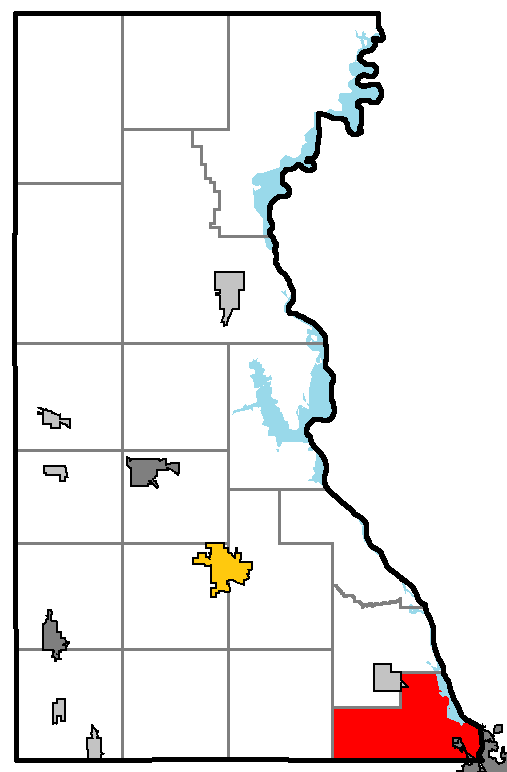
- Location of Lyndon, Juneau County

- Location of Juneau County, Wisconsin
- Coordinates: 43°40′28″N 89°51′27″W
- Country: United States
- State: Wisconsin
- County: Juneau

Area
  - Total: 29.7 sq mi (76.8 km^{2})
  - Land: 28.3 sq mi (73.4 km^{2})
  - Water: 1.3 sq mi (3.4 km^{2})
- Elevation: 968 ft (295 m)

Population (2020)
  - Total: 1,493
  - Density: 52.7/sq mi (20.3/km^{2})
- Time zone: UTC-6 (Central (CST))
  - Summer (DST): UTC-5 (CDT)
- Area code: 608
- FIPS code: 55-46525
- GNIS feature ID: 1583612
- Website: https://townoflyndonwi.gov/

Lyndon is a town in Juneau County, Wisconsin, United States. The population was 1,493 at the 2020 census. The unincorporated community of Indian Heights is located in the town.

== Geography ==
According to the United States Census Bureau, the town has a total area of 29.6 square miles (76.8 km^{2}), of which 28.3 square miles (73.4 km^{2}) is land and 1.3 square miles (3.4 km^{2}) (4.39%) is water.

== Demographics ==
As of the census of 2000, there were 1,217 people, 440 households, and 332 families residing in the town. The population density was 42.9 people per square mile (16.6/km^{2}). There were 534 housing units at an average density of 18.8 per square mile (7.3/km^{2}). The racial makeup of the town was 80.69% White, 0.90% African American, 15.20% Native American, 0.08% Asian, 1.81% from other races, and 1.31% from two or more races. Hispanic or Latino of any race were 2.63% of the population.

There were 440 households, out of which 37.0% had children under the age of 18 living with them, 59.3% were married couples living together, 10.7% had a female householder with no husband present, and 24.5% were non-families. 18.6% of all households were made up of individuals, and 5.2% had someone living alone who was 65 years of age or older. The average household size was 2.77 and the average family size was 3.11.

In the town, the population was spread out, with 29.3% under the age of 18, 7.8% from 18 to 24, 28.4% from 25 to 44, 25.7% from 45 to 64, and 8.7% who were 65 years of age or older. The median age was 35 years. For every 100 females, there were 105.6 males. For every 100 females age 18 and over, there were 104.8 males.

The median income for a household in the town was $42,639, and the median income for a family was $49,583. Males had a median income of $31,250 versus $20,446 for females. The per capita income for the town was $17,014. About 2.6% of families and 5.1% of the population were below the poverty line, including 5.8% of those under age 18 and 3.9% of those age 65 or over.

== Education ==
It is in the service area of the School District of Wisconsin Dells, which operates Spring Hill Middle School and Wisconsin Dells High School.
