= Dellwood, Sauk County, Wisconsin =

Dellwood, Wisconsin
- Unincorporated community
- Location within Wisconsin Location within the United States
- Coordinates: 43°33′48″N 89°50′26″W
- Country: United States
- State: Wisconsin
- County: Sauk
- Elevation: 869 ft (265 m)
- Time zone: UTC-6 (Central (CST))
  - Summer (DST): UTC-5 (CDT)
- Area code: 608
- GNIS feature ID: 1563890

Dellwood is an unincorporated community in Sauk County, Wisconsin, United States. Dellwood is located on Wisconsin Highway 23 southwest of Lake Delton, in the town of Dellona.
