= Indian Heights, Juneau County, Wisconsin =

Indian Heights, Wisconsin
- Unincorporated community
- Location within Wisconsin Location within the United States
- Coordinates: 43°41′11″N 89°49′52″W
- Country: United States
- State: Wisconsin
- County: Juneau
- Town: Lyndon
- Elevation: 850 ft (260 m)
- Time zone: UTC-6 (Central (CST))
  - Summer (DST): UTC-5 (CDT)
- Area code: 608
- GNIS feature ID: 2741526

Indian Heights is an unincorporated community located in the town of Lyndon, Juneau County, Wisconsin, United States. Indian Heights is located on County Highway N near Interstate 90, Interstate 94, and U.S. Route 12, 4 miles (6.4 km) southeast of Lyndon Station. The community is part of the Ho-Chunk Nation.
