= New Haven, Adams County, Wisconsin =

New Haven, Wisconsin
- Town
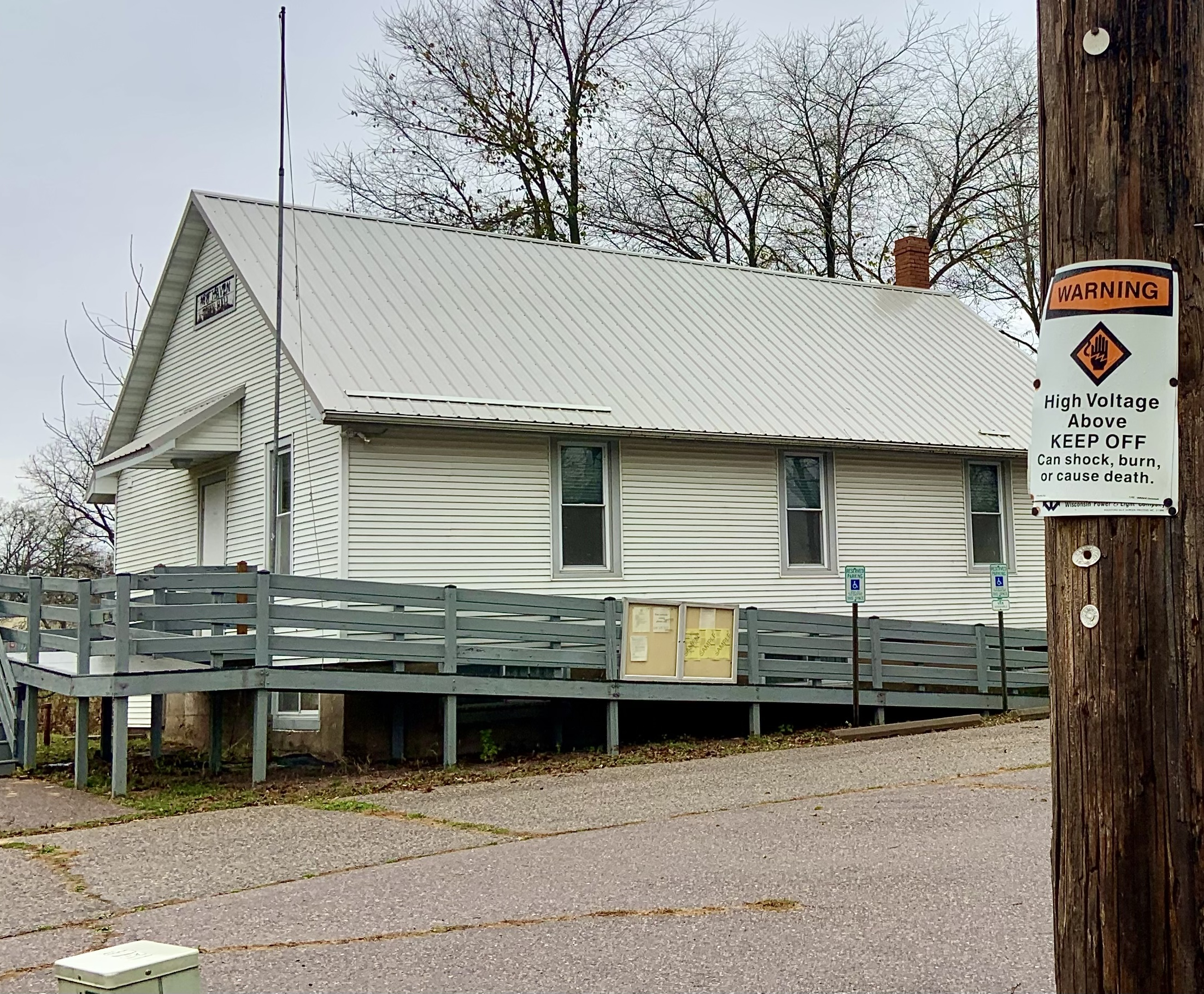
- Town hall

- Location in Adams County and the state of Wisconsin.
- Coordinates: 43°41′10″N 89°38′24″W
- Country: United States
- State: Wisconsin
- County: Adams

Area
  - Total: 30.4 sq mi (78.7 km^{2})
  - Land: 29.2 sq mi (75.5 km^{2})
  - Water: 1.2 sq mi (3.2 km^{2})
- Elevation: 856 ft (261 m)

Population (2020)
  - Total: 680
  - Density: 23/sq mi (9.0/km^{2})
- Time zone: UTC-6 (Central (CST))
  - Summer (DST): UTC-5 (CDT)
- Area code: 608
- FIPS code: 55-56750
- GNIS feature ID: 1583807
- Website: www.newhavenwi.us

New Haven is a town in Adams County in the U.S. state of Wisconsin. The population was 680 at the 2020 census, up from 655 at the 2010 census. The unincorporated community of Big Spring is located in the town.

== Geography ==
New Haven is located at 43°40′43″N 89°38′57″W (43.678790, −89.64926).

According to the United States Census Bureau, the town has a total area of 30.4 square miles (78.7 km^{2}), of which 29.2 square miles (75.5 km^{2}) is land and 1.2 square miles (3.2 km^{2}), or 4.12%, is water.

== Demographics ==
Historical population
| Census | Pop. | Note | %± |
|---|---|---|---|
| 1870 | 894 | | — |
| 1880 | 836 | | −6.5% |
| 1890 | 746 | | −10.8% |
| 1900 | 693 | | −7.1% |
| 1910 | 641 | | −7.5% |
| 1920 | 580 | | −9.5% |
| 1930 | 549 | | −5.3% |
| 1940 | 585 | | 6.6% |
| 1950 | 599 | | 2.4% |
| 1960 | 515 | | −14.0% |
| 1970 | 543 | | 5.4% |
| 1980 | 522 | | −3.9% |
| 1990 | 511 | | −2.1% |
| 2000 | 657 | | 28.6% |
| 2010 | 655 | | −0.3% |
| 2020 | 680 | | 3.8% |
U.S. Decennial Census

As of the census of 2000, there were 657 people, 260 households, and 197 families residing in the town. The population density was 22.4 people per square mile (8.6 people/km^{2}). There were 338 housing units at an average density of 11.5 units per square mile (4.4 units/km^{2}). The racial makeup of the town was 97.26% White, 0.15% African American, 0.91% Native American, 0.30% Asian, 0.30% from other races, and 1.07% from two or more races. Hispanic or Latino of any race were 1.22% of the population.

There were 260 households, out of which 25.8% had children under the age of 18 living with them, 66.5% were married couples living together, 5.4% had a female householder with no husband present, and 24.2% were non-families. 19.6% of all households were made up of individuals, and 10.8% had someone living alone who was 65 years of age or older. The average household size was 2.53 and the average family size was 2.87.

In the town, the population was spread out, with 21.0% under the age of 18, 5.3% from 18 to 24, 29.1% from 25 to 44, 24.5% from 45 to 64, and 20.1% who were 65 years of age or older. The median age was 42 years. For every 100 females, there were 96.1 males. For every 100 females age 18 and over, there were 101.2 males.

The median income for a household in the town was $35,536, and the median income for a family was $38,173. Males had a median income of $30,096 versus $22,083 for females. The per capita income for the town was $15,624. About 7.5% of families and 11.3% of the population were below the poverty line, including 16.0% of those under age 18 and 13.3% of those age 65 or over.

== Education ==
Most of it is in the service area of the School District of Wisconsin Dells, which operates Spring Hill Middle School and Wisconsin Dells High School.

Pieces are in the Westfield School District.
